= 2016 Team Challenge Cup =

- Date: April 22 – 24, 2016
- Season: 2015–16
- Location: Spokane, Washington, USA
- Host: U.S. Figure Skating
- Venue: Spokane Arena

The 2016 Team Challenge Cup was a figure skating event held April 22–24, 2016 at the Spokane Arena in Spokane, Washington. Skaters competed as part of Team Asia, Team Europe, or Team North America.

The 2016 competition was the first edition of the event. Spokane was named as the host in September 2015.

== Entries ==
Team	Men	Ladies	Pairs	Ice dancing
Asia	Denis Ten; Shoma Uno; Jin Boyang	Satoko Miyahara; Elizabet Tursynbayeva; Rika Hongo	Wang Xuehan / Wang Lei; Sumire Suto / Francis Boudreau-Audet	Rebeka Kim / Kirill Minov; Wang Shiyue / Liu Xinyu
Europe	Sergei Voronov; Michal Březina; Mikhail Kolyada	Evgenia Medvedeva; Roberta Rodeghiero; Elena Radionova	Ksenia Stolbova / Fedor Klimov; Nicole Della Monica / Matteo Guarise	Anna Cappellini / Luca Lanotte; Penny Coomes / Nicholas Buckland
North America	Jason Brown; Nam Nguyen; Adam Rippon	Gracie Gold; Gabrielle Daleman; Ashley Wagner	Alexa Scimeca / Chris Knierim; Meagan Duhamel / Eric Radford	Madison Chock / Evan Bates; Kaitlyn Weaver / Andrew Poje

=== Changes to initial assignments ===
Announced	Team	Discipline	Withdrew	Added	Reason/Other notes
April 8, 2016	Asia	Singles	None	Rika Hongo; Jin Boyang	Online fan vote
April 8, 2016	Europe	Singles	None	Maxim Kovtun; Elena Radionova	Online fan vote
April 8, 2016	North America	Singles	None	Adam Rippon; Ashley Wagner	Online fan vote
April 8, 2016	Europe	Ladies	Elizaveta Tuktamysheva	Evgenia Medvedeva	Ankle injury
April 8, 2016	Asia	Pairs	Sui Wenjing / Han Cong	Wang Xuehan / Wang Lei	
April 18, 2016	Europe	Men	Maxim Kovtun	Mikhail Kolyada	Ear infection
April 18, 2016	Europe	Ice dance	Gabriella Papadakis / Guillaume Cizeron	Penny Coomes / Nicholas Buckland	Papadakis suffered minor injury

== Results ==
=== Individual Results ===
==== Men ====
Rank	Name	Team	Total points	SP		FS	
1	Shoma Uno	Asia	298.66	1	105.74	1	192.92
2	Jason Brown	North America	269.22	4	87.72	2	181.50
3	Adam Rippon	North America	252.73	5	86.05	3	166.68
4	Boyang Jin	Asia	249.89	2	93.18	6	156.71
5	Denis Ten	Asia	240.40	3	92.63	7	147.77
6	Mikhail Kolyada	Europe	236.08	6	70.60	4	165.48
7	Michal Brezina	Europe	222.84	8	64.54	5	158.30
8	Sergei Voronov	Europe	195.34	9	62.55	8	132.79
9	Nam Nguyen	North America	192.01	7	64.91	9	127.10

==== Ladies ====
Rank	Name	Team	Total points	SP		FS	
1	Evgenia Medvedeva	Europe	229.11	1	77.56	1	151.55
2	Satoko Miyahara	Asia	218.30	3	73.28	2	145.02
3	Ashley Wagner	North America	217.74	2	74.54	3	143.20
4	Gracie Gold	North America	213.34	4	71.34	4	142.00
5	Elena Radionova	Europe	194.67	8	61.36	5	133.31
6	Elizabet Tursynbaeva	Asia	189.05	6	65.44	6	123.61
7	Gabrielle Daleman	North America	184.38	5	68.45	8	115.93
8	Rika Hongo	Asia	182.58	9	60.43	7	122.15
9	Roberta Rodeghiero	Europe	166.75	7	61.75	9	105.00

=== Head-to-head competition ===
On Friday, April 22, singles skaters competed in a head-to-head competition. There were six rounds, with one skater from each team competing. Each skater earned points for their team based on placement. The team with the most placement points won the head-to-head competition. Also, the top scoring man and woman earned an additional cash prize. The scores from this event do not contribute to Saturday's team competition.

==== Overall results ====
Each skater earned points for their team based on placement in their group: 12 points for first place, 10 points for second place, and 8 points for third place. Shoma Uno and Evgenia Medvedeva had the highest scores of the night, earning them an additional cash prize.

Rank	Team	M-1	M-2	M-3	L-1	L-2	L-3	Total
1	Asia	12	12	12	10	8	10	64
2	North America	10	10	10	8	12	12	62
3	Europe	8	8	8	12	10	8	54

==== Match-ups ====
Men's group 1
Rank	Name	Team	SP
1	Denis Ten	Asia	92.63
2	Adam Rippon	North America	86.05
3	Mikhail Kolyada	Europe	70.60

Men's group 2
Rank	Name	Team	SP
1	Shoma Uno	Asia	105.74
2	Nam Nguyen	North America	64.91
3	Michal Březina	Europe	64.54

Men's group 3
Rank	Name	Team	SP
1	Jin Boyang	Asia	93.18
2	Jason Brown	North America	87.72
3	Sergei Voronov	Europe	62.55

Ladies' group 1
Rank	Name	Team	SP
1	Evgenia Medvedeva	Europe	77.56
2	Satoko Miyahara	Asia	73.28
3	Gracie Gold	North America	71.34

Ladies' group 2
Rank	Name	Team	SP
1	Gabrielle Daleman	North America	68.45
2	Roberta Rodeghiero	Europe	61.75
3	Rika Hongo	Asia	60.43

Ladies' group 3
Rank	Name	Team	SP
1	Ashley Wagner	North America	74.54
2	Elizabet Tursynbayeva	Asia	65.44
3	Elena Radionova	Europe	61.36

=== Team Challenge competition ===
On Saturday, April 23, skaters competed with their free skating/dance programs. The team with the highest aggregate score won this segment of the Team Challenge Cup. Also, the top scoring pairs and dance couple earned an additional cash prize. The scores from Friday's event do not contribute to the event's final results.

==== Overall results ====
For each team, the highest dance score, the highest pair score, the two highest ladies scores, and the two highest men scores were combined. Meagan Duhamel / Eric Radford and Kaitlyn Weaver / Andrew Poje earned an additional cash prize for being the highest scoring pair and dance couple. Team North America was the overall winner of the competition.

Rank	Team	P	D	M-1	M-2	L-1	L-2	Total
1	North America	147.48	111.56	181.50	166.68	143.20	142.00	892.42
2	Europe	130.46	108.96	165.48	158.30	151.55	133.31	848.06
3	Asia	118.78	83.18	192.92	156.71	145.02	123.61	820.22

==== Discipline results ====
Pairs
Rank	Name	Team	FS	TT?
1	Meagan Duhamel / Eric Radford	North America	147.48	x
2	Ksenia Stolbova / Fedor Klimov	Europe	130.46	x
3	Alexa Scimeca / Chris Knierim	North America	122.15	
4	Wang Xuehan / Wang Lei	Asia	118.78	x
5	Nicole Della Monica / Matteo Guarise	Europe	105.88	
6	Sumire Suto / Francis Boudreau-Audet	Asia	100.78	

Ice dancing
Rank	Name	Team	FD	TT?
1	Kaitlyn Weaver / Andrew Poje	North America	111.56	x
2	Madison Chock / Evan Bates	North America	111.30	
3	Anna Cappellini / Luca Lanotte	Europe	108.96	x
4	Penny Coomes / Nicholas Buckland	Europe	100.90	
5	Wang Shiyue / Liu Xinyu	Asia	83.18	x
6	Rebeka Kim / Kirill Minov	Asia	82.18	

Men's singles
Rank	Name	Team	FS	TT?
1	Shoma Uno	Asia	192.92	x
2	Jason Brown	North America	181.50	x
3	Adam Rippon	North America	166.68	x
4	Mikhail Kolyada	Europe	165.48	x
5	Michal Březina	Europe	158.30	x
6	Jin Boyang	Asia	156.71	x
7	Denis Ten	Asia	147.77	
8	Sergei Voronov	Europe	132.79	
9	Nam Nguyen	North America	127.10	

Ladies' singles
Rank	Name	Team	FS	TT?
1	Evgenia Medvedeva	Europe	151.55	x
2	Satoko Miyahara	Asia	145.02	x
3	Ashley Wagner	North America	143.20	x
4	Gracie Gold	North America	142.00	x
5	Elena Radionova	Europe	133.31	x
6	Elizabet Tursynbayeva	Asia	123.61	x
7	Rika Hongo	Asia	122.15	
8	Gabrielle Daleman	North America	115.93	
9	Roberta Rodeghiero	Europe	105.00	
