= 2018 World Figure Skating Championships =

Figure skating competition

- Type: ISU Championship
- Date: 19–25 March 2018
- Season: 2017–18
- Location: Milan, Italy
- Venue: Mediolanum Forum

Champions
- Men's singles: (United States) Nathan Chen
- Ladies' singles: (Canada) Kaetlyn Osmond
- Pairs: (Germany) Aliona Savchenko / Bruno Massot
- Ice dance: (France) Gabriella Papadakis / Guillaume Cizeron
- Previous: 2017 World Championships
- Next: 2019 World Championships

The 2018 World Figure Skating Championships were held in Milan, Italy from 19–25 March 2018, at the Mediolanum Forum.

== Records ==
The following new ISU best scores were set during this competition:

Event	Component	Skater(s)	Score	Date	Ref
Pairs	Free skating	(Germany) Aliona Savchenko / Bruno Massot	162.86	22 March 2018	
Pairs	Total score	(Germany) Aliona Savchenko / Bruno Massot	245.84	22 March 2018	
Ice dance	Short dance	(France) Gabriella Papadakis / Guillaume Cizeron	83.73	23 March 2018	
Ice dance	Free dance	(France) Gabriella Papadakis / Guillaume Cizeron	123.47	24 March 2018	
Ice dance	Total score	(France) Gabriella Papadakis / Guillaume Cizeron	207.20	24 March 2018	

== Qualification ==
=== Age and minimum TES requirements ===
Skaters are eligible for the 2018 World Championships if they turned 15 years of age before 1 July 2017 and have met the minimum technical elements score requirements. The ISU accepts scores if they were obtained at senior-level ISU-recognized international competitions at least 21 days before the first official practice day of the championships.

Minimum technical scores (TES)
Discipline	SP / SD	FS / FD
Men	34	64
Ladies	27	47
Pairs	25	43
Ice dance	29	39
Must be achieved at an ISU-recognized international event in the ongoing or preceding season. SP and FS scores may be attained at different events.

=== Number of entries per discipline ===
Based on the results of the 2017 World Championships, each ISU member nation can field one to three entries per discipline.

Spots	Men	Ladies	Pairs	Dance
3	Japan; United States	Russia; Canada; United States	China; Russia; Canada	Canada; United States
2	China; Spain; Canada; Russia; Israel	Japan; Italy; Kazakhstan; South Korea	Germany; France; Italy; United States	France; Russia; Italy
If not listed above, one entry is allowed.

== Schedule ==
Day	Date	Start	Finish	Discipline	Event
Day 1	March 21	10:45	16:36	Ladies	Short program
Day 1	March 21	17:30	18:00		Opening ceremony
Day 1	March 21	18:20	23:00	Pairs	Short program
Day 2	March 22	10:05	15:43	Men	Short program
Day 2	March 22	18:55	21:54	Pairs	Free skating
Day 2	March 22			Pairs	Victory ceremony
Day 3	March 23	11:00	15:57	Dance	Short dance
Day 3	March 23	18:35	22:25	Ladies	Free skating
Day 3	March 23			Ladies	Victory ceremony
Day 4	March 24	10:00	14:04	Men	Free skating
Day 4	March 24			Men	Victory ceremony
Day 4	March 24	15:20	18:36	Dance	Free dance
Day 4	March 24			Dance	Victory ceremony
Day 5	March 25	14:30	17:00		Exhibition gala

Note: times are local times (UTC+1 from March 21 through March 24 and UTC+2 on March 25).

== Entries ==
Member nations began announcing their selections in December 2017. The International Skating Union published the full list of entries on 28 February 2018. None of the previous year's defending champions competed.

Country	Men	Ladies	Pairs	Ice dance
Armenia	Slavik Hayrapetyan			Tina Garabedian / Simon Proulx-Sénécal
Australia	Brendan Kerry	Kailani Craine	Ekaterina Alexandrovskaya / Harley Windsor	Chantelle Kerry / Andrew Dodds
Austria		Alisa Stomakhina	Miriam Ziegler / Severin Kiefer	
Azerbaijan	Larry Loupolover			
Belarus				Viktoria Kavaliova / Yurii Bieliaiev
Belgium		Loena Hendrickx		
Brazil		Isadora Williams		
Bulgaria				Teodora Markova / Simon Daze
Canada	Keegan Messing; Nam Nguyen	Larkyn Austman; Gabrielle Daleman; Kaetlyn Osmond	Kirsten Moore-Towers / Michael Marinaro; Camille Ruest / Andrew Wolfe; Julianne Séguin / Charlie Bilodeau	Piper Gilles / Paul Poirier; Carolane Soucisse / Shane Firus; Kaitlyn Weaver / Andrew Poje
China	Jin Boyang	Li Xiangning	Peng Cheng / Jin Yang; Yu Xiaoyu / Zhang Hao	Wang Shiyue / Liu Xinyu
Chinese Taipei	Chih-I Tsao	Amy Lin		
Croatia	Nicholas Vrdoljak		Lana Petranović / Antonio Souza-Kordeiru	
Czech Republic	Michal Březina	Eliška Březinová	Anna Dušková / Martin Bidař	Cortney Mansour / Michal Češka
Estonia		Gerli Liinamäe		
Finland	Valtter Virtanen	Viveca Lindfors		Cecilia Törn / Jussiville Partanen
France	Romain Ponsart	Laurine Lecavelier	Lola Esbrat / Andrei Novoselov; Vanessa James / Morgan Ciprès	Marie-Jade Lauriault / Romain Le Gac; Gabriella Papadakis / Guillaume Cizeron
Georgia	Morisi Kvitelashvili			
Germany	Paul Fentz	Nicole Schott	Annika Hocke / Ruben Blommaert; Aliona Savchenko / Bruno Massot	Kavita Lorenz / Joti Polizoakis
Great Britain	Phillip Harris	Natasha McKay	Zoe Jones / Christopher Boyadji	Lilah Fear / Lewis Gibson
Hungary		Ivett Tóth	Elizaveta Kashitsyna / Márk Magyar	Anna Yanovskaya / Ádám Lukács
Israel	Oleksii Bychenko; Daniel Samohin		Paige Conners / Evgeni Krasnopolski	Adel Tankova / Ronald Zilberberg
Italy	Matteo Rizzo	Carolina Kostner; Elisabetta Leccardi	Nicole Della Monica / Matteo Guarise; Valentina Marchei / Ondřej Hotárek	Anna Cappellini / Luca Lanotte; Charlène Guignard / Marco Fabbri
Japan	Keiji Tanaka; Kazuki Tomono; Shoma Uno	Wakaba Higuchi; Satoko Miyahara	Miu Suzaki / Ryuichi Kihara	Kana Muramoto / Chris Reed
Kazakhstan	Abzal Rakimgaliev	Elizabet Tursynbayeva		
Latvia	Deniss Vasiļjevs	Angelīna Kučvaļska		
Lithuania		Elžbieta Kropa		Allison Reed / Saulius Ambrulevičius
Malaysia	Julian Yee			
Mexico	Donovan Carrillo			
North Korea			Ryom Tae-ok / Kim Ju-sik	
Norway		Anne Line Gjersem		
Poland	Ihor Reznichenko			Natalia Kaliszek / Maksym Spodyriev
South Korea	Kim Jin-seo	Choi Da-bin; Kim Ha-nul	Kim Kyu-eun / Alex Kangchan Kam	Yura Min / Alexander Gamelin
Russia	Dmitri Aliev; Mikhail Kolyada	Stanislava Konstantinova; Maria Sotskova; Alina Zagitova	Kristina Astakhova / Alexei Rogonov; Evgenia Tarasova / Vladimir Morozov; Natalya Zabiyako / Alexander Enbert	Alexandra Stepanova / Ivan Bukin; Tiffany Zahorski / Jonathan Guerreiro
Serbia		Antonina Dubinina		
Slovakia		Nicole Rajičová		Lucie Myslivečková / Lukáš Csölley
Slovenia		Daša Grm		
Spain	Javier Raya		Laura Barquero / Aritz Maestu	Olivia Smart / Adriàn Díaz
Sweden	Alexander Majorov	Anita Östlund		
Switzerland	Stéphane Walker	Alexia Paganini	Ioulia Chtchetinina / Mikhail Akulov	
Turkey	Burak Demirboğa			Alisa Agafonova / Alper Uçar
Ukraine	Ivan Pavlov			Oleksandra Nazarova / Maxim Nikitin
United States	Max Aaron; Nathan Chen; Vincent Zhou	Mariah Bell; Mirai Nagasu; Bradie Tennell	Alexa Scimeca Knierim / Chris Knierim; Deanna Stellato / Nathan Bartholomay	Madison Chock / Evan Bates; Kaitlin Hawayek / Jean-Luc Baker; Madison Hubbell / Zachary Donohue
Uzbekistan	Misha Ge			

=== Changes to preliminary assignments ===
Announced	Country	Discipline	Initial	Replacement	Reason for WD/ Other notes
	Canada	Men	Patrick Chan	Nam Nguyen	Chan retired after the Olympics.
16 February	Canada	Pairs	Meagan Duhamel / Eric Radford	Camille Ruest / Andrew Wolfe	Duhamel/Radford retired after the Olympics. Ilyushechkina/ Moscovitch were the first alternates but declined.
20 February	Canada	Ice dance	Tessa Virtue / Scott Moir	Carolane Soucisse / Shane Firus	
20 February	Spain	Men	Javier Fernández	None	
25 February	Russia	Pairs	Ksenia Stolbova / Fedor Klimov	Kristina Astakhova / Alexei Rogonov	Stolbova's leg injury.
28 February	Russia	Ice dance	Ekaterina Bobrova / Dmitri Soloviev	Tiffany Zahorski / Jonathan Guerreiro	Fatigue
	Great Britain	Ice dance	Penny Coomes / Nicholas Buckland	Lilah Fear / Lewis Gibson	Coomes' knee injury rehabilitation.
2 March	United States	Men	Adam Rippon	Max Aaron	Jason Brown and Ross Miner declined invitations.
2 March	United States	Ice dance	Maia Shibutani / Alex Shibutani	Kaitlin Hawayek / Jean-Luc Baker	
7 March	Japan	Men	Yuzuru Hanyu	Kazuki Tomono	Pain in Hanyu's right ankle. Takahito Mura declined and retired.
7 March	Philippines	Ladies	Alisson Perticheto	None	
9 March	China	Pairs	Sui Wenjing / Han Cong	None	Stress fracture in Sui's foot.
13 March	Russia	Ladies	Evgenia Medvedeva	Stanislava Konstantinova	Stress fracture in right foot.
13 March	Ukraine	Ladies	Anna Khnychenkova	None	
16 March	United States	Ladies	Karen Chen	Mariah Bell	Ashley Wagner declined an invitation.
16 March	United States	Pairs	Tarah Kayne / Daniel O'Shea	Deanna Stellato / Nathan Bartholomay	
16 March	Azerbaijan	Pairs	Sofiya Karagodina / Semyon Stepanov	None	
16 March	Kazakhstan	Men	Denis Ten	Abzal Rakimgaliev	

== Results ==
=== Men ===
Rank	Name	Nation	Total points	SP		FS	
1	Nathan Chen	United States	321.40	1	101.94	1	219.46
2	Shoma Uno	Japan	273.77	5	94.26	2	179.51
3	Mikhail Kolyada	Russia	272.32	2	100.08	4	172.24
4	Alexei Bychenko	Israel	258.28	7	90.99	7	167.29
5	Kazuki Tomono	Japan	256.11	11	82.61	3	173.50
6	Deniss Vasiļjevs	Latvia	254.86	9	84.25	5	170.61
7	Dmitri Aliev	Russia	252.30	13	82.15	6	170.15
8	Keegan Messing	Canada	252.30	6	93.00	11	159.30
9	Misha Ge	Uzbekistan	249.57	8	86.01	9	163.56
10	Michal Březina	Czech Republic	243.99	17	78.01	8	165.98
11	Max Aaron	United States	241.49	15	79.78	10	161.71
12	Alexander Majorov	Sweden	237.79	10	82.71	13	155.08
13	Keiji Tanaka	Japan	236.66	14	80.17	12	156.49
14	Vincent Zhou	United States	235.24	3	96.78	19	138.46
15	Paul Fentz	Germany	230.92	12	82.49	16	148.43
16	Romain Ponsart	France	229.20	16	79.55	14	149.65
17	Matteo Rizzo	Italy	225.44	18	77.43	17	148.01
18	Brendan Kerry	Australia	223.85	19	74.99	15	148.86
19	Jin Boyang	China	223.41	4	95.85	23	127.56
20	Daniel Samohin	Israel	214.01	20	72.78	18	141.23
21	Julian Zhi Jie Yee	Malaysia	209.03	21	72.43	20	136.60
22	Donovan Carrillo	Mexico	200.76	24	68.13	21	132.63
23	Slavik Hayrapetyan	Armenia	199.72	23	68.18	22	131.54
24	Phillip Harris	Great Britain	187.69	22	68.59	24	119.10
Did not advance to free skating
25	Nam Nguyen	Canada	67.79	25	67.79	—N/a	
26	Morisi Kvitelashvili	Georgia	67.01	26	67.01	—N/a	
27	Stéphane Walker	Switzerland	65.79	27	65.79	—N/a	
28	Burak Demirboğa	Turkey	65.43	28	65.43	—N/a	
29	Ivan Pavlov	Ukraine	64.18	29	64.18	—N/a	
30	Chih-I Tsao	Chinese Taipei	64.06	30	64.06	—N/a	
31	Larry Loupolover	Azerbaijan	61.82	31	61.82	—N/a	
32	Abzal Rakimgaliev	Kazakhstan	61.19	32	61.19	—N/a	
33	Kim Jin-seo	South Korea	60.72	33	60.72	—N/a	
34	Nicholas Vrdoljak	Croatia	59.74	34	59.74	—N/a	
35	Valtter Virtanen	Finland	55.49	35	55.49	—N/a	
36	Ihor Reznichenko	Poland	51.70	36	51.70	—N/a	
37	Javier Raya	Spain	50.00	37	50.00	—N/a	

=== Ladies ===
Rank	Name	Nation	Total points	SP		FS	
1	Kaetlyn Osmond	Canada	223.23	4	72.73	1	150.50
2	Wakaba Higuchi	Japan	210.90	8	65.89	2	145.01
3	Satoko Miyahara	Japan	210.08	3	74.36	3	135.72
4	Carolina Kostner	Italy	208.88	1	80.27	5	128.61
5	Alina Zagitova	Russia	207.72	2	79.51	7	128.21
6	Bradie Tennell	United States	199.89	7	68.76	4	131.13
7	Gabrielle Daleman	Canada	196.72	6	71.61	8	125.11
8	Maria Sotskova	Russia	196.61	5	71.80	9	124.81
9	Loena Hendrickx	Belgium	192.31	10	64.07	6	128.24
10	Mirai Nagasu	United States	187.52	9	65.21	11	122.31
11	Elizabet Tursynbayeva	Kazakhstan	186.85	11	62.38	10	124.47
12	Mariah Bell	United States	174.40	17	59.15	12	115.25
13	Nicole Schott	Germany	174.13	12	61.84	14	112.29
14	Laurine Lecavelier	France	173.23	15	59.79	13	113.44
15	Kim Ha-nul	South Korea	170.68	14	60.14	15	110.54
16	Viveca Lindfors	Finland	166.23	13	60.18	16	106.05
17	Kailani Craine	Australia	154.41	20	56.90	18	97.51
18	Eliška Březinová	Czech Republic	153.14	18	58.37	19	94.77
19	Stanislava Konstantinova	Russia	153.03	16	59.19	20	93.84
20	Alexia Paganini	Switzerland	149.66	19	57.86	22	91.80
21	Elisabetta Leccardi	Italy	149.17	23	51.13	17	98.04
22	Daša Grm	Slovenia	144.51	22	52.43	21	92.08
23	Ivett Tóth	Hungary	136.87	24	50.63	23	86.24
WD	Choi Da-bin	South Korea	55.30	21	55.30	—N/a	
Did not advance to free skating
25	Larkyn Austman	Canada	50.17	25	50.17	—N/a	
26	Li Xiangning	China	50.06	26	50.06	—N/a	
27	Nicole Rajičová	Slovakia	49.87	27	49.87	—N/a	
28	Amy Lin	Chinese Taipei	49.31	28	49.31	—N/a	
29	Anita Östlund	Sweden	48.99	29	48.99	—N/a	
30	Alisa Stomakhina	Austria	48.71	30	48.71	—N/a	
31	Elžbieta Kropa	Lithuania	46.53	31	46.53	—N/a	
32	Natasha McKay	Great Britain	45.89	32	45.89	—N/a	
33	Anne Line Gjersem	Norway	45.25	33	45.25	—N/a	
34	Gerli Liinamäe	Estonia	45.14	34	45.14	—N/a	
35	Isadora Williams	Brazil	42.16	35	42.16	—N/a	
36	Antonina Dubinina	Serbia	41.40	36	41.40	—N/a	
37	Angelīna Kučvaļska	Latvia	35.78	37	35.78	—N/a	

=== Pairs ===
Rank	Name	Nation	Total points	SP		FS	
1	Aliona Savchenko / Bruno Massot	Germany	245.84	1	82.98	1	162.86
2	Evgenia Tarasova / Vladimir Morozov	Russia	225.53	2	81.29	2	144.24
3	Vanessa James / Morgan Ciprès	France	218.36	3	75.32	3	143.04
4	Natalya Zabiyako / Alexander Enbert	Russia	207.88	4	74.38	6	133.50
5	Nicole Della Monica / Matteo Guarise	Italy	206.06	5	72.53	5	133.53
6	Kirsten Moore-Towers / Michael Marinaro	Canada	204.33	10	70.49	4	133.84
7	Yu Xiaoyu / Zhang Hao	China	203.36	9	71.31	7	132.05
8	Kristina Astakhova / Alexei Rogonov	Russia	202.16	7	71.62	9	130.54
9	Peng Cheng / Jin Yang	China	202.07	6	71.98	10	130.09
10	Valentina Marchei / Ondřej Hotárek	Italy	202.02	8	71.37	8	130.65
11	Anna Dušková / Martin Bidař	Czech Republic	189.60	13	66.29	11	123.31
12	Ryom Tae-ok / Kim Ju-sik	North Korea	188.77	12	66.32	12	122.45
13	Annika Hocke / Ruben Blommaert	Germany	184.83	16	63.26	13	121.57
14	Miriam Ziegler / Severin Kiefer	Austria	184.30	14	65.21	14	119.09
15	Alexa Scimeca Knierim / Chris Knierim	United States	182.04	11	69.55	15	112.49
16	Ekaterina Alexandrovskaya / Harley Windsor	Australia	177.46	15	65.02	16	112.44
Did not advance to free skating
17	Deanna Stellato / Nathan Bartholomay	United States	61.48	17	61.48	—N/a	
18	Camille Ruest / Andrew Wolfe	Canada	59.98	18	59.98	—N/a	
19	Paige Conners / Evgeni Krasnopolski	Israel	58.44	19	58.44	—N/a	
20	Laura Barquero / Aritz Maestu	Spain	58.36	20	58.36	—N/a	
21	Lana Petranović / Antonio Souza-Kordeiru	Croatia	57.25	21	57.25	—N/a	
22	Julianne Séguin / Charlie Bilodeau	Canada	55.68	22	55.68	—N/a	
23	Ioulia Chtchetinina / Mikhail Akulov	Switzerland	53.62	23	53.62	—N/a	
24	Miu Suzaki / Ryuichi Kihara	Japan	53.33	24	53.33	—N/a	
25	Lola Esbrat / Andrei Novoselov	France	51.94	25	51.94	—N/a	
26	Kyu-eun Kim / Alex Kangchan Kam	South Korea	42.85	26	42.85	—N/a	
27	Zoe Jones / Christopher Boyadji	Great Britain	42.02	27	42.02	—N/a	
28	Elizaveta Kashitsyna / Márk Magyar	Hungary	36.33	28	36.33	—N/a	

=== Ice dance ===
Rank	Name	Nation	Total points	SD		FD	
1	Gabriella Papadakis / Guillaume Cizeron	France	207.20	1	83.73	1	123.47
2	Madison Hubbell / Zachary Donohue	United States	196.64	2	80.42	2	116.22
3	Kaitlyn Weaver / Andrew Poje	Canada	192.35	3	78.31	4	114.04
4	Anna Cappellini / Luca Lanotte	Italy	192.08	4	77.46	3	114.62
5	Madison Chock / Evan Bates	United States	187.28	5	75.66	5	111.62
6	Piper Gilles / Paul Poirier	Canada	186.10	6	74.51	6	111.59
7	Alexandra Stepanova / Ivan Bukin	Russia	184.01	7	74.50	7	109.51
8	Tiffany Zahorski / Jonathan Guerreiro	Russia	180.42	8	72.45	8	107.97
9	Charlène Guignard / Marco Fabbri	Italy	178.44	9	71.15	9	107.29
10	Kaitlin Hawayek / Jean-Luc Baker	United States	165.28	15	63.48	10	101.80
11	Kana Muramoto / Chris Reed	Japan	164.38	10	65.65	11	98.73
12	Olivia Smart / Adriàn Díaz	Spain	162.05	12	63.73	12	98.32
13	Marie-Jade Lauriault / Romain Le Gac	France	159.64	14	63.50	13	96.14
14	Carolane Soucisse / Shane Firus	Canada	159.46	11	64.02	14	95.44
15	Oleksandra Nazarova / Maxim Nikitin	Ukraine	158.40	16	63.35	15	95.05
16	Kavita Lorenz / Joti Polizoakis	Germany	157.02	17	62.08	16	94.94
17	Natalia Kaliszek / Maksym Spodyriev	Poland	151.46	13	63.70	19	87.76
18	Wang Shiyue / Liu Xinyu	China	150.75	19	61.18	17	89.57
19	Alisa Agafonova / Alper Uçar	Turkey	149.05	20	60.38	18	88.67
20	Allison Reed / Saulius Ambrulevičius	Lithuania	148.30	18	61.33	20	86.97
Did not advance to free dance
21	Yura Min / Alexander Gamelin	South Korea	58.82	21	58.82	—N/a	
22	Tina Garabedian / Simon Proulx-Sénécal	Armenia	58.64	22	58.64	—N/a	
23	Cecilia Törn / Jussiville Partanen	Finland	57.96	23	57.96	—N/a	
24	Lilah Fear / Lewis Gibson	Great Britain	57.56	24	57.56	—N/a	
25	Lucie Myslivečková / Lukáš Csölley	Slovakia	55.54	25	55.54	—N/a	
26	Cortney Mansour / Michal Češka	Czech Republic	55.27	26	55.27	—N/a	
27	Anna Yanovskaya / Ádám Lukács	Hungary	54.11	27	54.11	—N/a	
28	Viktoria Kavaliova / Yurii Bieliaiev	Belarus	50.40	28	50.40	—N/a	
29	Teodora Markova / Simon Daze	Bulgaria	47.57	29	47.57	—N/a	
30	Chantelle Kerry / Andrew Dodds	Australia	46.05	30	46.05	—N/a	
31	Adel Tankova / Ronald Zilberberg	Israel	43.50	31	43.50	—N/a	

== Medals summary ==
=== Medalists ===
Medals for overall placement:

Discipline	Gold	Silver	Bronze
Men	(United States) Nathan Chen	(Japan) Shoma Uno	(Russia) Mikhail Kolyada
Ladies	(Canada) Kaetlyn Osmond	(Japan) Wakaba Higuchi	(Japan) Satoko Miyahara
Pairs	(Germany) Aliona Savchenko / Bruno Massot	(Russia) Evgenia Tarasova / Vladimir Morozov	(France) Vanessa James / Morgan Ciprès
Ice dance	(France) Gabriella Papadakis / Guillaume Cizeron	(United States) Madison Hubbell / Zachary Donohue	(Canada) Kaitlyn Weaver / Andrew Poje

Small medals for placement in the short segment:

Discipline	Gold	Silver	Bronze
Men	(United States) Nathan Chen	(Russia) Mikhail Kolyada	(United States) Vincent Zhou
Ladies	(Italy) Carolina Kostner	(Russia) Alina Zagitova	(Japan) Satoko Miyahara
Pairs	(Germany) Aliona Savchenko / Bruno Massot	(Russia) Evgenia Tarasova / Vladimir Morozov	(France) Vanessa James / Morgan Ciprès
Ice dance	(France) Gabriella Papadakis / Guillaume Cizeron	(United States) Madison Hubbell / Zachary Donohue	(Canada) Kaitlyn Weaver / Andrew Poje

Small medals for placement in the free segment:

Discipline	Gold	Silver	Bronze
Men	(United States) Nathan Chen	(Japan) Shoma Uno	(Japan) Kazuki Tomono
Ladies	(Canada) Kaetlyn Osmond	(Japan) Wakaba Higuchi	(Japan) Satoko Miyahara
Pairs	(Germany) Aliona Savchenko / Bruno Massot	(Russia) Evgenia Tarasova / Vladimir Morozov	(France) Vanessa James / Morgan Ciprès
Ice dance	(France) Gabriella Papadakis / Guillaume Cizeron	(United States) Madison Hubbell / Zachary Donohue	(Italy) Anna Cappellini / Luca Lanotte

=== By country ===
Table of medals for overall placement:

Rank	Nation	Gold	Silver	Bronze	Total
1	United States (USA)	1	1	0	2
2	Canada (CAN)	1	0	1	2
2	France (FRA)	1	0	1	2
4	Germany (GER)	1	0	0	1
5	Japan (JPN)	0	2	1	3
6	Russia (RUS)	0	1	1	2
Totals (6 entries)		4	4	4	12
