= 2015 CS Golden Spin of Zagreb =

2015 Golden Spin of Zagreb
- Type: ISU Challenger Series
- Date: December 2 – 5
- Season: 2015–16
- Location: Zagreb
- Host: Croatian Skating Federation
- Venue: Dom sportova

Champions
- Men's singles: (Kazakhstan) Denis Ten
- Ladies' singles: (Russia) Elizaveta Tuktamysheva
- Pairs: (Russia) Evgenia Tarasova / Vladimir Morozov
- Ice dance: (Italy) Charlène Guignard / Marco Fabbri
- Previous: 2014 CS Golden Spin of Zagreb
- Next: 2016 CS Golden Spin of Zagreb

The 2015 Golden Spin of Zagreb was the 48th edition of the annual senior-level international figure skating competition held in Zagreb, Croatia. It was held at the Dom sportova in December 2015 as part of the 2015–16 ISU Challenger Series. Medals were awarded in the disciplines of men's singles, ladies' singles, pair skating, and ice dancing.

== Entries ==
The preliminary entries were published on 16 November 2015.

Country	Men	Ladies	Pairs	Ice dancing
Armenia				Tina Garabedian / Simon Proulx-Sénécal
Bulgaria		Hristina Vassileva		
Canada	Liam Firus			
Chinese Taipei		Amy Lin		
Croatia	Nicholas Vrdoljak	Tena Čopor	Lana Petranović / Michael Lueck	
Czech Republic	Michal Březina			
Denmark				Laurence Fournier Beaudry / Nikolaj Sørensen
Finland	Tomi Pulkkinen; Matthias Versluis	Anni Järvenpää		Olesia Karmi / Max Lindholm
France	Kevin Aymoz; Alexander Zahradnicek			Peroline Ojardias / Michael Bramante
Germany	Alexander Bjelde; Paul Fentz			
Hong Kong	Kwun Hung Leung			
Hungary				Carolina Moscheni / Balázs Major
Ireland	Conor Stakelum			
Israel		Netta Schreiber		
Italy	Mattia Dalla Torre; Ivan Righini; Maurizio Zandron	Carol Bressanutti	Nicole Della Monica / Matteo Guarise; Alexandra Iovanna / Filippo Ambrosini; Bianca Manacorda / Niccolò Macii	Charlène Guignard / Marco Fabbri
Japan			Sumire Suto / Francis Boudreau Audet	Emi Hirai / Marien de la Asuncion
Kazakhstan	Abzal Rakimgaliev; Denis Ten	Elizabet Tursynbayeva		
Netherlands		Niki Wories		
Norway		Anne Line Gjersem		
Philippines	Michael Christian Martinez			
Russia	Gordei Gorshkov; Moris Kvitelashvili; Adian Pitkeev	Alena Leonova; Adelina Sotnikova; Elizaveta Tuktamysheva	Kristina Astakhova / Alexei Rogonov; Evgenia Tarasova / Vladimir Morozov; Natalja Zabijako / Alexander Enbert	
Slovakia	Marco Klepoch			
Slovenia	David Kranjec	Daša Grm		
Spain	Javier Raya	Sonia Lafuente	Marcelina Lech / Aritz Maestu	
Thailand		Thita Lamsam		
United States	Alexander Johnson; Sean Rabbitt; Adam Rippon	Karen Chen; Angela Wang	Marissa Castelli / Mervin Tran; Caitlin Fields / Ernie Utah Stevens; Tarah Kayne / Daniel O'Shea	Kaitlin Hawayek / Jean-Luc Baker

== Results ==
=== Men ===
Rank	Name	Nation	Total	SP		FS	
1	Denis Ten	Kazakhstan	276.39	1	94.03	1	182.36
2	Adam Rippon	United States	237.87	3	72.23	2	165.64
3	Adian Pitkeev	Russia	223.68	5	70.21	3	153.47
4	Gordei Gorshkov	Russia	222.72	2	76.50	4	146.22
5	Moris Kvitelashvili	Russia	212.98	6	68.55	5	144.43
6	Alexander Johnson	United States	212.85	4	71.95	6	140.90
7	Michael Christian Martinez	Philippines	202.82	7	65.66	8	137.16
8	Liam Firus	Canada	199.11	11	61.29	7	137.82
9	Paul Fentz	Germany	189.49	14	56.07	9	133.42
10	Nicholas Vrdoljak	Croatia	181.80	12	59.67	11	122.13
11	Tomi Pulkkinen	Finland	176.85	16	53.72	10	123.13
12	Kevin Aymoz	France	176.66	10	61.77	14	114.89
13	Javier Raya	Spain	175.72	9	62.86	16	112.86
14	Alexander Bjelde	Germany	175.21	8	64.55	17	110.66
15	Sean Rabbitt	United States	174.09	15	54.34	12	119.75
16	Maurizio Zandron	Italy	169.53	17	53.45	13	116.08
17	Abzal Rakimgaliev	Kazakhstan	167.09	18	52.90	15	114.19
18	David Kranjec	Slovenia	164.99	13	59.51	19	105.48
19	Mattia Dalla Torre	Italy	153.92	22	44.39	18	109.53
20	Matthias Versluis	Finland	144.18	19	50.56	20	93.62
21	Kwun Hung Leung	Hong Kong	127.64	20	46.43	21	81.21
22	Conor Stakelum	Ireland	118.34	21	46.22	22	72.12
23	Marco Klepoch	Slovakia	109.62	23	43.34	23	66.28

=== Ladies ===
Rank	Name	Nation	Total	SP		FS	
1	Elizaveta Tuktamysheva	Russia	201.33	1	69.48	1	131.85
2	Elizabet Tursynbayeva	Kazakhstan	176.33	3	56.88	2	119.45
3	Karen Chen	United States	175.35	4	56.82	3	118.53
4	Alena Leonova	Russia	173.24	2	58.86	4	114.38
5	Angela Wang	United States	163.41	5	56.35	5	107.06
6	Adelina Sotnikova	Russia	159.80	7	54.43	6	105.37
7	Amy Lin	Chinese Taipei	142.29	10	47.01	7	95.28
8	Daša Grm	Slovenia	132.11	9	47.81	9	84.30
9	Niki Wories	Netherlands	131.86	8	51.29	10	80.57
10	Anne Line Gjersem	Norway	131.01	12	44.38	8	86.63
11	Anni Järvenpää	Finland	130.47	6	54.88	11	75.59
12	Sonia Lafuente	Spain	118.85	11	45.76	12	73.09
13	Carol Bressanutti	Italy	102.35	14	34.85	13	67.50
14	Thita Lamsam	Thailand	94.31	13	37.49	16	56.82
15	Tena Čopor	Croatia	93.78	15	31.66	14	62.12
16	Hristina Vassileva	Bulgaria	91.64	16	31.04	15	60.60

=== Pairs ===
Rank	Name	Nation	Total	SP		FS	
1	Evgenia Tarasova / Vladimir Morozov	Russia	192.22	1	73.06	2	119.16
2	Kristina Astakhova / Alexei Rogonov	Russia	183.88	2	65.06	3	118.82
3	Tarah Kayne / Daniel O'Shea	United States	174.96	6	55.58	1	119.38
4	Natalja Zabijako / Alexander Enbert	Russia	173.62	4	60.96	4	112.66
5	Marissa Castelli / Mervin Tran	United States	171.00	3	62.66	5	108.34
6	Nicole Della Monica / Matteo Guarise	Italy	163.78	5	58.66	6	105.12
7	Sumire Suto / Francis Boudreau Audet	Japan	137.06	8	46.62	7	90.44
8	Caitlin Fields / Ernie Utah Stevens	United States	126.12	7	47.72	8	78.40
9	Bianca Manacorda / Niccolò Macii	Italy	117.72	9	41.08	9	76.64
10	Lana Petranović / Michael Lueck	Croatia	106.94	11	36.38	10	70.56
11	Marcelina Lech / Aritz Maestu	Spain	105.88	10	39.26	11	66.62
12	Alexandra Iovanna / Filippo Ambrosini	Italy	86.90	12	33.10	12	53.80

=== Ice dancing ===
Rank	Name	Nation	Total	SD		FD	
1	Charlène Guignard / Marco Fabbri	Italy	172.28	1	68.24	1	104.04
2	Kaitlin Hawayek / Jean-Luc Baker	United States	153.06	2	58.76	2	94.30
3	Tina Garabedian / Simon Proulx-Sénécal	Armenia	127.92	4	48.26	3	79.66
4	Emi Hirai / Marien de la Asuncion	Japan	127.92	3	51.04	4	76.88
5	Olesia Karmi / Max Lindholm	Finland	117.02	5	46.62	5	70.40
6	Peroline Ojardias / Michael Bramante	France	110.32	7	40.64	6	69.68
7	Carolina Moscheni / Balázs Major	Hungary	110.06	6	45.32	7	64.74
