= Mikhail Kolyada =

Russian figure skater (born 1995)

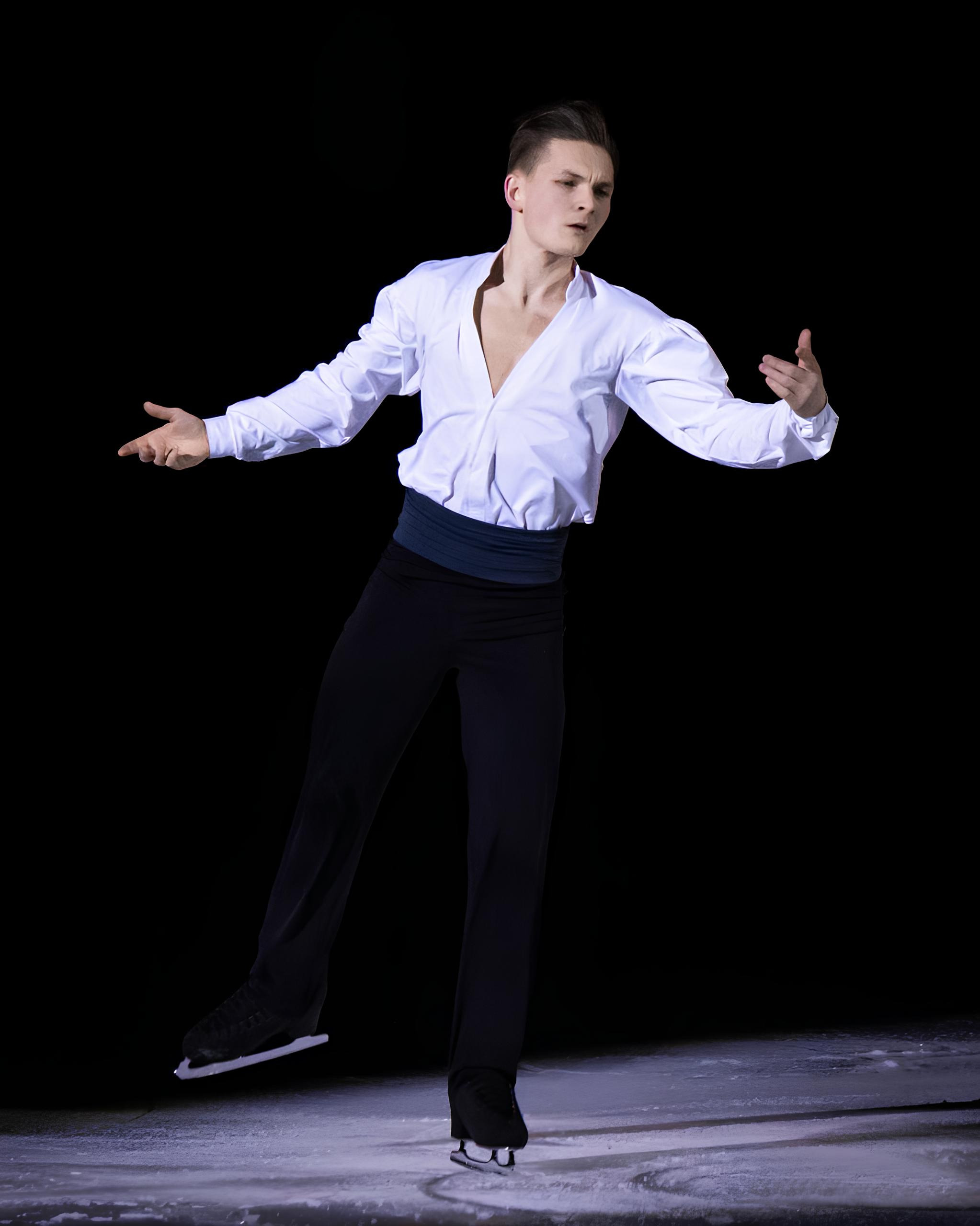
- Kolyada in 2024

Personal information
- Native name: Михаил Сергеевич Коляда
- Full name: Mikhail Sergeyevich Kolyada
- Born: 18 February 1995 (age 31) Saint Petersburg, Russia
- Height: 1.67 m (5 ft 6 in)

Figure skating career
- Country: Russia
- Discipline: Men's singles
- Coach: Alexei Mishin; Tatiana Prokofieva
- Skating club: Olympic School "Zvezdny Led", Saint-Petersburg
- Began skating: 2000
- Highest WS: 4th (2018–19)

Medal record
Event	Gold medal – first place	Silver medal – second place	Bronze medal – third place
Olympic Games	0	1	0
World Championships	0	0	1
European Championships	0	0	2
Grand Prix Final	0	0	1
Russian Championships	3	3	0
World Team Trophy	1	1	0
Medal list
Olympic Games
Silver medal – second place	2018 Pyeongchang	Team
World Championships
Bronze medal – third place	2018 Milan	Singles
European Championships
Bronze medal – third place	2017 Ostrava	Singles
Bronze medal – third place	2018 Moscow	Singles
Grand Prix Final
Bronze medal – third place	2017–18 Nagoya	Singles
Russian Championships
Gold medal – first place	2017 Chelyabinsk	Singles
Gold medal – first place	2018 Saint Petersburg	Singles
Gold medal – first place	2021 Chelyabinsk	Singles
Silver medal – second place	2016 Yekaterinburg	Singles
Silver medal – second place	2019 Saransk	Singles
Silver medal – second place	2022 Saint Petersburg	Singles
World Team Trophy
Gold medal – first place	2021 Osaka	Team
Silver medal – second place	2017 Tokyo	Team

Mikhail Sergeyevich Kolyada (Russian: Михаил Сергеевич Коляда, IPA: [mʲɪxɐˈil kəlʲɪˈda]; born 18 February 1995) is a Russian figure skater. He is a 2018 Olympic silver medalist in the team event, the 2018 World bronze medalist, a two-time European bronze medalist (2017, 2018), the 2017 Grand Prix Final bronze medalist, a five-time Grand Prix medalist, and a three-time Russian national champion (2017, 2018, 2021).

== Personal life ==
Mikhail Sergeyevich Kolyada was born on 18 February 1995 in Saint Petersburg, Russia. He has three younger siblings. He is enrolled at the Lesgaft National State University of Physical Education, Sport and Health. On May 20, 2019, he announced his engagement to pair skater Daria Beklemisheva. Their wedding took place in July 2019.

== Career ==
=== Early years ===
Kolyada began learning to skate in 2000. Coach Valentina Chebotareva invited him to join her group after observing him at a small rink when he was five.

=== 2011–2012 to 2012–2013 ===
Kolyada began competing on the ISU Junior Grand Prix (JGP) series in 2011. In 2013, he won the Russian Junior Championships and was assigned to the World Junior Championships where he finished 6th.

=== 2013–2014 season ===
Kolyada won silver and bronze medals on the JGP series, becoming the first alternate for the Junior Grand Prix Final. After placing sixth in the short program at the senior Russian Championships, he withdrew from the free skate, unable to fix a problem with his boot laces.

=== 2014–2015 season ===
Kolyada fractured his right ankle in August 2014, leading to two surgeries and five months off the ice. He withdrew from the 2014 Rostelecom Cup, which would have been his Grand Prix debut, and the 2015 Russian Championships. In March 2015, he won gold at the Gardena Spring Trophy.

=== 2015–2016 season ===
Kolyada finished third in the Challenger Series (CS) rankings after winning silver at the 2015 Ondrej Nepela Trophy and bronze at the 2015 Ice Challenge. Skating in his first Grand Prix competition, he placed fifth at the 2015 Rostelecom Cup in November. The following month, he won the silver medal at the Russian Championships in Yekaterinburg.

In January 2016, Kolyada placed ninth in the short program, third in the free skate, and fifth overall at the European Championships in Bratislava, Slovakia. From 30 March to 1 April, he competed at the 2016 World Championships in Boston. Ranked sixth in the short and fifth in the free, he finished fourth overall, just missing the bronze to China's Boyang Jin.

=== 2016–2017 season ===
To be competitive, Kolyada upgraded his technical content. He initially planned to incorporate a quad Lutz in his short and long programs but eventually decided that the consistency of the quad Lutz was too risky for the short and a clean program executed perfectly, along with his traditionally high components score, would keep him in the mix overall. He also tried adding a quad Salchow and toe loop in the free skate along with the Lutz.

Kolyada also decided in this season to add a new choreographer to his team, two-time World champion and 2006 Olympic silver medalist Stéphane Lambiel, along with his long-time choreographer, Olga Zotova.

Kolyada placed fourth at the 2016 CS Finlandia Trophy and 2016 Rostelecom Cup. His next Grand Prix assignment was the 2016 NHK Trophy. In December 2016, he won his first Russian national title. At the 2017 European Championships, he won the bronze medal behind Javier Fernández and Maxim Kovtun. He placed fourth in the short program and third in the free skate. In the free program, he fell on a quad Lutz, but the jump was counted as fully rotated. At the 2017 World Championships he placed seventh in the short program and ninth in the free skate, finishing 8th overall. At the 2017 World Team Trophy, he placed fourth in the short program and fifth in the free skate, with Team Russia finishing second place overall. In the free skate and attempted a quad Lutz but fell on the landing, although the jump was counted as fully rotated.

=== 2017–2018 season ===
Kolyada started his season with a gold medal at the 2017 CS Ondrej Nepela Trophy after ranking 10th in the short program and first in the free skate. In the free skate, he landed his first quad lutz in international competition. He placed fourth at the 2017 CS Finlandia Trophy and won the bronze medal at the 2017 Rostelecom Cup, and later the gold medal at the 2017 Cup of China, qualifying him for the Grand Prix Final.

He then had his biggest achievement yet, finishing third at the Grand Prix Final. The following month, he won his second consecutive Russian figure skating title and, despite errors, won bronze for the second consecutive year at the 2018 European Championships.

At the 2018 Winter Olympics, Kolyada was part of the Olympic Athletes from Russia team in the team event. He performed poorly in the short program, falling on both quadruple jump attempts and singling his triple Axel, placing eighth overall. He placed second in the free skate. Team Russia won the silver medal overall. In the men's individual event, he placed eighth.

Kolyada won the bronze medal at the 2018 World Championships in Milan, Italy, being second after the short, but dropping to third after errors in the long.

=== 2018–2019 season ===
Over the summer, Kolyada suffered from sinusitis, which would continue to plague him throughout the fall. He started his season by competing in two ISU Challenger Series events. In mid-September, he won the gold medal at the 2018 CS Ondrej Nepela Trophy, and in early October, he won another gold medal at the 2018 CS Finlandia Trophy. At both events, Kolyada ranked first in both the short program and the free skate. In early November, he placed fourth at the 2018 Grand Prix of Helsinki. Two weeks later, he placed fourth again at the 2018 Rostelecom Cup. In early December, Kolyada competed at the 2018 CS Golden Spin of Zagreb, where he won the silver medal after placing first in the short program and second in the free skate.

Kolyada's sinusitis immediately became serious before the 2019 Russian Championships, leading to his hospitalization and his participation at nationals being uncertain until days prior. Competing in less than top form, he nevertheless won the silver medal, placing second in the short program and third in the free skate.

The European Championships initially went well for Kolyada, with a clean short program earning a personal best score of 100.49 and first place going into the free skate, over eight points ahead of second-place finisher Alexander Samarin. He fell four times in the free program, placing eleventh there, and fifth overall.

At the 2019 World Championships in Saitama, Kolyada placed tenth in the short program after failing to execute his planned quad. He rose to sixth in the free and sixth overall with a program with only minor errors, saying, "there were some little technical issues, but overall, I am pleased with how I did. The audience was very supportive, and I felt that."

=== 2019–2020 season ===
In early October, Kolyada announced that a recurrence of his sinusitis would cause him to miss at least the first half of the season. Coach Valentina Chebotareva expressed the hope that he would be able to return for the 2020 Russian Championships, but ultimately this was not possible. Kolyada resumed training in early January 2020.

In June 2020, it was announced that Kolyada had left his longtime coach Chebotareva to train with Alexei Mishin, the coach of Olympic champions Alexei Urmanov and Evgeni Plushenko.

=== 2020–2021 season ===
Kolyada debuted his new programs at the senior Russian test skates, where his appearance was widely praised as a highlight of the event, with particular emphasis on his free program tribute to legendary ballet dancer Rudolf Nureyev. Kolyada performed only quad toe loops at the event but indicated that he was planning to reintroduce the quad Lutz and Salchow in the future. He next competed at the third stage of the domestic Cup of Russia series, winning the gold medal.

With the COVID-19 pandemic continuing to affect international travel, the Grand Prix was designed primarily around geographic location, and Kolyada was assigned to the 2020 Rostelecom Cup. He placed third in the short program after two minor jump errors. He won the free skate by a wide margin to take the gold medal, his second Grand Prix win.

On December 3, it was announced that Kolyada had to withdraw from the fifth stage of the Cup of Russia series after training mate Elizaveta Tuktamysheva contracted COVID-19. He was ill afterward, though not with the coronavirus, and was able to compete at the 2021 Russian Championships, winning the short program by four points over Makar Ignatov. He won the free skate by almost twenty-five points, reclaiming the Russian title, which he contrasted with his previous wins by saying "this is one of the most meaningful as after a long break it is always hard as well as interesting to come back." He was assigned to the Russian team for the 2021 World Championships in Stockholm.

Following the national championships, Kolyada participated in the 2021 Channel One Trophy, a televised team competition organized in lieu of the cancelled European Championships. Kolyada was selected for the Time of Firsts team captained by Evgenia Medvedeva. He placed first in the short program and then second in the free skate. In the free, he reintroduced the quad Salchow into competition, landing it with a step out. The Time of Firsts team finished in second place. Kolyada opted not to participate in the Russian Cup Final, instead competing at the 2021 Challenge Cup in the Netherlands and winning the gold medal.

Competing at the World Championships, Kolyada placed fourth in the short program after having to execute turns in the middle of his jump combination. In the free skate, he fell on his second triple Axel attempt and had minor errors on two other jumps, but he placed fifth in that segment and took fifth place overall. Kolyada stated that despite the errors, he liked "the program very much, and we'll think about the next season. Alexei Mishin is a very wise mentor, and I trust him completely." Kolyada's placement alongside the eighth-place finish of training mate Evgeni Semenenko qualified two berths for Russian men at the 2022 Winter Olympics, and the possibility of a third.

Kolyada was subsequently announced as part of the Russian team for the 2021 World Team Trophy. Kolyada placed fifth in the short program and third in the free skate, while Team Russia won the gold medal.

=== 2021–2022 season ===
Kolyada collaborated with Ilia Averbukh on his short program, initially debuting one making use of Luciano Pavarotti's "Caruso" at the Russian test skates. They subsequently changed this to Tchaikovsky's The Nutcracker, in a stylistic homage to the Russian ballet dancer Mikhail Baryshnikov. Despite the acclaim for his Nureyev free program from the previous season, he opted against reprising it, instead choosing John Williams' soundtrack to Schindler's List.

Appearing at his first Challenger event since 2018, Kolyada won the silver medal at the 2021 CS Finlandia Trophy.

Kolyada was originally assigned to the 2021 Cup of China as his first Grand Prix assignment, but following that event's cancellation, he was instead reassigned to the 2021 Gran Premio d'Italia in Turin. Despite a fall on his quad toe attempt, he was fourth in the short program, 5.59 points behind Jin Boyang in first place. A new personal best in the free skate moved him up to second place while the skaters ahead of him struggled, but he was himself overtaken by Yuma Kagiyama, who won the gold medal. In his own assessment afterward, he said, "not everything was clean, so I will continue to work hard. I feel that I have started to skate with more confidence, and we will see what happens at the next competition. My coach said we are moving in the right direction, and I believe him." Kolyada struggled in the short program at the 2021 Rostelecom Cup, nevertheless finishing in fourth place due to inconsistent performances from other competitors. He won the free skate despite errors and finished with another silver medal, qualifying for Grand Prix Final for the second time in his career. His coach, Alexei Mishin, later announced that Kolyada would be returning to his Nureyev free program. The Grand Prix Final was subsequently cancelled due to restrictions prompted by the Omicron variant.

The perceived frontrunner heading into the 2022 Russian Championships, Kolyada placed fifth in the short program after singling his planned triple Axel. He won the free skate despite popping two jumps, finishing with the silver medal. He said he had "mixed feelings" about the event. He spoke about returning to his Nureyev program, "I didn't do everything, but it’s the motivation to work more. I haven't skated this program for a while, and I had to remember all emotions again." Kolyada was assigned to the 2022 European Championships but withdrew due to a training injury and was replaced by Andrei Mozalev.

On January 20, Kolyada was officially named to the Russian Olympic team. On the 25th, it was announced he had to withdraw from the competition due to a positive COVID-19 test.

== Programs ==
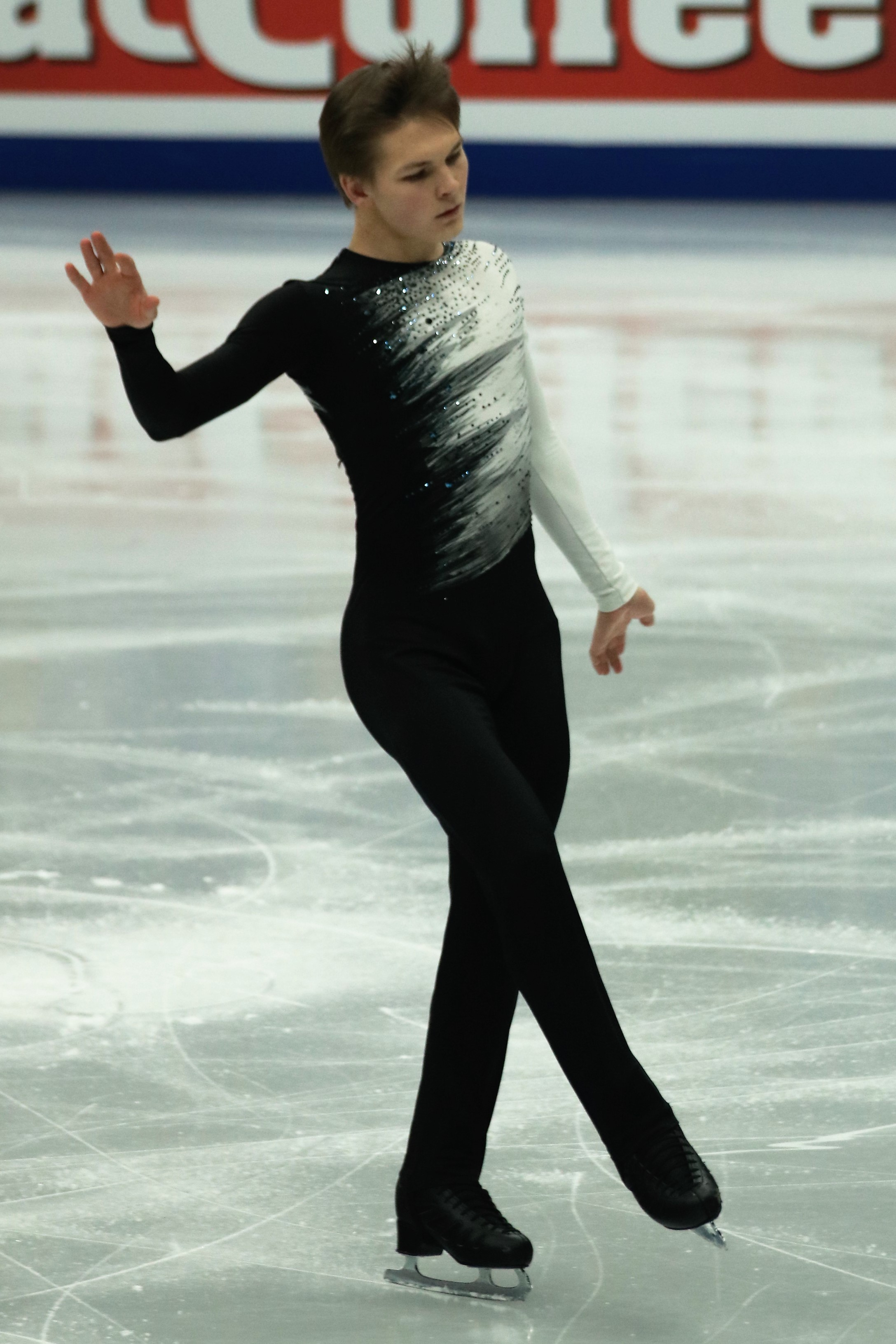
Kolyada at the 2018 European Championships

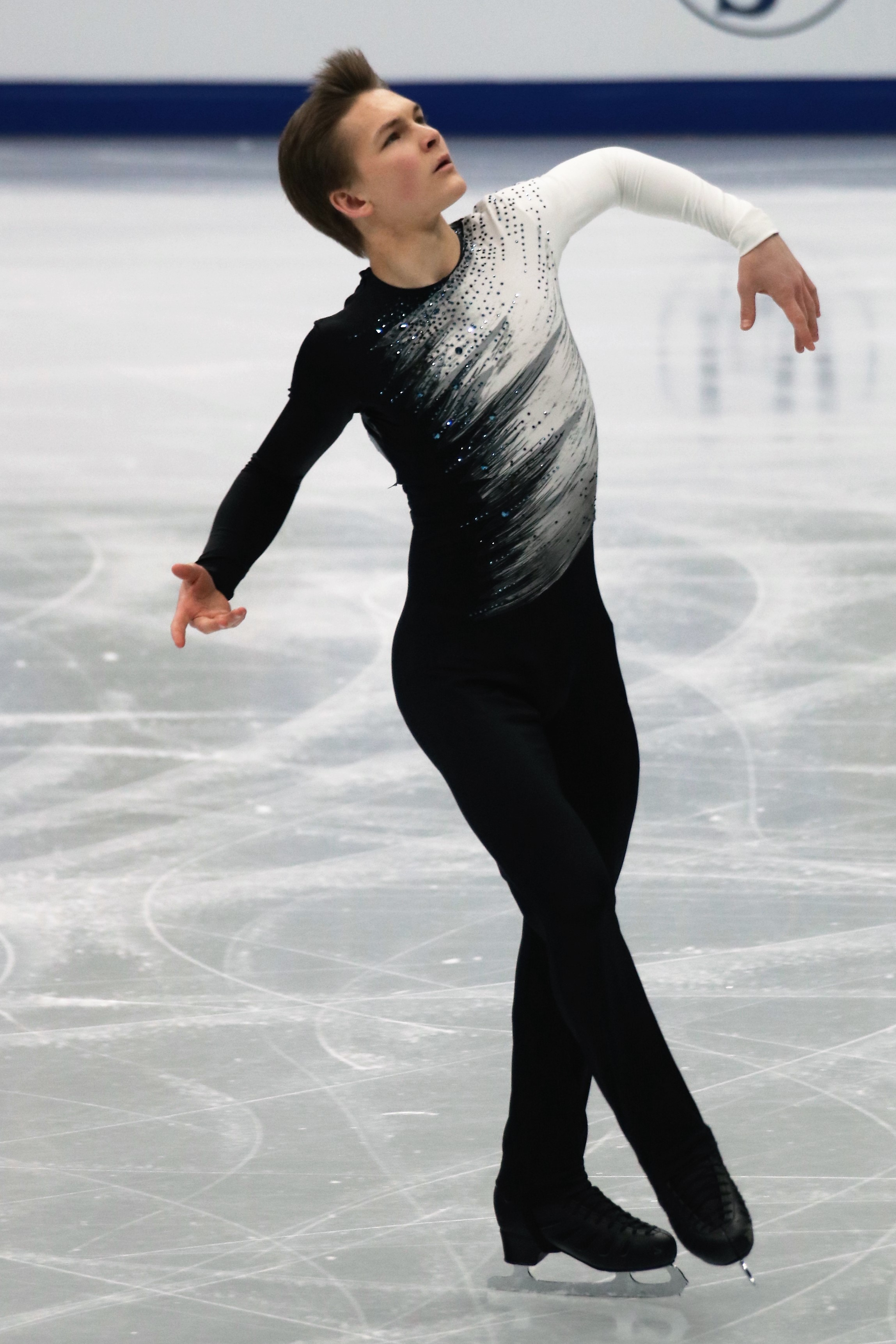
Kolyada at the 2018 European Championships

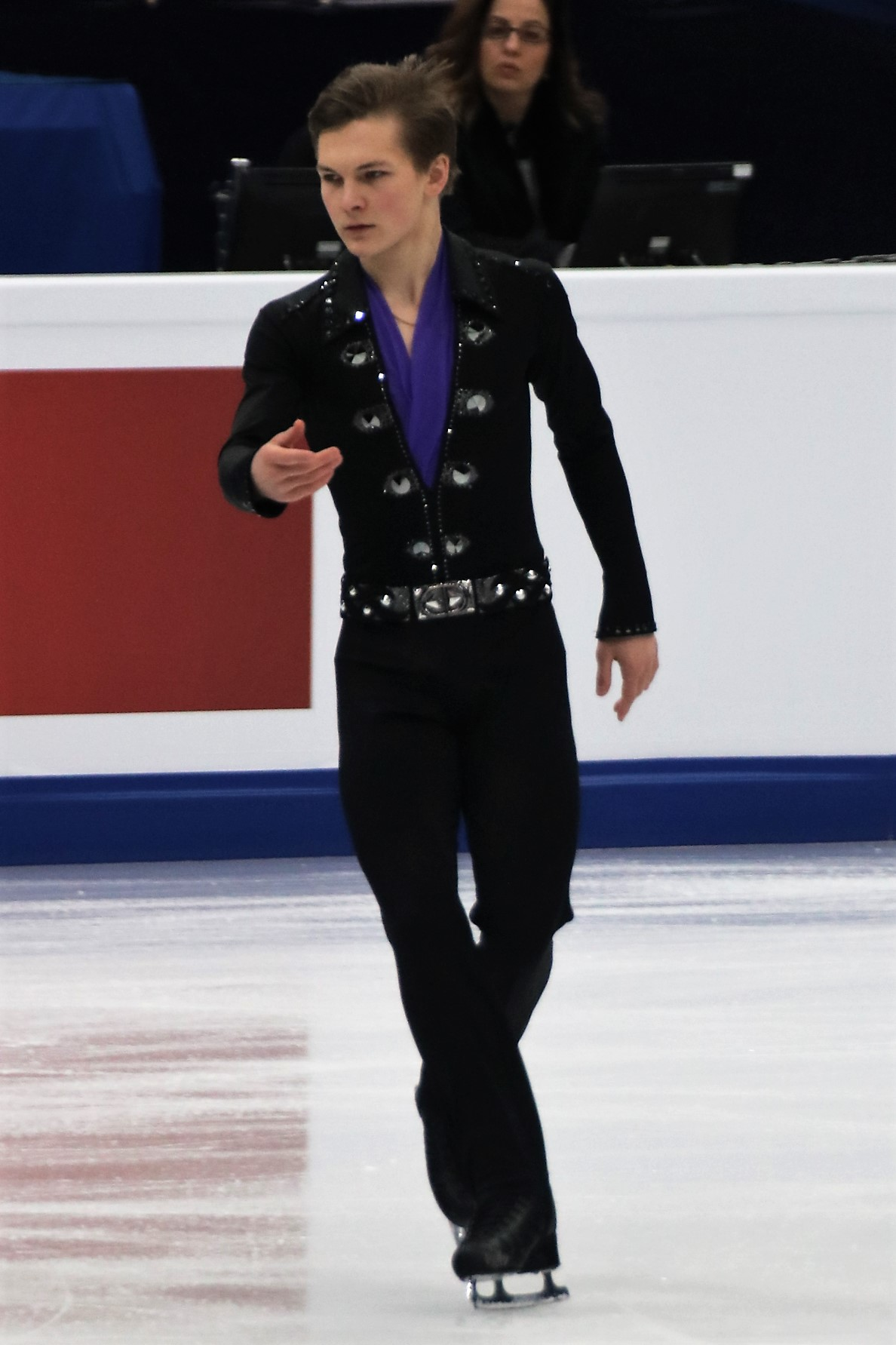
Kolyada at the 2018 European Championships

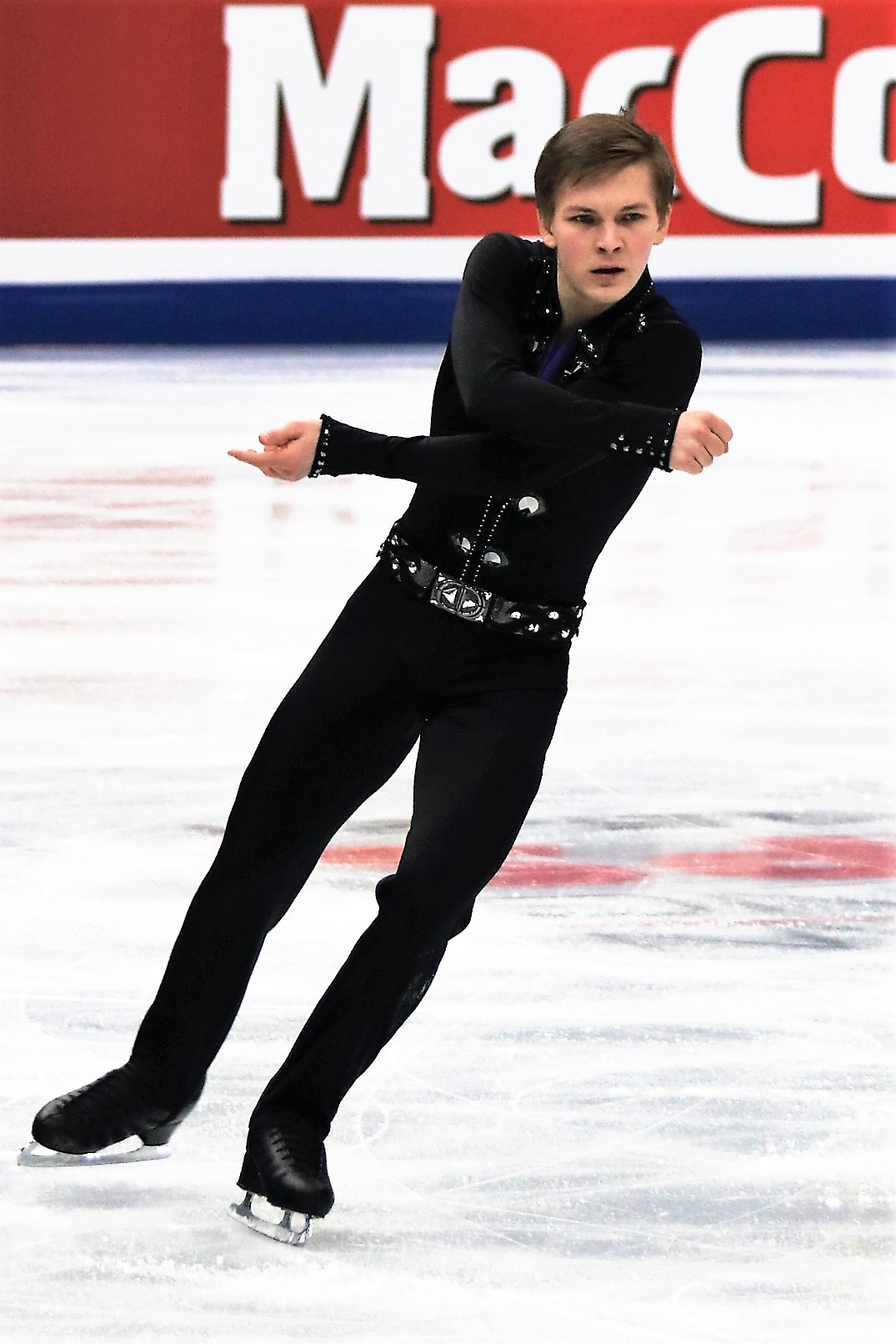
Kolyada at the 2018 European Championships

Season	Short program	Free skating	Exhibition
2022–2023	Pas de deux (from The Nutcracker) by Pyotr Ilyich Tchaikovsky choreo. by Ilia Averbukh	Tango in a Madhouse by Alfred Schnittke choreo. by Ilia Averbukh	
2021–2022	Pas de deux (from The Nutcracker) by Pyotr Ilyich Tchaikovsky choreo. by Ilia Averbukh; Caruso by Lucio Dalla performed by Luciano Pavarotti choreo. by Ilia Averbukh	Nureyev (from The White Crow) by Ilan Eshkeri performed by Lisa Batiashvili choreo. by Ilia Averbukh; Schindler's List / Via Dolorosa by John Williams, and Billy Sprague and Niles Borop choreo. by Nikita Mikhailov performed by Maurice Sklar	
2020–2021	Let's Get Loud by Jennifer Lopez performed by The Baseballs choreo. by Tatiana Prokofieva	Nureyev (from The White Crow) by Ilan Eshkeri performed by Lisa Batiashvili choreo. by Ilia Averbukh	Une vie d'amour by Charles Aznavour
2019–2020	Diga Diga Doo (from Blackbirds of 1928) by Jimmy McHugh performed by Big Bad Voodoo Daddy choreo. by Olga Zotova; Wind of Change by Scorpions choreo. by Olga Zotova	Charlie Chaplin medley by Charlie Chaplin choreo. by Olga Zotova; City Lights; The Kid; Modern Times	Wind of Change by Scorpions choreo. by Olga Zotova
2018–2019	I Belong to You (+Mon cœur s'ouvre à ta voix) by Muse choreo. by Stéphane Lambiel	Carmen Suite by Rodion Shchedrin; Habanera from Carmen Suite No. 2 by Georges Bizet choreo. by Olga Zotova	Nothing Else Matters by Metallica
2017–2018	Piano Concerto No. 23 in A Major by Wolfgang Amadeus Mozart; Tango	Steamroller Blues; Can't Help Falling In Love; Rip It Up by Elvis Presley	Nothing Else Matters by Metallica; Baba Yaga (from Pictures at an Exhibition) by Modest Mussorgsky
2016–2017	Nightingale Tango by Yuri Bogoslovski; John Gray foxtrot by Matvey Blanter	Le rêve de la fiancée (from La fiancée aux yeux de bois) by Jean-Marc Zelwer; À la lune (from Cirque du Soleil's La Nouba)	Baba Yaga (from Pictures at an Exhibition) by Modest Mussorgsky; Hallelujah performed by Axel Rudi Pell
2015–2016	Nightingale Tango; John Gray foxtrot by Matvey Blanter	The Nightmare Before Christmas by Danny Elfman	Fever performed by Elvis Presley
2014–2015	Fever performed by Elvis Presley; A Tap Dancer's Dilemma by Diablo Swing Orchestra	The Nightmare Before Christmas by Danny Elfman	
2013–2014	The Mask by Randy Edelman	Tango Invierno Porteno by Astor Piazzolla	
2012–2013	The Mask by Randy Edelman	Pearl Harbor by Hans Zimmer	
2011–2012	Tango by Gotan Project	Spartacus by Aram Khachaturian	

== Competitive highlights ==
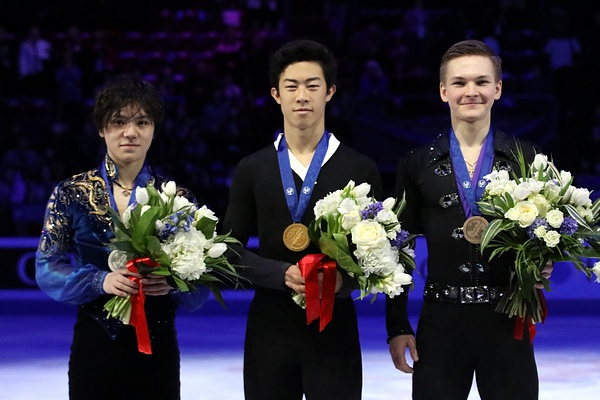
Kolyada (right) with Nathan Chen (center) and Shoma Uno (left) at the 2018 World Championships podium

GP: Grand Prix; CS: Challenger Series; JGP: Junior Grand Prix

International
Event	11–12	12–13	13–14	14–15	15–16	16–17	17–18	18–19	19–20	20–21	21–22
Olympics							8th				WD
Worlds					4th	8th	3rd	6th		5th	
Europeans					5th	3rd	3rd	5th			WD
GP Final							3rd				C
GP Cup of China							1st				C
GP Finland								4th			
GP Italy											2nd
GP NHK Trophy						5th			WD		
GP Rostelecom Cup				WD	5th	4th	3rd	4th		1st	2nd
GP Skate Canada									WD		
CS Finlandia Trophy						4th	4th	1st			2nd
CS Golden Spin								2nd			
CS Ice Challenge					3rd						WD
CS Ondrej Nepela					2nd		1st	1st			
CS Tallinn Trophy							WD				
Challenge Cup										1st	
Dragon Trophy			1st								
Gardena Trophy			3rd	1st							
Ice Star										1st	
Tallink Hotels Cup								1st			
Seibt Memorial					1st						
Volvo Open Cup		2nd									
International: Junior
Junior Worlds		6th									
JGP Australia	4th										
JGP Estonia			2nd								
JGP France		6th									
JGP Slovakia			3rd								
National
Russia		7th	WD		2nd	1st	1st	2nd	WD	1st	2nd
Russia, Junior	6th	1st	5th								
Team events
Olympics							2nd T				
World Team Trophy						2nd T 4th P		WD		1st T 3rd P	
Team Challenge Cup					2nd T 4th P						

== Detailed results ==
=== Senior level ===
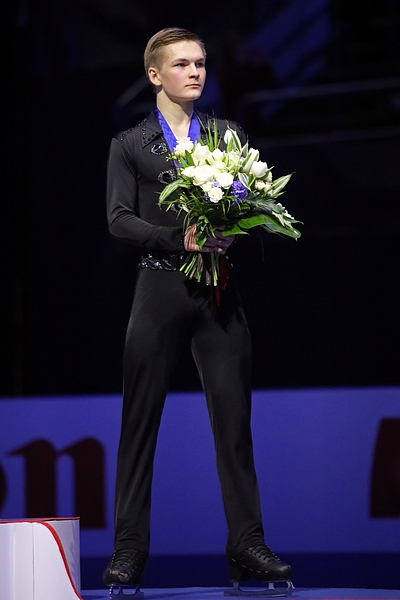
Kolyada at the 2018 World Championships

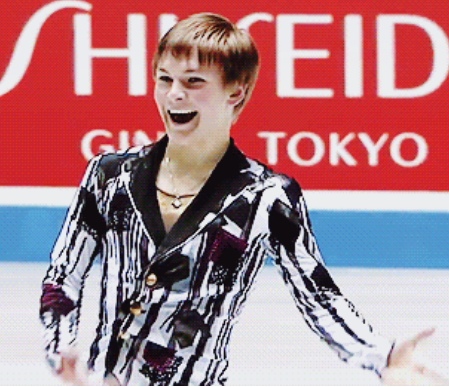
Kolyada at the 2017 World Team Trophy

Small medals for short and free programs awarded only at ISU Championships.

ISU Personal Bests highlighted in bold.

**2021–22 season**
Date	Event	SP	FS	Total
March 25-27, 2022	2022 Channel One Trophy	1; 106.41	1; 200.11	1T/1P; 306.52
December 21–26, 2021	2022 Russian Championships	5; 94.25	1; 189.44	2; 283.70
November 26–28, 2021	2021 Rostelecom Cup	4; 84.48	1; 180.16	2; 264.64
November 5–7, 2021	2021 Gran Premio d'Italia	4; 92.30	2; **181.25**	2; 273.55
October 7–10, 2021	2021 CS Finlandia Trophy	3; 82.75	2; 174.23	2; 256.98
**2020–21 season**
Date	Event	SP	FS	Total
April 15–18, 2021	2021 World Team Trophy	5; 93.42	3; 180.72	1T/3P; 274.14
March 22–28, 2021	2021 World Championships	4; 93.52	5; 178.52	5; 272.04
February 25–28, 2021	2021 Challenge Cup	1; 84.99	1; 185.18	1; 270.17
February 5–7, 2021	2021 Channel One Trophy	1; 105.42	2; 195.02	2T/1P; 300.44
December 23–27, 2020	2021 Russian Championships	1; 102.48	1; 193.67	1; 296.15
November 20–22, 2020	2020 Rostelecom Cup	3; 93.34	1; 188.55	1; 281.89
Oct. 29 – Nov. 1, 2020	2020 Ice Star	1; 102.53	1; 166.82	1; 269.35
**2018–19 season**
Date	Event	SP	FS	Total
March 18–24, 2019	2019 World Championships	10; 84.23	6; 178.21	6; 262.44
February 22–24, 2019	2019 Tallink Hotels Cup	1; 93.63	1; 140.12	1; 233.75
January 21–27, 2019	2019 European Championships	1; **100.49**	11; 140.38	5; 240.87
December 19–23, 2018	2019 Russian Championships	2; 94.70	3; 173.70	2; 268.40
December 5–8, 2018	2018 CS Golden Spin of Zagreb	1; 97.04	2; 156.10	2; 253.14
November 16–18, 2018	2018 Rostelecom Cup	8; 69.10	4; 156.32	4; 225.42
November 2–4, 2018	2018 Grand Prix of Helsinki	6; 81.76	4; 157.03	4; 238.79
October 4–7, 2018	2018 CS Finlandia Trophy	1; 85.20	1; 165.38	1; 250.58
September 19–22, 2018	2018 CS Ondrej Nepela Trophy	1; 96.82	1; 177.55	1; **274.37**
**2017–18 season**
Date	Event	SP	FS	Total
March 19–25, 2018	2018 World Championships	2; 100.08	4; 172.24	3; 272.32
February 14–25, 2018	2018 Winter Olympics	8; 86.69	7; 177.56	8; 264.25
February 9–12, 2018	2018 Winter Olympics (Team event)	8; 74.36	2; 173.57	2^{T}
January 15–21, 2018	2018 European Championships	4; 83.41	3; 175.49	3; 258.90
December 21–24, 2017	2018 Russian Championships	2; 101.62	1; 179.54	1; 281.16
December 7–10, 2017	2017–18 Grand Prix Final	3; 99.22	3; 182.78	3; **282.00**
November 3–5, 2017	2017 Cup of China	1; **103.13**	3; 176.25	1; 279.38
October 20–22, 2017	2017 Rostelecom Cup	4; 85.79	3; **185.27**	3; 271.06
October 6–8, 2017	2017 CS Finlandia Trophy	1; 90.45	5; 158.05	4; 248.50
September 21–23, 2017	2017 CS Ondrej Nepela Trophy	10; 66.65	1; 181.16	1; 247.81
**2016–17 season**
Date	Event	SP	FS	Total
April 20–23, 2017	2017 World Team Trophy	4; 95.37	5; 184.04	2T/4P; 279.41
Mar. 29 – Apr. 2, 2017	2017 World Championships	7; 93.28	9; 164.19	8; 257.47
January 25–29, 2017	2017 European Championships	4; 83.96	3; 166.22	3; 250.18
December 20–26, 2016	2017 Russian Championships	1; 95.33	1; 188.15	1; 283.48
November 25–27, 2016	2016 NHK Trophy	4; 78.18	6; 147.51	5; 225.69
November 4–6, 2016	2016 Rostelecom Cup	3; 90.28	6; 155.02	4; 245.30
October 6–10, 2016	2016 CS Finlandia Trophy	4; 80.20	5; 139.35	4; 219.55
**2015–16 season**
Date	Event	SP	FS	Total
April 22–24, 2016	2016 Team Challenge Cup	6; 70.60	4; 165.48	2^{T}
Mar. 28 – Apr. 3, 2016	2016 World Championships	6; 89.66	5; 178.31	4; 267.97
February 23–27, 2016	2016 Hellmut Seibt Memorial	2; 71.41	1; 155.12	1; 226.53
January 26–31, 2016	2016 European Championships	9; 77.58	3; 159.00	5; 236.58
December 22–27, 2015	2016 Russian Championships	2; 90.55	2; 170.18	2; 260.73
November 20–22, 2015	2015 Rostelecom Cup	5; 79.64	3; 168.33	5; 247.97
Oct. 27 – Nov. 1, 2015	2015 Ice Challenge	3; 74.86	1; 164.91	3; 239.77
October 1–3, 2015	2015 Ondrej Nepela Trophy	1; 84.33	4; 145.26	2; 229.59
**2014–15 season**
Date	Event	SP	FS	Total
March 23–25, 2015	2015 Gardena Spring Trophy	1; 75.44	1; 133.72	1; 209.16

=== Junior level ===
**2013–14 season**
Date	Event	Level	SP	FS	Total
6–9 February 2014	2014 Dragon Trophy	Senior	1; 71.56	1; 143.18	1; 214.74
22–25 January 2014	2014 Russian Junior Championships	Junior	3; 71.34	6; 130.65	5; 201.99
10–12 October 2013	2013 JGP Estonia	Junior	1; 74.90	6; 126.36	2; 201.26
12–14 September 2013	2013 JGP Slovakia	Junior	3; 66.37	2; 123.04	3; 189.41
**2012–13 season**
Date	Event	Level	SP	FS	Total
1–3 March 2013	2013 World Junior Championships	Junior	8; 61.50	5; 128.44	6; 189.94
1–3 February 2013	2013 Russian Junior Championships	Junior	1; 77.63	1; 149.69	1; 227.32
10–13 January 2013	2013 Volvo Open Cup	Senior	2; 65.53	1; 134.13	2; 199.66
25–29 December 2012	2013 Russian Championships	Senior	5; 74.46	9; 134.50	7; 208.96
22–25 August 2012	2012 JGP France	Junior	8; 50.51	5; 108.71	6; 159.22
**2011–12 season**
Date	Event	Level	SP	FS	Total
5–7 February 2012	2012 Russian Junior Championships	Junior	3; 72.82	10; 111.05	6; 183.87
8–10 September 2011	2011 JGP Australia	Junior	6; 53.95	3; 123.60	4; 177.55
