= 2017 ISU World Team Trophy in Figure Skating =

2017 World Team Trophy
- Type: ISU Event
- Date: April 20 – 23
- Season: 2016–17
- Location: Tokyo, Japan
- Host: Japan Skating Federation
- Venue: Yoyogi National Gymnasium
- Previous: 2015 ISU World Team Trophy
- Next: 2019 ISU World Team Trophy

The 2017 ISU World Team Trophy is an international team figure skating competition that was held during the 2016–17 season. Participating countries selected two men's single skaters, two ladies' single skaters, one pair and one ice dancing entry to compete in a team format with points based on the skaters' placement.

== Records ==
The following new ISU best scores were set during this competition:

Event	Component	Skater(s)	Score	Date	Ref
Ladies	Short program	(Russia) Evgenia Medvedeva	80.85	20 April 2017	
Ladies	Free skating	(Russia) Evgenia Medvedeva	160.46	22 April 2017	
Ladies	Total score	(Russia) Evgenia Medvedeva	241.31	22 April 2017	

== Entries ==
Names with an asterisk (*) denote the team captain.

Country	Men	Ladies	Pairs	Ice dancing
Canada	Patrick Chan; Kevin Reynolds	Alaine Chartrand; Gabrielle Daleman	Kirsten Moore-Towers / Michael Marinaro	Kaitlyn Weaver* / Andrew Poje
China	Jin Boyang; Li Tangxu	Li Xiangning; Li Zijun	Peng Cheng / Jin Yang*	Wang Shiyue / Liu Xinyu
France	Kévin Aymoz; Chafik Besseghier	Laurine Lecavelier; Maé-Bérénice Méité	Vanessa James / Morgan Cipres*	Marie-Jade Lauriault / Romain Le Gac
Japan	Yuzuru Hanyu; Shoma Uno	Wakaba Higuchi; Mai Mihara	Sumire Suto / Francis Boudreau-Audet	Kana Muramoto* / Chris Reed
Russia	Mikhail Kolyada; Maxim Kovtun	Evgenia Medvedeva; Elena Radionova	Evgenia Tarasova / Vladimir Morozov	Ekaterina Bobrova* / Dmitri Soloviev
United States	Jason Brown; Nathan Chen	Karen Chen; Ashley Wagner*	Ashley Cain / Timothy LeDuc	Madison Chock / Evan Bates

=== Changes to initial assignments ===
Announced	Country	Discipline	Initial	Replacement	Refs
March 7, 2017	Canada	Pairs	Meagan Duhamel / Eric Radford	Julianne Séguin / Charlie Bilodeau	
March 12, 2017	Canada	Pairs	Julianne Séguin / Charlie Bilodeau	Kirsten Moore-Towers / Michael Marinaro	

== Results ==
=== Team standings ===
Rank	Nation	Men		Ladies		Pairs		Ice dancing		Total team points
Rank	Nation	SP	FS	SP	FS	SP	FS	SD	FD	Total team points
1	Japan	18	23	18	21	7	7	8	7	109
2	Russia	11	11	23	20	9	11	10	10	105
3	United States	19	16	12	11	8	8	12	11	97
4	Canada	8	14	12	11	10	9	11	12	87
5	China	13	7	10	11	11	10	9	9	80
6	France	9	7	3	4	12	12	7	8	62

=== Men ===
Rank	Name	Nation	Total points	SP		Team points	FS		Team points
1	Shoma Uno	Japan	302.02	1	103.53	12	2	198.49	11
2	Nathan Chen	United States	284.52	2	99.28	11	4	185.24	9
3	Yuzuru Hanyu	Japan	284.00	7	83.51	6	1	200.49	12
4	Mikhail Kolyada	Russia	279.41	4	95.37	9	5	184.04	8
5	Patrick Chan	Canada	276.47	6	85.73	7	3	190.74	10
6	Jason Brown	United States	273.67	5	94.32	8	6	179.35	7
7	Jin Boyang	China	272.61	3	97.98	10	7	174.63	6
8	Chafik Besseghier	France	239.39	8	81.93	5	8	157.46	5
9	Maxim Kovtun	Russia	212.91	11	64.62	2	10	148.29	3
10	Kevin Reynolds	Canada	212.29	12	61.88	1	9	150.41	4
11	Kévin Aymoz	France	194.66	9	67.23	4	11	127.43	2
12	Li Tangxu	China	190.56	10	65.24	3	12	125.32	1

=== Ladies ===
Evgenia Medvedeva set a new world record for the short program (80.85 points), for the free skating (160.46 points), and for the combined total (241.31 points).

Rank	Name	Nation	Total points	SP		Team points	FS		Team points
1	Evgenia Medvedeva	Russia	241.31	1	80.85	12	1	160.46	12
2	Mai Mihara	Japan	218.27	3	72.10	10	2	146.17	11
3	Wakaba Higuchi	Japan	216.71	5	71.41	8	3	145.30	10
4	Gabrielle Daleman	Canada	214.15	4	71.74	9	4	142.41	9
5	Elena Radionova	Russia	209.29	2	72.21	11	5	137.08	8
6	Ashley Wagner	United States	204.01	6	70.75	7	6	133.26	7
7	Li Zijun	China	188.06	9	59.76	4	7	128.30	6
8	Li Xiangning	China	179.42	7	63.81	6	8	115.61	5
9	Karen Chen	United States	168.95	8	60.33	5	9	108.62	4
10	Alaine Chartrand	Canada	166.28	10	59.13	3	11	107.15	2
11	Laurine Lecavelier	France	161.58	11	54.15	2	10	107.43	3
12	Maé-Bérénice Méité	France	154.69	12	49.11	1	12	105.58	1

=== Pairs ===
Rank	Name	Nation	Total points	SP		Team points	FS		Team points
1	Vanessa James / Morgan Ciprès	France	222.59	1	75.72	12	1	146.87	12
2	Evgenia Tarasova / Vladimir Morozov	Russia	208.75	4	66.37	9	2	142.38	11
3	Peng Cheng / Jin Yang	China	204.49	2	71.36	11	3	133.13	10
4	Kirsten Moore-Towers / Michael Marinaro	Canada	199.65	3	69.56	10	4	130.09	9
5	Ashley Cain / Timothy LeDuc	United States	163.80	5	59.57	8	5	104.23	8
6	Sumire Suto / Francis Boudreau-Audet	Japan	152.41	6	54.84	7	6	97.57	7

=== Ice dancing ===
Rank	Name	Nation	Total points	SD		Team points	FD		Team points
1	Kaitlyn Weaver / Andrew Poje	Canada	190.56	2	76.73	11	1	113.83	12
2	Madison Chock / Evan Bates	United States	189.01	1	79.05	12	2	109.96	11
3	Ekaterina Bobrova / Dmitri Soloviev	Russia	173.49	3	68.94	10	3	104.55	10
4	Wang Shiyue / Liu Xinyu	China	158.36	4	64.03	9	4	94.33	9
5	Kana Muramoto / Chris Reed	Japan	156.45	5	63.77	8	6	92.68	7
6	Marie-Jade Lauriault / Romain Le Gac	France	154.36	6	61.44	7	5	92.92	8
