= 2016 NHK Trophy =

- Type: Grand Prix
- Date: November 25 – 27
- Season: 2016–17
- Location: Sapporo
- Host: Japan Skating Federation
- Venue: Makomanai Sekisuiheim Ice Arena

Champions
- Men's singles: (Japan) Yuzuru Hanyu
- Ladies' singles: (Russia) Anna Pogorilaya
- Pairs: (Canada) Meagan Duhamel / Eric Radford
- Ice dance: (Canada) Tessa Virtue / Scott Moir
- Previous: 2015 NHK Trophy
- Next: 2017 NHK Trophy
- Previous Grand Prix: 2016 Cup of China
- Next Grand Prix: 2016–17 Grand Prix Final

The 2016 NHK Trophy was the final event of six in the 2016–17 ISU Grand Prix of Figure Skating, a senior-level international invitational competition series. It was held at the Makomanai Sekisuiheim Ice Arena in Sapporo on November 25–27. Medals were awarded in the disciplines of men's singles, ladies' singles, pair skating, and ice dancing. Skaters earned points toward qualifying for the 2016–17 Grand Prix Final.

== Entries ==
The ISU published the preliminary assignments on June 30, 2016.

Country	Men	Ladies	Pairs	Ice dancing
Austria			Miriam Ziegler / Severin Kiefer	
Canada	Elladj Baldé; Nam Nguyen	Alaine Chartrand	Meagan Duhamel / Eric Radford	Tessa Virtue / Scott Moir
China			Peng Cheng / Jin Yang; Wang Xuehan / Wang Lei	
France				Marie-Jade Lauriault / Romain Le Gac; Gabriella Papadakis / Guillaume Cizeron
Germany			Mari Vartmann / Ruben Blommaert	
Israel	Oleksii Bychenko			
Italy				Anna Cappellini / Luca Lanotte
Japan	Yuzuru Hanyu; Ryuju Hino; Keiji Tanaka	Wakaba Higuchi; Yura Matsuda; Satoko Miyahara	Sumire Suto / Francis Boudreau-Audet	Emi Hirai / Marien de la Asuncion; Kana Muramoto / Chris Reed
Kazakhstan		Elizabet Tursynbayeva		
Latvia	Deniss Vasiļjevs			
Poland				Natalia Kaliszek / Maksym Spodyriev
South Korea		Choi Da-bin		
Russia	Mikhail Kolyada	Anna Pogorilaya; Maria Sotskova		Victoria Sinitsina / Nikita Katsalapov
Slovakia		Nicole Rajičová		
United States	Jason Brown; Nathan Chen; Grant Hochstein	Karen Chen; Mirai Nagasu	Tarah Kayne / Daniel O'Shea	Anastasia Cannuscio / Colin McManus; Kaitlin Hawayek / Jean-Luc Baker

=== Changes to initial assignments ===
Date	Discipline	Withdrew	Added	Reason/Other notes	Refs
August 26	Pairs	N/A	(Austria) Miriam Ziegler / Severin Kiefer	Host pick	
September 1 and 13	Ice dancing	(United Kingdom) Penny Coomes / Nicholas Buckland	(United States) Anastasia Cannuscio / Colin McManus	Injury (Coomes)	
September 13 and 20	Men	(Russia) Adian Pitkeev	(Latvia) Deniss Vasiļjevs	Injury	
October 17 and 31	Pairs	(Russia) Ksenia Stolbova / Fedor Klimov	(Germany) Mari Vartmann / Ruben Blommaert		
October 27; November 11	Men	(Japan) Sota Yamamoto	(Japan) Ryuju Hino	Injury	
November 7 and 10	Ladies	(United States) Polina Edmunds	(South Korea) Choi Da-bin		
November 17	Pairs	(Canada) Kirsten Moore-Towers / Michael Marinaro	Not replaced		
November 22	Men	(Italy) Ivan Righini	Not replaced		
November 22	Ladies	(Russia) Alena Leonova	Not replaced		

== Results ==
=== Men ===
Rank	Name	Nation	Total points	SP		FS	
1	Yuzuru Hanyu	Japan	301.47	1	103.89	1	197.58
2	Nathan Chen	United States	268.91	2	87.94	2	180.97
3	Keiji Tanaka	Japan	248.44	3	80.49	3	167.95
4	Oleksii Bychenko	Israel	229.87	7	75.13	4	154.74
5	Mikhail Kolyada	Russia	225.69	4	78.18	6	147.51
6	Deniss Vasiļjevs	Latvia	223.73	10	70.50	5	153.23
7	Jason Brown	United States	218.47	8	74.33	7	144.14
8	Nam Nguyen	Canada	212.43	6	75.33	8	137.10
9	Ryuju Hino	Japan	207.15	9	72.50	9	134.65
10	Elladj Baldé	Canada	195.32	5	76.29	11	119.03
11	Grant Hochstein	United States	191.40	11	68.31	10	123.09

=== Ladies ===
Rank	Name	Nation	Total points	SP		FS	
1	Anna Pogorilaya	Russia	210.86	1	71.56	1	139.30
2	Satoko Miyahara	Japan	198.00	3	64.20	2	133.80
3	Maria Sotskova	Russia	195.88	2	69.96	3	125.92
4	Wakaba Higuchi	Japan	185.39	5	62.58	4	122.81
5	Mirai Nagasu	United States	180.33	4	63.49	8	116.84
6	Karen Chen	United States	178.45	7	58.76	5	119.69
7	Yura Matsuda	Japan	178.26	6	60.98	7	117.28
8	Elizabet Tursynbayeva	Kazakhstan	175.11	9	55.66	6	119.45
9	Choi Da-bin	South Korea	165.63	11	51.06	9	114.57
10	Alaine Chartrand	Canada	160.22	8	58.72	11	101.50
11	Nicole Rajičová	Slovakia	159.70	10	53.43	10	106.27

=== Pairs ===
Rank	Name	Nation	Total points	SP		FS	
1	Meagan Duhamel / Eric Radford	Canada	204.56	2	72.95	1	131.61
2	Peng Cheng / Jin Yang	China	196.87	1	73.33	2	123.54
3	Wang Xuehan / Wang Lei	China	185.32	3	65.66	3	119.66
4	Tarah Kayne / Daniel O'Shea	United States	172.20	5	57.02	4	115.18
5	Mari Vartmann / Ruben Blommaert	Germany	170.70	4	61.23	6	109.47
6	Miriam Ziegler / Severin Kiefer	Austria	161.91	7	52.19	5	109.72
7	Sumire Suto / Francis Boudreau-Audet	Japan	161.85	6	52.65	7	109.20

=== Ice dancing ===
Tessa Virtue and Scott Moir set a new world record for the short dance (79.47 points) and for the combined total (195.84 points).

Rank	Name	Nation	Total points	SD		FD	
1	Tessa Virtue / Scott Moir	Canada	195.84	1	79.47	1	116.37
2	Gabriella Papadakis / Guillaume Cizeron	France	186.66	2	75.60	2	111.06
3	Anna Cappellini / Luca Lanotte	Italy	180.42	3	72.00	3	108.42
4	Kaitlin Hawayek / Jean-Luc Baker	United States	169.75	5	65.41	4	104.34
5	Victoria Sinitsina / Nikita Katsalapov	Russia	169.62	4	68.85	5	100.77
6	Marie-Jade Lauriault / Romain Le Gac	France	149.99	7	58.21	6	91.78
7	Natalia Kaliszek / Maksym Spodyriev	Poland	147.93	6	59.92	7	88.01
8	Anastasia Cannuscio / Colin McManus	United States	139.47	8	52.66	8	86.81
9	Emi Hirai / Marien de la Asuncion	Japan	120.35	9	49.37	9	70.98
WD	Kana Muramoto / Chris Reed	Japan	withdrew	withdrew from competition			
