= Karen Chen =

American figure skater (born 1999)

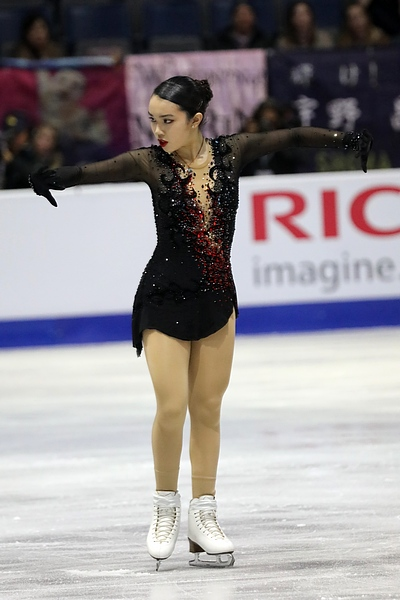
- Chen at the 2017 Skate Canada International

Personal information
- Born: August 16, 1999 (age 27) Fremont, California, U.S.
- Height: 5 ft 1 in (1.55 m)

Figure skating career
- Country: United States
- Discipline: Women's singles
- Coach: Tammy Gambill
- Skating club: Peninsula Figure Skating Club, San Jose
- Began skating: 2005
- Highest WS: 10th (2021–22)

Medal record
Olympic Games
Gold medal – first place	2022 Beijing	Team
U.S. Championships
Gold medal – first place	2017 Kansas City	Singles
Silver medal – second place	2022 Nashville	Singles
Bronze medal – third place	2015 Greensboro	Singles
Bronze medal – third place	2018 San Jose	Singles
Bronze medal – third place	2021 Las Vegas	Singles
World Team Trophy
Silver medal – second place	2021 Osaka	Team
Bronze medal – third place	2017 Tokyo	Team

Karen Chen
- Traditional Chinese: 陳楷雯
- Simplified Chinese: 陈楷雯
Transcriptions
Standard Mandarin
- Hanyu Pinyin: Chén Kǎiwén

Karen Chen (born August 16, 1999) is an American figure skater. She is a 2022 Olympic Games team event gold medalist, two-time CS U.S. Classic bronze medalist (2016, 2017), the 2015 CS Golden Spin of Zagreb bronze medalist, the 2017 U.S. national champion, 2022 U.S. national silver medalist, and a three-time U.S. national bronze medalist (2015, 2018, 2021). She graduated from Cornell University in 2025.

Chen also competed at the 2018 Winter Olympics, placing 11th. She has competed at seven ISU Championships, achieving her best result, fourth, at two World Championships (2017, 2021).

Earlier in her career, she won four medals on the ISU Junior Grand Prix series, including gold at the 2013 JGP Slovakia.

== Personal life ==
Karen Chen was born on August 16, 1999, in Fremont, California, to Hsiu-Hui Tseng and Chih-Hsiu Chen. Her parents moved to the United States from Taiwan. She has a younger brother, Jeffrey, who also competes for the U.S. in ice dance. She was homeschooled via Connections Academy in high school. Chen has expressed interest in majoring in the medical field. She was admitted to Cornell University's School of Human Ecology for the Fall 2019 semester majoring in Human Biology, Health, and Society on a pre-med track. Chen originally did not plan to take any gap years or defer her education while preparing for the 2022 Winter Olympics, but decided to take a two-year leave of absence after the onset of the COVID-19 pandemic. She graduated in May 2025 and plans to work in physical therapy to help fellow figure skaters. In July 2026, she announced her enrollment in the Doctor of Physical Therapy program at Tufts University.

Chen's mentor is 1992 Olympic Champion Kristi Yamaguchi, who shares a hometown with her. Chen published a memoir titled Finding the Edge: My Life on the Ice in November 2017, in which she revealed that she suffers from spondylolisthesis. Chen enjoys painting and is a fan of the Japanese character Totoro. On 2019 International Women's Day, she was chosen to be one of eight POWERGIRLs that serve as brand ambassadors for social fitness blogger Cassey Ho's activewear company, POPFLEX Active.

In September 2024, she announced her engagement to boyfriend, Len van Deurzen. They married on May 14, 2026.

== Career ==
=== Early career ===
Chen began learning to skate in 2005. She won gold on the national intermediate level in 2011 and then gold competing as a novice in 2012. The following season, she competed on the junior level at the 2013 U.S. Championships, placing fourth. She made her international debut at the 2013 Gardena Spring Trophy, where she won gold on the novice level.

=== 2013–14 season: Junior international debut ===
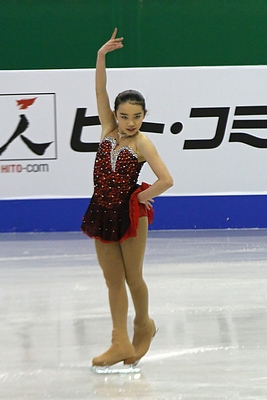
Chen at the 2014 World Junior Championships

In the 2013–14 season, Chen received her first ISU Junior Grand Prix (JGP) assignments. She won bronze in Riga, Latvia, followed by gold in Košice, Slovakia, and qualified for the JGP Final. While practicing a triple Lutz, she sustained a type three tibia fracture in her right ankle. The injury led her to withdraw from the JGP Final. Chen spent four weeks on crutches and resumed training in mid-December. She withdrew from the junior event at the 2014 U.S. Championships after placing fifth in the short program. At the 2014 World Junior Championships in Sofia, Bulgaria, she placed sixth in the short program, ninth in the free skate, and ninth overall.

=== 2014–15 season: First senior national medal ===
In the 2014–15 JGP series, Chen won bronze at Czech Skate and silver at the Croatia Cup, respectively. She was awarded the bronze medal in her senior national debut at the 2015 U.S. Championships, behind Ashley Wagner and Gracie Gold. Chen was not old enough to compete at the 2015 World Figure Skating Championships and was instead assigned to the 2015 World Junior Figure Skating Championships, where she placed eighth.

=== 2015–16 season: Senior international debut ===
Ahead of the season, Chen tried 14 pairs of skate boots. In September 2015, she finished fourth at the 2015 U.S. International Classic, an ISU Challenger Series (CS) event and her first senior international. Making her Grand Prix debut, she placed fifth at both the 2015 Skate America and 2015 Cup of China. She won bronze at her second CS assignment, the 2015 Golden Spin of Zagreb in December and finished 8th at the 2016 U.S. Championships in January.

=== 2016–17 season: Senior national champion ===
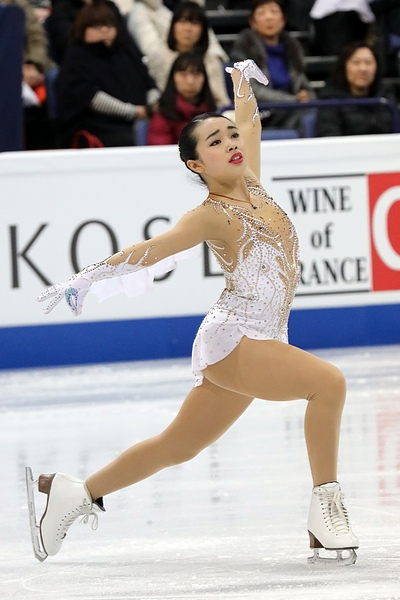
Chen at the 2017 World Championships

Chen began her season at the 2016 CS U.S. Classic, placing third behind Japan's Satoko Miyahara and the United States' Mariah Bell.

On the Grand Prix series, Chen achieved a seventh-place finish at 2016 Cup of China and a sixth-place finish at 2016 NHK Trophy.

Chen won the gold medal at the 2017 U.S. Championships after placing first in both the short program and free skate. She set a new U.S. record with her short program score of 72.82.

At the 2017 Four Continents Championships, Chen skated to a twelfth-place finish.

Chen rebounded at the 2017 World Figure Skating Championships, placing fifth in the short program with a score of 69.98. She then placed sixth in the free program with a score of 129.31. With a combined score of 199.29, Chen skated to a fourth-place finish overall in her first appearance at the World Championships. Her placement, combined with a seventh-place finish from teammate Ashley Wagner, qualified Team USA three spots for the 2018 Olympics and 2018 World Figure Skating Championships.

=== 2017–18 season: Pyeongchang Olympics ===
Chen began her season at the CS's U.S. International Figure Skating Classic, placing 3rd overall for the second year in a row. Before beginning competition in her Grand Prix series, Chen also performed a free skate at the Japan Open helping Team North America earn the bronze medal with a 6th-place finish.

Two weeks before her first Grand Prix event, Chen abandoned her "Carmen"-themed free skate program and replaced it with a program she choreographed herself, including music from the 1978 film Slow Dancing in the Big City. With her new program, Chen placed 7th overall at the 2017 Skate Canada International.

Chen competed in her second Grand Prix event at 2017 Skate America and placed ninth in the short program after failing to land a triple loop. She improved to eighth place after the free skating, from which teammate Ashley Wagner withdrew due to an ankle infection.

At the 2018 U.S. Championships, Chen placed third in the short program and fourth in the free skate to win the overall bronze medal. As a result, Chen was selected to represent the US at the 2018 Winter Olympic Games in Pyeongchang, South Korea and the 2018 World Championships in Milan, Italy. She placed eleventh in the Olympics and withdrew from Worlds; she was replaced by second alternate Mariah Bell after first alternate Ashley Wagner declined the invitation.

=== 2018–19 season: Injury and withdrawals ===
Chen trained with her younger brother, ice dancer Jeffrey Chen, in Canton, Michigan, during the two-month-long 2018 Stars on Ice tour. She later relocated with longtime coach Tammy Gambill from Riverside, California, to Gambill's new training base at the United States Olympic Training Center in Colorado Springs, Colorado, over the summer. Chen will also work with coaches Christy Krall and Tom Zakrajsek in addition to Gambill.

Chen withdrew from early season events and her Grand Prix assignments, 2018 Grand Prix of Helsinki and 2018 Rostelecom Cup, following an injury during the off-season. She returned to competition at the 2018 CS Tallinn Trophy, where she finished ninth in the short program. Chen withdrew from the free skate due to injury. She announced her subsequent withdrawal from the 2019 U.S. Championships to focus on her health in early January. Chen later revealed that she had been suffering from a stress fracture in her right foot. In 2019, she also announced that she would be attending Cornell University in the fall, as well as returning to competition during the 2019–20 season.

=== 2019–20 season: Comeback year ===
Chen returned to competition after sitting out the 2018–19 season due to injury while simultaneously beginning her freshman year at Cornell University. She opened her season at the 2019 Philadelphia Summer International, where she won the silver medal behind training teammate You Young of South Korea. Chen then placed fourth at the 2019 CS Autumn Classic International in Oakville, Ontario, behind Rika Kihira, Evgenia Medvedeva, and Lim Eun-soo.

At her first Grand Prix event of the season and first major international event since the 2018 Olympic Games, 2019 Skate America, Chen placed sixth in the short program and tenth in the free skate to finish eighth overall while battling a cold and sleep deprivation. She told media that despite her struggles balancing school and skating, “I do really enjoy everything and I think I made the right decision.” At the 2019 NHK Trophy, Chen placed third in the short program ahead of reigning Olympic champion Alina Zagitova of Russia but struggled in the free skate to finish ninth overall.

Before the 2020 U.S. Championships, Chen worked with choreographer Ilona Melnichenko to bring back the Slow Dancing in the Big City free skating program that she previously debuted and competed once at 2017 Skate Canada. She placed fifth in the short program and fourth in the free skating to finish fourth at the U.S. Championships, behind Alysa Liu, Mariah Bell, and Bradie Tennell, despite not completing a triple-triple combination in either program. Her pewter is the fourth medal that she has won at the senior level. As a result of her placement and Liu being age-ineligible for senior competition, Chen was named to the U.S. team for the 2020 Four Continents Championships. She was also named as first alternate for the 2020 World Championships.

Chen earned personal bests in all three segments to achieve a seventh-place finish at 2020 Four Continents Championships, her highest ever after previously placing 12th twice. She told the media after her free skate, "I am proud of myself for the last competition of the season. Ending on a high note is exactly what I wanted to do."

=== 2020–21 season: Return to Worlds ===
Chen did not enroll at Cornell for her sophomore year, explaining that classes meeting only virtually meant "it wasn’t worth paying full tuition and not having the whole college experience," and instead returned to training full-time in Colorado Springs. Due to the COVID-19 pandemic, the ISU opted to make assignments for the Grand Prix based on training location to minimize international travel; Chen was correspondingly assigned to compete at 2020 Skate America. She placed fourth in the short program, underrotating the triple toe loop in her jump combination. She was second in the free skate but remained in fourth place overall. Shortly after that, she competed in the 2020 Las Vegas Invitational, a domestic team event, and placed fourth among the ladies to help Team Johnny finish second behind Team Tara.

At the 2021 U.S. Championships, Chen was fourth after the short program due to several under rotations. She placed third in the free skate with only one major mistake on her triple loop. As a result, she earned the bronze medal, her third bronze at the U.S. Championships, and her fifth medal overall. U.S. Figure Skating named gold medalist Bradie Tennell and Chen to the 2021 World Championships team, bypassing silver medalist Amber Glenn for Chen.

In March at the 2021 World Championships, Chen skated two solid programs and placed fourth. She was fourth in the short program and sixth in the free skate. Her placement, combined with Tennell's ninth-place finish, earned the United States three spots for the 2022 World Championships, as well as the opportunity to secure three spots for ladies' singles at the 2022 Winter Olympics via the Olympic qualifying event. Chen's role in saving the third American ladies' spot paralleled her performance at the 2017 World Championships, where she also placed fourth to help secure three spots for the 2018 Winter Olympics.

Chen then competed at the 2021 World Team Trophy, where she finished sixth in both segments to help Team USA win the silver medal.

=== 2021–22 season: Beijing Olympics ===
Chen began the season at the 2021 CS Autumn Classic International, where she unexpectedly finished off the podium in fourth place, behind Cypriot Marilena Kitromilis and South Koreans You Young and Ji Seo-yeon. In light of the jump errors in both programs, she vowed to "continue to work on my consistency." At her second Challenger event of the season, the 2021 CS Finlandia Trophy, Chen placed sixth.

Assigned to begin the Grand Prix at the 2021 Skate Canada International, Chen was sixth in the short program. She was tenth in the free skate after falling twice and having several jumps called underrotated, and she dropped to tenth place overall. She said afterward, "practices have been solid, so it's been tough to leave Vancouver with a program like that." At her second Grand Prix event, the 2021 Internationaux de France, she placed fifth overall after ranking fifth in both the short program and the free skate. She reiterated afterward that she was working on translating her improved practices to competition.

Entering the 2022 U.S. Championships hoping to make her second Olympic team, Chen placed second in the short program, narrowly behind Mariah Bell but a few points clear of third-place Alysa Liu, who withdrew before the free skate due to a positive COVID-19 test. Chen was second in the free skate as well despite four underrotated jumps and took the silver medal, the only senior podium placement she had not previously occupied. The following day she was named to the American Olympic team. Chen is the first U.S. women's singles skater since Sasha Cohen in 2002 and 2006 to qualify for back-to-back Olympic teams.

Upon arrival at the 2022 Winter Olympics, Chen was chosen as the American entry for the women's segments of the Olympic team event. With the United States narrowly in the lead after the first three short program segments, Chen skated her short program under significant pressure but faltered, underrotating the second half of her jump combination and falling on an underrotated triple loop. She ranked fifth, four ordinals below Russian skater Kamila Valieva, as a result of which the United States dropped behind the ROC team to take the silver medal. This was her first Olympic medal. However following a positive doping test of Russia's gold medalist Kamila Valieva, the team members were not awarded their medals, pending an investigation. In January 2024, the Court of Arbitration for Sport disqualified Valieva, and the gold medal is projected to be awarded to the U.S. team. Speaking afterward about skating under pressure, Chen remarked "at the end of the day, it's coming from myself. I want to skate well for my team, for myself, my coach, my family, for all these people." However, she said she was pleased that she had recovered well from the fall. She competed again in the free skating portion of the team event, earning 131.52 points for a fourth-place finish, and winning the gold medal with the U.S. team. In the short program of the women's event, Chen made the same error she did in the team event short program, falling on her triple loop attempt, placing thirteenth in the segment. Seventeenth in the free skate with multiple jump errors, she dropped to sixteenth overall.

At the 2022 World Championships, Chen placed eighth in the short program after singling her triple loop attempt. Eighth in the free skate, Chen also came eighth overall.

=== Post-competitive career ===
Following the 2021–22 figure skating season, Chen decided to focus on her studies at Cornell University. In fall 2022, she began competing at the collegiate level in the solo dance discipline while training at the Cornell Figure Skating Club. Regarding this, Chen stated, "Solo dance is just much more flexible. I’m not really worried about if the judges like my music or if my coach likes it. Similar to what I would do for shows, I just pick music that I like and then go from there. So it gives me a chance to be creative."

During the 2024 Paris Olympics, a medal ceremony was held for Chen and her teammates from the 2022 Olympic Figure Skating Team Event, where they were awarded their Olympic gold medals.

== Programs ==
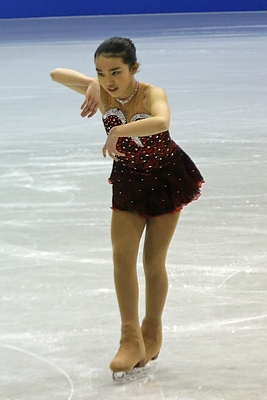
Chen at the 2014 World Junior Championships

Season	Short program	Free skating	Exhibition
2021–2022	La califfa (from La califfa) by Ennio Morricone and Maxime Rodriguez choreo. by Drew Meekins; Requiem for a Dream by Clint Mansell choreo. by Drew Meekins	Butterfly Lovers' Violin Concerto performed by Takako Nishizaki choreo. by Pasquale Camerlengo, Karen Chen	On Golden Pond by Dave Grusin choreo. by Karen Chen
2020–2021	Rise by Katy Perry choreo. by Drew Meekins	Butterfly Lovers' Violin Concerto performed by Takako Nishizaki choreo. by Pasquale Camerlengo, Karen Chen	Never Enough (from The Greatest Showman) by Pasek and Paul performed by Loren Allred; Believe (from The Polar Express) by Glen Ballard, Alan Silvestri performed by Josh Groban choreo. by Karen Chen
2019–2020	You Say by Lauren Daigle choreo. by Karen Chen, Ilona Melnichenko	The Ovation (from Slow Dancing in the Big City) by Bill Conti choreo. by Karen Chen, Ilona Melnichenko; Illumination by Secret Garden choreo. by Ilona Melnichenko	Addicted to You by Avicii
2018–2019	Fire Dance (from Illumination) by Jennifer Thomas choreo. by Massimo Scali; Malagueña by Ernesto Lecuona; Asturias by Isaac Albéniz	Trio élégiaque No.3 by Sergei Rachmaninoff; Illumination by Secret Garden choreo. by Rohene Ward, Marina Zoueva	Fire Dance (from Illumination) by Jennifer Thomas choreo. by Massimo Scali; Never Enough (from The Greatest Showman) by Pasek and Paul performed by Loren Allred
2017–2018	On Golden Pond by Dave Grusin choreo. by Karen Chen; El Tango de Roxanne (from Moulin Rouge!) by Sting, Mariano Mores performed by José Feliciano choreo. by Mark Pillay	Jalousie 'Tango Tzigane' by Jacob Gade choreo. by Karen Chen; Slow Dancing in the Big City by Bill Conti choreo. by Karen Chen; Carmen Suite by Georges Bizet arranged by Rodion Shchedrin choreo. by Mark Pillay	Blow Your Mind (Mwah) by Dua Lipa; Rise by Katy Perry choreo. by Misha Ge; Never Enough (from The Greatest Showman) by Pasek and Paul performed by Loren Allred; El Tango de Roxanne (from Moulin Rouge!) by Sting, Mariano Mores performed by José Feliciano choreo. by Mark Pillay; Lovers (Flower Garden) (from House of Flying Daggers) by Shigeru Umebayashi choreo. by Karen Chen
2016–2017	On Golden Pond by Dave Grusin choreo. by Karen Chen	Jalousie 'Tango Tzigane' by Jacob Gade choreo. by Karen Chen	Rise by Katy Perry choreo. by Misha Ge; Butterfly Lovers' Violin Concerto performed by Takako Nishizaki choreo. by Karen Chen; Lovers (Flower Garden) (from House of Flying Daggers) by Shigeru Umebayashi choreo. by Karen Chen
2015–2016	Violin Fantasy on Puccini's Turandot by Vanessa-Mae choreo. by Justin Dillon	Les Misérables by Claude-Michel Schönberg choreo. by Cindy Stuart	Butterfly Lovers' Violin Concerto by Takako Nishizaki choreo. by Karen Chen; Because We Believe by Andrea Bocelli
2014–2015	Requiem for a Tower performed by Escala; Requiem for a Dream (from Illumination) arranged and performed by Jennifer Thomas; Requiem for a Dream by Clint Mansell choreo. by Justin Dillon, Cindy Stuart	The Godfather Suite by Nino Rota, Drew Tretick choreo. by Justin Dillon, Cindy Stuart	Heart of Palm by Ding Dang; Because We Believe by Andrea Bocelli
2013–2014	Esperanza by Maxime Rodriguez choreo. by Cindy Stuart	Miss Saigon by Claude-Michel Schönberg choreo. by Mark Pillay	
2012–2013	House of Flying Daggers by Shigeru Umebayashi	Fantasy for Violin and Orchestra by Joshua Bell	
2011–2012	The Chairman's Waltz (from Memoirs of a Geisha) by John Williams	The Godfather Suite by Nino Rota, Drew Tretick choreo. by Justin Dillon, Cindy Stuart	Butterfly Dance
2010–11	On Golden Pond by Dave Grusin	My Sweet and Tender Beast by Eugen Doga	

== Competitive highlights ==
- GP – Event of the ISU Grand Prix Series
- JGP – Event of the ISU Junior Grand Prix Series
- CS – Event of the ISU Challenger Series
- WD – Withdrew from competition
- Medals at team events are awarded for the team results only. Individual placements at team events are listed in parentheses.

Competition placements at senior level
Season	2014–15	2015–16	2016–17	2017–18	2018–19	2019–20	2020–21	2021–22
Winter Olympics				11th				15th
Winter Olympics (Team event)								1st
World Championships			4th				4th	8th
Four Continents Championships		12th	12th			7th		
U.S. Championships	3rd	8th	1st	3rd		4th	3rd	2nd
World Team Trophy			3rd (9th)				2nd (6th)	
GP Cup of China		5th	7th					
GP France								5th
GP NHK Trophy			6th			9th		
GP Skate America		5th		8th		8th	4th	
GP Skate Canada				7th				10th
CS Autumn Classic						4th		4th
CS Finlandia Trophy								6th
CS Golden Spin of Zagreb		3rd	7th					
CS Tallinn Trophy					WD			
CS U.S. Classic		4th	3rd	3rd				
Japan Open				3rd (6th)				
Philadelphia Summer				WD		2nd		

Competition placements at junior level
Season	2012–13	2013–14	2014–15
World Junior Championships		9th	8th
U.S. Championships	4th	WD	
JGP Croatia			2nd
JGP Czech Republic			3rd
JGP Latvia		3rd	
JGP Slovakia		1st	

== Detailed results ==
ISU personal best scores in the +5/-5 GOE System
Segment	Type	Score	Event
Total	TSS	208.63	2021 World Championships
Short program	TSS	74.40	2021 World Championships
Short program	TES	40.88	2021 World Championships
Short program	PCS	34.63	2021 CS Finlandia Trophy
Free skating	TSS	134.99	2021 CS Finlandia Trophy
Free skating	TES	67.99	2020 Four Continents Championships
Free skating	PCS	69.62	2021 CS Finlandia Trophy

ISU personal best scores in the +3/-3 GOE System
Segment	Type	Score	Event
Total	TSS	199.29	2017 World Championships
Short program	TSS	69.98	2017 World Championships
Short program	TES	38.35	2017 World Championships
Short program	PCS	32.37	2018 Winter Olympics
Free skating	TSS	129.31	2017 World Championships
Free skating	TES	65.98	2017 World Championships
Free skating	PCS	64.33	2017 World Championships

- At national events in the United States, pewter medals are awarded for fourth place.
- Medals at team events are awarded for the team results only. Individual placements at team events are listed in parentheses.

=== Senior level ===
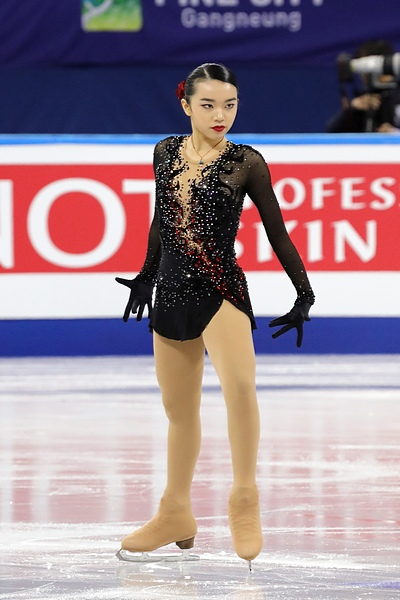
Chen at the 2017 Four Continents Championships

Results in the 2014–15 season
Date	Event	SP		FS		Total	
Date	Event	P	Score	P	Score	P	Score
Jan 18–25, 2015	(United States) 2015 U.S. Championships	6	64.66	3	135.13	3	199.79

Results in the 2015–16 season
Date	Event	SP		FS		Total	
Date	Event	P	Score	P	Score	P	Score
Sep 16–20, 2015	(United States) 2015 CS U.S. International Classic	3	60.94	5	98.24	4	159.18
Oct 23–25, 2015	(United States) 2015 Skate America	4	62.28	6	110.26	5	172.54
Nov 5–8, 2015	2015 Cup of China	7	58.30	5	117.63	5	175.93
Dec 3–5, 2015	(Croatia) 2015 CS Golden Spin of Zagreb	4	56.82	3	118.53	3	175.35
Jan 16–24, 2016	(United States) 2016 U.S. Championships	12	54.86	8	113.89	8	168.75
Feb 16–21, 2016	(Taiwan) 2016 Four Continents Championships	12	53.55	10	107.97	12	161.52

Results in the 2016–17 season
Date	Event	SP		FS		Total	
Date	Event	P	Score	P	Score	P	Score
Sep 14–18, 2016	(United States) 2016 CS U.S. International Classic	6	51.50	3	110.58	3	162.08
Nov 18–20, 2016	2016 Cup of China	9	58.28	5	121.11	7	179.39
Nov 25–27, 2016	(Japan) 2016 NHK Trophy	7	58.76	5	119.69	6	178.45
Dec 8–11, 2016	(Croatia) 2016 CS Golden Spin of Zagreb	6	54.60	7	101.03	7	155.63
Jan 14–22, 2017	(United States) 2017 U.S. Championships	1	72.82	1	141.40	1	214.22
Feb 15–19, 2017	(South Korea) 2017 Four Continents Championships	12	55.60	10	111.22	12	166.82
Mar 29 – Apr 2, 2017	(Finland) 2017 World Championships	5	69.98	6	129.31	4	199.29
Apr 20–23, 2017	(Japan) 2017 World Team Trophy	8	60.33	9	108.62	3 (9)	168.95

Results in the 2017–18 season
Date	Event	SP		FS		Total	
Date	Event	P	Score	P	Score	P	Score
Aug 4–6, 2017	(United States) 2017 Philadelphia Summer International	4	62.20	–	–	–	WD
Sep 13–17, 2017	(United States) 2017 CS U.S. International Classic	2	66.18	3	116.14	3	182.32
Oct 7, 2017	2017 Japan Open	–	–	6	116.32	3	–
Oct 26–28, 2017	2017 Skate Canada International	5	61.77	7	108.63	7	170.40
Nov 24–26, 2017	(United States) 2017 Skate America	9	59.53	6	123.27	8	182.80
Jan 3–5, 2018	(United States) 2018 U.S. Championships	3	69.48	4	129.11	3	198.59
Feb 21–23, 2018	(South Korea) 2018 Winter Olympics	10	65.90	11	119.75	11	185.65

Results in the 2018–19 season
Date	Event	SP		FS		Total	
Date	Event	P	Score	P	Score	P	Score
Nov 26 – Dec 2, 2018	(Estonia) 2018 CS Tallinn Trophy	9	52.93	–	–	–	WD

Results in the 2019–20 season
Date	Event	SP		FS		Total	
Date	Event	P	Score	P	Score	P	Score
Jul 31 – Aug 3, 2019	(United States) 2019 Philadelphia Summer International	1	65.63	2	117.36	2	182.99
Sep 12–14, 2019	(Canada) 2019 CS Autumn Classic International	3	60.89	4	112.77	4	173.66
Oct 18–20, 2019	(United States) 2019 Skate America	6	66.03	10	99.64	8	165.67
Nov 22–24, 2019	(Japan) 2019 NHK Trophy	3	67.21	11	98.49	9	165.70
Jan 20–26, 2020	(United States) 2020 U.S. Championships	5	70.41	4	123.24	4	193.65
Feb 4–9, 2020	(South Korea) 2020 Four Continents Championships	8	67.28	6	133.78	7	201.06

Results in the 2020–21 season
Date	Event	SP		FS		Total	
Date	Event	P	Score	P	Score	P	Score
Oct 23–24, 2020	(United States) 2020 Skate America	4	68.13	2	136.77	4	204.90
Jan 11–21, 2021	(United States) 2021 U.S. Championships	4	70.99	3	143.99	3	214.98
Mar 22–28, 2021	(Sweden) 2021 World Championships	4	74.40	6	134.23	4	208.63
Apr 15–18, 2021	(Japan) 2021 World Team Trophy	6	62.48	6	127.24	2 (6)	189.72

Results in the 2021–22 season
Date	Event	SP		FS		Total	
Date	Event	P	Score	P	Score	P	Score
Sep 16–18, 2021	(Canada) 2021 CS Autumn Classic International	5	58.01	3	114.99	4	173.00
Oct 7–10, 2021	(Finland) 2021 CS Finlandia Trophy	6	67.50	6	134.99	6	202.49
Oct 29–31, 2021	2021 Skate Canada International	6	68.74	10	114.67	10	183.41
Nov 19–21, 2021	2021 Internationaux de France	5	64.67	5	129.33	5	194.00
Jan 3–9, 2022	(United States) 2022 U.S. Championships	2	74.55	3	139.30	2	213.85
Feb 4–7, 2022	(China) 2022 Winter Olympics (Team event)	5	65.20	4	131.52	1	–
Feb 15–17, 2022	(China) 2022 Winter Olympics	13	64.11	17	115.82	16	179.93
Mar 21–27, 2022	(France) 2022 World Championships	8	66.16	8	126.35	8	192.51

=== Junior level ===
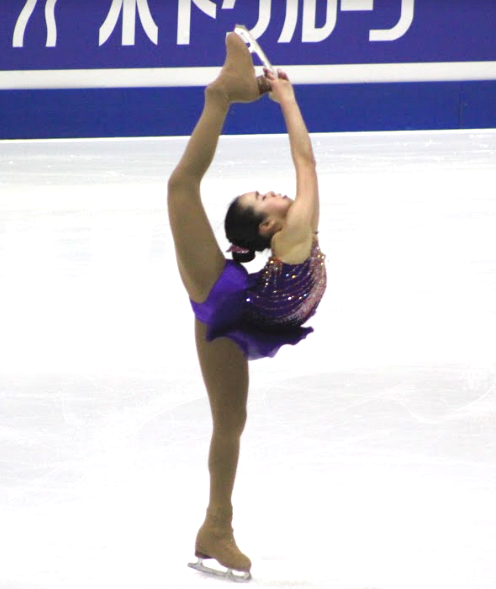
Chen at the 2015 World Junior Championships

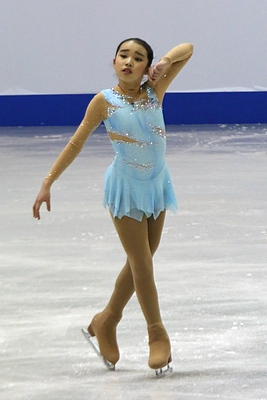
Chen at the 2014 World Junior Championships

Results in the 2012–13 season
Date	Event	SP		FS		Total	
Date	Event	P	Score	P	Score	P	Score
Jan 20–27, 2013	(United States) 2013 U.S. Championships (Junior)	3	54.34	4	90.22	4	144.56

Results in the 2013–14 season
Date	Event	SP		FS		Total	
Date	Event	P	Score	P	Score	P	Score
Aug 29–31, 2013	2013 JGP Latvia	2	58.21	4	96.05	3	154.26
Sep 12–15, 2013	2013 JGP Slovakia	1	64.46	2	114.62	1	179.08
Jan 5–12, 2014	(United States) 2014 U.S. Championships (Junior)	5	51.78	–	–	–	WD
Mar 10–16, 2014	(Bulgaria) 2014 World Junior Championships	6	56.09	9	99.74	9	155.83

Results in the 2014–15 season
Date	Event	SP		FS		Total	
Date	Event	P	Score	P	Score	P	Score
Sep 3–7, 2014	2014 JGP Czech Republic	1	60.88	4	100.27	3	160.95
Oct 8–12, 2014	2014 JGP Croatia	1	62.71	3	106.70	2	169.41
Mar 2–8, 2015	(Estonia) 2015 World Junior Championships	12	51.64	8	105.66	8	157.30
