= Francis Boudreau-Audet =

Canadian figure skater

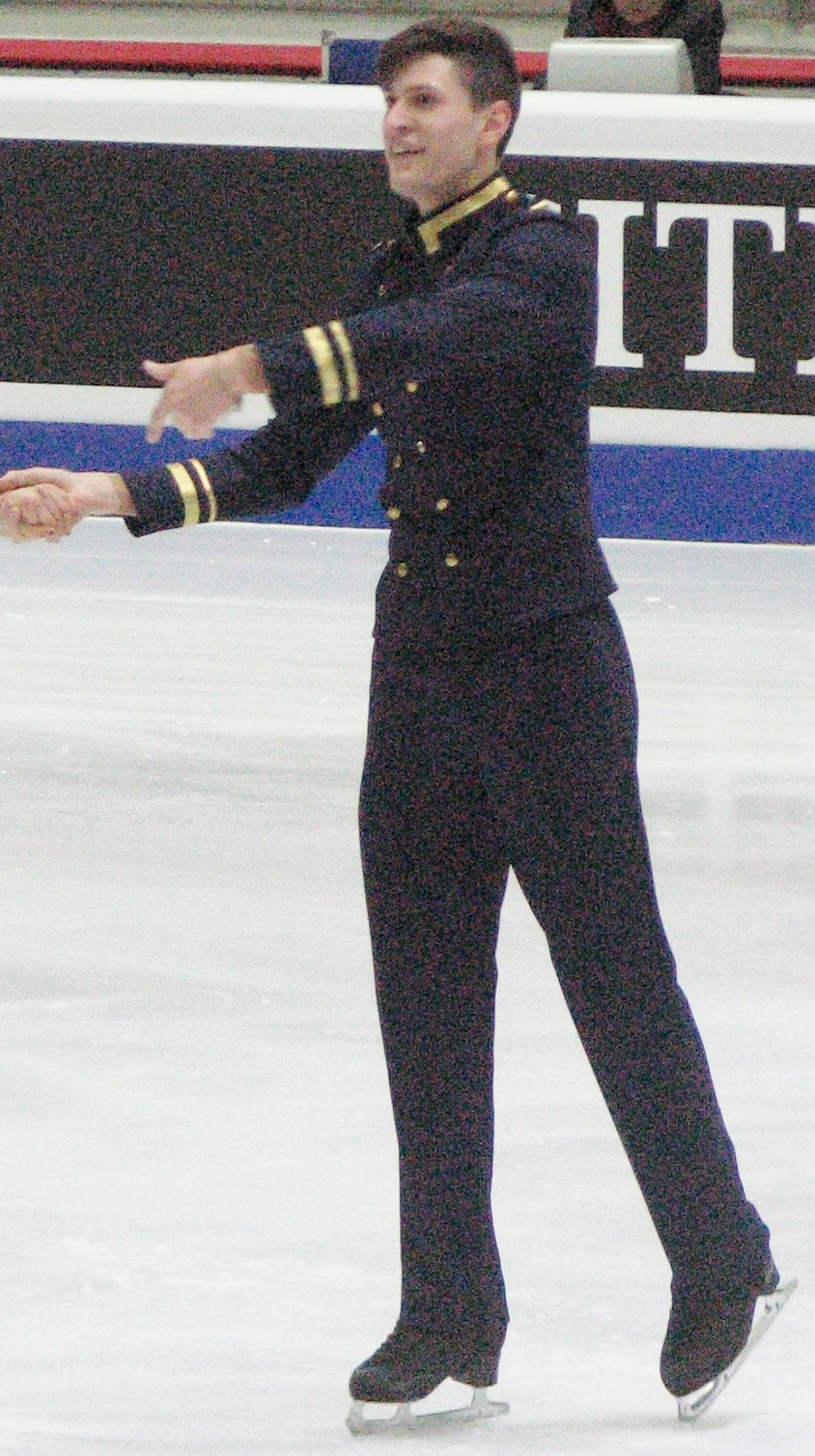
- Boudreau-Audet in 2015

Personal information
- Other names: Francis Boudreault-Audet
- Born: November 8, 1993 (age 33) Saint-Jean-sur-Richelieu, Quebec, Canada
- Height: 1.85 m (6 ft 1 in)

Figure skating career
- Country: Canada; Japan (until 2018)
- Partner: Nadine Wang; Sumire Suto (2015–2017); Ami Koga (2013–2015)
- Coach: Richard Gauthier, Bruno Marcotte
- Skating club: CPA Saint-Jean-sur-Richelieu
- Began skating: 2001
Medal record
Pairs' figure skating
Representing Japan (with Suto)
World Team Trophy
Gold medal – first place	2017 Tokyo	Team
Representing Japan (with Koga)
World Team Trophy
Bronze medal – third place	2015 Tokyo	Team

Francis Boudreau-Audet (born November 8, 1993) is a Canadian pair skater, currently competing with Nadine Wang for Canada.

He previously competed with Sumire Suto for Japan, and was the 2016 Toruń Cup champion and a two-time Japanese national champion.

== Personal life ==
Around 2021, Boudreau-Audet began a career as a development engineer for OrthoPediatrics—a Canadian company that designs implants for children with orthopedic conditions.

== Career ==
Boudreau-Audet began learning to skate in 2001.

=== Partnership with Koga ===
His partnership with Japan's Ami Koga lasted two seasons. In December 2013, they were awarded the junior silver medal at the Japan Championships, having finished second to Sumire Suto / Konstantin Chizhikov. Making their international debut, they won silver in junior pairs at the Bavarian Open in February 2014.

Koga/Boudreau-Audet competed in the 2014–15 ISU Junior Grand Prix series, placing 4th in Tallinn and 6th in Zagreb. In March 2015, they finished 6th at the 2015 World Junior Championships in Tallinn. They were coached by Richard Gauthier, Bruno Marcotte, Cynthia Lemaire, and Sylvie Fullum in Montreal, Quebec, Canada.

=== Partnership with Suto ===
==== 2015–16 season ====
Boudreau-Audet teamed up with Japan's Sumire Suto in the spring of 2015. They decided to represent Japan in senior pairs, coached by Richard Gauthier and Bruno Marcotte in Montreal, Canada. Their international debut came in December 2015 at the Golden Spin of Zagreb, where they placed 7th. Later that month, they won the Japanese national title, ahead of Marin Ono / Wesley Killing and Miu Suzaki / Ryuichi Kihara.

In January 2016, Suto/Boudreau-Audet were awarded gold at the Toruń Cup. They went on the place 9th at the 2016 Four Continents in Taipei and 22nd at the 2016 World Championships in Boston

==== 2016–17 season ====
Suto/Boudreau-Audet began their season on the Challenger Series, placing fourth at the 2016 U.S. International Classic. They finished 7th at their Grand Prix assignment, the 2016 NHK Trophy. The two repeated as Japanese national champions, outscoring Suzaki / Kihara by 14 points for the title.

== Programs ==
=== With Suto ===
Season	Short program	Free skating
2017–18	Sakura (Spring Blossom) by Naotarō Moriyama performed by André Rieu choreo. by Julie Marcotte	The Beatles Medley; Girl; Let It Be; All My Loving; I Want to Hold Your Hand
2016–17	Sakura (Spring Blossom) by Naotarō Moriyama performed by André Rieu choreo. by Julie Marcotte	The Umbrellas of Cherbourg by Michel Legrand choreo. by Julie Marcotte
2015–16	La Vie en rose performed by Louis Armstrong choreo. by Julie Marcotte	The Umbrellas of Cherbourg by Michel Legrand choreo. by Julie Marcotte

=== With Koga ===
Season	Short program	Free skating
2014–15	Un bel dia (from Madama Butterfly) by Giacomo Puccini	Spellbound Concerto by Miklós Rózsa

== Competitive highlights ==
GP: Grand Prix; CS: Challenger Series; JGP: Junior Grand Prix

=== With Wang for Canada ===
International
Event	2019–20
CS U.S. Classic	9th
CS Warsaw	9th
National
Canadian Champ.	8th
TBD = Assigned; WD = Withdrew

=== With Suto for Japan ===
International
Event	2015–16	2016–17	2017–18
World Champ.	22nd	17th	
Four Continents Champ.	9th	10th	
GP NHK Trophy		7th	7th
GP Rostelecom Cup			8th
CS Nebelhorn Trophy			11th
CS U.S. Classic		4th	8th
Toruń Cup	1st	1st	
National
Japan Champ.	1st	1st	
Team events
World Team; Trophy		1st T 6th P	
TBD = Assigned; WD = Withdrew; T = Team result; P = Personal result. Medals awarded for team result only.

=== With Koga for Japan ===
International
Event	2013–14	2014–15
World Junior Champ.		6th
JGP Croatia		6th
JGP Estonia		4th
Bavarian Open	2nd J	
Challenge Cup		1st J
National
Japan Junior Champ.	2nd	1st
Team events
World Team Trophy		3rd T 6th P
J = Junior level T = Team result; P = Personal result.
