= Nicholas Vrdoljak =

Croatian figure skater (born 1996)

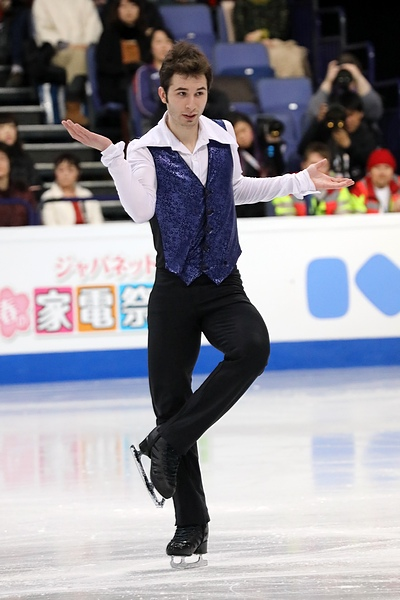

Personal information
- Other names: Nikola Vrdoljak
- Born: July 11, 1996 (age 30) Hinsdale, Illinois, United States
- Home town: Westmont, Illinois
- Height: 1.95 m (6 ft 5 in)

Figure skating career
- Country: Croatia
- Coach: Yevgeny Martynov
- Began skating: 2004

Nicholas Vrdoljak or Nikola Vrdoljak (born July 11, 1996) is a Croatian figure skater. He has competed at one World and two European Championships, qualifying to the free skate at the 2016 European Championships.

== Personal life ==
Vrdoljak was born on July 11, 1996, in Hinsdale, Illinois, United States. His parents are from Split, Croatia. His father died in 2007. Growing up in a family of auto enthusiasts, he enjoys building, tuning, and racing muscle cars. Vrdoljak attends College of DuPage majoring in Automotive Technology.

== Career ==
Vrdoljak began learning to skate in 2004. He became the 2009 U.S. national juvenile champion and 2013 U.S. national novice bronze medalist. He placed 5th in the junior ranks at the 2014 U.S. Championships. He made no international appearances for the United States.

Vrdoljak debuted internationally for Croatia in September 2015, placing 8th at a Junior Grand Prix event in Colorado Springs, Colorado. Making his first senior-level appearance, he placed 10th at the 2015 CS Golden Spin of Zagreb in December. In January, he competed at the 2016 European Championships in Bratislava, Slovakia; he qualified to the free skate and finished 21st overall.

Vrdoljak placed 26th at the 2017 European Championships in Ostrava, Czech Republic, and 34th at the 2017 World Championships in Helsinki, Finland.

== Programs ==
Season	Short program	Free skating
2017–2018	Black Cat, White Cat by Goran Bregović	Welcome to the Machine; Coming Back to Life by Pink Floyd
2016–2017	Black Cat, White Cat by Goran Bregović	Notre-Dame de Paris by Riccardo Cocciante
2015–2016	Les Misérables by Claude-Michel Schönberg; Bring Him Home; Finale	La Dolce Vita by Nino Rota
2008–2009		The Mask of Zorro by James Horner

== Competitive highlights ==
CS: Challenger Series; JGP: Junior Grand Prix

=== For Croatia ===
International
Event	15–16	16–17	17–18
World Champ.		34th	34th
European Champ.	21st	26th	27th
CS Autumn Classic		8th	
CS Golden Spin	10th	13th	13th
CS Nebelhorn Trophy			16th
CS Tallinn Trophy			16th
Ice Star		5th	
Philadelphia			12th
International: Junior
World Junior Champ.	26th		
JGP United States	8th		

=== United States ===
International
Event	13–14
U.S. Championships	5th J
