= Sumire Suto =

Japanese figure skater

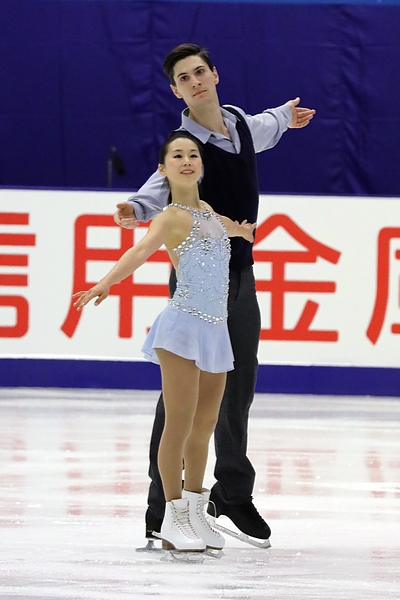
- Suto/Boudreau-Audet at the 2016 NHK Trophy

Personal information
- Native name: 須藤澄玲
- Born: November 12, 1997 (age 28) Yokohama, Japan
- Height: 1.51 m (4 ft 11 1/2 in)

Figure skating career
- Country: Japan
- Partner: Francis Boudreau-Audet
- Coach: Richard Gauthier, Bruno Marcotte
- Skating club: Kanagawa FSC Yokohama
- Began skating: 2006
Medal record
Pairs' figure skating
Representing Japan (with Boudreau-Audet)
World Team Trophy
| Gold medal – first place | 2017 Tokyo | Team |

Sumire Suto (須藤 澄玲, Sutō Sumire; born November 12, 1997) is a Japanese pair skater. With partner Francis Boudreau-Audet, she is the 2016 Toruń Cup champion and a two-time Japanese national champion.

== Early career ==
Suto began learning to skate in 2006.

=== Partnership with Chizhikov ===
Suto began her partnership with Konstantin Chizhikov in 2013. In December of the same year, they won the Japanese national junior title, ahead of Ami Koga / Francis Boudreau-Audet. Making their international debut, they placed 4th in junior pairs at the International Challenge Cup in March 2014. Later that month, the two finished 12th at the 2014 World Junior Championships in Sofia, Bulgaria.

Suto/Chizhikov competed in the 2014–15 ISU Junior Grand Prix series, placing 7th in Ostrava and 9th in Dresden. They were coached by Yuka Sato, Jason Dungjen, and Sergei Petrovski in Bloomfield Hills, Michigan.

== Partnership with Boudreau-Audet ==
=== 2015–16 season ===
Suto teamed up with Francis Boudreau-Audet in the spring of 2015. They decided to represent Japan in senior pairs, coached by Richard Gauthier and Bruno Marcotte in Montreal, Canada. Their international debut came in December 2015 at the Golden Spin of Zagreb, where they placed 7th. Later that month, they won the Japanese national title, ahead of Marin Ono / Wesley Killing and Miu Suzaki / Ryuichi Kihara.

In January 2016, Suto/Boudreau-Audet were awarded gold at the Toruń Cup. They went on the place 9th at the 2016 Four Continents in Taipei and 22nd at the 2016 World Championships in Boston

=== 2016–17 season ===
Suto/Boudreau-Audet began their season on the Challenger Series, placing fourth at the 2016 U.S. International Classic. They finished 7th at their Grand Prix assignment, the 2016 NHK Trophy. The two repeated as Japanese national champions, outscoring Suzaki/Kihara by 14 points for the title.

== Programs ==
=== With Boudreau-Audet ===
| Season | Short program | Free skating |
|---|---|---|
| 2017–18 | Sakura (Spring Blossom) by Naotarō Moriyama performed by André Rieu choreo. by Julie Marcotte | The Beatles Medley; Girl; Let It Be; All My Loving; I Want to Hold Your Hand |
| 2016–17 | Sakura (Spring Blossom) by Naotarō Moriyama performed by André Rieu choreo. by Julie Marcotte | The Umbrellas of Cherbourg by Michel Legrand choreo. by Julie Marcotte |
| 2015–16 | La Vie en rose performed by Louis Armstrong choreo. by Julie Marcotte | The Umbrellas of Cherbourg by Michel Legrand choreo. by Julie Marcotte |

=== With Chizhikov ===
| Season | Short program | Free skating |
|---|---|---|
| 2014–15 | The Way You Look Tonight by Dorothy Fields | Piano Concerto No. 5 in E Flat, Op. 73 (Emperor Concerto) by Ludwig van Beethoven |
| 2013–14 | Memoirs of a Geisha by John Williams | Piano Concerto No. 5 in E Flat, Op. 73 (Emperor Concerto) by Ludwig van Beethoven |

== Competitive highlights ==
GP: Grand Prix; CS: Challenger Series; JGP: Junior Grand Prix

=== With Boudreau-Audet ===
International
| Event | 2015–16 | 2016–17 | 2017–18 |
|---|---|---|---|
| World Champ. | 22nd | 17th | |
| Four Continents Champ. | 9th | 10th | |
| GP NHK Trophy | | 7th | 7th |
| GP Rostelecom Cup | | | 8th |
| CS Golden Spin | 7th | | |
| CS Nebelhorn Trophy | | | 11th |
| CS U.S. Classic | | 4th | 8th |
| Toruń Cup | 1st | 1st | |
National
| Japan Championships | 1st | 1st | WD |
Team events
| World Team; Trophy | | 1st T 6th P | |
TBD = Assigned; WD = Withdrew; T = Team result; P = Personal result. Medals awarded for team result only.

=== With Chizhikov ===
International
| Event | 2013–14 | 2014–15 |
|---|---|---|
| World Junior Champ. | 12th | |
| JGP Czech Republic | | 7th |
| JGP Germany | | 9th |
| Challenge Cup | 4th J | |
National
| Japan Junior Champ. | 1st | |
J = Junior level
