= Evgenia Medvedeva =

Russian retired figure skater (born 1999)

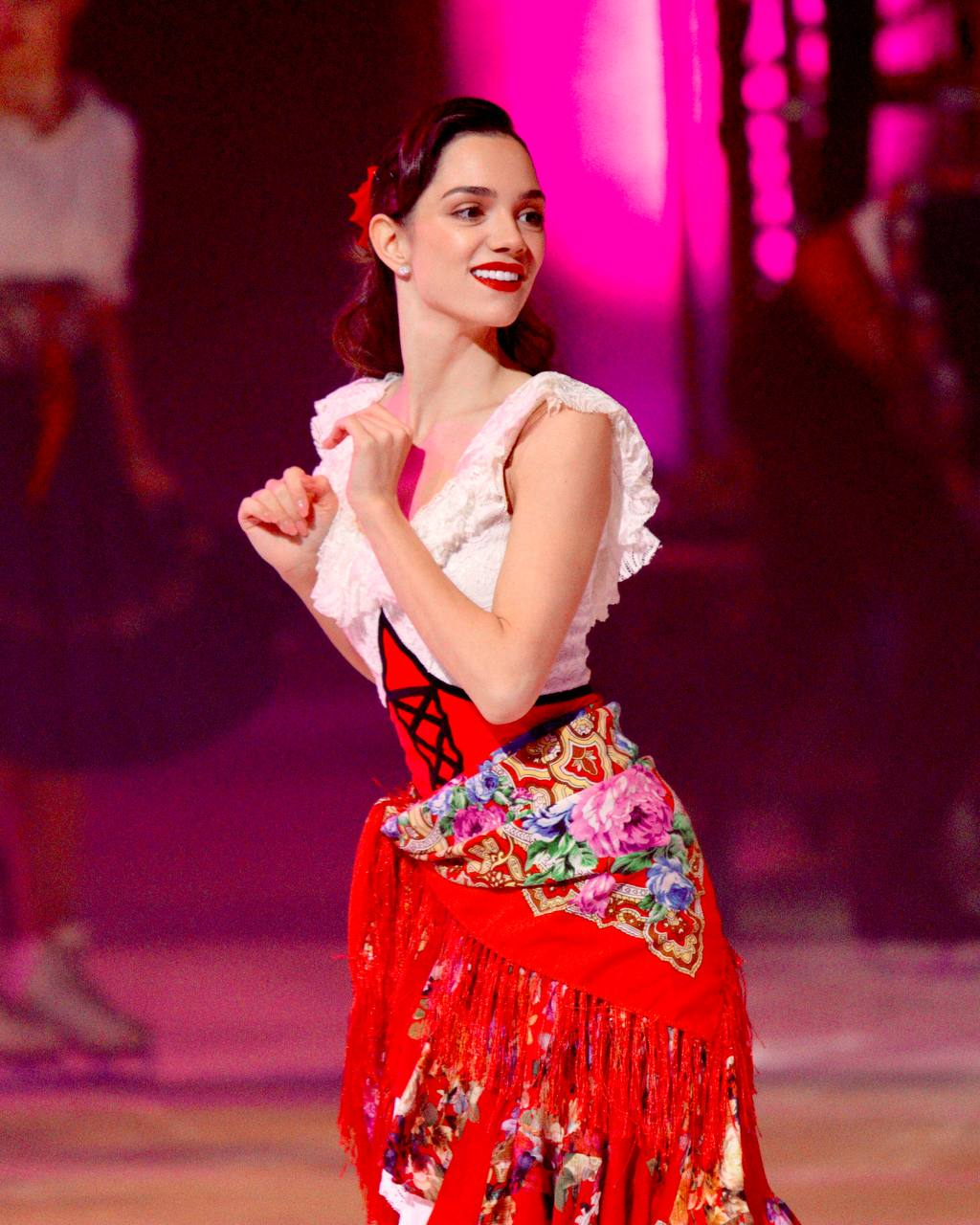
- Evgenia Medvedeva at the ice show Carmen in 2024

Personal information
- Native name: Евгения Армановна Медведева
- Full name: Evgenia Armanovna Medvedeva
- Other names: Yevgenia Medvedeva; Zhenya (nickname)
- Born: Evgenia Armanovna Babasyan; 19 November 1999 (age 27) Moscow, Russia
- Height: 1.59 m (5 ft 3 in)

Figure skating career
- Country: Russia
- Discipline: Women's singles
- Began skating: 2003
- Retired: 2021
- Highest WS: 1st (2016–17)

Medal record
| Event | Gold medal – first place | Silver medal – second place | Bronze medal – third place |
| Olympic Games | 0 | 2 | 0 |
| World Championships | 2 | 0 | 1 |
| European Championships | 2 | 1 | 0 |
| Grand Prix Final | 2 | 0 | 0 |
| Russian Championships | 2 | 0 | 1 |
| World Team Trophy | 0 | 1 | 0 |
| World Junior Championships | 1 | 0 | 1 |
| Junior Grand Prix Final | 1 | 0 | 1 |
Medal list
Olympic Games
| Silver medal – second place | 2018 Pyeongchang | Singles |
| Silver medal – second place | 2018 Pyeongchang | Team |
World Championships
| Gold medal – first place | 2016 Boston | Singles |
| Gold medal – first place | 2017 Helsinki | Singles |
| Bronze medal – third place | 2019 Saitama | Singles |
European Championships
| Gold medal – first place | 2016 Bratislava | Singles |
| Gold medal – first place | 2017 Ostrava | Singles |
| Silver medal – second place | 2018 Moscow | Singles |
Grand Prix Final
| Gold medal – first place | 2015–16 Barcelona | Singles |
| Gold medal – first place | 2016–17 Marseille | Singles |
Russian Championships
| Gold medal – first place | 2016 Yekaterinburg | Singles |
| Gold medal – first place | 2017 Chelyabinsk | Singles |
| Bronze medal – third place | 2015 Sochi | Singles |
World Team Trophy
| Silver medal – second place | 2017 Tokyo | Team |
World Junior Championships
| Gold medal – first place | 2015 Tallinn | Singles |
| Bronze medal – third place | 2014 Sofia | Singles |
Junior Grand Prix Final
| Gold medal – first place | 2014–15 Barcelona | Singles |
| Bronze medal – third place | 2013–14 Fukuoka | Singles |

Evgenia Armanovna Medvedeva (alt. spelling: Yevgenia Medvedeva; Russian: Евгения Армановна Медведева, IPA: [jɪvˈɡʲenʲɪjə mʲɪˈdvʲedʲɪvə]; born 19 November 1999), is a retired competitive Russian figure skater. She is the 2018 PyeongChang Olympic silver medalist (2018 women's singles, 2018 team event), a two-time world champion (2016, 2017), a two-time European champion (2016, 2017), a two-time Grand Prix Final champion (2015, 2016), a two-time Russian national champion (2016, 2017), silver medalist at the 2018 European Figure Skating Championships and bronze medalist at the 2019 World Championships. Earlier in her career, she won the 2015 World Junior Championships, the 2014 Junior Grand Prix Final, and the 2015 Russian Junior Championships.

Medvedeva is the first women's singles skater to win senior Worlds the year after winning Junior Worlds, and the first women's singles skater to win two consecutive senior Worlds the year after winning Junior Worlds. At the 2017 World Championships, she became the first female skater to win back-to-back world titles in 16 years since Michelle Kwan did so in 2000 and 2001, and is currently the only Russian woman ever to successfully defend her world title. She became one of only four women to achieve a Grand Slam (winning all the main competitions of the same season), and the first skater (all disciplines included) to complete two Grand Slams in a row (2015–2016; 2016–2017).

Under the ISU Judging System, she has set the world record score 13 times and is the first female skater to surpass the 80-point short program mark, the 160-point free skating mark, and the 230-point and the 240-point total mark.

== Early and personal life ==
Evgenia's mother, Zhanna Medvedeva (maiden name — Devyatova), a former Russian figure skater who quit the sport aged 14, and father Arman Babasyan, an Armenian businessman, are divorced. Both of her parents wanted her to practice figure skating to improve her figure. She competes under the surname Medvedeva, which was the maiden name of her maternal grandmother. Her birth surname is Babasyan. She briefly dated Russian-Uzbek pair skater Dmitrii Chigirev from 2023 to 2024. In 2025, she announced her engagement to Russian dancer Ildar Gaynutdinov. On 29 August 2026, the couple was married.

In 2017, she commenced her university studies and enrolled at the Russian State University of Physical Education, Sport, Youth and Tourism. Since 1 September 2021 she is a student of Moscow State University.

Her figure skating idols are Evgeni Plushenko and Yuna Kim. She is known to friends as "Zhenya" and "Janny". Evgenia speaks English in addition to Russian, as well as basic Japanese. Medvedeva is a supporter of FC Dynamo Moscow

She relocated to Toronto, Canada, in mid-2018 and trained at the Toronto Cricket Skating and Curling Club until September 2020 when she rejoined her old coach in Russia, Eteri Tutberidze.

She has two French Bulldogs, Jerry and Tofu.

She said of the Russian invasion of Ukraine, which began on 24 February 2022, "this all has [to end] as soon as possible, like a bad dream".

In October 2024, Medvedeva performed as a guest during the gala exhibition at the 2024 CS Denis Ten Memorial Challenge, where she honored late friend, Denis Ten, by skating to music that he had composed himself.

== Career ==
=== Early years ===
On the ice from the age of three, Medvedeva was taught initially by Elena Proskurina, Lubov Yakovleva, and Elena Selivanova. Around 2007, she joined Eteri Tutberidze at the Olympic Reserve Sports School no. 37, renamed Sambo 70.

Medvedeva made her senior national debut at the 2012 Russian Championships, finishing eighth. She competed despite her left wrist being fractured and in a cast. She then placed sixth on the junior level. She sustained an injury at the start of the following season and did not qualify for the senior Russian Nationals. She finished fourth behind Maria Sotskova at the 2013 Russian Junior Championships.

=== 2013–2014 season: Junior international debut ===
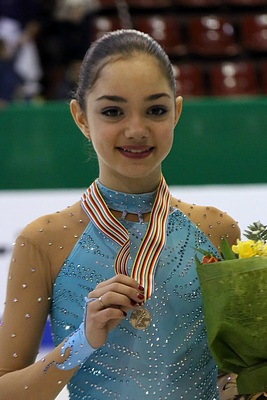
Medvedeva at the 2014 World Junior Championships podium

Medvedeva's international debut came in the 2013–2014 season. Competing on the ISU Junior Grand Prix series, she won gold first in Riga, Latvia, and then in Gdańsk, Poland. She qualified to the JGP Final in Fukuoka, Japan, where she won the bronze medal behind Sotskova and Serafima Sakhanovich. At the 2014 Russian Championships, she finished seventh in her second senior appearance and then fourth on the junior level. Medvedeva was assigned to replace the injured Sotskova at the 2014 World Junior Championships in Sofia, Bulgaria. Placing third in both segments, she won the bronze medal while Elena Radionova and Sakhanovich took gold and silver respectively, producing Russia's second consecutive sweep of the World Junior podium in the women's event.

=== 2014–2015 season: World Junior champion ===
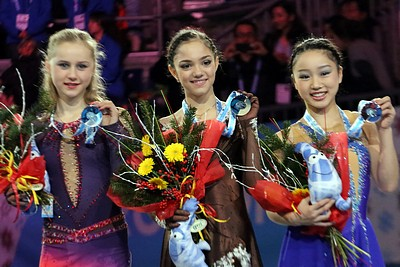
Medvedeva (center) with Serafima Sakhanovich (left) and Wakaba Higuchi (right) at the 2014–15 JGP Final podium

Medvedeva's first assignment of the 2014 JGP season was in Courchevel, France, where she won the gold medal by a margin of 21 points over silver medalist Rin Nitaya of Japan. At her second event, in Ostrava, Czech Republic, she placed second in both segments and edged Japan's Wakaba Higuchi for the gold by 1.44 points. She qualified for the Junior Grand Prix Final in Barcelona, Spain, where she won gold, placing first in both the short program and free skate.

At the 2015 Russian Championships, she placed third in both segments and won the bronze medal, her first senior national medal, behind Elena Radionova and Elizaveta Tuktamysheva. She then took gold at the 2015 Russian Junior Championships, finishing almost 20 points ahead of silver medalist Maria Sotskova.

At the 2015 World Junior Championships in Tallinn, Estonia, Medvedeva placed first after the short program and set a new world record of 68.48 points for junior women's short program. In the free program, she placed first again and won gold. She had no falls on the ice throughout the season in international events.

=== 2015–2016 season: World and European titles ===
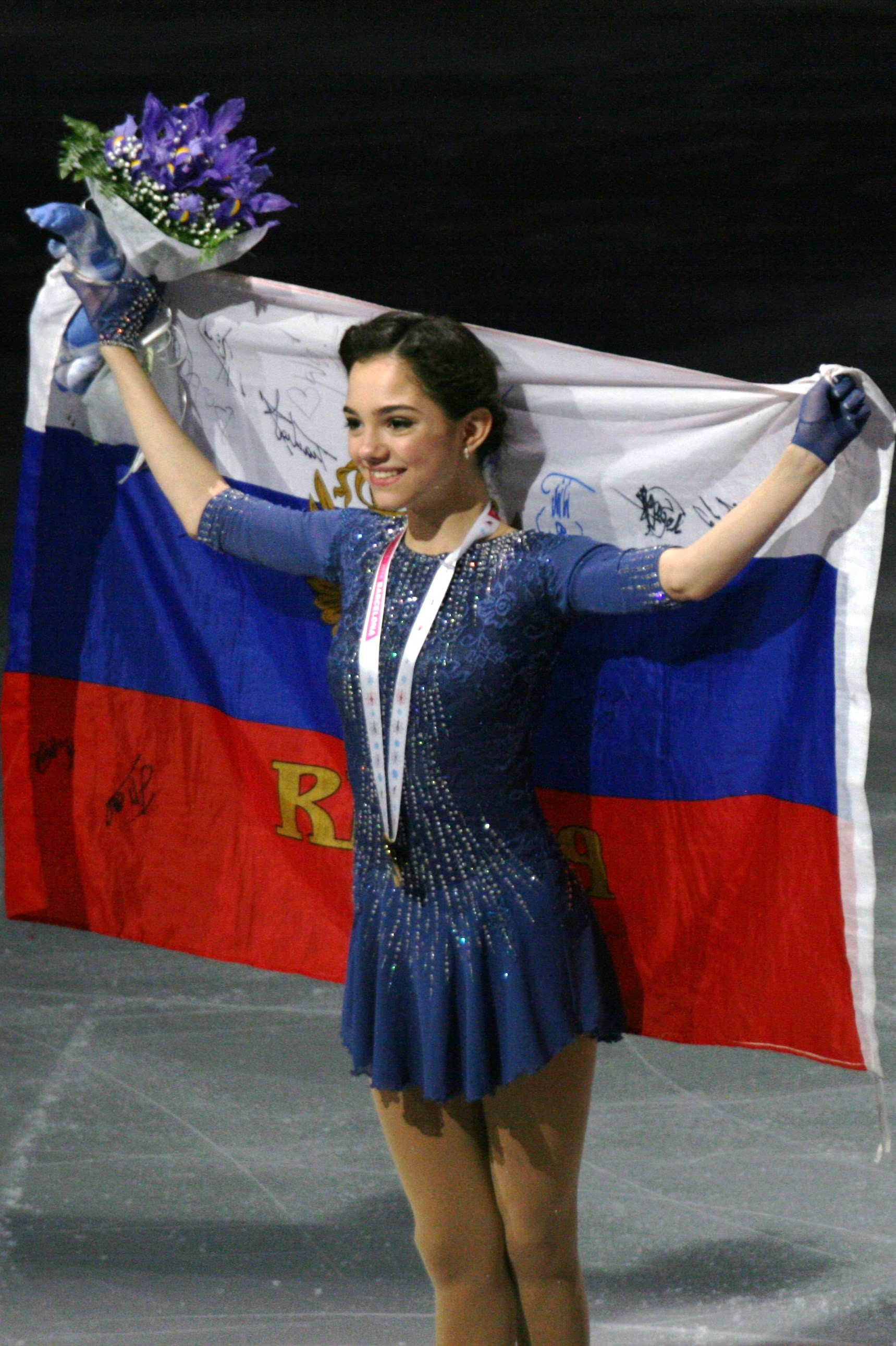
Medvedeva at the 2015–16 Grand Prix Final podium

Medvedeva became age-eligible to compete at the senior international level for the 2015–2016 season. She started her season with a gold medal at the 2015 Ondrej Nepela Trophy, an ISU Challenger Series (CS) event in early October. Later that month, she competed at her first senior Grand Prix event – 2015 Skate America. Finishing first in the short program and second in the free skate, she won the gold medal ahead of Gracie Gold of the United States. During practice, she fell into the boards and sustained an injury; her coaches taped her elbow and gave her painkillers, and she was later diagnosed with a fracture. Medvedeva won silver at her next Grand Prix assignment, the 2015 Rostelecom Cup, behind compatriot Elena Radionova.

In December, at the Grand Prix Final in Barcelona, Spain, Medvedeva placed first in both segments on her way to the gold medal, ahead of Satoko Miyahara, and became the fifth-youngest Grand Prix Final champion, at age 16. At the end of the month, she won gold at the 2016 Russian Championships, ahead of silver medalist Radionova.

In January 2016, Medvedeva competed at her first senior-level ISU Championships, the 2016 European Championships in Bratislava, Slovakia. She finished first in both the short and free programs despite falling on her double Axel jump in the free skate. She won the gold medal while her teammates Radionova (−5.46) and Anna Pogorilaya (−28.40) took silver and bronze respectively, producing the second consecutive Russian sweep of the podium.

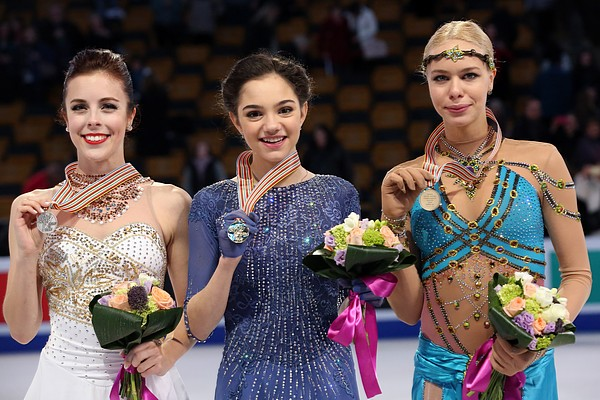
Medvedeva (center) with Ashley Wagner (left) and Anna Pogorilaya (right) on the 2016 World Championships podium

In March 2016, Medvedeva won the gold medal at the 2016 World Championships in Boston, United States. After finishing third in the short program, Medvedeva clinched the gold medal by winning the free skate with a world record score of 150.10, surpassing Yuna Kim's 150.06 mark. Her overall score of 223.86 was a new personal best and was 8.47 points ahead of silver medalist Ashley Wagner. Having won the Junior World title in 2015, 16-year-old Medvedeva became the first women's singles skater to have ever won back-to-back Junior World Championships and senior World Championships. She matched Kimmie Meissner's feat in becoming the second skater in 23 years to win in her debut at the world championships, and is the youngest world figure skating champion (16 years, 4 months) under modern rules (since Tara Lipinski in 1997, not yet 15 at the time). Medvedeva also became the second women's skater to win the Grand Prix Final, Europeans, Worlds and her country's national championships all in one season (the other was countrywoman Irina Slutskaya).

Medvedeva ranked first in both segments at the 2016 Team Challenge Cup in Spokane, Washington. Team Europe finished in third place in the head-to-head competition and in second place in the main event. In addition to the two team medals, Medvedeva received prize money for the top women's short program score.

=== 2016–2017 season: Eight world records and second World title ===
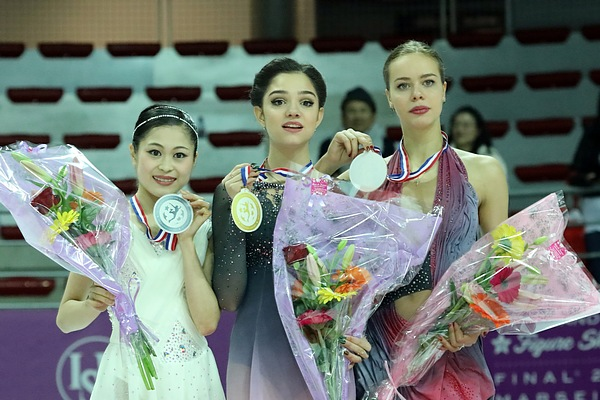
Medvedeva (center) with Satoko Miyahara (left) and Anna Pogorilaya (right) at the 2016–17 Grand Prix Final podium

Medvedeva began her Grand Prix season at the 2016 Skate Canada International. Ranked first in both segments, she won the gold medal ahead of Kaetlyn Osmond and Satoko Miyahara. She then placed first in both segments at the 2016 Trophée de France on her way to another GP title. She scored 78.52 points in the short program, the second highest score in the women's event and just 0.14 from a world record held by Mao Asada. She collected 15 points from both events and qualified for the Grand Prix Final with maximum points.

At the Final in Marseille, France, Medvedeva became the world record holder for the women's short program score (79.21) previously held by Mao Asada. She also won the title with an overall score 9.33 points ahead of silver medalist Satoko Miyahara. With the win, Medvedeva joined Irina Slutskaya, Tara Lipinski, Yuna Kim, and Mao Asada as the only women to win back-to-back Grand Prix Final titles.

In December 2016, Medvedeva defended her national title at the 2017 Russian Championships, despite the third jump of her 3S-3T-3T combination receiving no points. She stated, "Previously, the entire element would have received zero points, but now only the third triple toe would be discarded and I thought since I can do it, why not try?". In January 2017, she competed at the European Championships in Ostrava, Czech Republic. Finishing first in both the short program and the free skate, she won the gold medal while her teammates Pogorilaya (−18.32) and Sotskova (−37.19) took silver and fourth place respectively. She also reset the free skate world record (previously held by herself) with a score of 150.79 and became the current world record holder for the women's combined total score (229.71), which was previously held by Yuna Kim.

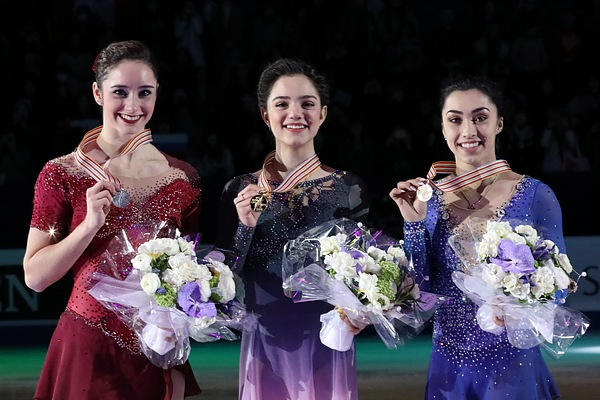
Medvedeva (centre) with Kaetlyn Osmond (left) and Gabrielle Daleman (right) on the 2017 World Championships podium

In March 2017, she competed at the World Championships, held in Helsinki, Finland. Ranked first in both segments, she set the world for record points in the free skate (154.40 points) and combined score (233.41 points), becoming the first female skater to break the 230-point mark in the combined total score. Her overall score was 15.28 points higher than silver medalist Kaetlyn Osmond. Medvedeva was the only skater in the competition to receive 10.00s in performance as part of the component score. She became the first female skater to win back-to-back world titles in 16 years (since Michelle Kwan in 2000 and 2001), and the first Russian woman ever to successfully defend her world title.

In April 2017, Medvedeva competed on Team Russia at the 2017 World Team Trophy held in Tokyo, Japan. She placed first in the short program with a new world record score of 80.85, becoming the first female skater to break the 80-point mark for the women's short program score. She placed first again in the free skate with another world record score of 160.46, becoming the first female skater to break the 160-point mark for the women's free skating score. Medvedeva contributed the maximum 24 points and helped Team Russia win their second consecutive silver medal while Team Japan and Team USA won gold and bronze respectively. Even though the combined total score was not given at the event, ISU later ratified her combined world record total score of 241.31; thus, Medvedeva became the first female skater to break the 240-point mark in the combined total score. She stated, "I went out on the ice absolutely calm, there was no shadow of a doubt or lack of confidence in me."

=== 2017–2018 season: 2018 Winter Olympics and coach change ===
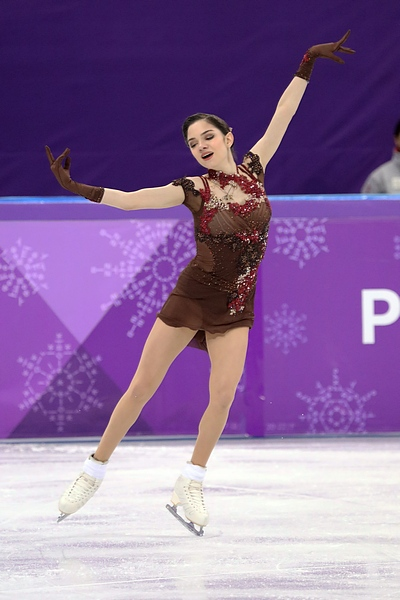
Medvedeva performing her free program at the 2018 Winter Olympics

Medvedeva continued her winning streak with a gold medal at the 2017 CS Ondrej Nepela Trophy in Bratislava, Slovakia. However, after this competition she decided to change her long program to Anna Karenina, which debuted at the Japan Open. In mid-October, a few days before the 2017 Rostelecom Cup, she was diagnosed with a crack in the metatarsal bone in her right foot. She won her Grand Prix event in Russia as well as the 2017 NHK Trophy, held a month later in Osaka, Japan. However, her foot injury forced her to withdraw from the Grand Prix Final and the Russian National Championship, and could not defend her title at either event.

At the 2018 Europeans, held in Moscow, Medvedeva finished second to teammate Alina Zagitova. On the next day, Sunday, January 21, she was named for the Russian Olympic team together with Zagitova and Sotskova.

During Medvedeva's first performance of the 2018 Winter Olympics, at the women's short program of the team event, she placed first with a record score of 81.06, a personal best and world record for women's short program. The 10 points for the first place in the women's short program helped Russia to a silver medal in the team figure skating competition.

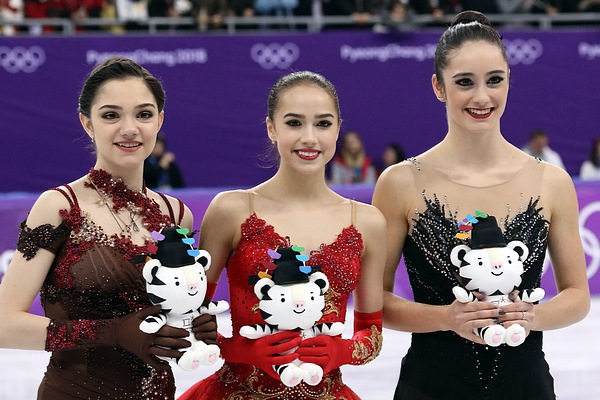
Medvedeva (left) with Alina Zagitova (center) and Kaetlyn Osmond (right) at the 2018 Winter Olympics podium

In the individual event, Medvedeva ranked second in the short program with a score of 81.61, breaking another world record before it was surpassed by her teammate, Alina Zagitova. She then scored 156.65 points in the free skating program for a total of 238.26 points, putting her in second place behind Zagitova, who also scored 156.65 points in the free skating program for a total score of 239.57, and earning her an Olympic silver medal.

On 7 May 2018, Medvedeva announced in a statement that she was ending her partnership with longtime coach Eteri Tutberidze and relocating to Toronto to train under coach Brian Orser. She would continue to represent Russia and her current club (Sambo 70) while training in Canada. Medvedeva stated the reason for ending her partnership with former coach, Tutberidze, in an Instagram Live. She said that she 'left to work together with a coach like friends' and that the move was not motivated by her wanting better results. She then went on to explain that whilst she did not exactly see herself as friends with her coach, she saw herself as working on same level as Orser and that mainly she left 'to hear, and to be heard.'

=== 2018–2019 season: Struggles and World bronze medal ===
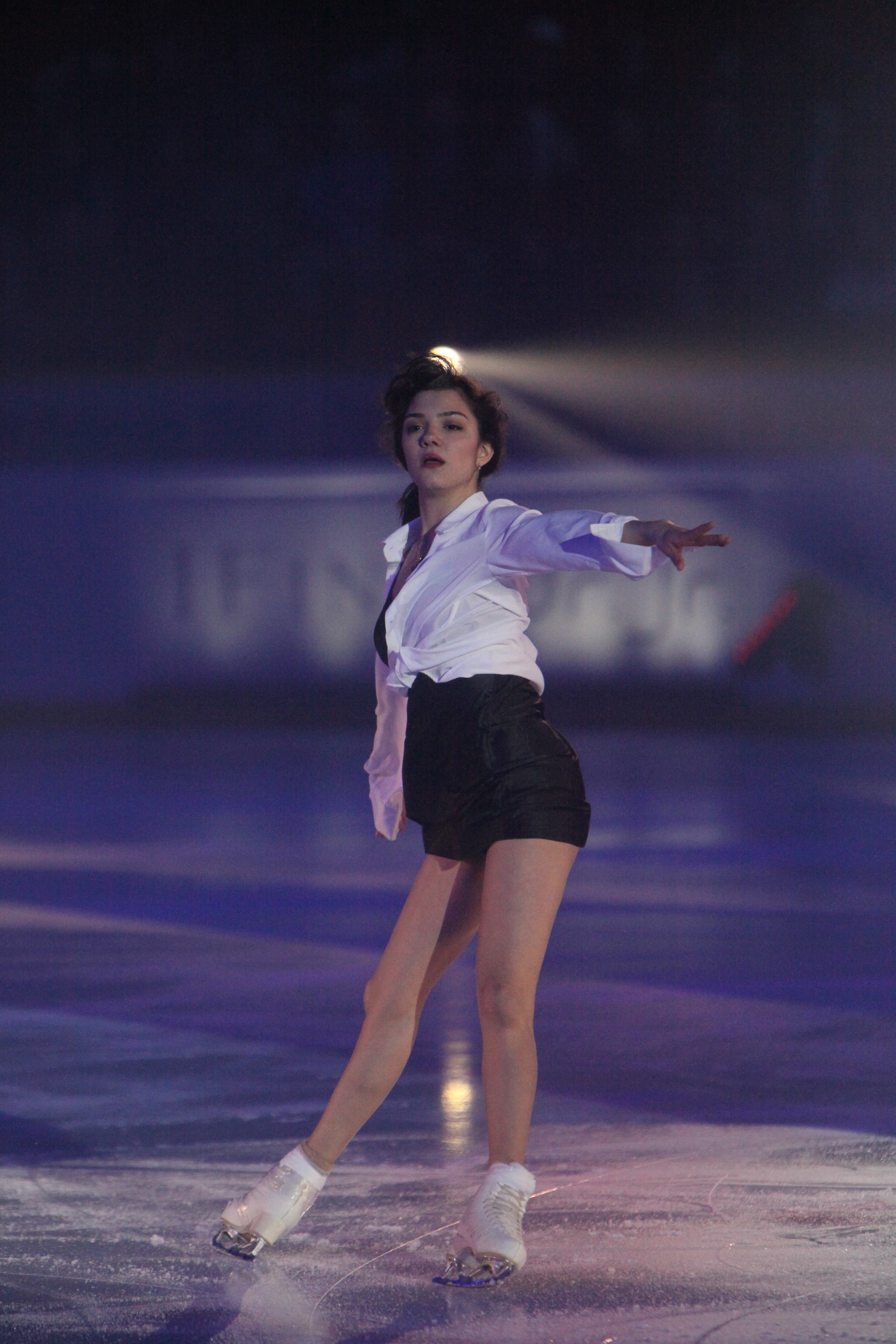
Medvedeva at the 2018 Internationaux de France Gala

Medvedeva began her first season with her new coaches at Autumn Classic International where she placed first in the short program and second in the free, finishing in second place overall, behind Bradie Tennell and ahead of Maé-Bérénice Méité.

In October, Medvedeva began competing on that year's Grand Prix circuit. At the 2018 Skate Canada, she stepped out on a downgraded triple flip in the short program, missing her combination as a result and placing seventh. She placed first in the free skate to win the bronze medal behind Elizaveta Tuktamysheva and Mako Yamashita. She placed fourth at the 2018 Internationaux de France in November after several falls and under-rotations in both programs. It was the first time Medvedeva finished off an international podium in both her junior and senior career.

Following the disappointment in France, Medvedeva replaced her original "Orange Colored Sky" short program with a new one choreographed by friend Misha Ge to selections from Giacomo Puccini's Tosca. Skating next at the 2019 Russian Championships, her first public performance of the new program went poorly, underrotating the first part of a combination, popping the second jump, and falling on her closing double Axel. Despite this, she said she felt better than after the French Grand Prix. In fourteenth place going into the free skate, she performed much better, despite a fall, placing fourth in the free to finish seventh overall, losing not just to junior competitors (who swept the podium), but also to seniors Stanislava Konstantinova, Alina Zagitova and Sofia Samodurova. Speaking afterward she said "even though I made a mistake, I am pleased with today’s performance."

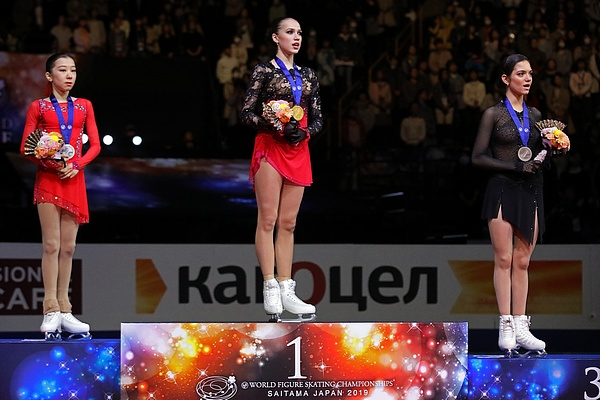
Medvedeva (right) alongside Alina Zagitova (middle) and Elizabet Tursynbaeva (left) at the 2019 World Championships

She was named the second alternate for the European Championships and first alternate for the Winter Universiade; she was called up for the Winter Universiade after Elizaveta Tuktamysheva withdrew, but Medvedeva also withdrew and Maria Sotskova replaced Medvedeva. In February, at the 2019 Russian Cup Final, she won gold after placing first in the short program and second in the free. Medvedeva was selected for the 2019 World Figure Skating Championships team.

At the 2019 World Championships, Medvedeva skated despite sustaining an injury in her thigh. She placed fourth in the short program after underrotating the second part of her combination jump. She performed a clean free skate apart from an underrotated double Axel, placing third in that segment, and won the bronze medal. She declined an invitation to the World Team Trophy, to recover from her injury.

=== 2019–2020 season ===
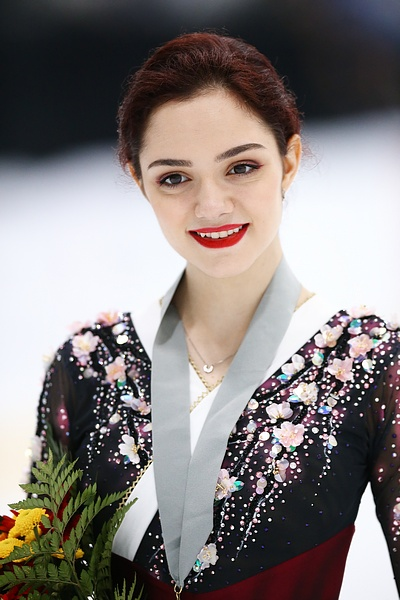
Medvedeva at the 2019 CS Autumn Classic International

Medvedeva began the season with Autumn Classic International, where she finished second in both programs, winning the silver medal behind Rika Kihira. At the Shanghai Trophy, she competed despite not having fully recovered from a high fever that had forced her to miss a week of training before the event. She nonetheless placed first in the short program and second in the free skate to place first overall over Elizabet Tursynbaeva and Lim Eun-soo, winning her first international gold medal with coach Brian Orser and the first international gold medal since the NHK Trophy in 2017.

Beginning on the Grand Prix, Medvedeva placed sixth in the short program at Skate Canada after an unsuccessful short program where she underrotated the second part of her triple flip-triple toe loop combination, stepped out of her double Axel, and fell on an underrotated triple Lutz. She came back strongly the next day, placing third in the free skate after Alexandra Trusova and Kihira. Her score of 146.73 was a season's best, moving her up to fifth place overall.

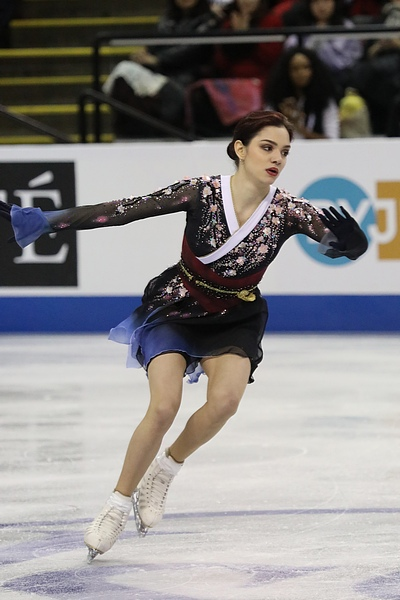
Evgenia at 2019 Skate Canada

At the Rostelecom Cup in her hometown of Moscow, Medvedeva won the short program with a score of 76.93 points, a personal best under the new scoring system. She skated a clean free skate, apart from an edge call on her Lutz, placing second in that segment and taking the silver medal behind Trusova with a new personal best total score of 225.76.

At the 2020 Russian Championships, during early practices, one of Medvedeva's boots broke. Unable to find a substitute pair, she skated the short program on a broken boot and scored 71.08, finishing fifth behind Alena Kostornaia, Anna Shcherbakova, Trusova and Tuktamysheva. After experimenting to skate again with her broken boot during free skating practices, she and Brian Orser decided to withdraw from the competition and start preparing for the upcoming season.

=== 2020–2021 season ===
In April, Medvedeva travelled to Japan in preparation for her Sailor Moon show, which was eventually cancelled due to the COVID-19 pandemic. Unable to return to her Canadian training base due to travel restrictions, she returned to Moscow in June, where she trained at the CSKA rink with Tatiana Tarasova. At the time, Medvedeva was communicating with Orser via Skype and intended to return to Toronto when travel restrictions were eased.

In early September, Medvedeva presented her new programs set to Masquerade Waltz and Alegría at the Russian test skates. She made mistakes in both programs and it was later revealed that she had sustained a chronic back injury.

On 16 September 2020, Medvedeva announced that she would return to train under her former coaches, Eteri Tutberidze, Sergei Dudakov, and Daniil Gleikhengauz. She and Orser parted ways on good terms. According to Orser, Medvedeva possibly could have returned to Canada from Japan, but she was unwilling to travel back without her mother, who had a different visa than her and would not have been able to gain entry.

Medvedeva was assigned to the first and second stages of the Russian Cup series, the qualifying series for the 2021 Russian Championships. However, she withdrew from both competitions and also did not compete at any of the later Russian Cup stages because of chronic back pain. Due to the COVID-19 pandemic, all Grand Prix assignments were mostly domestic ones made based on training location and/or nationality. As a result, Medvedeva was assigned to the 2020 Rostelecom Cup, but later withdrew due to inflammation of her back injury.

In November, Medvedeva reportedly tested positive for COVID-19 after experiencing symptoms. She was admitted to the hospital with severe lung damage. Medvedeva spent most of November and part of December recovering. She returned to training on 8 December and doctors advised her that she could not adequately prepare in two weeks for the 2021 Russian Championships at the end of the month, leading her to withdraw from Nationals. However, she was healthy enough to attend and watch Nationals, and also performed during the exhibition gala.

On 14 May 2021, Medvedeva was not included on the Russian national team for the 2021–22 season.

=== 2021–2022 season: Retirement from competition ===
In June, Medvedeva was not assigned any events on the 2021–22 Grand Prix series. On 5 August, she announced her intention to skip the upcoming season, thus ending her bid for a second Olympic team. On 1 December 2021, Medvedeva announced that she had ended her competitive skating career due to a chronic back injury.

== Skating technique ==
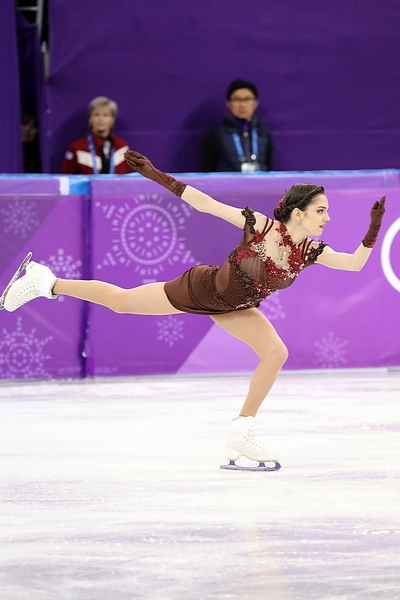
Medvedeva performing a Lutz at the 2018 Winter Olympics

Medvedeva commonly performs almost all of her jumps with an arm over her head, a technique called the "Tano" variation, first popularized by Brian Boitano as part of his triple Lutz jump. She performs several jump combinations ending with a triple toe loop, such as the 3F-3T, 3S-3T, 3Lo-3T and 2A-3T. She is also known for practicing various triple-triple-triple and triple-triple-triple-triple jump combinations. In the 2016–2017 season, Medvedeva also frequently utilized the "Rippon" variation which involves doing jumps with both arms over the head. In the 2018–19 season, Medvedeva also started including the triple loop jump on the end of a combination such as the 3S-3Lo. She has also performed 2A-3Lo, 3Lo-3Lo and 3F-3Lo in practices. She also commonly performs a cross grab I-position spiral towards the centre of the rink near the end of her programs.

== Endorsements ==
Medvedeva appeared on the front cover of the May 2017 issue of Russian Tatler, as well as the July 2017 issue of Elle Girl Russia. She was also on the cover of the March 2018 issue of Top Beauty Russia. She was included in the 2017 SportsPro 50 Most Marketable Athletes List, ranked 46. She was the second figure skater to be featured after the British sports magazine previously listed Yuna Kim in 2013. Medvedeva was also included in Business Insider's 2017 list of the world's 50 most dominant athletes, ranked 14, and in the Forbes '30 under 30 Europe' list of 2017 as one of the most successful young people in Europe.

Medvedeva is sponsored by John Wilson, her Gold Seal blade manufacturer, Edea, her skating boot manufacturer, and Nike. In 2018, John Wilson presented her with custom 24K rose gold engraved blades designed by fellow figure skater Misha Ge. Her other endorsements include being named a brand ambassador for Pantene in 2018. In 2019, Medvedeva appeared in a TV advertisement for the Japanese game Magia Record: Puella Magi Madoka Magica Gaiden with Russian teammate Alina Zagitova. She has also made cooperations with Japanese brands Rivaland and Aniplex. In February 2021, Medvedeva became one of Ozon's ambassadors, also in March 2021, she became a Nestle brand ambassador. In April 2022, she appeared on the cover of the April issue of the men's magazine Maxim Russia.

== Records and achievements ==
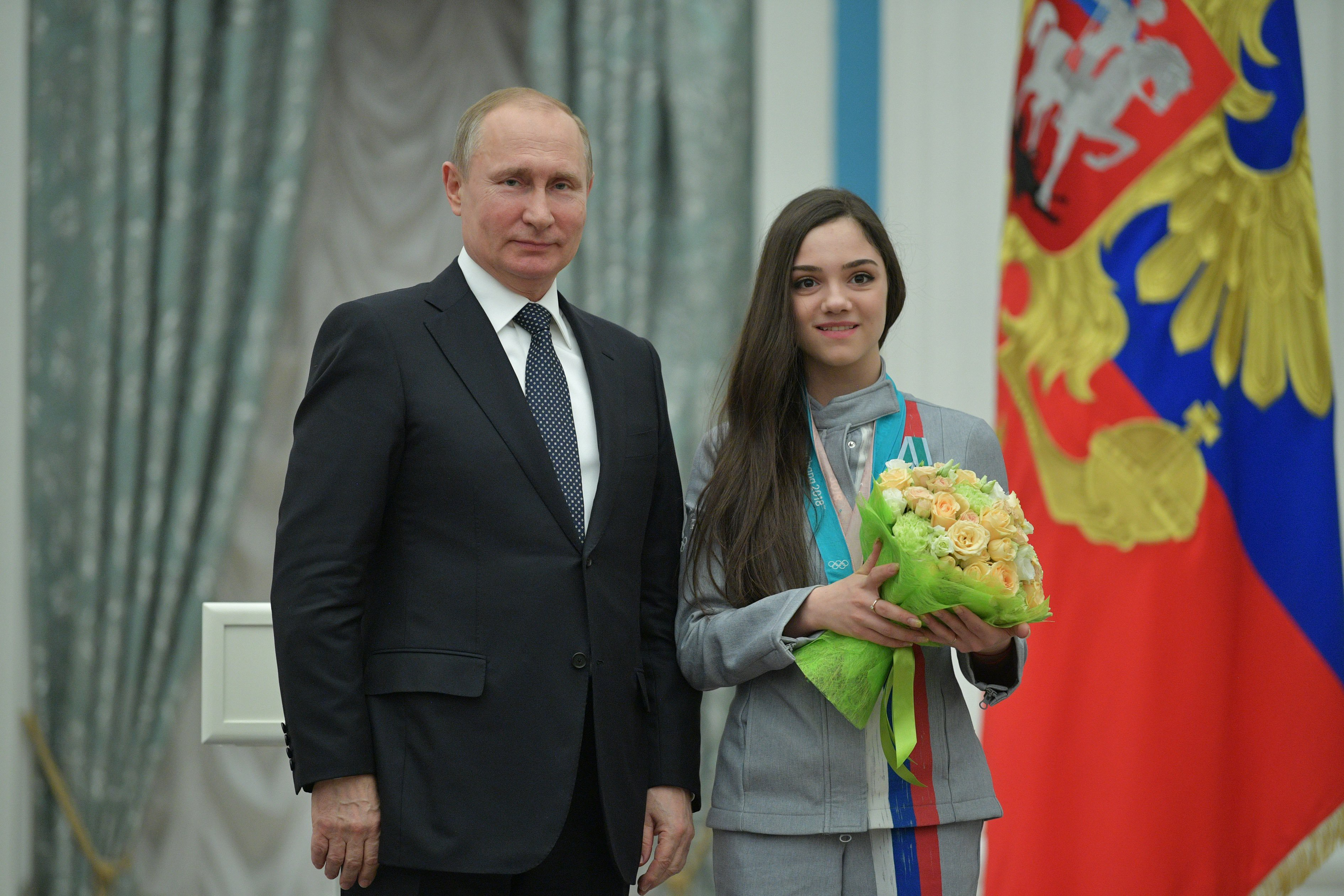
Vladimir Putin, the President of Russia, awarding Medvedeva the Order of Friendship in 2018

- First women's singles skater to win senior Worlds the year after winning Junior Worlds, having won gold at the 2015 World Junior Championships and then at the 2016 World Championships.

== List of Medvedeva's world record scores ==
=== Historical world record scores ===
Note: Because of the introduction of the new +5 / −5 GOE (Grade of Execution) system which replaced the previous +3 / -3 GOE system, ISU has decided that all statistics starts from zero starting from season 2018–19 and all previous statistics are historical.

Medvedeva had broken world records 13 times before season 2018–19.

Combined total records
| Date | Score | Event | Note |
|---|---|---|---|
| 22 April 2017 | 241.31 | 2017 World Team Trophy | Historical world record. Medvedeva became the first and remained the only woman to score above 240 points before season 2018–19. |
| 31 March 2017 | 233.41 | 2017 World Championships | Medvedeva became the first woman to score above 230 points. |
| 27 January 2017 | 229.71 | 2017 European Championships | Medvedeva broke Yuna Kim's record which had lasted since February 2010. |
Short program records
| Date | Score | Event | Note |
| 21 February 2018 | 81.61 | 2018 Winter Olympics | Historical world record. This record was broken by teammate Alina Zagitova twenty minutes later at the same event. |
| 11 February 2018 | 81.06 | 2018 Winter Olympics (Team event) | Note: This Team event result is not cited in the ISU data site. |
| 20 April 2017 | 80.85 | 2017 World Team Trophy | Medvedeva became the first woman to score above 80 points in short program. |
| 9 December 2016 | 79.21 | 2016–17 Grand Prix Final | Medvedeva broke Mao Asada's record which had lasted since March 2014. |
Free skating records
| Date | Score | Event | Note |
| 22 April 2017 | 160.46 | 2017 World Team Trophy | Historical world record. Medvedeva became the first and remained the only woman to score above 160 points before season 2018–19. |
| 31 March 2017 | 154.40 | 2017 World Championships | |
| 27 January 2017 | 150.79 | 2017 European Championships | |
| 2 April 2016 | 150.10 | 2016 World Championships | Medvedeva broke Yuna Kim's record which had lasted since February 2010. |
Junior women's short program records
| Date | Score | Event | Note |
| 7 March 2015 | 68.48 | 2015 World Junior Championships | |
| 13 December 2014 | 67.09 | 2014–15 Junior Grand Prix Final | |

=== List of Medvedeva's historical best scores ===
Best combined total scores
| All-time rank | Score | Event | Note |
|---|---|---|---|
| 1 | 241.31 | 2017 World Team Trophy | Historical best score. Medvedeva is the only lady who has ever scored above 240 points. She has scored thirteen times above 220 points, five times above 230 points and once above 240 points. Ten out of the fifteen best combined total scores of all time have been scored by Medvedeva. |
| (2) | (Alina Zagitova 239.57) | | Historical best score. Medvedeva is the only lady who has ever scored above 240 points. She has scored thirteen times above 220 points, five times above 230 points and once above 240 points. Ten out of the fifteen best combined total scores of all time have been scored by Medvedeva. |
| 3 | 238.26 | 2018 Winter Olympics | Historical best score. Medvedeva is the only lady who has ever scored above 240 points. She has scored thirteen times above 220 points, five times above 230 points and once above 240 points. Ten out of the fifteen best combined total scores of all time have been scored by Medvedeva. |
| (4) | (Alina Zagitova 238.24) | | Historical best score. Medvedeva is the only lady who has ever scored above 240 points. She has scored thirteen times above 220 points, five times above 230 points and once above 240 points. Ten out of the fifteen best combined total scores of all time have been scored by Medvedeva. |
| 5 | 233.41 | 2017 World Championships | Historical best score. Medvedeva is the only lady who has ever scored above 240 points. She has scored thirteen times above 220 points, five times above 230 points and once above 240 points. Ten out of the fifteen best combined total scores of all time have been scored by Medvedeva. |
| 6 | 232.86 | 2018 European Championships | Historical best score. Medvedeva is the only lady who has ever scored above 240 points. She has scored thirteen times above 220 points, five times above 230 points and once above 240 points. Ten out of the fifteen best combined total scores of all time have been scored by Medvedeva. |
| 7 | 231.21 | 2017 Rostelecom Cup | Historical best score. Medvedeva is the only lady who has ever scored above 240 points. She has scored thirteen times above 220 points, five times above 230 points and once above 240 points. Ten out of the fifteen best combined total scores of all time have been scored by Medvedeva. |
Best short program scores
| All-time rank | Score | Event | Note |
| (1) | (Alina Zagitova 82.92) | | Historical best score. Medvedeva has scored eleven times above 78 points and five times above 80 points in the short program. Nine out of the eleven best short program scores of all time have been scored by Medvedeva. She was the first woman who scored above 80 points in a short program at an international competition. |
| 2 | 81.61 | 2018 Winter Olympics | Historical best score. Medvedeva has scored eleven times above 78 points and five times above 80 points in the short program. Nine out of the eleven best short program scores of all time have been scored by Medvedeva. She was the first woman who scored above 80 points in a short program at an international competition. |
| 3 | 81.06 | 2018 Winter Olympics - Team event | Historical best score. Medvedeva has scored eleven times above 78 points and five times above 80 points in the short program. Nine out of the eleven best short program scores of all time have been scored by Medvedeva. She was the first woman who scored above 80 points in a short program at an international competition. |
| 4 | 80.85 | 2017 World Team Trophy | Historical best score. Medvedeva has scored eleven times above 78 points and five times above 80 points in the short program. Nine out of the eleven best short program scores of all time have been scored by Medvedeva. She was the first woman who scored above 80 points in a short program at an international competition. |
| 5 | 80.75 | 2017 Rostelecom Cup | Historical best score. Medvedeva has scored eleven times above 78 points and five times above 80 points in the short program. Nine out of the eleven best short program scores of all time have been scored by Medvedeva. She was the first woman who scored above 80 points in a short program at an international competition. |
| (6) | (Alina Zagitova and Carolina Kostner 80.27) | | Historical best score. Medvedeva has scored eleven times above 78 points and five times above 80 points in the short program. Nine out of the eleven best short program scores of all time have been scored by Medvedeva. She was the first woman who scored above 80 points in a short program at an international competition. |
| 8 | 80.00 | 2017 CS Ondrej Nepela Trophy | Historical best score. Medvedeva has scored eleven times above 78 points and five times above 80 points in the short program. Nine out of the eleven best short program scores of all time have been scored by Medvedeva. She was the first woman who scored above 80 points in a short program at an international competition. |
Best free skating scores
| All-time rank | Score | Event | Note |
| 1 | 160.46 | 2017 World Team Trophy | Historical best score. Medvedeva is the first woman to score above 160 points in free skating. She has scored ten times above 146 points in free skating. Seven times she has scored above 150 points and once above 160 points. Seven out of the twelve best free skating scores of all time have been scored by Medvedeva. |
| (2) | (Alina Zagitova 158.08) | | Historical best score. Medvedeva is the first woman to score above 160 points in free skating. She has scored ten times above 146 points in free skating. Seven times she has scored above 150 points and once above 160 points. Seven out of the twelve best free skating scores of all time have been scored by Medvedeva. |
| (3) | (Alina Zagitova 157.97) | | Historical best score. Medvedeva is the first woman to score above 160 points in free skating. She has scored ten times above 146 points in free skating. Seven times she has scored above 150 points and once above 160 points. Seven out of the twelve best free skating scores of all time have been scored by Medvedeva. |
| 4 | 156.65 | 2018 Winter Olympics | Historical best score. Medvedeva is the first woman to score above 160 points in free skating. She has scored ten times above 146 points in free skating. Seven times she has scored above 150 points and once above 160 points. Seven out of the twelve best free skating scores of all time have been scored by Medvedeva. |
| 4 | (Alina Zagitova 156.65) | | Historical best score. Medvedeva is the first woman to score above 160 points in free skating. She has scored ten times above 146 points in free skating. Seven times she has scored above 150 points and once above 160 points. Seven out of the twelve best free skating scores of all time have been scored by Medvedeva. |
| 6 | 154.40 | 2017 World Championships | Historical best score. Medvedeva is the first woman to score above 160 points in free skating. She has scored ten times above 146 points in free skating. Seven times she has scored above 150 points and once above 160 points. Seven out of the twelve best free skating scores of all time have been scored by Medvedeva. |
| 7 | 154.29 | 2018 European Championships | Historical best score. Medvedeva is the first woman to score above 160 points in free skating. She has scored ten times above 146 points in free skating. Seven times she has scored above 150 points and once above 160 points. Seven out of the twelve best free skating scores of all time have been scored by Medvedeva. |

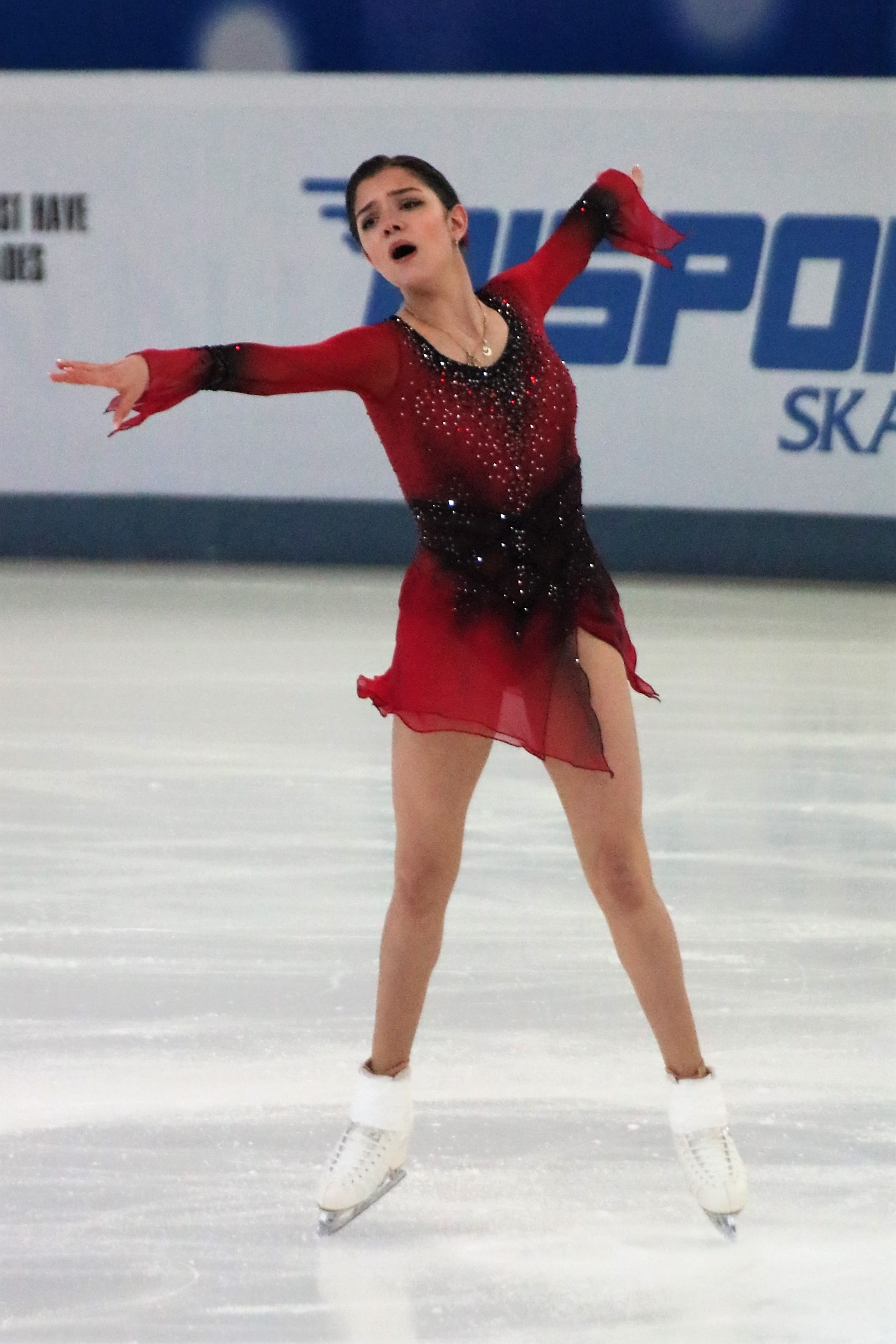
Medvedeva at the 2019 Russian Figure Skating Championships

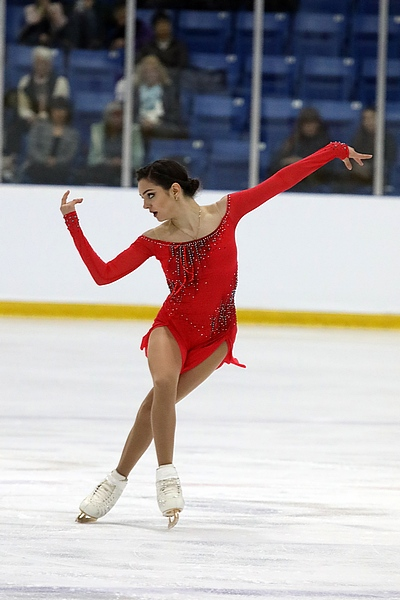
Medvedeva at the 2018 CS Autumn Classic

== Programs ==
=== Post-2021 ===
| Season | New Exhibition | Older Exhibition |
|---|---|---|
| 2025–2026 | My marmalade by Katya Lel choreo. by Evgenia Medvedeva; The Nutcracker by Pyotr Ilyich Tchaikovsky; Revelatory by Brian Tyler (from Now You See Me 2); Bride by Glukoza choreo. by Eteri Tutberidze and Daniil Gleichengauz | Life by Ludovico Einaudi choreo. by Anastasia Skoptsova; A Little Song About Bears by Aida Vedishcheva (from Kidnapping, Caucasian Style); Anna Karenina by Dario Marianelli choreo. by Daniil Gleichengauz |
| 2024–2025 | Ray of golden sun by Muslim Magomayev performed by Basta, MONA, Tri dnya dozhdya & Vladimir Presnyakov; Il treno del destino by Igor Krutoy performed by Sumi Jo; Humans will survive by Zivert; A word about love by Eduard Asadov (poem) performed by Ilanda Dzhikirba; Earthquake by Hayko performed by Edgar Akobyan; A Little Song About Bears by Aida Vedishcheva (from Kidnapping, Caucasian Style); Be Yourself by Denis Ten choreo. by Evgenia Medvedeva; Mama by Anzhelika Varum performed by Evgenia Ryabtseva | Memoirs of a Geisha by John Williams choreo. by Shae-Lynn Bourne; Anna Karenina by Dario Marianelli choreo. by Daniil Gleichengauz; Sailor Moon choreo. by Daniil Gleichengauz; Extremely Loud and Incredibly Close by Alexandre Desplat choreo. by Daniil Gleichengauz and Ilia Averbukh; River Flows in You by Yiruma choreo. by Ilia Averbukh; W.E. by Abel Korzeniowski choreo. by Ilia Averbukh and Igor Strelkin; Life by Ludovico Einaudi choreo. by Anastasia Skoptsova |
| 2023–2024 | Vocalise Op. 34., No. 14. by Sergei Rachmaninov performed by Aida Garifullina; Ellipses by Zivert; Fly, fly by Philipp Kirkorov; The Nutcracker by Pyotr Ilyich Tchaikovsky; Life by Ludovico Einaudi choreo. by Anastasia Skoptsova | High by Mia Boyka choreo. by Ilia Averbukh; Alegría (from Cirque du Soleil) by René Dupéré; Carmen by Georges Bizet |
| 2022–2023 | I'm waiting for spring by Anna German choreo. by Ilia Averbukh; High by Mia Boyka choreo. by Ilia Averbukh | Your Love by Dimash Qudaibergen; Grazie by Sardor Milano performed by Hibla Gerzmava; Carmen by Georges Bizet |
| 2021–2022 | Grazie by Sardor Milano performed by Hibla Gerzmava choreo. by Ilia Averbukh; Carmen by Georges Bizet; Your Love by Dimash Qudaibergen | Alegría (from Cirque du Soleil) by René Dupéré choreo. by Shae-Lynn Bourne; Memoirs of a Geisha by John Williams choreo. by Shae-Lynn Bourne |

=== Pre-2021 ===
Competition and exhibition programs by season
| Season | Short program | Free skate program | Exhibition program |
|---|---|---|---|
| 2009–10 | Beethoven: 1. Für Elise; 2. Moonlight Sonata; Composed by Ludwig van Beethoven; Choreo. by Eteri Tutberidze | Memory (Cats song): From Cats (musical); Composed by Andrew Lloyd Webber; Choreo. by Eteri Tutberidze | —N/a |
| 2010–11 | Charlie Chaplin Medley: 1. Limelight; Composed by Charlie Chaplin; 2. Je cherche après Titine; From Modern Times; Choreo. by Eteri Tutberidze | Russian Folk Medley: 1. Tsyganochka (Russian: Цыганочка); 2. Ekh raz, eshche raz (Russian: Эх раз, ещё раз); Choreo. by Eteri Tutberidze | —N/a |
| 2011–12 | "Rich Man's Frug": Composed by Cy Coleman; Choreo. by Eteri Tutberidze | Music by Eugen Doga: 1. "Na Katere"; 2. "Gramofon"; Composed by Eugen Doga; Choreo. by Eteri Tutberidze | —N/a |
| 2012–13 | "Ballet Ruse": Composed by Frank Mills; Choreo. by Eteri Tutberidze | Music by Eugen Doga: Choreo. by Eteri Tutberidze | —N/a |
| 2013–14 | James Bond Theme: Composed by Monty Norman; Choreo. by Eteri Tutberidze | Medley: 1. "Nocturne"; From La Califfa; Composed by Ennio Morricone; 2. "Never Gonna Miss You"; Composed by Various Artists; Choreo. by Eteri Tutberidze | Russian Gypsy Music |
| 2014–15 | The Umbrellas of Cherbourg Soundtrack (Les Parapluies de Cherbourg): Composed by Michel Legrand; Choreo. by Eteri Tutberidze | Medley: 1. "Ein Sommernachtstraum"; Composed by Hans Günter Wagener; 2. "Tango Tschak"; Composed by Hugues Le Bars; Choreo. by Eteri Tutberidze | "Non, je ne regrette rien": Composed by Charles Dumont; Performed by Édith Piaf |
| 2014–15 | The Umbrellas of Cherbourg Soundtrack (Les Parapluies de Cherbourg): Composed by Michel Legrand; Choreo. by Eteri Tutberidze | Medley: 1. "Ein Sommernachtstraum"; Composed by Hans Günter Wagener; 2. "Tango Tschak"; Composed by Hugues Le Bars; Choreo. by Eteri Tutberidze | "Stayin' Alive": From Saturday Night Fever; Performed by Bee Gees |
| 2015–16 | "Melodies of the White Night": From Melodies of a White Night; Composed by Isaac Schwartz; Choreo. by Alexander Zhulin | Medley: 1. "Dance for Me Wallis"; 2. "Charms"; From W.E.; Composed by Abel Korzeniowski; 3. "Allegro"; Composed by René Aubry; Choreo. by Ilia Averbukh and Igor Strelkin | "Stayin' Alive": Performed by Bee Gees |
| 2015–16 | "Melodies of the White Night": From Melodies of a White Night; Composed by Isaac Schwartz; Choreo. by Alexander Zhulin | Medley: 1. "Dance for Me Wallis"; 2. "Charms"; From W.E.; Composed by Abel Korzeniowski; 3. "Allegro"; Composed by René Aubry; Choreo. by Ilia Averbukh and Igor Strelkin | "You Raise Me Up": Composed by Rolf Løvland; Performed by Celtic Woman |
| 2015–16 | "Melodies of the White Night": From Melodies of a White Night; Composed by Isaac Schwartz; Choreo. by Alexander Zhulin | Medley: 1. "Dance for Me Wallis"; 2. "Charms"; From W.E.; Composed by Abel Korzeniowski; 3. "Allegro"; Composed by René Aubry; Choreo. by Ilia Averbukh and Igor Strelkin | Medley: 1. "Tore My Heart"; Performed by Oona Garthwaite; 2. "Rama Lama (Bang Bang)"; Performed by Róisín Murphy |
| 2015–16 | "Melodies of the White Night": From Melodies of a White Night; Composed by Isaac Schwartz; Choreo. by Alexander Zhulin | Medley: 1. "Dance for Me Wallis"; 2. "Charms"; From W.E.; Composed by Abel Korzeniowski; 3. "Allegro"; Composed by René Aubry; Choreo. by Ilia Averbukh and Igor Strelkin | Ostanus: Performed by Gorod 312 |
| 2016–17 | Medley: 1. "River Flows in You"; Composed by Yiruma; 2. "The Winter"; Composed by Balmorhea; Choreo. by Eteri Tutberidze | 9/11 Medley: 1. "Extremely Loud and Incredibly Close"; 2. "Piano Lesson with Grandma"; From Extremely Loud & Incredibly Close; Composed by Alexandre Desplat; 3. "Flying"; Composed by Dan Cullen; Choreo. by Ilia Averbukh and Daniil Gleikhengauz | "Moonlight Densetsu": From the anime Sailor Moon; Choreo. by Daniil Gleikhengauz |
| 2016–17 | Medley: 1. "River Flows in You"; Composed by Yiruma; 2. "The Winter"; Composed by Balmorhea; Choreo. by Eteri Tutberidze | 9/11 Medley: 1. "Extremely Loud and Incredibly Close"; 2. "Piano Lesson with Grandma"; From Extremely Loud & Incredibly Close; Composed by Alexandre Desplat; 3. "Flying"; Composed by Dan Cullen; Choreo. by Ilia Averbukh and Daniil Gleikhengauz | "Vogue": Performed by Madonna; Choreo. by Daniil Gleikhengauz |
| 2016–17 | Medley: 1. "River Flows in You"; Composed by Yiruma; 2. "The Winter"; Composed by Balmorhea; Choreo. by Eteri Tutberidze | 9/11 Medley: 1. "Extremely Loud and Incredibly Close"; 2. "Piano Lesson with Grandma"; From Extremely Loud & Incredibly Close; Composed by Alexandre Desplat; 3. "Flying"; Composed by Dan Cullen; Choreo. by Ilia Averbukh and Daniil Gleikhengauz | "Mamarl": Performed by Patax; Choreo. by David Wilson |
| 2016–17 | Medley: 1. "River Flows in You"; Composed by Yiruma; 2. "The Winter"; Composed by Balmorhea; Choreo. by Eteri Tutberidze | 9/11 Medley: 1. "Extremely Loud and Incredibly Close"; 2. "Piano Lesson with Grandma"; From Extremely Loud & Incredibly Close; Composed by Alexandre Desplat; 3. "Flying"; Composed by Dan Cullen; Choreo. by Ilia Averbukh and Daniil Gleikhengauz | "Meditation" (Thaïs): Composed by Jules Massenet; Performed by Vladimir Spivakov and Sergei Bezrodny |
| 2016–17 | Medley: 1. "River Flows in You"; Composed by Yiruma; 2. "The Winter"; Composed by Balmorhea; Choreo. by Eteri Tutberidze | 9/11 Medley: 1. "Extremely Loud and Incredibly Close"; 2. "Piano Lesson with Grandma"; From Extremely Loud & Incredibly Close; Composed by Alexandre Desplat; 3. "Flying"; Composed by Dan Cullen; Choreo. by Ilia Averbukh and Daniil Gleikhengauz | Medley: 1. "Paroles, paroles"; Composed by Gianni Ferrio; Performed by Dalida and Alain Delon; 2. "Moi je joue"; Performed by Brigitte Bardot; Choreo. by Daniil Gleikhengauz |
| 2017–18 | Nocturne in C-sharp minor, Op. posth. (Chopin): Composed by Frédéric Chopin; Performed by Joshua Bell; Choreo. by Ilia Averbukh | Medley: 1. "The Departure (Lullaby)"; 2. "Dona Nobis Pacem 2"; From The Leftovers; Composed by Max Richter; 3. "Divenire"; Composed by Ludovico Einaudi; 4. "January Stars"; Composed by George Winston | Anna Karenina: Composed by Dario Marianelli; Choreo. by Daniil Gleikhengauz |
| 2017–18 | Nocturne in C-sharp minor, Op. posth. (Chopin): Composed by Frédéric Chopin; Performed by Joshua Bell; Choreo. by Ilia Averbukh | Medley: 1. "The Departure (Lullaby)"; 2. "Dona Nobis Pacem 2"; From The Leftovers; Composed by Max Richter; 3. "Divenire"; Composed by Ludovico Einaudi; 4. "January Stars"; Composed by George Winston | "Meditation" (Thaïs): Composed by Jules Massenet; Performed by Vladimir Spivakov and Sergei Bezrodny |
| 2017–18 | Nocturne in C-sharp minor, Op. posth. (Chopin): Composed by Frédéric Chopin; Performed by Joshua Bell; Choreo. by Ilia Averbukh | Anna Karenina: From Anna Karenina; Composed by Dario Marianelli; Choreo. by Daniil Gleikhengauz; Tracks used: 1. Overture; 2. Dance with Me; 3. I Understood Something; 4. Too Late | "Beautiful": Composed by Linda Perry; Performed by Christina Aguilera |
| 2017–18 | Nocturne in C-sharp minor, Op. posth. (Chopin): Composed by Frédéric Chopin; Performed by Joshua Bell; Choreo. by Ilia Averbukh | Anna Karenina: From Anna Karenina; Composed by Dario Marianelli; Choreo. by Daniil Gleikhengauz; Tracks used: 1. Overture; 2. Dance with Me; 3. I Understood Something; 4. Too Late | "Experience": Composed by Ludovico Einaudi; Choreo. by Medvedeva |
| 2017–18 | Nocturne in C-sharp minor, Op. posth. (Chopin): Composed by Frédéric Chopin; Performed by Joshua Bell; Choreo. by Ilia Averbukh | Anna Karenina: From Anna Karenina; Composed by Dario Marianelli; Choreo. by Daniil Gleikhengauz; Tracks used: 1. Overture; 2. Dance with Me; 3. I Understood Something; 4. Too Late | "Cuckoo": From Battle for Sevastopol; Composed by Viktor Tsoi; Performed by Polina Gagarina; Choreo. by Eteri Tutberidze |
| 2018–19 | "E lucevan le stelle": From Tosca; Composed by Giacomo Puccini; Choreo. by Misha Ge | Astor Piazzolla Medley: 1. "Mumuki"; 2. "Regreso al amor"; From Sur; 3. Libertango; Composed by Astor Piazzolla; Performed by Yo-Yo Ma; Choreo. by David Wilson | "The Windmills of Your Mind": Composed by Michel Legrand; Performed by All Angels |
| 2018–19 | "E lucevan le stelle": From Tosca; Composed by Giacomo Puccini; Choreo. by Misha Ge | Astor Piazzolla Medley: 1. "Mumuki"; 2. "Regreso al amor"; From Sur; 3. Libertango; Composed by Astor Piazzolla; Performed by Yo-Yo Ma; Choreo. by David Wilson | "Beautiful Mess": Performed by Kristian Kostov; Choreo. by Medvedeva |
| 2018–19 | "E lucevan le stelle": From Tosca; Composed by Giacomo Puccini; Choreo. by Misha Ge | Astor Piazzolla Medley: 1. "Mumuki"; 2. "Regreso al amor"; From Sur; 3. Libertango; Composed by Astor Piazzolla; Performed by Yo-Yo Ma; Choreo. by David Wilson | "Experience": Composed by Ludovico Einaudi; Choreo. by Medvedeva |
| 2018–19 | "Orange Colored Sky": Performed by Natalie Cole; Choreo. by David Wilson, Sandra Bezic | Astor Piazzolla Medley: Composed by Astor Piazzolla; Performed by Yo-Yo Ma; Choreo. by David Wilson | "7 Rings": Performed by Ariana Grande; Choreo. by Misha Ge |
| 2018–19 | "Orange Colored Sky": Performed by Natalie Cole; Choreo. by David Wilson, Sandra Bezic | Astor Piazzolla Medley: Composed by Astor Piazzolla; Performed by Yo-Yo Ma; Choreo. by David Wilson | "Million Roses" (Миллион роз): Composed by Raimonds Pauls; Performed by Alla Pugacheva; Choreo. by Shae-Lynn Bourne |
| 2018–19 | "Orange Colored Sky": Performed by Natalie Cole; Choreo. by David Wilson, Sandra Bezic | Astor Piazzolla Medley: Composed by Astor Piazzolla; Performed by Yo-Yo Ma; Choreo. by David Wilson | "Faith": Performed by May J.; Choreo. by Stéphane Lambiel |
| 2019–20 | "Exogenesis: Symphony Part 3 (Redemption)": Composed by Muse; Choreo. by Ilia Averbukh and Jeffrey Buttle | Memoirs of a Geisha: From Memoirs of a Geisha; Composed by John Williams; Choreo. by Shae-Lynn Bourne; Tracks used: 1. The Chairman's Waltz; 2. Going to School; 3. Sayuri's Theme; 4. Becoming a Geisha | "Beautiful Mess": Performed by Kristian Kostov; Choreo. by Medvedeva |
| 2019–20 | "Exogenesis: Symphony Part 3 (Redemption)": Composed by Muse; Choreo. by Ilia Averbukh and Jeffrey Buttle | Memoirs of a Geisha: From Memoirs of a Geisha; Composed by John Williams; Choreo. by Shae-Lynn Bourne; Tracks used: 1. The Chairman's Waltz; 2. Going to School; 3. Sayuri's Theme; 4. Becoming a Geisha | "The Windmills of Your Mind": Composed by Michel Legrand; Performed by All Angels |
| 2019–20 | "Exogenesis: Symphony Part 3 (Redemption)": Composed by Muse; Choreo. by Ilia Averbukh and Jeffrey Buttle | Memoirs of a Geisha: From Memoirs of a Geisha; Composed by John Williams; Choreo. by Shae-Lynn Bourne; Tracks used: 1. The Chairman's Waltz; 2. Going to School; 3. Sayuri's Theme; 4. Becoming a Geisha | "Idontwannabeyouanymore": Performed by Billie Eilish; Choreo. by Joey Russell |
| 2020–21 | Masquerade: Composed by Aram Khachaturian; Choreo. by Jeffrey Buttle | Alegría Medley: From Cirque du Soleil; Composed by René Dupéré; Choreo. by Shae-Lynn Bourne; Tracks used: 1. "Vai Vedrai"; 2. "Alegría"; 3. "Jeux d'enfants" | "Kometa": Performed by JONY; Choreo. by Ilia Averbukh |
| 2020–21 | Masquerade: Composed by Aram Khachaturian; Choreo. by Jeffrey Buttle | Alegría Medley: From Cirque du Soleil; Composed by René Dupéré; Choreo. by Shae-Lynn Bourne; Tracks used: 1. "Vai Vedrai"; 2. "Alegría"; 3. "Jeux d'enfants" | "Echo of Love": Performed by Anna German; Choreo. by Eteri Tutberidze |

== Competitive highlights ==
External videos
- Evgenia short program performance at the 2018 Olympic Games in PyeongChang
- Evgenia free skate performance at the 2018 Olympic Games in PyeongChang

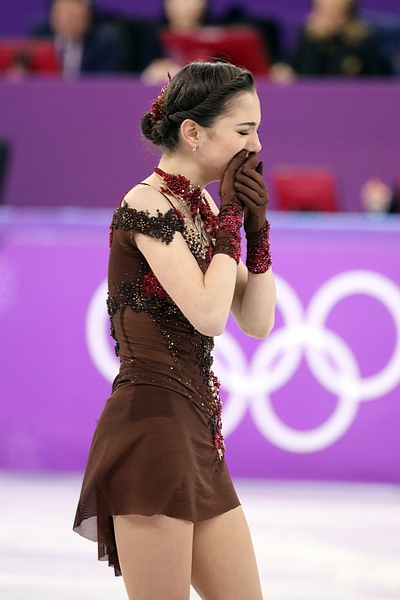
Medvedeva at the 2018 Winter Olympics

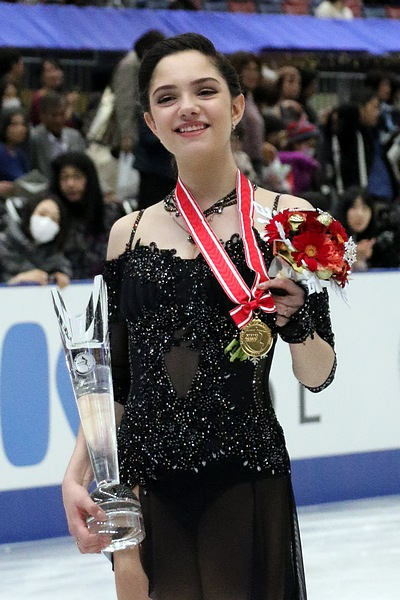
Medevdeva at the 2017 NHK Trophy

- GP – Event of the ISU Grand Prix Series
- JGP – Event of the ISU Junior Grand Prix Series
- CS – Event of the ISU Challenger Series
- C – Event was cancelled
- WD – Withdrew from competition
- Medals at team events are awarded for the team results only. Individual placements at team event are listed in parentheses.

Competition placements at senior level
| Season | 2011-12 | 2012-13 | 2013-14 | 2014-15 | 2015-16 | 2016-17 | 2017-18 | 2018-19 | 2019-20 | 2020-21 |
|---|---|---|---|---|---|---|---|---|---|---|
| Winter Olympics | | | | | | | 2nd | | | |
| Winter Olympics (Team Event) | | | | | | | 2nd | | | |
| World Championships | | | | | 1st | 1st | WD | 3rd | | |
| European Championships | | | | | 1st | 1st | 2nd | | | |
| GP Final | | | | | 1st | 1st | WD | | | |
| GP Skate America | | | | | 1st | | | | | |
| GP Skate Canada | | | | | | 1st | | 3rd | 5th | |
| GP France | | | | | | 1st | | 4th | | |
| GP Rostelecom Cup | | | | | 2nd | | 1st | | 2nd | WD |
| GP NHK Trophy | | | | | | | 1st | | | |
| CS Autumn Classic | | | | | | | | 2nd | 2nd | |
| CS Ondrej Nepela Memorial | | | | | 1st | | 1st | | | |
| Shanghai Trophy | | | | | | | | | 1st | |
| Russian Championships | 8th | | 7th | 3rd | 1st | 1st | WD | 7th | WD | WD |
| Russian Cup Final | | | 2nd | | | | | 1st | | |
| World Team Trophy | | | | | | 2nd (1st) | | | | |
| Team Challenge Cup | | | | | 2nd (1st) | | | | | |
| Japan Open | | | | | | 2nd (1st) | 1st (1st) | | | |

Competition placements at junior level
| Season | 2010-11 | 2011-12 | 2012-13 | 2013-14 | 2014-15 |
|---|---|---|---|---|---|
| Junior Worlds | | | | 3rd | 1st |
| JGP Final | | | | 3rd | 1st |
| JGP Czech Republic | | | | | 1st |
| JGP France | | | | | 1st |
| JGP Latvia | | | | 1st | |
| JGP Poland | | | | 1st | |
| Ice Star | | | | 1st | |
| Russian Junior Championships | 12th | 6th | 4th | 4th | 1st |
| Russian Cup Final (Junior) | 2nd | 2nd | | | |

== Detailed results ==
- Small medals for the short program and free skating are only awarded at ISU Championships.
- Medals at team events are awarded for the team results only. Individual placements at team events are listed in parentheses.

=== Senior level ===
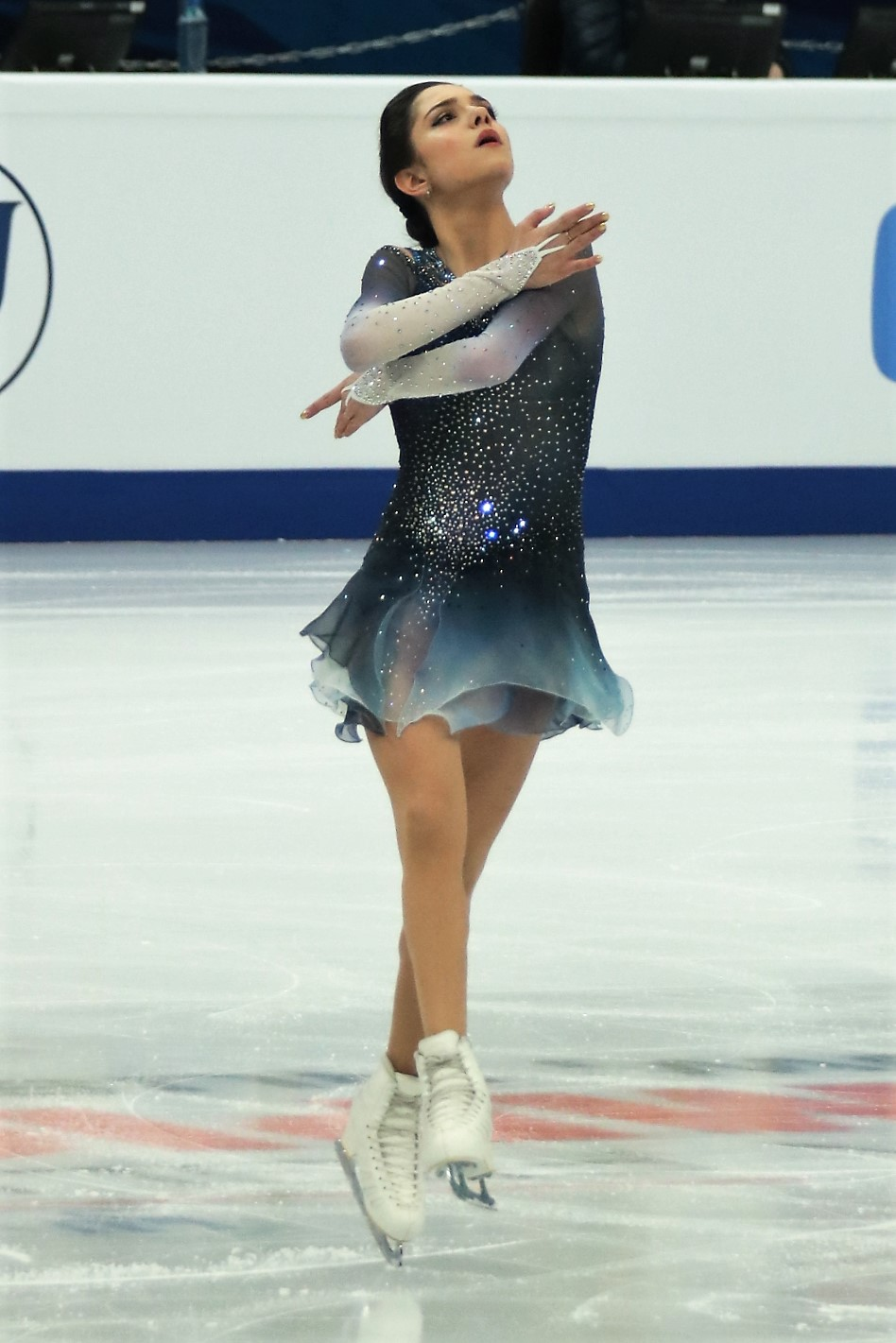
Medvedeva at the 2018 European Championships

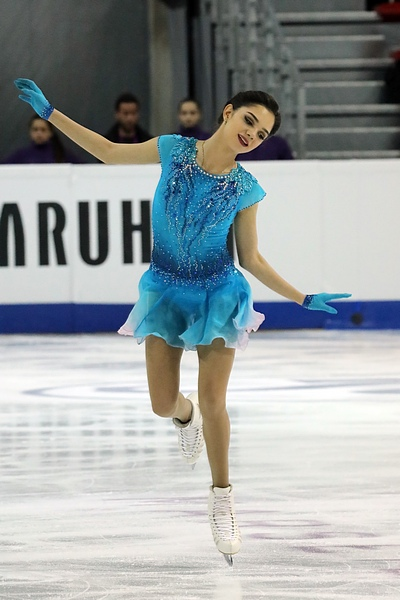
Medevdeva at the 2016–17 Grand Prix of Figure Skating Final

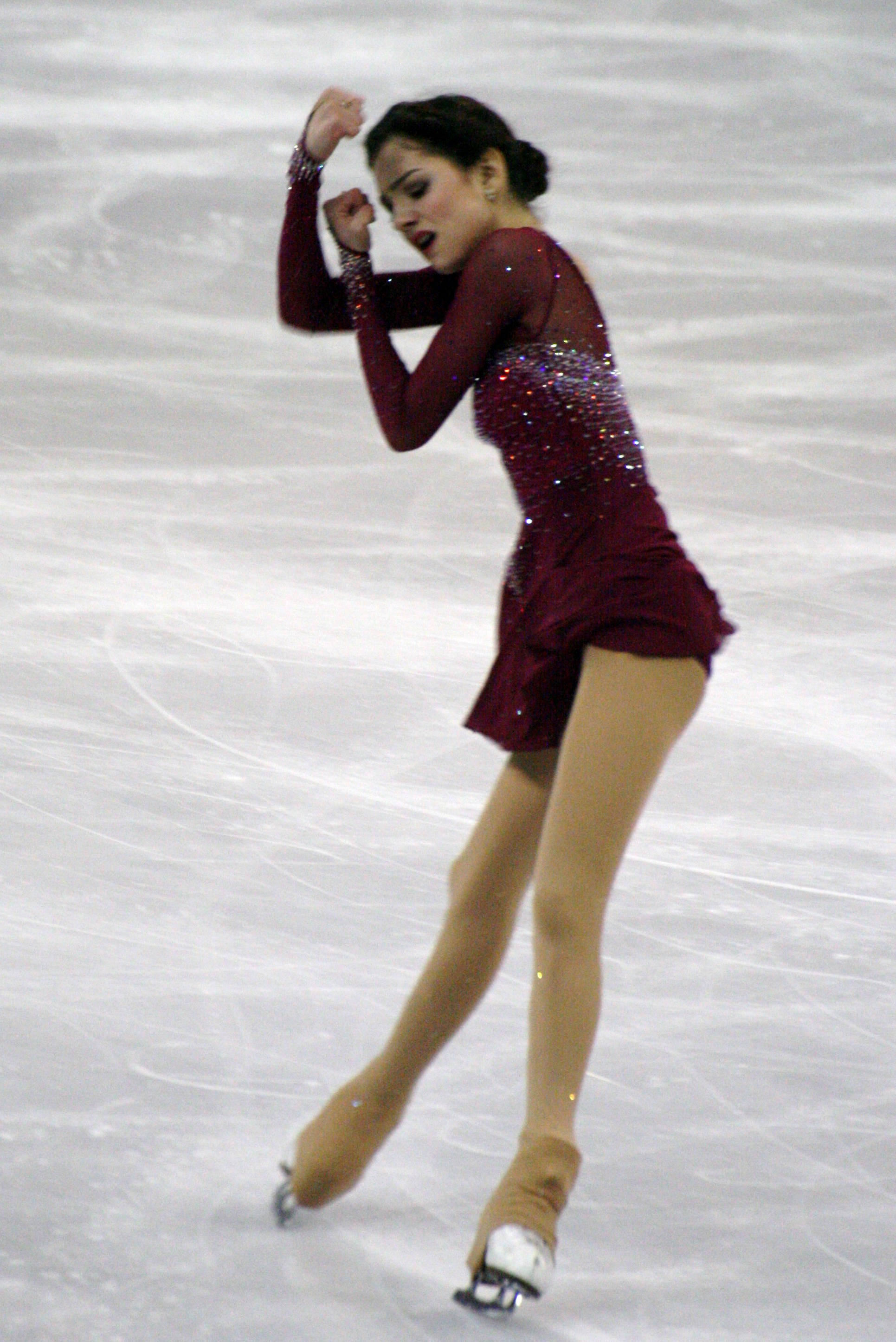
Medvedeva at the 2015–16 Grand Prix Final

Results in the 2011–12 season
| Date | Event | SP | | FS | | Total | |
| Date | Event | P | Score | P | Score | P | Score |
|---|---|---|---|---|---|---|---|
| 24—28 Dec 2011 | (Russia) 2012 Russian Championships | 11 | 53.21 | 8 | 108.53 | 8 | 161.74 |

Results in the 2013–14 season
| Date | Event | SP | | FS | | Total | |
| Date | Event | P | Score | P | Score | P | Score |
|---|---|---|---|---|---|---|---|
| 24—28 Dec 2013 | (Russia) 2014 Russian Championships | 8 | 62.19 | 8 | 119.67 | 7 | 181.86 |
| 26 Feb—2 Mar 2014 | (Russia) 2014 Russian Cup Final | 2 | 66.05 | 2 | 124.52 | 2 | 190.57 |

Results in the 2014–15 season
| Date | Event | SP | | FS | | Total | |
| Date | Event | P | Score | P | Score | P | Score |
|---|---|---|---|---|---|---|---|
| 6—10 Oct 2014 | (Russia) 2014 Russian Cup Stage 2 | 1 | 68.46 | 1 | 129.49 | 1 | 197.95 |
| 18—22 Nov 2014 | (Russia) 2014 Russian Cup Stage 4 | 1 | 67.79 | 2 | 134.84 | 2 | 204.64 |
| 24—28 Dec 2014 | (Russia) 2015 Russian Championships | 3 | 72.57 | 3 | 137.24 | 3 | 209.81 |

Results in the 2015–16 season
| Date | Event | SP | | FS | | Total | |
| Date | Event | P | Score | P | Score | P | Score |
|---|---|---|---|---|---|---|---|
| 1—3 Oct 2015 | (Slovakia) 2015 CS Ondrej Nepela Trophy | 1 | 63.68 | 2 | 120.26 | 1 | 183.94 |
| 23—25 Oct 2015 | (United States) 2015 Skate America | 1 | 70.92 | 2 | 135.09 | 1 | 206.01 |
| 20—22 Nov 2015 | (Russia) 2015 Rostelecom Cup | 3 | 67.03 | 1 | 139.73 | 2 | 206.76 |
| 10—13 Dec 2015 | (Spain) 2015–16 Grand Prix Final | 1 | 74.58 | 1 | 147.96 | 1 | 222.54 |
| 23—27 Dec 2015 | (Russia) 2016 Russian Championships | 1 | 79.44 | 1 | 155.44 | 1 | 234.88 |
| 26—31 Jan 2016 | (Slovakia) 2016 European Championships | 1 | 72.55 | 1 | 145.9 | 1 | 215.45 |
| 28 Mar—3 Apr 2016 | (United States) 2016 World Championships | 3 | 73.76 | 1 | 150.1 | 1 | 223.86 |
| 22—24 Apr 2016 | (United States) 2016 Team Challenge Cup | 1 | 77.56 | 1 | 151.55 | 2 (1) | 229.11 |

Results in the 2016–17 season
| Date | Event | SP | | FS | | Total | |
| Date | Event | P | Score | P | Score | P | Score |
|---|---|---|---|---|---|---|---|
| 1 Oct 2016 | 2016 Japan Open | | | 1 | 147.07 | 2 (1) | |
| 28—30 Oct 2016 | 2016 Skate Canada International | 1 | 76.24 | 1 | 144.41 | 1 | 220.61 |
| 11—13 Nov 2016 | 2016 Trophée de France | 1 | 78.52 | 1 | 143.02 | 1 | 221.54 |
| 8—11 Dec 2016 | (France) 2016–17 Grand Prix Final | 1 | 79.21 | 1 | 148.45 | 1 | 227.66 |
| 20—26 Dec 2016 | (Russia) 2017 Russian Championships | 1 | 80.08 | 1 | 153.49 | 1 | 233.57 |
| 25—29 Jan 2017 | (Czech Republic) 2017 European Championships | 1 | 78.92 | 1 | 150.79 | 1 | 229.71 |
| 29 Mar—2 Apr 2017 | (Finland) 2017 World Championships | 1 | 79.01 | 1 | 150.4 | 1 | 233.41 |
| 20—23 Apr 2017 | (Japan) 2017 World Team Trophy | 1 | 80.85 | 1 | 160.46 | 2 (1) | 241.31 |

Results in the 2017–18 season
| Date | Event | SP | | FS | | Total | |
| Date | Event | P | Score | P | Score | P | Score |
|---|---|---|---|---|---|---|---|
| 21—23 Sep 2017 | (Slovakia) 2017 CS Ondrej Nepela Trophy | 1 | 80 | 1 | 146.72 | 1 | 226.72 |
| 7 Oct 2017 | 2017 Japan Open | - | - | 1 | 152.08 | 2 (1) | - |
| 20—22 Oct 2017 | (Russia) 2017 Rostelecom Cup | 1 | 80.75 | 1 | 150.46 | 1 | 231.21 |
| 10—12 Nov 2017 | (Japan) 2017 NHK Trophy | 1 | 79.99 | 1 | 144.4 | 1 | 224.39 |
| 15—21 Jan 2018 | (Russia) 2018 European Championships | 2 | 78.57 | 2 | 154.29 | 2 | 232.86 |
| 9—12 Feb 2018 | (South Korea) 2018 Winter Olympics (Team Event) | 1 | 81.06 | - | - | 2 | - |
| 14—25 Feb 2018 | (South Korea) 2018 Winter Olympics | 2 | 81.61 | 1 | 156.65 | 2 | 238.26 |

Results in the 2018–19 season
| Date | Event | SP | | FS | | Total | |
| Date | Event | P | Score | P | Score | P | Score |
|---|---|---|---|---|---|---|---|
| 20—22 Sep 2018 | (Canada) 2018 CS Autumn Classic International | 1 | 70.98 | 2 | 133.91 | 2 | 204.89 |
| 26—28 Oct 2018 | 2018 Skate Canada International | 7 | 60.83 | 1 | 137.08 | 3 | 197.91 |
| 23—25 Nov 2018 | 2018 Internationaux de France | 3 | 67.55 | 5 | 125.26 | 4 | 192.81 |
| 19—23 Dec 2018 | (Russia) 2019 Russian Championships | 14 | 62.24 | 4 | 143.66 | 7 | 205.9 |
| 18—22 Feb 2019 | (Russia) 2019 Russian Cup Final | 1 | 76.89 | 2 | 146.01 | 1 | 222.9 |
| 18—24 Mar 2019 | (Japan) 2019 World Championships | 4 | 74.23 | 3 | 149.57 | 3 | 223.8 |

Results in the 2019–20 season
| Date | Event | SP | | FS | | Total | |
| Date | Event | P | Score | P | Score | P | Score |
|---|---|---|---|---|---|---|---|
| 14—19 Sep 2019 | (Canada) 2019 CS Autumn Classic International | 2 | 75.14 | 2 | 142.29 | 2 | 217.43 |
| 3—5 Oct 2019 | (China) 2019 Shanghai Trophy | 1 | 72.16 | 2 | 119.62 | 1 | 191.78 |
| 25—27 Oct 2019 | 2019 Skate Canada International | 6 | 62.89 | 3 | 146.73 | 5 | 206.62 |
| 15—17 Nov 2019 | (Russia) 2019 Rostelecom Cup | 1 | 76.93 | 2 | 148.83 | 2 | 225.76 |
| 24—29 Dec 2019 | (Russia) 2019 Russian Championships | 5 | 71.08 | WD | - | WD | - |

=== Junior level ===
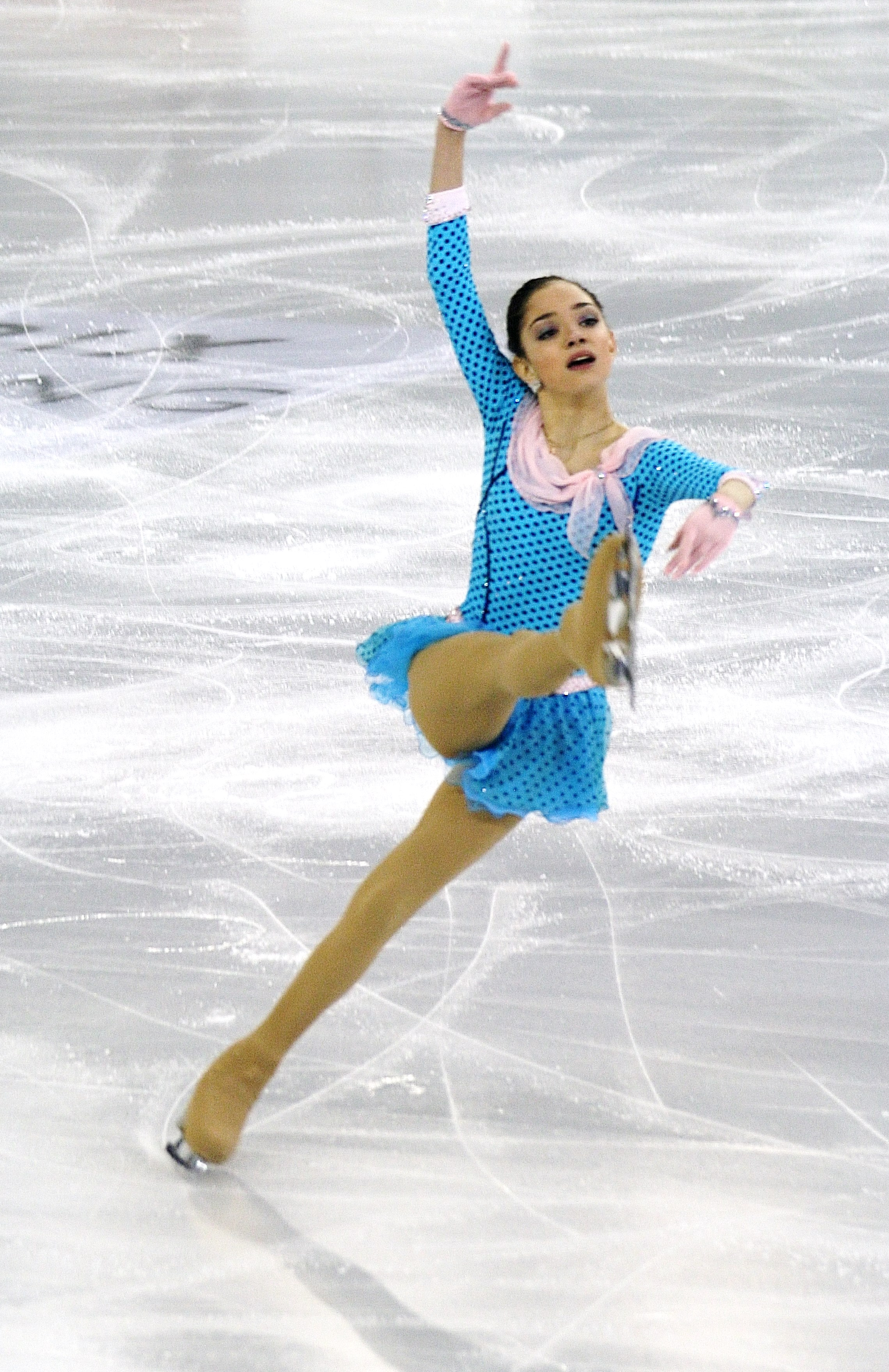
Medvedeva at the 2014–15 JGP Final

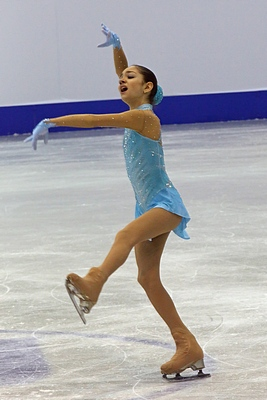
Evgenia Medvedeva at the Junior World Championships

Results in the 2010-11 season
| Date | Event | SP | | FS | | Total | |
| Date | Event | P | Score | P | Score | P | Score |
|---|---|---|---|---|---|---|---|
| 2—4 Feb 2011 | (Russia) 2011 Russian Junior Championships | 13 | 42.57 | 12 | 88.93 | 12 | 131.5 |

Results in the 2011–12 season
| Date | Event | SP | | FS | | Total | |
| Date | Event | P | Score | P | Score | P | Score |
|---|---|---|---|---|---|---|---|
| 5—7 Feb 2012 | (Russia) 2012 Russian Junior Championships | 7 | 54.86 | 7 | 103.64 | 6 | 158.5 |

Results in the 2012–13 season
| Date | Event | SP | | FS | | Total | |
| Date | Event | P | Score | P | Score | P | Score |
|---|---|---|---|---|---|---|---|
| 2—3 Feb 2013 | (Russia) 2013 Russian Junior Championships | 5 | 61.35 | 4 | 118.84 | 4 | 180.19 |

Results in the 2013–14 season
| Date | Event | SP | | FS | | Total | |
| Date | Event | P | Score | P | Score | P | Score |
|---|---|---|---|---|---|---|---|
| 29—31 Aug 2013 | 2013 JGP Latvia | 3 | 55.17 | 1 | 114.35 | 1 | 169.52 |
| 19—21 Sep 2013 | 2013 JGP Poland | 1 | 61.61 | 1 | 118.35 | 1 | 179.96 |
| 18—20 Oct 2013 | (Belarus) 2013 Ice Star | 1 | 62.12 | 1 | 118.01 | 1 | 180.13 |
| 5—6 Dec 2013 | (Japan) 2013–14 JGP Final | 3 | 58.75 | 5 | 104.93 | 3 | 163.68 |
| 22—25 Jan 2014 | (Russia) 2014 Russian Junior Championships | 4 | 63.25 | 4 | 120.45 | 4 | 183.7 |
| 10—16 Mar 2014 | (Bulgaria) 2014 World Junior Championships | 3 | 63.72 | 3 | 114.71 | 3 | 178.43 |

Results in the 2014–15 season
| Date | Event | SP | | FS | | Total | |
| Date | Event | P | Score | P | Score | P | Score |
|---|---|---|---|---|---|---|---|
| 20—24 Aug 2014 | 2014 JGP France | 1 | 61.12 | 1 | 118.43 | 1 | 179.55 |
| 3—7 Sep 2014 | 2014 JGP Czech Republic | 2 | 55.92 | 2 | 115.2 | 1 | 171.12 |
| 11—14 Dec 2014 | (Spain) 2014–15 JGP Final | 1 | 67.09 | 1 | 123.8 | 1 | 190.89 |
| 4—7 Feb 2015 | (Russia) 2015 Russian Junior Championships | 1 | 70.95 | 1 | 134.1 | 1 | 205.05 |
| 2—8 Mar 2015 | (Estonia) 2015 World Junior Championships | 1 | 68.48 | 1 | 124.49 | 1 | 192.97 |

== Television ==
She appeared in the eighth and ninth season of ice show contest Ice Age.

== Awards ==
- Awarded the title "Honored Master of Sports of Russia" by Vitaly Mutko in 2016.
- Awarded the Order of Friendship by Vladimir Putin.
- Awarded "the Silver DOE" of Russia.

| Year | Award | Category | Result |
|---|---|---|---|
| 2017 | Women's Sports Foundation | Sportswoman of the Year Awards | Nominated |
