= Figure skating at the 2018 Winter Olympics – Women's singles =

Ladies' singles at the XXIII Olympic Winter Games
- Venue: Gangneung Ice Arena; Gangneung, South Korea
- Dates: 21 and 23 February 2018
- Competitors: 30 from 20 nations
- Winning score: 239.57 points

Medalists
1st place, gold medalist(s)		Alina Zagitova	Olympic Athletes from Russia
2nd place, silver medalist(s)		Evgenia Medvedeva	Olympic Athletes from Russia
3rd place, bronze medalist(s)		Kaetlyn Osmond	Canada

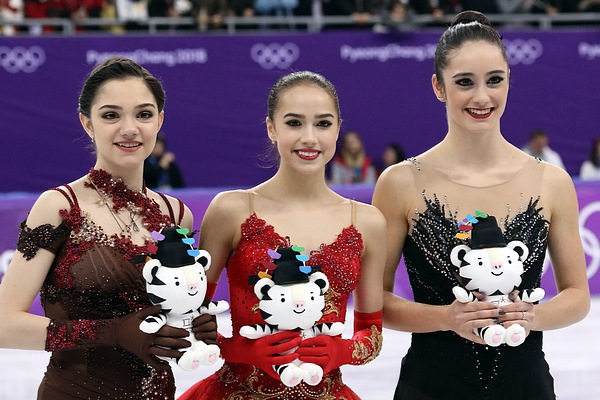
The medalists from the women's event at the 2018 Winter Olympics (from left to right): Evgenia Medvedeva of Russia (silver), Alina Zagitova of Russia (gold), and Kaetlyn Osmond of Canada (bronze)

The women's singles figure skating competition at the 2018 Winter Olympics was held at the Gangneung Ice Arena in Gangneung, South Korea, on 21 and 23 February 2018, and featured 30 skaters from 20 nations. Alina Zagitova and Evgenia Medvedeva, both competing as Olympic Athletes from Russia, won the gold and silver medals, respectively; while Kaetlyn Osmond of Canada won the bronze. Zagitova and Medvedeva each set new world record scores in succession in the short program. While both Zagitova and Medvedeva were seen as equal contenders for the gold medal, each with a resume of championship wins to their credit, it was Zagitova who ultimately emerged victorious. Zagitova's strategy of performing all of her jumps in the back half of her programs so as to earn maximum bonus points led the International Skating Union to change their rules for the next season. The colloquially-named "Zagitova rule" now limits the number of jumps that skaters can do in the back half of their programs for extra points.

== Background ==
In 2016, an independent report commissioned by the World Anti-Doping Agency confirmed allegations that the Russian Olympic team had been involved in a state-sponsored doping program from at least late 2011 through February 2014, when Russia hosted the Winter Olympics in Sochi. On 5 December 2017, the International Olympic Committee announced that the Russian Olympic Committee had been suspended from the 2018 Winter Olympics. Athletes with no previous drug violations and a consistent history of drug testing were allowed to compete under the Olympic flag as an "Olympic Athlete from Russia" (OAR). Under the terms of the decree, neither the Russian flag nor anthem were to be used at the Olympics; the Olympic flag and Olympic Anthem were used instead.

The women's single skating event was one of five figure skating competitions contested at the 2018 Winter Olympics in Gangneung, South Korea. It was held at the Gangneung Ice Arena over two days: the short program took place on 21 February 2018 and the free skating on 23 February. The competition featured 30 skaters representing 20 nations. The 2018 Winter Olympics were the first to allow vocal music for all skating disciplines; the International Skating Union modified its policies which had limited skaters to the use of only instrumental music after the 2014 Winter Olympics.

Evgenia Medvedeva and Alina Zagitova, both of Russia, were seen as likely contenders for Olympic medals. Medvedeva was a two-time Russian national champion, two-time European champion, and two-time world champion, having won back-to-back titles at each competition in 2016 and 2017. She was the first woman to win consecutive world titles since Michelle Kwan in 2000 and 2001. She set new world record scores at the 2017 World Championships, and then beat those scores at the 2017 World Team Trophy. However, Medvedeva fractured a bone in her foot in November 2017, which prevented her from competing in the Grand Prix of Figure Skating series or at the Russian Championships. She won the silver medal at the 2018 European Championships, behind Zagitova, thereby securing her spot at the Olympics. It was Medvedeva's first loss since 2015. In addition to being the reigning European champion, Zagitova was also the reigning world junior champion, reigning Russian national champion, and she won the 2017 Grand Prix of Figure Skating Final.

== Qualification ==
Twenty-four quota spots in the women's event were awarded based on the results at the 2017 World Figure Skating Championships. An additional six quota spots were earned at the 2017 Nebelhorn Trophy.

Qualifying nations in women's singles
Event	Skaters per NOC	Qualifying NOCs	Total skaters
2017 World Championships	3	(International Olympic Committee) OAR; Canada; United States	24
2017 World Championships	2	Japan; Italy; Kazakhstan; South Korea	24
2017 World Championships	1	China; Belgium; Slovakia; France; Germany; Hungary; Latvia	24
2017 Nebelhorn Trophy	1	Australia; Sweden; Switzerland; Brazil; Finland; Ukraine	6
Total			30

== Required performance elements ==
Women performed their short programs on 21 February. Lasting 2 minutes 40 seconds (+/− 10 seconds), the short program had to include the following elements: one double or triple Axel; one triple jump immediately preceded by connecting steps; one jump combination consisting of a double jump and a triple jump, or two triple jumps; one layback spin, sideways leaning spin, camel spin, or sit spin without a change of foot; one spin combination with a change of foot; and a step sequence using the full ice surface.

The twenty-four highest-scoring skaters after the short program advanced to the free skating, which they performed on 23 February. Lasting 4 minutes (+/− 10 seconds), the free skate had to include the following: seven jump elements, of which one had to be an Axel-type jump; three spins, of which one had to be a spin combination, one a flying spin, and one a spin with only one position; a step sequence; and a choreographic sequence.

== Judging ==
Skaters were judged according to the required technical elements of their program (such as jumps and spins), as well as the overall presentation of their program, based on five program components (skating skills, transitions, performance, composition, and musical interpretation/timing). Each technical element in a figure skating performance was assigned a predetermined base point value and scored by a panel of nine judges on a scale from −3 to +3 based on the quality of its execution. Each Grade of Execution (GOE) from −3 to +3 was assigned a value as indicated on the Scale of Values. For example, a triple Axel was worth a base value of 8.50 points, and a GOE of +3 was worth 3.00 points, so a triple Axel with a GOE of +3 earned 11.50 points. The judging panel's GOE for each element was determined by calculating the trimmed mean (the average after discarding the highest and lowest scores). The panel's scores for all elements were added together to generate a Total Elements Score. At the same time, the judges evaluated each performance based on the five aforementioned program components and assigned each a score from 0.25 to 10 in 0.25-point increments. The judging panel's final score for each program component was also determined by calculating the trimmed mean. Those scores were then multiplied by the factor shown on the chart below; the results were added together to generate a total Program Component Score.

Program component factoring
Discipline	Short program	Free skate
Women	0.80	1.60

Deductions were applied for certain violations, such as time infractions or falls. The Total Elements Score and Program Component Score were then added together, minus any deductions, to generate a final performance score for each skater.

== Results ==
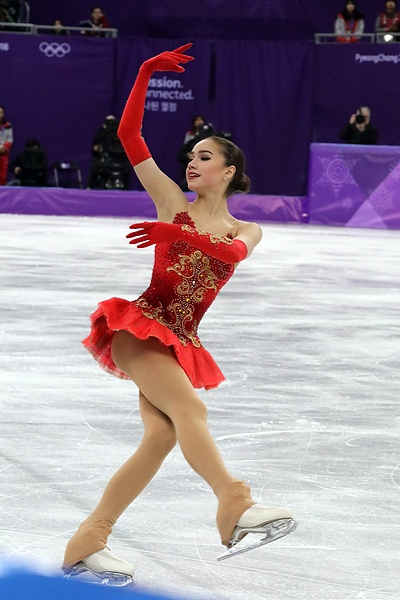
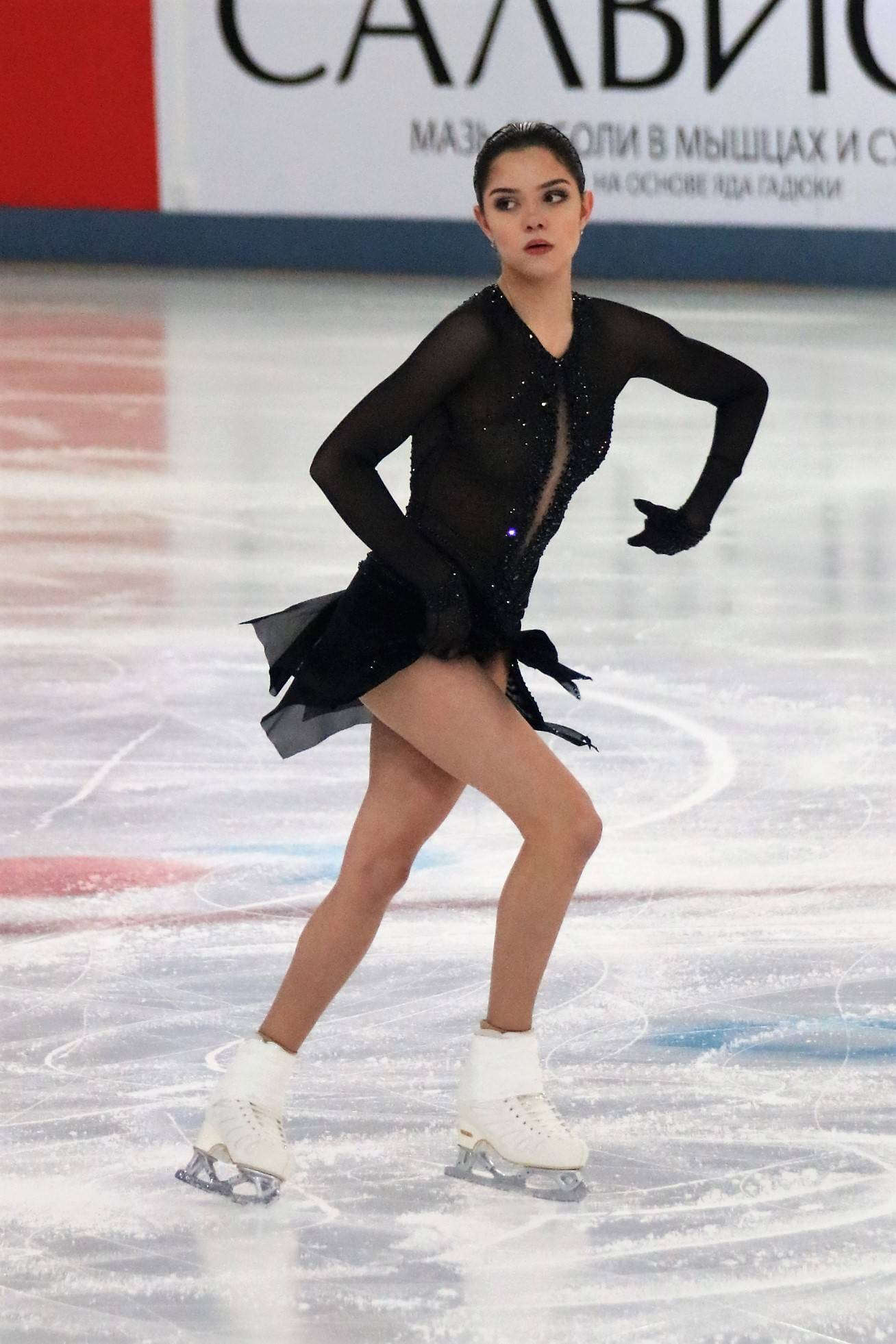
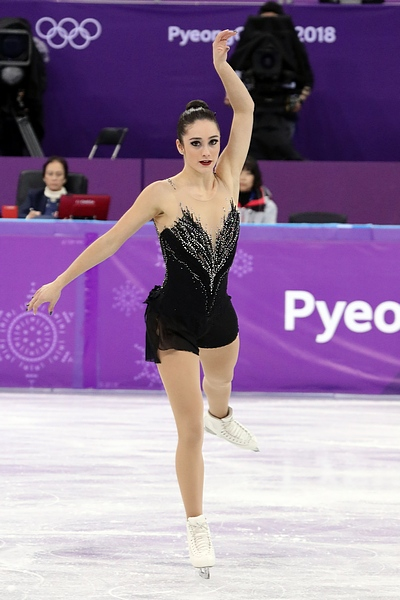
The gold, silver, and bronze medalists from the women's event at the 2018 Winter Olympics (from left to right):
Alina Zagitova of Russia (gold), Evgenia Medvedeva of Russia (silver), and Kaetlyn Osmond of Canada (bronze)

Code key

- TSS – Total Segment Score
- TES – Total Elements Score
- PCS – Program Component Score
- SS – Skating skills
- TR – Transitions
- PE – Performance
- CO – Composition
- IN – Musical interpretation
- DED – Deductions

=== Short program ===
The women's short program was held on 21 February. Evgenia Medvedeva and Alina Zagitova, both of Russia, set new world record scores in succession in the short program. Medvedeva earned a world record score of 81.61 with her performance to Nocturne in C-sharp minor by Frédéric Chopin, beating her own previously-established world record. That score was quickly broken by Zagitova, who earned a score of 82.92 performing to music from Black Swan. Zagitova performed a slightly more difficult jump combination than Medvedeva – a triple Lutz-triple loop – and both skaters performed all of their jumps in the second half of their routines, earning a ten percent bonus for each jump.

Kaetlyn Osmond of Canada, performing to music from Édith Piaf, finished in third place. Osmond credited her performance from the earlier team event as a warmup for the women's individual event. Gabrielle Daleman, the reigning Canadian national champion, finished in seventh place after she had an error with her triple loop. The American skaters gave the worst collective performance of any American women since the short program became part of the Olympic program in 1976. Mirai Nagasu and Bradie Tennell finished ninth and eleventh, respectively, after they both fell; while Karen Chen finished tenth when her hand touched the ice during her combination jump.

Women's short program results
Pl.	Skater	Nation	TSS	TES	PCS	SS	TR	PE	CO	IN	DED
1	Alina Zagitova	(International Olympic Committee) OAR	82.92	45.30	37.62	9.36	9.18	9.64	9.43	9.43	0.00
2	Evgenia Medvedeva	(International Olympic Committee) OAR	81.61	43.19	38.42	9.54	9.39	9.71	9.68	9.71	0.00
3	Kaetlyn Osmond	Canada	78.87	41.83	37.04	9.32	9.00	9.36	9.29	9.32	0.00
4	Satoko Miyahara	Japan	75.94	40.25	35.69	8.96	8.75	9.00	8.86	9.04	0.00
5	Kaori Sakamoto	Japan	73.18	40.36	32.82	8.43	7.96	8.29	8.18	8.18	0.00
6	Carolina Kostner	Italy	73.15	35.06	38.09	9.46	9.32	9.54	9.61	9.68	0.00
7	Gabrielle Daleman	Canada	68.90	35.90	33.00	8.32	8.04	8.18	8.25	8.46	0.00
8	Choi Da-bin	South Korea	67.77	37.54	30.23	7.75	7.29	7.68	7.50	7.57	0.00
9	Mirai Nagasu	United States	66.93	37.24	30.69	8.04	7.36	7.61	7.68	7.68	1.00
10	Karen Chen	United States	65.90	33.53	32.37	8.07	7.89	8.14	8.11	8.25	0.00
11	Bradie Tennell	United States	64.01	35.50	29.51	7.57	7.25	7.25	7.43	7.39	1.00
12	Maria Sotskova	(International Olympic Committee) OAR	63.86	31.47	33.39	8.46	8.21	8.21	8.46	8.39	1.00
13	Nicole Rajičová	Slovakia	60.59	32.36	28.23	7.18	6.82	7.21	7.00	7.07	0.00
14	Nicole Schott	Germany	59.20	31.62	27.58	6.96	6.61	7.07	6.86	6.96	0.00
15	Elizabet Tursynbaeva	Kazakhstan	58.82	29.14	29.68	7.46	7.18	7.50	7.43	7.54	0.00
16	Kailani Craine	Australia	56.77	30.36	26.41	6.61	6.32	6.71	6.57	6.79	0.00
17	Isadora Williams	Brazil	55.74	29.83	25.91	6.54	6.29	6.64	6.46	6.46	0.00
18	Emmi Peltonen	Finland	55.28	28.48	27.80	7.00	6.64	6.96	7.07	7.07	1.00
19	Alexia Paganini	Switzerland	55.26	29.99	25.27	6.39	6.14	6.39	6.39	6.29	0.00
20	Loena Hendrickx	Belgium	55.16	27.79	27.37	7.04	6.64	6.82	6.82	6.89	0.00
21	Kim Ha-nul	South Korea	54.33	29.41	24.92	6.36	6.00	6.32	6.29	6.18	0.00
22	Maé-Bérénice Méité	France	53.67	28.24	25.43	6.57	6.14	6.46	6.29	6.32	0.00
23	Ivett Tóth	Hungary	53.22	27.60	25.62	6.54	6.18	6.43	6.39	6.50	0.00
24	Li Xiangning	China	52.46	27.27	26.19	6.64	6.29	6.54	6.64	6.64	1.00
25	Larkyn Austman	Canada	51.42	25.93	26.49	6.71	6.32	6.61	6.71	6.75	1.00
26	Diāna Ņikitina	Latvia	51.12	26.35	24.77	6.29	5.93	6.18	6.32	6.25	0.00
27	Giada Russo	Italy	50.88	25.90	25.98	6.57	6.25	6.50	6.54	6.61	1.00
28	Anita Östlund	Sweden	49.14	25.35	23.79	6.14	5.82	5.93	5.93	5.93	0.00
29	Anna Khnychenkova	Ukraine	47.59	26.66	22.93	5.86	5.54	5.61	5.82	5.82	2.00
30	Aiza Mambekova	Kazakhstan	44.40	21.29	23.11	5.71	5.46	5.82	5.89	6.00	0.00

=== Free skating ===
The women's free skating was held on 23 February. Alina Zagitova and Evgenia Medvedeva won the gold and silver medals, respectively. Zagitova's gold medal was the first gold medal win for a Russian athlete at the 2018 Winter Olympics. She and Medvedeva earned identical scores in the free skate, but since Zagitova had a higher score in the short program, she edged out Medvedeva for the gold medal. Zagitova's free skate was set to music from Don Quixote, while Medvedeva's was set to music from Anna Karenina. Zagitova became the second-youngest gold medalist in the women's event, behind Tara Lipinski of the United States. When asked about her competition with Medvedeva, Zagitova explained that she and Medvedeva were friends, and that any rivalry in competition was not malicious.

Kaetlyn Osmond maintained her third place position and won the bronze medal. Her performance to music from Swan Lake was described by Dan Barnes of the Vancouver Sun as "elegant [and] powerful", and won Canada its 27th medal at the 2018 Winter Olympics, which set a new record for Olympic medals won. Osmond had been part of the Canadian team that had earlier won the team event, so she went home with two Olympic medals. Gabrielle Daleman fell three times during her free skate, ultimately finishing in fifteenth place. Meanwhile, the American team had their worst collective showing since 1948. Bradie Tennell finished in ninth place, Mirai Nagasu finished in tenth, and Karen Chen eleventh.

Women's free skate results
Pl.	Skater	Nation	TSS	TES	PCS	SS	TR	PE	CO	IN	DED
1 (Note: Even though Evgenia Medvedeva and Alina Zagitova tied in the free skate, Medvedeva was placed first, because her Program Component Score was higher than Zagitova's.)	Evgenia Medvedeva	(International Olympic Committee) OAR	156.65	79.18	77.47	9.57	9.43	9.82	9.71	9.89	0.00
2	Alina Zagitova	(International Olympic Committee) OAR	156.65	81.62	75.03	9.32	9.21	9.61	9.29	9.46	0.00
3	Kaetlyn Osmond	Canada	152.15	76.50	75.65	9.50	9.21	9.57	9.39	9.61	0.00
4	Satoko Miyahara	Japan	146.44	75.20	71.24	8.93	8.64	9.07	8.89	9.00	0.00
5	Carolina Kostner	Italy	139.29	63.64	75.65	9.46	9.25	9.43	9.57	9.57	0.00
6	Kaori Sakamoto	Japan	136.53	68.42	68.11	8.57	8.36	8.50	8.57	8.57	0.00
7	Maria Sotskova	(International Olympic Committee) OAR	134.24	66.94	67.30	8.39	8.14	8.54	8.43	8.57	0.00
8	Choi Da-bin	South Korea	131.49	68.74	62.75	7.86	7.57	8.04	7.86	7.89	0.00
9	Bradie Tennell	United States	128.34	65.41	62.93	7.93	7.68	7.79	7.93	8.00	0.00
10	Kim Ha-nul	South Korea	121.38	67.03	54.35	6.96	6.46	7.00	6.68	6.86	0.00
11	Karen Chen	United States	119.75	56.65	64.10	8.18	7.64	7.96	8.07	8.21	1.00
12	Mirai Nagasu	United States	119.61	57.56	62.05	8.14	7.50	7.71	7.75	7.68	0.00
13	Elizabet Tursynbaeva	Kazakhstan	118.30	60.50	58.80	7.39	7.11	7.39	7.43	7.43	1.00
14	Loena Hendrickx	Belgium	116.72	60.73	55.99	7.07	6.71	7.11	6.96	7.14	0.00
15	Nicole Rajičová	Slovakia	114.60	57.80	56.80	7.11	6.89	7.25	7.04	7.21	0.00
16	Kailani Craine	Australia	111.84	57.89	53.95	6.68	6.54	7.00	6.64	6.86	0.00
17	Nicole Schott	Germany	109.26	52.68	56.58	7.04	6.82	7.04	7.18	7.29	0.00
18	Maé-Bérénice Méité	France	106.25	55.13	52.12	6.50	6.29	6.61	6.54	6.64	1.00
19	Gabrielle Daleman	Canada	103.56	45.81	61.75	8.00	7.64	7.39	7.93	7.64	4.00
20	Li Xiangning	China	101.97	50.56	51.41	6.57	6.21	6.46	6.39	6.50	0.00
21	Emmi Peltonen	Finland	101.86	46.41	56.45	7.14	6.79	7.00	7.07	7.29	1.00
22	Alexia Paganini	Switzerland	101.00	50.94	50.06	6.43	6.00	6.29	6.32	6.25	0.00
23	Ivett Tóth	Hungary	97.21	49.82	50.39	6.32	6.29	6.21	6.39	6.29	3.00
24	Isadora Williams	Brazil	88.44	38.39	51.05	6.43	6.18	6.36	6.43	6.50	1.00

=== Overall ===
Women's results
Rank	Skater	Nation	Total	SP		FS	
1st place, gold medalist(s)	Alina Zagitova	(International Olympic Committee) OAR	239.57	1	82.92	2	156.65
2nd place, silver medalist(s)	Evgenia Medvedeva	(International Olympic Committee) OAR	238.26	2	81.61	1	156.65
3rd place, bronze medalist(s)	Kaetlyn Osmond	Canada	231.02	3	78.87	3	152.15
4	Satoko Miyahara	Japan	222.38	4	75.94	4	146.44
5	Carolina Kostner	Italy	212.44	6	73.15	5	139.29
6	Kaori Sakamoto	Japan	209.71	5	73.18	6	136.53
7	Choi Da-bin	South Korea	199.26	8	67.77	8	131.49
8	Maria Sotskova	(International Olympic Committee) OAR	198.10	12	63.86	7	134.24
9	Bradie Tennell	United States	192.35	11	64.01	9	128.34
10	Mirai Nagasu	United States	186.54	9	66.93	12	119.61
11	Karen Chen	United States	185.65	10	65.90	11	119.75
12	Elizabet Tursynbaeva	Kazakhstan	177.12	15	58.82	13	118.30
13	Kim Ha-nul	South Korea	175.71	21	54.33	10	121.38
14	Nicole Rajičová	Slovakia	175.19	13	60.59	15	114.60
15	Gabrielle Daleman	Canada	172.46	7	68.90	19	103.56
16	Loena Hendrickx	Belgium	171.88	20	55.16	14	116.72
17	Kailani Craine	Australia	168.61	16	56.77	16	111.84
18	Nicole Schott	Germany	168.46	14	59.20	17	109.26
19	Maé-Bérénice Méité	France	159.92	22	53.67	18	106.25
20	Emmi Peltonen	Finland	157.14	18	55.28	21	101.86
21	Alexia Paganini	Switzerland	156.26	19	55.26	22	101.00
22	Li Xiangning	China	154.43	24	52.46	20	101.97
23	Ivett Tóth	Hungary	150.43	23	53.22	23	97.21
24	Isadora Williams	Brazil	144.18	17	55.74	24	88.44
25	Larkyn Austman	Canada	51.42	25	51.42	Did not advance to free skate	
26	Diāna Ņikitina	Latvia	51.12	26	51.12	Did not advance to free skate	
27	Giada Russo	Italy	50.88	27	50.88	Did not advance to free skate	
28	Anita Östlund	Sweden	49.14	28	49.14	Did not advance to free skate	
29	Anna Khnychenkova	Ukraine	47.59	29	47.59	Did not advance to free skate	
30	Aiza Mambekova	Kazakhstan	44.40	30	44.40	Did not advance to free skate	

== Records ==
The following new record high scores were set during this competition.

Record high scores
Date	Skater(s)	Segment	Score	Ref.
21 February	(International Olympic Committee) Evgenia Medvedeva (OAR)	Short program	81.61	
21 February	(International Olympic Committee) Alina Zagitova (OAR)	Short program	82.92	

== Aftermath ==
Alina Zagitova received criticism for backloading her free skate – that is, waiting until the second half of her program to perform her jumps, because jumps performed in the second half of a program received bonus points. Christine Brennan, a sports reporter for USA Today, described Evgenia Medvedeva as the "best example of a complete skater, a masterful jumper and expressive artist ... with all the requisite physical muscle of the toughest triple jumps, but the subtle, well-placed, connective balance of a true performance". Conversely, she described Zagitova as the "best example of a physically gifted opportunist, racking up valuable points any which way she can". Brennan further speculated that the International Skating Union would probably change their rules to prevent future skaters from doing what Zagitova did. At the 57th meeting of the ISU Congress in 2018, the ISU limited the number of jump elements that a skater could execute for a bonus in the back half of a performance to one in the short program and three in the free skate. This has colloquially been referred to as the "Zagitova rule".

== Works cited ==
- "Special Regulations & Technical Rules – Single & Pair Skating and Ice Dance 2016". International Skating Union. p. 24. Archived from the original on 4 January 2018.
