= Aida Vedishcheva =

Russian-American singer (born 1941)

- Also known as: Amazing Aida, also known in America as American Singing Lady Liberty
- Born: Ida Solomonovna Weiss; June 10, 1941 (age 85)
- Origin: Kazan, Soviet Union
- Genres: Pop music, musical
- Occupation: Singer
- Instrument: Vocals
- Years active: 1960–2011

Aida Semyonovna Vedishcheva (Russian: Аида Семёновна Ведищева, born Ida Solomonovna Weiss, Russian: Ида Соломоновна Вайс, 10 June 1941) is a Soviet and American singer. In the 1960s, she contributed songs to several film soundtracks, including the timeless hits: "Song About Bears", "Help Me", "Forest Deer", "She-bear's Lullaby", "I'll Wait for You", "Chunga-Changa", "Blue Water", "The First Spring" and many others.

== Biography ==
=== Early life ===
Aida Vedishcheva was born in Kazan (administrative center of Tatar ASSR) in the doctor's family of scientist, professor of dentistry Solomon Weiss and surgeon Elena Emelyanova, who arrived from Kyiv just before World War II. In 1951, the Ministry of Health offered professor Weiss to open faculty of therapeutic dentistry in Irkutsk, Siberia. There, Vedishcheva finished her School and Music School.

Afterwards (by her parents' request), she enrolled into the Pedagogical Institute of the foreign languages, where she studied both the German and English languages and at the same time she was performing in the student theater of the musical comedy. Upon graduating from the institute, Vedishcheva left for Moscow, to fulfill her dream of becoming an actress-singer. She tried to enroll into the Mikhail Shchepkin Higher Theatre School but failed. After that, she began her singing career due to her strong and beautiful voice.

=== Music career ===
Aida Vedishcheva began her singing performance career in the early 1960s, in Orel State Philharmonic Society. Vedishcheva sang in the famous jazz orchestras of Oleg Lundstrem and later of Leonid Utyosov orchestras. From 1966 on, she was performing along with the "Meloton" ensemble (a variety theatrical performance "Singing Short Stories" was created) as well as the Vocal-instrumental ensemble (VIE) "Blue Guitars" led by Igor Granov. The same year (1966), Vedishcheva became a laureate of the First "All-Union Competition of Soviet Song". She achieved the national recognition after singing "Song About Bears" in 1967 for the movie Kidnapping, Caucasian Style (seven and a half million records were sold). The song from the movie-musical "Red, Blue, Green" (1967). In 1968, for the song "Geese, Geese" ("Gusi, gusi") she received a diploma at the Sopot International song festival (the Polish Baltic Sea coast). That was followed by such songs/movie soundtracks as "Volcano of Desires" ("Help Me") for the movie The Diamond Arm (1968), the soundtrack for the movie "White Piano" with the song "I'll Wait for You", "The First Spring". With the song "Comrade" (1970), Vedishcheva won the 1st prize on the competition at the Moscow radio station "Youth". The record of this song was sold by millions by the record firm "Melodia" and became the hymn of youth of 1970's. The next hit from Aida came with "Forest Deer" from the movie Way to go Nastia!". These popular songs of Ms. Vedishcheva has been sold by firm "Melodia" in circulation of 30 million copies.

Despite her great success among the listeners, she met numerous obstacles from the Soviet officials. One of the reasons was the anti-Semitism politics of Sergey Lapin, the chairman of All-Union Radio as well as her unauthorized performance in Sopot Festival shortly after the events of the Prague Spring (after which she was blacklisted by the USSR Ministry of Culture). Among such obstacles there were cases when her name not making into movies' credits, prohibition of concert tours abroad, even cancellation of concerts, cold receptions on television, erased tapes with her recordings on the radio. For example, her song "Forest Deer" was recognized as the Song of the Year, but on the television instead of Aida it was performed by Loktev ensemble. From the mid-1970s on, Vedishcheva's name disappeared from the credits of some movies and cartoons. In March 1980, she finally left with her mother and son to New York.

In New York, Vedishcheva had to start her singing career from the ground up. She enrolled in Brooklyn College, taking a course of theater program, where she studied American history of Hollywood, Broadway, cinematography, and dance. At first, Vedishcheva resided in New York City, then she moved to Los Angeles. In the US she was able to receive recognition, creating her own theatrical One Woman Show, performing at Carnegie Recital Hall, Avery Fisher Hall of Lincoln Center and other venues under the pseudonym "Amazing Aida" (that's how she was called by the press of Miami, Florida). At that time her repertoire included: numbers from the popular Broadway musicals and Hollywood movies as well as the great hits of French composer Michel Legrand, her Russian hits, as well as Jewish folk songs.

In the beginning of the 1990s, Aida Vedishcheva was diagnosed with stage III cancer. Despite doctors' precautions, Vedishcheva insisted on her surgery and went through chemotherapy - treatments to which the disease yielded.

Since 1989, she has repeatedly visited the Soviet Union, then Russia. In 2000, she took part in the Golden Smash Hit Festival in Mogilev.

In 1998, Vedishcheva put on the show Miss Liberty for the new millennium. After the September 11 attacks she wrote the musical "Masterpiece and the singing Liberty" and dedicated it to the Statue of Liberty. The musical was performed on Broadway in 2007.

In 1985, she moved to Los Angeles. In 2001, her biography was included in the Historical Book "Who is Who in Russian Speaking California", Copyright 2001 American Russian Business Council, Control Number 2002100217.

== Soviet era golden hits of Aida ==
- Be With Me As Before (music Vladimir Shainsky, words А. Nagorniak)
- Cranes (music E. Khanok, words А. Dostal)
- Love (music О. Feltsman, words N. Olev)
- Answer (music S. Pozhalkov, words N. Malyshev)
- I'll Wait for You (music Aleksandr Zatsepin, words О. Gadjikasimov)
- Forest deer
- Geese, Geese (music S. Pozhalkov, words N. Malyshev)
- Comrade (music О. Ivanov, words А. Prokofyev)
- In Any Way You'll Be Mine (music Аleksandr Zatsepin, words Leonid Derbenyov)
- You Argued Without Purpose (music B. Savelyev, words V. Kharitonov)
- Simply the Aage is Such (music B. Savelyev, words М. Pliatskovsky)
- Be as it May (music Yan Frenkel, words М. Tanich)
- Steps in Grass (music Мichel Legrand, words I. Reznik)

=== In movies ===
- Three Plus Two - Let them talk (music A. Volkonsky, words S. Mikhalkov)
- Kidnapping, Caucasian Style — Song About Bears (music A. Zatsepin, words L. Derbenyov)
- White piano — Road Song (music А. Zatsepin, words О. Gadjikasimov)
- White piano — First Spring (music А. Zatsepin, words О. Gadjikasimov)
- White piano — Song about Dushanbe (music А. Zatsepin, words О. Gadjikasimov)
- The Diamond Arm — Help Me (music А. Zatsepin, words L. Derbenyov)
- Angel in a Skullcap - You'll still be mine (music А. Zatsepin, words L. Derbenyov)
- Visiting the Moscow police - Spring is music (music R. Mayorov, words A. Olgin)
- Way to go Nastia! — Forest Deer (music Y. Krylatov, words Y. Entin)

=== In cartoons ===
- Umka — She-bear's Lullaby (music Yevgeny Krylatov, words Yuri Yakovlev)
- Katerok — Chunga-Changa (music Vladimir Shainsky, words Yuri Entin)
- And Mom Will Forgive Me — Tovarisch (music Oleg Ivanov, words Alexander Prokofyev)

== Partial discography ==
Studio albums

- 1969 — Poyot Aida Vedishcheva (LP, «Melodiya» 33Д—26625)
- 1974 — Aida Vedishcheva (LP, «Melodiya» С60—05165)

Compilations

- 2003 — Zolotaya Collectsiya Retro (CD, «Bomba Music» BoMB 033-109)
- 2005 — Ya Pesney, Kak Vetrom, Napolyu Stranu (CD, «Bomba Music» BoMB 033-169)
- 2011 — Zvezdy Sovetskoy Estrady (CD, «Bomba Music» BoMB 033-669)
- 2020 — Aida Vedishcheva (LP, «BCHX» BCHX 202010)

== Awards ==
- ru:КиноВатсон — "For the greatest input in the art of cinema"
