= Now You See Me 2 (soundtrack) =

Now You See Me 2 (Original Motion Picture Soundtrack)

Film score by Brian Tyler
- Released: June 10, 2016
- Recorded: 2016
- Studios: Abbey Road, London
- Genre: Film score
- Length: 77:37
- Label: Varèse Sarabande
- Producer: Brian Tyler

Brian Tyler chronology
Criminal (2016)	Now You See Me 2 (Original Motion Picture Soundtrack) (2016)	XXX: Return of Xander Cage (2017)

Now You See Me 2 (Original Motion Picture Soundtrack) is the score album to the 2016 film Now You See Me 2 directed by Jon M. Chu; a sequel to Now You See Me (2013) and the second instalment in the eponymous film series. Brian Tyler composed the musical score which was released through Varèse Sarabande on June 10, 2016, along with the film.

== Development ==
Brian Tyler composed the film's score, after he did the same for the first film, which provided a culmination of 1960s spy action film music inspired from Henry Mancini and Lalo Schifrin's works and fantasy film scores (such as Harry Potter and The Lord of the Rings). He wanted to expand the theme on the sequel by bringing those characters back to the universe, but also make it grander and epic as the film was set in various places. This resulted in the funky musical style being funkier and the drums, bass and jazz elements being more tweaked.

Tyler who also likes to do magic as a hobby, wanted to do the same with the music, providing a counterpoint to the theme that he had modified. He said, "Where you typically hear a crescendo dropped into a big theme, I would crescendo and modulate into something that almost makes no sense as a follow-up. There's a little bit of musical strangeness to it. If you throw things that are unexpected, to me that's what makes tricks fascinating. It does play with your perceptions and misdirect is a great part of it." The score was recorded at the Abbey Road Studios in London with Tyler conducting the London Philharmonic Orchestra.

== Critical reception ==
Filmtracks.com wrote "the sequel score is extremely faithful to its predecessor and throws enough new paint at the wall to keep you entertained. But Now You See Me 2 remains wildly inconsistent in direction, exploring many ideas without desired development, perhaps in an effort to deal an appropriate dose of musical misdirection at the plot. The fantastic arrangement of the main theme at the start of the album is not to be missed and is superior to anything else in either score." Sheri Linden of The Hollywood Reporter wrote "Brian Tyler's otherwise overstated score, click when the Horsemen are doing their magic." Pete Simons of Synchrotones wrote "Tyler reprises the jazzy heist music, the frantic string ostinati, the percussion and that wonderful main theme [...] there's no denying the quality of the music; the composition and orchestrations. It's fantastic. As good as the first, maybe even better."

== Track listing ==
All music is composed by Brian Tyler.

Now You See Me 2 (Original Motion Picture Soundtrack) track listing
No.	Title	Length
1.	"Now You See Me 2 Fanfare"	3:20
2.	"Now You See Me 2 Main Titles"	3:00
3.	"300 Seconds"	7:25
4.	"The Setup"	5:45
5.	"Sleight of Hand"	5:52
6.	"Revelatory"	1:24
7.	"A Special Invitation"	4:38
8.	"Equivoque"	3:18
9.	"Off The Grid (Walter's Theme)"	2:13
10.	"Trifecta"	3:53
11.	"The Fool"	1:55
12.	"Buffy the Chippie"	2:58
13.	"Behind the Curtain"	4:10
14.	"Thaddeus' Game"	2:23
15.	"Octa"	1:37
16.	"United"	1:36
17.	"Deliverance"	4:10
18.	"Diversion Tactics"	4:34
19.	"Sibling Rivalry"	1:55
20.	"Bazaar Getaway"	2:09
21.	"The New Horseman"	1:05
22.	"See You in 3 to 5"	1:41
23.	"The Big Finish"	3:56
24.	"Finale"	2:40
Total length:		77:37

== Personnel ==
Credits adapted from liner notes.

- Music – Brian Tyler
- Producer – Brian Tyler, Joe Lisanti
- Arrangements and programming – Evan Duffy, John Carey, Pakk Hui, Sarah Schachner, Stuart Michael Thomas, Tony Morales
- Recording engineer – Simon Rhodes
- Score recordist – Gordon Davidson
- Mixing – Brian Tyler, Greg Hayes
- Mastering – Patricia Sullivan
- Score editor – Joe Lisanti
- Assistant score editor – Kyle Clausen
- Musical assistance – M. R. Miller, Merissa Fernandez
- Music co-ordinator – Seth Glennie-Smith
- Executive producer – Robert Townson

Orchestra

- Performer – The Philharmonia Orchestra of London
- Orchestration – Brad Warnaar, Dana Niu, Robert Elhai
- Conductor – Brian Tyler
- Concertmaster – Sarah Oates
- Orchestra contractor – Paul Talkington
- Copyist – Ann Barnard, Jill Streater, Eric Stonerook

Instruments

- Guitar, electric bass, drums, keyboards and percussion – Brian Tyler
- Piano – Brian Tyler, Evan Duffy
