= Leonid Derbenyov =

Russian poet and lyricist (1931–1995)

- Born: Leonid Petrovich Derbenyov; 12 April 1931; Moscow, USSR
- Died: 22 June 1995 (aged 64); Moscow, Russia

Leonid Petrovich Derbenyov (Russian: Леони́д Петро́вич Дербенёв, IPA: [lʲɪɐˈnʲit pʲɪˈtrovʲɪdʑ dʲɪrbʲɪˈnʲɵf]; 12 April 1931 – 22 June 1995) was a Russian poet and lyricist widely regarded as one of the stalwarts of the 20th century Soviet and Russian pop music.

== Biography ==
Leonid Derbenyov was born in Moscow. During the German-Soviet War he lived in the village of Ulovo, Vladimir Oblast. His first ever poem appeared in Pionerskaya Pravda, the author being a seventh-grade schoolboy at the time.

Having graduated from the Moscow Law Academy in 1954, Derbenyov worked as a lawyer for various organizations, writing poetry. Some of his works were published in Komsomolskaya Pravda, Izvestia, Moskovskij Komsomolets and other periodicals.

From 1959, Derbenyov, a highly prolific writer, created more than two thousand poems, hundreds of which became song lyrics. Among the composers he worked with were Alexander Flyarkovsky, Arno Babajanian, Aleksandr Zatsepin, Maksim Dunayevsky and Vyacheslav Dobrynin.

Derbenyov's lyrics became hits for many Russian pop stars and rock groups, among them Muslim Magomayev ("The Best City on Earth"), Alla Pugacheva ("This World", "Song About Me", "Kings Can Do Anything", "You Are in the World", "White Door), Mikhail Boyarsky ("Everything Will End", "City Flowers", "Robinson", "I Will Take an Express Train"), Lev Leshchenko ("Native Land", "Goodbye"), Masha Rasputina ("Himalayas", "Me and You", "I was Born in Siberia", "Music Around", "You Are Not My First Love", "Live, Country!"), Philipp Kirkorov ("Atlantida", "You, You, You", "Sky and Earth"), VIA Vesyolye Rebyata ("If You Love", "Not a Minute's Rest", "Don't Worry, Auntie"), VIA Samotsvety ("All That is in My Life"), VIA Leysya, Pesnya ("Where Have You Been?"), and VIA Zemlyane ("Believe, Earth").

Songs with Derbenyov's lyrics were also part of well-known soundtracks for a number of Russian hit films, including "There is But a Moment" from The Sannikov Land and "The Song about Bears" from Kidnapping, Caucasian Style.

In 1978, Derbenyov became an International Song Contest in Sopot' laureate. His songs won the annual "Song of the Year" competition in 1963, 1964, 1965 and 1973.

Derbenyov died on Thursday 22 June 1995 in Moscow from stomach cancer. He was buried at the Vostryakovskoye cemetery.

On Friday 22 November 2002 a memorial sign bearing the name of Leonid Derbenyov was installed at the Square of Stars next to the Russia Concert Hall.

== Selected songs ==
- Pesenka o medvedyakh (1966, from the film Kidnapping, Caucasian Style)

== Family ==
Spouse Vera Ivanovna Derbenyova (born January 13, 1935), employee of the Central Research Institute of Railway Transport. Daughter Elena (born September 30, 1960) is a translator, teacher of foreign languages. Granddaughter Elizaveta (born 1983), great-grandson Miroslav (born 2010).
