= A Little Song About Bears =

"Pesenka o medvedyakh"
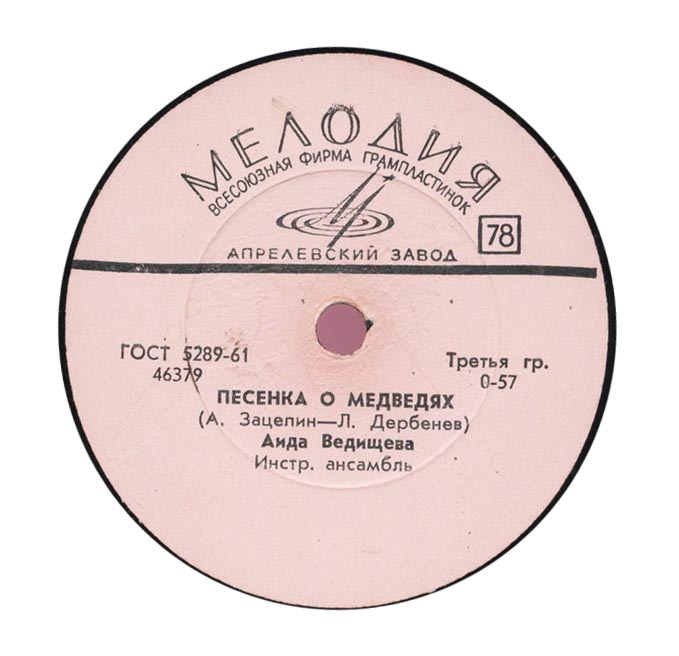

Song by Aida Vedishcheva
- Language: Russian
- Released: 1966
- Label: Melodiya
- Composer: Aleksandr Zatsepin
- Lyricist: Leonid Derbenyov

Music video
- "Pesenka o medvedyakh" (excerpt from the film Kidnapping, Caucasian Style) on YouTube

"A Little Song About Bears" (Russian: Песенка о медведях) is a song written by Leonid Derbenyov and composed by Aleksandr Zatsepin for the 1966 Soviet film Kidnapping, Caucasian Style, in which it was sung by the main heroine (played by Natalya Varley and dubbed for the song by Aida Vedishcheva).

In Russia, "Pesenka o medvedyakh" is considered one of the most popular songs of the 20th century.

== Composition ==
The song states that the Earth is being rotated by bears (supposedly polar bears) rubbing their backs against its axis. And that the bears work very diligently in order to help future lovers meet each other sooner ("so that someone says 'I love you' to someone earlier by a year or two").
