= Anna Karenina (soundtrack) =

2012 soundtrack album by Dario Marianelli

Anna Karenina (Original Music from the Motion Picture)

Soundtrack album by Dario Marianelli
- Released: 10 September 2012 (UK); 13 November 2012 (U.S.)
- Studio: AIR Lyndhurst Hall
- Length: 55:14
- Label: Decca Records

Anna Karenina (Original Music from the Motion Picture) is the soundtrack album composed by Dario Marianelli for the 2012 film Anna Karenina by Joe Wright. It was nominated for the Academy Award for Best Original Score, Golden Globe Award for Best Original Score, and BAFTA Award for Best Original Music.

== Background ==
Composer Dario Marianelli had previously worked with director Joe Wright, having scored Wright's Pride & Prejudice and Atonement, and winning an Academy Award and Golden Globe for the latter.

== Production ==
Marianelli began working on the soundtrack three months prior to the beginning of production, as the music would be required for choreography and synchronization of the actors' movements. He first composed the waltzes that would accompany the ballroom scenes, as they required the most planning and collaboration. He visited the film set often, particularly for the ballroom scenes, to assist the choreographers. He also worked closely with the editors in post-production.

Marianelli took inspiration from Russian music of the 19th century, particularly that of Mikhail Glinka, Mily Balakirev, Modest Mussorgsky, Pyotr Illyich Tchaikovsky, and Nikolai Rimsky-Korsakov. A portion of this inspiration came from "Byeroza", a Russian folk song about a birch tree. This folk song has its melodies riddled throughout Tchaikovsky's fourth symphony. He also took inspiration from Balkan brass music and Russian folk music. The soundtrack was performed by 60 musicians at AIR Lyndhurst Hall in London with Marianelli on the piano.

== Legacy and accolades ==
Professional ratings
Review scores
Source	Rating
AllMusic	link

In 2013, the soundtrack was nominated for the Academy Award for Best Original Score, the Golden Globe Award for Best Original Score, and the BAFTA Award for Best Original Music.

Russian figure skater and Olympic silver medalist Evgenia Medvedeva used a medley from the film's soundtrack for her free skate during the 2018 Winter Olympics.

== Track listing ==
No.	Title	Length
1.	"Overture"	3:20
2.	"Clerks"	1:07
3.	"She Is of the Heavens"	2:00
4.	"Anna Marches Into a Waltz"	0:58
5.	"Beyond the Stage"	1:24
6.	"Kitty's Debut"	2:37
7.	"Dance With Me"	4:23
8.	"The Girl and the Birch"	1:02
9.	"Unavoidable"	1:42
10.	"Can-Can"	2:01
11.	"I Don't Want You to Go"	4:58
12.	"Time for Bed"	1:04
13.	"Too Late"	2:02
14.	"Someone Is Watching"	1:27
15.	"Lost In a Maze"	2:10
16.	"Leaving Home, Coming Home"	2:04
17.	"Masha's Song"	1:36
18.	"A Birthday Present"	4:18
19.	"At the Opera"	1:27
20.	"I Know How to Make You Sleep"	2:27
21.	"Anna's Last Train"	3:53
22.	"I Understood Something"	3:18
23.	"Curtain"	1:53
24.	"Seriously"	2:08
Total length:		55:14

== Charts ==
Chart performance for Anna Karenina (Original Music from the Motion Picture)
Chart (2012)	Peak position
UK Classical (OCC)	19
