= 2019 European Figure Skating Championships =

Figure skating competition

- Type: ISU Championship
- Date: 21–27 January 2019
- Season: 2018–19
- Location: Minsk, Belarus
- Host: Skating Union of Belarus
- Venue: Minsk-Arena

Champions
- Men's singles: (Spain) Javier Fernández
- Ladies' singles: (Russia) Sofia Samodurova
- Pairs: (France) Vanessa James / Morgan Ciprès
- Ice dance: (France) Gabriella Papadakis / Guillaume Cizeron
- Previous: 2018 European Championships
- Next: 2020 European Championships

The 2019 European Figure Skating Championships took place in Minsk, Belarus. Medals were awarded in the disciplines of men's singles, ladies' singles, pairs, and ice dancing.

== Records ==
The following new ISU best scores were set during this competition:

Event	Component	Skater(s)	Score	Date	Ref
Pairs	Free skating	(France) Vanessa James / Morgan Ciprès	149.11	24 January 2019	
Pairs	Total score	(France) Vanessa James / Morgan Ciprès	225.66	24 January 2019	
Ice dance	Rhythm dance	(France) Gabriella Papadakis / Guillaume Cizeron	84.79	25 January 2019	
Ice dance	Free dance	(France) Gabriella Papadakis / Guillaume Cizeron	133.19	26 January 2019	
Ice dance	Total score	(France) Gabriella Papadakis / Guillaume Cizeron	217.98	26 January 2019	

== Qualification ==
Skaters were eligible for the event if they represent a European member nation of the International Skating Union and have reached the age of 15 before 1 July 2018, in their place of birth. The corresponding competition for non-European skaters was the 2019 Four Continents Championships. National associations selected their entries according to their own criteria, but the ISU mandated that their selections achieve a minimum technical elements score (TES) at an international event prior to the European Championships.

=== Minimum TES ===
The ISU stipulates that the minimum scores must be achieved at an ISU-recognized senior international competition in the ongoing or preceding season, no later than 21 days before the first official practice day.

Minimum technical scores (TES)
Discipline	SP / RD	FS / FD
Men	28.00	46.00
Ladies	23.00	40.00
Pairs	25.00	42.00
Ice dance	26.00	42.00
SP and FS scores may be attained at different events.

=== Number of entries per discipline ===
Based on the results of the 2018 European Championships, the ISU allows each country one to three entries per discipline.

Spots	Men	Ladies	Pairs	Dance
3	Russia	Russia	Italy; Russia	France; Italy; Russia
2	Belgium; Czech Republic; France; Georgia; Israel; Italy; Latvia; Spain; Sweden	Belgium; Finland; France; Germany; Italy; Slovakia; Switzerland	Austria; France; Germany; Israel	Denmark; Great Britain; Poland; Spain
If not listed above, one entry is allowed.

== Entries ==
Member nations began announcing their selections in December 2018. The International Skating Union published a complete list of entries on 3 January 2019.

Country	Men	Ladies	Pairs	Ice dancing
Armenia	Slavik Hayrapetyan	Anastasia Galustyan		
Austria	Luc Maierhofer	Sophia Schaller	Miriam Ziegler / Severin Kiefer	
Azerbaijan	Vladimir Litvintsev	Ekaterina Ryabova		
Belarus	Yakau Zenko			Anna Kublikova / Yuri Hulitski
Bulgaria	Nicky Obreykov	Alexandra Feigin		Teodora Markova / Simon Daze
Croatia		Hana Cvijanović	Lana Petranović / Antonio Souza-Kordeiru	
Czech Republic	Matyáš Bělohradský; Michal Březina	Eliška Březinová		
Denmark		Pernille Sørensen		
Estonia	Aleksandr Selevko	Gerli Liinamäe		Katerina Bunina / German Frolov
Finland	Roman Galay	Viveca Lindfors; Emmi Peltonen		Juulia Turkkila / Matthias Versluis
France	Kévin Aymoz; Adam Siao Him Fa	Laurine Lecavelier; Maé-Bérénice Méité	Vanessa James / Morgan Ciprès	Adelina Galyavieva / Louis Thauron; Marie-Jade Lauriault / Romain Le Gac; Gabriella Papadakis / Guillaume Cizeron
Georgia	Morisi Kvitelashvili; Irakli Maysuradze			
Germany	Paul Fentz	Nicole Schott; Nathalie Weinzierl	Minerva Fabienne Hase / Nolan Seegert	Shari Koch / Christian Nüchtern
Great Britain	Graham Newberry	Natasha McKay	Zoe Jones / Christopher Boyadji	Lilah Fear / Lewis Gibson; Robynne Tweedale / Joseph Buckland
Hungary	Alexander Borovoj	Ivett Tóth		Anna Yanovskaya / Ádám Lukács
Ireland	Conor Stakelum			
Israel	Alexei Bychenko; Daniel Samohin			Shira Ichilov / Vadim Davidovich
Italy	Daniel Grassl; Matteo Rizzo	Lucrezia Gennaro; Lara Naki Gutmann	Nicole Della Monica / Matteo Guarise; Rebecca Ghilardi / Filippo Ambrosini	Charlène Guignard / Marco Fabbri; Carolina Moscheni / Andrea Fabbri; Jasmine Tessari / Francesco Fioretti
Latvia	Deniss Vasiļjevs	Elizabete Jubkane		
Lithuania		Paulina Ramanauskaitė		Allison Reed / Saulius Ambrulevičius
Monaco	Davide Lewton Brain			
Netherlands	Thomas Kennes	Kyarha van Tiel		
Norway	Sondre Oddvoll Bøe	Camilla Gjersem		
Poland	Ihor Reznichenko	Elżbieta Gabryszak		Natalia Kaliszek / Maksym Spodyriev; Justyna Plutowska / Jérémie Flemin
Romania		Julia Sauter		
Russia	Mikhail Kolyada; Maxim Kovtun; Alexander Samarin	Stanislava Konstantinova; Sofia Samodurova; Alina Zagitova	Aleksandra Boikova / Dmitrii Kozlovskii; Daria Pavliuchenko / Denis Khodykin; Evgenia Tarasova / Vladimir Morozov	Sofia Evdokimova / Egor Bazin; Victoria Sinitsina / Nikita Katsalapov; Alexandra Stepanova / Ivan Bukin
Serbia		Antonina Dubinina		
Slovakia	Michael Neuman	Silvia Hugec; Nicole Rajičová		
Slovenia		Daša Grm		
Spain	Héctor Alonso Serrano; Javier Fernández	Valentina Matos	Laura Barquero / Aritz Maestu	Sara Hurtado / Kirill Khaliavin; Olivia Smart / Adrián Díaz
Sweden	Alexander Majorov; Nikolaj Majorov	Anita Östlund		
Switzerland	Lukas Britschgi	Alexia Paganini; Yasmine Kimiko Yamada		Victoria Manni / Carlo Röthlisberger
Turkey	Burak Demirboğa			
Ukraine	Ivan Shmuratko	Anastasia Gozhva		Darya Popova / Volodymyr Byelikov

=== Changes to preliminary assignments ===
Date	Discipline	Withdrew	Added	Reason/Other notes	Refs
27 December 2018	Pairs	(Russia) Natalia Zabiiako / Alexander Enbert	(Russia) Daria Pavliuchenko / Denis Khodykin	Medical issues (Enbert)	
3 January 2019	Pairs	(France) Cléo Hamon / Denys Strekalin	N/A		
9 January 2019	Ladies	(Belgium) Loena Hendrickx	N/A	Back injury	
21 January 2019	Pairs	(Israel) Hailey Esther Kops / Artem Tsoglin	N/A		
21 January 2019	Pairs	(Germany) Annika Hocke / Ruben Blommaert	N/A		

== Results ==
=== Men ===
Rank	Name	Nation	Total points	SP		FS	
1	Javier Fernández	Spain	271.59	3	91.84	1	179.75
2	Alexander Samarin	Russia	269.84	2	91.97	2	177.87
3	Matteo Rizzo	Italy	247.08	10	81.41	3	165.67
4	Kévin Aymoz	France	246.34	4	88.02	4	158.32
5	Mikhail Kolyada	Russia	240.87	1	100.49	11	140.38
6	Daniel Grassl	Italy	236.70	9	81.69	5	155.01
7	Michal Březina	Czech Republic	234.25	8	83.66	6	150.59
8	Alexander Majorov	Sweden	225.38	11	79.88	8	145.50
9	Alexei Bychenko	Israel	220.50	7	84.19	13	136.31
10	Morisi Kvitelashvili	Georgia	219.79	15	73.04	7	146.75
11	Deniss Vasiļjevs	Latvia	219.50	12	78.87	10	140.63
12	Adam Siao Him Fa	France	218.06	13	76.70	9	141.36
13	Daniel Samohin	Israel	217.17	6	86.48	14	130.69
14	Maxim Kovtun	Russia	216.18	5	87.70	16	128.48
15	Paul Fentz	Germany	209.96	17	69.70	12	140.26
16	Vladimir Litvintsev	Azerbaijan	204.28	14	73.60	15	130.68
17	Aleksandr Selevko	Estonia	195.13	16	69.94	20	125.19
18	Sondre Oddvoll Bøe	Norway	192.01	20	66.03	18	125.98
19	Matyáš Bělohradský	Czech Republic	191.22	18	67.40	21	123.82
20	Luc Maierhofer	Austria	189.00	21	63.63	19	125.37
21	Graham Newberry	Great Britain	188.62	22	61.33	17	127.29
22	Ivan Shmuratko	Ukraine	178.29	19	67.26	24	111.03
23	Irakli Maysuradze	Georgia	174.43	24	60.89	22	113.54
24	Davide Lewton Brain	Monaco	173.61	23	61.07	23	112.54
Did not advance to Free Skating
25	Ihor Reznichenko	Poland	59.99	25	59.99	—N/a	
26	Slavik Hayrapetyan	Armenia	59.97	26	59.97	—N/a	
27	Nikolaj Majorov	Sweden	59.68	27	59.68	—N/a	
28	Burak Demirboğa	Turkey	56.95	28	56.95	—N/a	
29	Nicky Obreykov	Bulgaria	56.54	29	56.54	—N/a	
30	Yakau Zenko	Belarus	56.38	30	56.38	—N/a	
31	Lukas Britschgi	Switzerland	55.86	31	55.86	—N/a	
32	Roman Galay	Finland	55.40	32	55.40	—N/a	
33	Conor Stakelum	Ireland	55.03	33	55.03	—N/a	
34	Hector Alonso Serrano	Spain	53.94	34	53.94	—N/a	
35	Michael Neuman	Slovakia	53.38	35	53.38	—N/a	
36	Thomas Kennes	Netherlands	48.57	36	48.57	—N/a	
37	Alexander Borovoj	Hungary	46.56	37	46.56	—N/a	

=== Ladies ===
Rank	Name	Nation	Total points	SP		FS	
1	Sofia Samodurova	Russia	213.84	2	72.88	1	140.96
2	Alina Zagitova	Russia	198.34	1	75.00	4	123.34
3	Viveca Lindfors	Finland	194.40	4	65.61	3	128.79
4	Stanislava Konstantinova	Russia	189.72	11	56.76	2	132.96
5	Laurine Lecavelier	France	180.05	6	63.29	6	116.76
6	Alexia Paganini	Switzerland	179.90	3	65.64	7	114.26
7	Maé-Bérénice Méité	France	177.10	8	58.95	5	118.15
8	Emmi Peltonen	Finland	170.03	10	58.06	8	111.97
9	Nicole Rajičová	Slovakia	169.03	5	64.08	12	104.95
10	Eliška Březinová	Czech Republic	166.77	12	55.85	9	110.92
11	Alexandra Feigin	Bulgaria	164.20	9	58.80	11	105.40
12	Ekaterina Ryabova	Azerbaijan	163.17	7	59.95	13	103.22
13	Ivett Tóth	Hungary	160.83	13	54.90	10	105.93
14	Julia Sauter	Romania	153.15	14	54.29	15	98.86
15	Yasmine Kimiko Yamada	Switzerland	151.12	18	51.21	14	99.91
16	Nicole Schott	Germany	149.26	19	50.68	16	98.58
17	Daša Grm	Slovenia	147.29	15	53.50	17	93.79
18	Anita Östlund	Sweden	144.66	17	52.76	18	91.90
19	Lucrezia Gennaro	Italy	143.10	16	52.91	20	90.19
20	Natasha McKay	Great Britain	140.08	22	48.20	19	91.88
21	Nathalie Weinzierl	Germany	134.58	24	46.09	21	88.49
22	Anastasia Galustyan	Armenia	132.63	21	48.38	22	84.25
23	Pernille Sørensen	Denmark	131.78	20	50.59	23	81.19
24	Antonina Dubinina	Serbia	120.25	23	47.20	24	73.05
Did not advance to Free Skating
25	Elżbieta Gabryszak	Poland	45.77	25	45.77	—N/a	
26	Sophia Schaller	Austria	44.20	26	44.20	—N/a	
27	Gerli Liinamäe	Estonia	44.08	27	44.08	—N/a	
28	Kyarha van Tiel	Netherlands	44.00	28	44.00	—N/a	
29	Lara Naki Gutmann	Italy	43.96	29	43.96	—N/a	
30	Silvia Hugec	Slovakia	43.33	30	43.33	—N/a	
31	Valentina Matos	Spain	42.86	31	42.86	—N/a	
32	Paulina Ramanauskaitė	Lithuania	42.31	32	42.31	—N/a	
33	Camilla Gjersem	Norway	39.81	33	39.81	—N/a	
34	Hana Cvijanović	Croatia	38.00	34	38.00	—N/a	
35	Elizabete Jubkane	Latvia	37.75	35	37.75	—N/a	
36	Anastasia Gozhva	Ukraine	35.51	36	35.51	—N/a	

=== Pairs ===
Rank	Name	Nation	Total points	SP		FS	
1	Vanessa James / Morgan Ciprès	France	225.66	1	76.55	1	149.11
2	Evgenia Tarasova / Vladimir Morozov	Russia	218.82	2	73.90	2	144.92
3	Aleksandra Boikova / Dmitrii Kozlovskii	Russia	205.28	4	72.58	3	132.70
4	Nicole Della Monica / Matteo Guarise	Italy	205.14	3	73.70	4	131.44
5	Daria Pavliuchenko / Denis Khodykin	Russia	185.92	5	65.89	6	120.03
6	Minerva Fabienne Hase / Nolan Seegert	Germany	180.56	6	60.08	5	120.48
7	Laura Barquero / Aritz Maestu	Spain	160.16	9	53.89	7	106.27
8	Lana Petranović / Antonio Souza-Kordeiru	Croatia	151.89	10	50.99	8	100.90
9	Rebecca Ghilardi / Filippo Ambrosini	Italy	147.75	8	54.48	10	93.27
10	Zoe Jones / Christopher Boyadji	Great Britain	138.85	11	45.33	9	93.52
WD	Miriam Ziegler / Severin Kiefer	Austria	withdrew	7	57.70	withdrew from competition	

=== Ice dancing ===
Rank	Name	Nation	Total points	RD		FD	
1	Gabriella Papadakis / Guillaume Cizeron	France	217.98	1	84.79	1	133.19
2	Alexandra Stepanova / Ivan Bukin	Russia	206.41	2	81.37	2	125.04
3	Charlène Guignard / Marco Fabbri	Italy	199.84	3	79.05	4	120.79
4	Victoria Sinitsina / Nikita Katsalapov	Russia	193.95	5	70.24	3	123.71
5	Natalia Kaliszek / Maksym Spodyriev	Poland	185.35	4	72.87	5	112.48
6	Lilah Fear / Lewis Gibson	Great Britain	182.05	7	69.77	6	112.28
7	Sara Hurtado / Kirill Khaliavin	Spain	180.67	8	69.28	7	111.39
8	Olivia Smart / Adrián Díaz	Spain	176.84	6	70.02	9	106.82
9	Sofia Evdokimova / Egor Bazin	Russia	175.62	11	66.65	8	108.97
10	Marie-Jade Lauriault / Romain Le Gac	France	172.33	9	68.98	11	103.35
11	Juulia Turkkila / Matthias Versluis	Finland	168.34	10	67.18	12	101.16
12	Adelina Galyavieva / Louis Thauron	France	168.02	13	64.62	10	103.40
13	Allison Reed / Saulius Ambrulevičius	Lithuania	164.11	12	64.81	14	99.30
14	Jasmine Tessari / Francesco Fioretti	Italy	162.94	15	63.12	13	99.82
15	Shari Koch / Christian Nüchtern	Germany	159.81	14	63.45	15	96.36
16	Darya Popova / Volodymyr Byelikov	Ukraine	152.01	16	60.01	17	92.00
17	Robynne Tweedale / Joseph Buckland	Great Britain	149.66	18	57.38	16	92.28
18	Anna Kublikova / Yuri Hulitski	Belarus	147.51	19	57.08	18	90.43
19	Anna Yanovskaya / Ádám Lukács	Hungary	147.32	17	58.70	19	88.62
20	Shira Ichilov / Vadim Davidovich	Israel	142.12	20	54.92	20	87.20
Did not advance to Free Dance
21	Carolina Moscheni / Andrea Fabbri	Italy	54.20	21	54.20	—N/a	
22	Justyna Plutowska / Jérémie Flemin	Poland	52.08	22	52.08	—N/a	
23	Teodora Markova / Simon Daze	Bulgaria	52.07	23	52.07	—N/a	
24	Victoria Manni / Carlo Röthlisberger	Switzerland	50.63	24	50.63	—N/a	
25	Katerina Bunina / German Frolov	Estonia	44.82	25	44.82	—N/a	

== Medals summary ==
=== Medalists ===
Medals awarded to the skaters who achieve the highest overall placements in each discipline:

Discipline	Gold	Silver	Bronze
Men	(Spain) Javier Fernández	(Russia) Alexander Samarin	(Italy) Matteo Rizzo
Ladies	(Russia) Sofia Samodurova	(Russia) Alina Zagitova	(Finland) Viveca Lindfors
Pairs	(France) Vanessa James / Morgan Ciprès	(Russia) Evgenia Tarasova / Vladimir Morozov	(Russia) Aleksandra Boikova / Dmitrii Kozlovskii
Ice dancing	(France) Gabriella Papadakis / Guillaume Cizeron	(Russia) Alexandra Stepanova / Ivan Bukin	(Italy) Charlène Guignard / Marco Fabbri

Small medals awarded to the skaters who achieve the highest short program or rhythm dance placements in each discipline:

Discipline	Gold	Silver	Bronze
Men	(Russia) Mikhail Kolyada	(Russia) Alexander Samarin	(Spain) Javier Fernández
Ladies	(Russia) Alina Zagitova	(Russia) Sofia Samodurova	(Switzerland) Alexia Paganini
Pairs	(France) Vanessa James / Morgan Ciprès	(Russia) Evgenia Tarasova / Vladimir Morozov	(Italy) Nicole Della Monica / Matteo Guarise
Ice dancing	(France) Gabriella Papadakis / Guillaume Cizeron	(Russia) Alexandra Stepanova / Ivan Bukin	(Italy) Charlène Guignard / Marco Fabbri

Medals awarded to the skaters who achieve the highest free skating or free dance placements in each discipline:

Discipline	Gold	Silver	Bronze
Men	(Spain) Javier Fernández	(Russia) Alexander Samarin	(Italy) Matteo Rizzo
Ladies	(Russia) Sofia Samodurova	(Russia) Stanislava Konstantinova	(Finland) Viveca Lindfors
Pairs	(France) Vanessa James / Morgan Ciprès	(Russia) Evgenia Tarasova / Vladimir Morozov	(Russia) Aleksandra Boikova / Dmitrii Kozlovskii
Ice dancing	(France) Gabriella Papadakis / Guillaume Cizeron	(Russia) Alexandra Stepanova / Ivan Bukin	(Russia) Victoria Sinitsina / Nikita Katsalapov

=== Medals by country ===
Table of medals for overall placement:

Rank	Nation	Gold	Silver	Bronze	Total
1	France	2	0	0	2
2	Russia	1	4	1	6
3	Spain	1	0	0	1
4	Italy	0	0	2	2
5	Finland	0	0	1	1
Totals (5 entries)		4	4	4	12

Table of small medals for placement in the short segment:

Rank	Nation	Gold	Silver	Bronze	Total
1	Russia	2	4	0	6
2	France	2	0	0	2
3	Italy	0	0	2	2
4	Spain	0	0	1	1
4	Switzerland	0	0	1	1
Totals (5 entries)		4	4	4	12

Table of small medals for placement in the free segment:

Rank	Nation	Gold	Silver	Bronze	Total
1	France	2	0	0	2
2	Russia	1	4	2	7
3	Spain	1	0	0	1
4	Finland	0	0	1	1
4	Italy	0	0	1	1
Totals (5 entries)		4	4	4	12

== Prize money ==
Prize money is awarded to skaters who achieve a Top 6 placement in each discipline as follows:

	Prize money (US$)	
Placement	Men's / Ladies' singles	Pairs / Ice Dance
1st	21,000	30,000
2nd	16,000	20,000
3rd	11,000	12,000
4th	7,000	10,000
5th	5,000	7,000
6th	3,000	5,000
Total prize money: US$294,000.

== See also ==
- Belarus
