= 2018 European Figure Skating Championships =

Figure skating competition

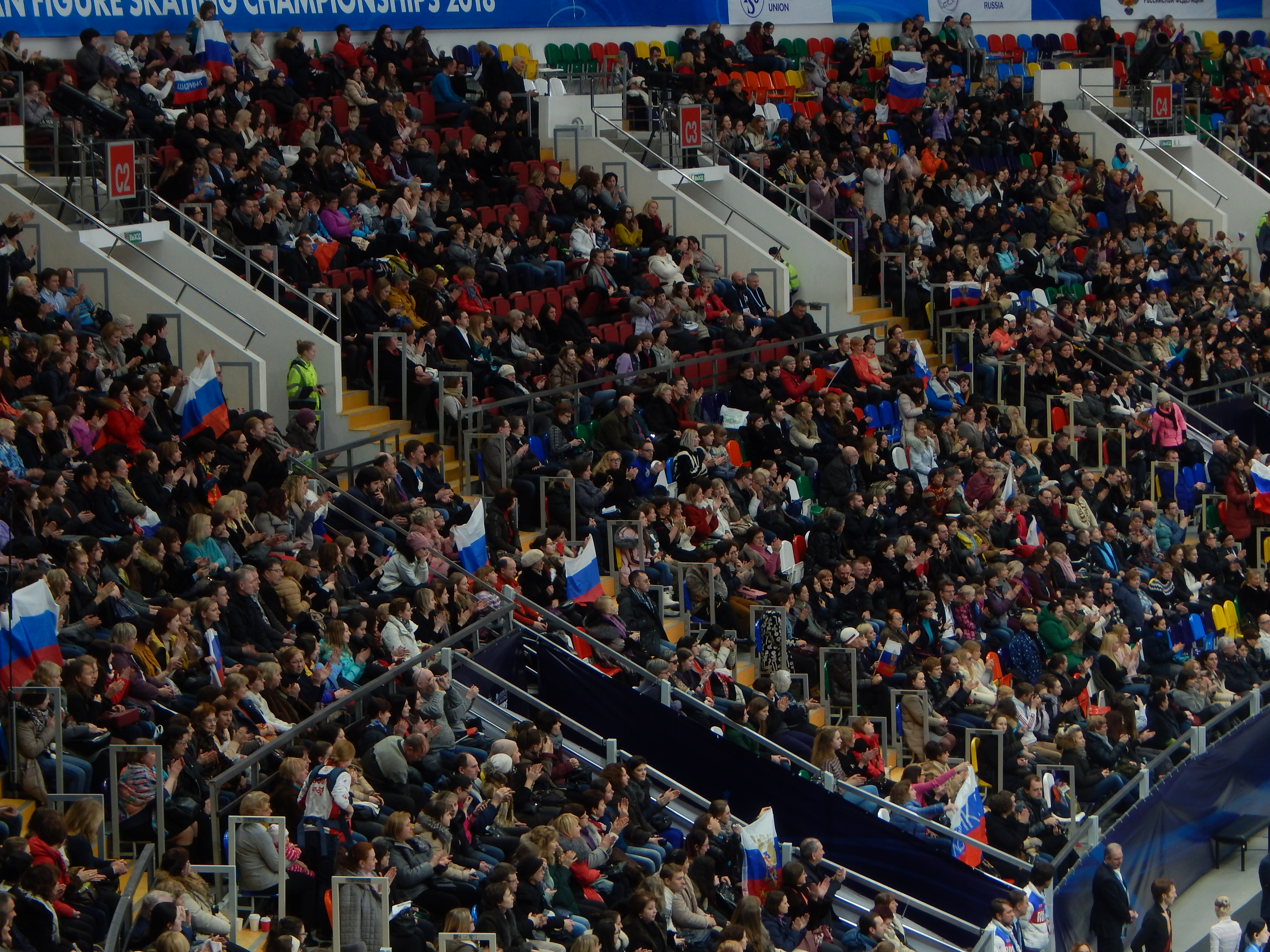
- Megasport Arena during the first competitive day
- Type: ISU Championship
- Date: 15-21 January 2018
- Season: 2017–18
- Location: Moscow, Russia
- Venue: Megasport Sport Palace

Champions
- Men's singles: (Spain) Javier Fernández
- Ladies' singles: (Russia) Alina Zagitova
- Pairs: (Russia) Evgenia Tarasova / Vladimir Morozov
- Ice dance: (France) Gabriella Papadakis / Guillaume Cizeron
- Previous: 2017 European Championships
- Next: 2019 European Championships

The 2018 European Figure Skating Championships were held in January 2018 in Moscow, Russia. Medals were awarded in the disciplines of men's singles, ladies' singles, pairs, and ice dance.

== Records ==
The following new ISU best scores were set during this competition:

Event	Component	Skater(s)	Score	Date	Ref
Ice dance	Free dance	(France) Gabriella Papadakis / Guillaume Cizeron	121.87	20 January 2018	
Ice dance	Total score	(France) Gabriella Papadakis / Guillaume Cizeron	203.16	20 January 2018	

== Eligibility ==
Skaters were eligible for the event if they represented a European member nation of the International Skating Union and had reached the age of 15 before July 1, 2017, in their place of birth. The corresponding competition for non-European skaters is the 2018 Four Continents Championships. National associations selected their entries according to their own criteria but the ISU mandated that their selections achieve a minimum technical elements score (TES) at an international event prior to the European Championships.

=== Minimum TES ===
The ISU stipulates that the minimum scores must be achieved at an ISU-recognized senior international competition in the ongoing or preceding season, no later than 21 days before the first official practice day.

Minimum technical scores (TES)
Discipline	SP / SD	FS / FD
Men	25	45
Ladies	20	36
Pairs	20	36
Ice dance	19	29
SP and FS scores may be attained at different events.

=== Number of entries per discipline ===
Based on the results of the 2017 European Championships, the ISU allows each country one to three entries per discipline.

Spots	Men	Ladies	Pairs	Dance
3	Russia	Italy; Russia	Russia	France; Italy; Russia
2	Belgium; Czech Republic; France; Georgia; Germany; Israel; Latvia; Spain	Belgium; Finland; France; Germany; Hungary; Slovakia; Sweden	Austria; Belarus; Czech Republic; France; Germany; Italy	Denmark; Israel; Poland; Ukraine
If not listed above, one entry is allowed.

== Entries ==
Member nations began announcing their selections in December 2017. The ISU published a complete list on 27 December 2017:

Country	Men	Ladies	Pairs	Ice dance
Armenia	Slavik Hayrapetyan			Tina Garabedian / Simon Proulx-Sénécal
Austria		Natalie Klotz	Miriam Ziegler / Severin Kiefer	
Azerbaijan	Larry Loupolover	Kim Cheremsky	Sofiya Karagodina / Semyon Stepanov	
Belarus	Yakau Zenko			Viktoria Kavaliova / Yurii Bieliaiev
Belgium	Jorik Hendrickx	Loena Hendrickx; Charlotte Vandersarren		
Bulgaria	Nicky Obreykov	Presiyana Dimitrova		Teodora Markova / Simon Daze
Croatia	Nicholas Vrdoljak		Lana Petranović / Antonio Souza-Kordeiru	
Czech Republic	Jiří Bělohradský; Michal Březina	Eliška Březinová		Cortney Mansour / Michal Češka
Denmark		Pernille Sørensen		Laurence Fournier Beaudry / Nikolaj Sørensen
Estonia	Daniel Albert Naurits	Kristina Škuleta-Gromova		Katerina Bunina / German Frolov
Finland	Valtter Virtanen	Viveca Lindfors; Emmi Peltonen		Cecilia Törn / Jussiville Partanen
France	Chafik Besseghier; Romain Ponsart	Laurine Lecavelier; Maé-Bérénice Méité	Lola Esbrat / Andrei Novoselov; Vanessa James / Morgan Cipres	Angélique Abachkina / Louis Thauron; Marie-Jade Lauriault / Romain Le Gac; Gabriella Papadakis / Guillaume Cizeron
Georgia	Morisi Kvitelashvili; Irakli Maysuradze			
Germany	Paul Fentz; Peter Liebers	Lea Johanna Dastich; Nicole Schott	Annika Hocke / Ruben Blommaert	Kavita Lorenz / Joti Polizoakis
Great Britain	Phillip Harris	Natasha McKay		Penny Coomes / Nicholas Buckland
Hungary	Alexander Maszljanko	Fruzsina Medgyesi; Ivett Tóth		Anna Yanovskaya / Ádám Lukács
Ireland	Conor Stakelum			
Israel	Oleksii Bychenko; Daniel Samohin	Aimee Buchanan	Paige Conners / Evgeni Krasnopolski	Adel Tankova / Ronald Zilberberg
Italy	Matteo Rizzo	Micol Cristini; Carolina Kostner; Giada Russo	Nicole Della Monica / Matteo Guarise; Valentina Marchei / Ondřej Hotárek	Anna Cappellini / Luca Lanotte; Charlène Guignard / Marco Fabbri; Jasmine Tessari / Francesco Fioretti
Latvia	Deniss Vasiļjevs	Diāna Ņikitina		Aurelija Ipolito / Malcolm Jones
Lithuania		Elžbieta Kropa		Guostė Damulevičiūtė / Deividas Kizala
Monaco	Davide Lewton Brain			
Netherlands	Thomas Kennes	Kyarha van Tiel		
Norway	Sondre Oddvoll Bøe	Anne Line Gjersem		
Poland	Ihor Reznichenko	Elżbieta Gabryszak		Natalia Kaliszek / Maksym Spodyriev; Justyna Plutowska / Jeremie Flemin
Romania		Julia Sauter		
Russia	Dmitri Aliev; Mikhail Kolyada; Alexander Samarin	Evgenia Medvedeva; Maria Sotskova; Alina Zagitova	Ksenia Stolbova / Fedor Klimov; Evgenia Tarasova / Vladimir Morozov; Natalia Zabiiako / Alexander Enbert	Ekaterina Bobrova / Dmitri Soloviev; Alexandra Stepanova / Ivan Bukin; Tiffany Zahorski / Jonathan Guerreiro
Serbia		Antonina Dubinina		
Slovakia	Michael Neuman	Nicole Rajičová; Silvia Hugec		Lucie Myslivečková / Lukáš Csölley
Slovenia		Daša Grm		
Spain	Javier Fernández; Felipe Montoya	Valentina Matos	Laura Barquero / Aritz Maestu	Sara Hurtado / Kirill Khaliavin
Sweden	Alexander Majorov	Matilda Algotsson; Anita Östlund		Malin Malmberg / Thomas Nordahl
Switzerland	Stéphane Walker	Alexia Paganini	Ioulia Chtchetinina / Mikhail Akulov	Victoria Manni / Carlo Röthlisberger
Turkey	Burak Ali Artan	Sıla Saygı		Alisa Agafonova / Alper Uçar
Ukraine	Yaroslav Paniot	Anna Khnychenkova		Darya Popova / Volodymyr Byelikov; Oleksandra Nazarova / Maxim Nikitin

=== Changes to initial assignments ===
Announced	Country	Discipline	Initial	Replacement	Reason/Other notes
3 January 2018	Czech Republic	Pairs	Anna Dušková / Martin Bidař	None	
8 January 2018	Lithuania	Ice dance	Allison Reed / Saulius Ambrulevičius	Guostė Damulevičiūtė / Deividas Kizala	
8 January 2018	Lithuania	Ladies	Greta Morkytė	Elžbieta Kropa	
10 January 2018	France	Men	Kevin Aymoz	Romain Ponsart	
12 January 2018	Germany	Pairs	Aliona Savchenko / Bruno Massot	None	
14 January 2018	Armenia	Ladies	Anastasia Galustyan	None	
14 January 2018	Great Britain	Pairs	Zoe Jones / Christopher Boyadji	None	

== Results ==
=== Men ===
Rank	Name	Nation	Total points	SP		FS	
1	Javier Fernández	Spain	295.55	1	103.82	1	191.73
2	Dmitri Aliev	Russia	274.06	2	91.33	2	182.73
3	Mikhail Kolyada	Russia	258.90	4	83.41	3	175.49
4	Deniss Vasiļjevs	Latvia	243.52	3	85.11	5	158.41
5	Oleksii Bychenko	Israel	238.44	8	74.97	4	163.47
6	Alexander Samarin	Russia	229.81	9	74.25	6	155.56
7	Alexander Majorov	Sweden	225.86	12	71.28	7	154.58
8	Michal Březina	Czech Republic	225.20	10	72.72	8	152.48
9	Matteo Rizzo	Italy	219.43	6	78.26	9	141.17
10	Jorik Hendrickx	Belgium	218.17	5	78.56	12	139.61
11	Chafik Besseghier	France	211.17	13	70.35	10	140.82
12	Morisi Kvitelashvili	Georgia	210.47	7	76.74	14	133.73
13	Phillip Harris	Great Britain	208.22	15	67.77	11	140.45
14	Romain Ponsart	France	200.72	20	61.45	13	139.27
15	Slavik Hayrapetyan	Armenia	196.63	14	69.49	16	127.14
16	Paul Fentz	Germany	194.97	11	72.54	17	122.43
17	Irakli Maysuradze	Georgia	191.22	18	63.69	15	127.53
18	Stéphane Walker	Switzerland	185.41	16	65.96	20	119.45
19	Valtter Virtanen	Finland	181.77	24	60.23	18	121.54
20	Felipe Montoya	Spain	181.72	22	61.23	19	120.49
21	Daniel Albert Naurits	Estonia	176.10	23	60.76	21	115.34
22	Sondre Oddvoll Bøe	Norway	170.64	19	61.85	22	108.79
23	Burak Demirboga	Turkey	167.22	21	61.27	23	105.95
24	Ihor Reznichenko	Poland	165.65	17	63.96	24	101.69
Did not advance to free skating
25	Yaroslav Paniot	Ukraine	60.07	25	60.07	—N/a	
26	Daniel Samohin	Israel	59.18	26	59.18	—N/a	
27	Nicholas Vrdoljak	Croatia	58.30	27	58.30	—N/a	
28	Jiří Bělohradský	Czech Republic	58.30	28	58.30	—N/a	
29	Michael Neuman	Slovakia	57.44	29	57.44	—N/a	
30	Thomas Kennes	Netherlands	54.65	30	54.65	—N/a	
31	Davide Lewton Brain	Monaco	54.64	31	54.64	—N/a	
32	Larry Loupolover	Azerbaijan	52.44	32	52.44	—N/a	
33	Alexander Maszljanko	Hungary	52.01	33	52.01	—N/a	
34	Nicky Obreykov	Bulgaria	50.24	34	50.24	—N/a	
35	Yakau Zenko	Belarus	47.26	35	47.26	—N/a	
36	Conor Stakelum	Ireland	43.05	36	43.05	—N/a	
WD	Peter Liebers	Germany	withdrew from competition				

=== Ladies ===
Rank	Name	Nation	Total points	SP		FS	
1	Alina Zagitova	Russia	238.24	1	80.27	1	157.97
2	Evgenia Medvedeva	Russia	232.86	2	78.57	2	154.29
3	Carolina Kostner	Italy	204.25	3	78.30	4	125.95
4	Maria Sotskova	Russia	200.81	4	68.70	3	132.11
5	Loena Hendrickx	Belgium	176.91	8	55.13	5	121.78
6	Nicole Rajičová	Slovakia	171.90	5	61.01	6	110.89
7	Alexia Paganini	Switzerland	161.62	9	54.95	9	106.67
8	Maé-Bérénice Méité	France	159.70	10	54.14	10	105.56
9	Emmi Peltonen	Finland	159.48	11	52.68	8	106.80
10	Nicole Schott	Germany	157.84	18	48.37	7	109.47
11	Laurine Lecavelier	France	154.11	7	55.36	12	98.75
12	Eliška Březinová	Czech Republic	149.69	12	52.06	14	97.63
13	Ivett Tóth	Hungary	148.98	15	50.70	13	98.28
14	Viveca Lindfors	Finland	147.89	14	51.62	17	96.27
15	Micol Cristini	Italy	147.80	19	48.22	11	99.58
16	Lea Johanna Dastich	Germany	146.82	16	49.89	15	96.93
17	Anita Östlund	Sweden	145.14	6	56.04	20	89.10
18	Anne Line Gjersem	Norway	142.68	17	48.70	18	93.98
19	Giada Russo	Italy	142.38	23	45.81	16	96.57
20	Daša Grm	Slovenia	137.31	20	47.40	19	89.91
21	Pernille Sørensen	Denmark	133.94	24	45.76	21	88.18
22	Elžbieta Kropa	Lithuania	133.87	21	46.06	22	87.81
23	Anna Khnychenkova	Ukraine	132.70	13	51.84	23	80.86
24	Silvia Hugec	Slovakia	123.45	22	45.98	24	77.47
Did not advance to free skating
25	Kristina Škuleta-Gromova	Estonia	45.74	25	45.74	—N/a	
26	Kyarha van Tiel	Netherlands	45.28	26	45.28	—N/a	
27	Natasha McKay	Great Britain	45.12	27	45.12	—N/a	
28	Fruzsina Medgyesi	Hungary	44.71	28	44.71	—N/a	
29	Julia Sauter	Romania	44.57	29	44.57	—N/a	
30	Natalie Klotz	Austria	43.53	30	43.53	—N/a	
31	Matilda Algotsson	Sweden	43.28	31	43.28	—N/a	
32	Sıla Saygı	Turkey	43.05	32	43.05	—N/a	
33	Valentina Matos	Spain	39.66	33	39.66	—N/a	
34	Elżbieta Gabryszak	Poland	38.00	34	38.00	—N/a	
35	Kim Cheremsky	Azerbaijan	37.61	35	37.61	—N/a	
36	Diāna Ņikitina	Latvia	36.71	36	36.71	—N/a	
37	Antonina Dubinina	Serbia	36.69	37	36.69	—N/a	
38	Aimee Buchanan	Israel	33.87	38	33.87	—N/a	
39	Presiyana Dimitrova	Bulgaria	24.76	39	24.76	—N/a	
WD	Charlotte Vandersarren	Belgium	withdrew from competition				

=== Pairs ===
Rank	Name	Nation	Total points	SP		FS	
1	Evgenia Tarasova / Vladimir Morozov	Russia	221.60	5	70.37	1	151.23
2	Ksenia Stolbova / Fedor Klimov	Russia	211.01	3	72.05	2	138.96
3	Natalia Zabiiako / Alexander Enbert	Russia	210.18	2	72.95	3	137.23
4	Vanessa James / Morgan Ciprès	France	210.17	1	75.52	4	134.65
5	Valentina Marchei / Ondřej Hotárek	Italy	204.20	4	71.89	5	132.31
6	Nicole Della Monica / Matteo Guarise	Italy	192.38	6	64.53	6	127.85
7	Miriam Ziegler / Severin Kiefer	Austria	181.75	7	63.94	7	117.81
8	Annika Hocke / Ruben Blommaert	Germany	170.21	9	57.05	8	113.16
9	Paige Conners / Evgeni Krasnopolski	Israel	163.55	10	52.32	9	111.23
10	Lola Esbrat / Andrei Novoselov	France	160.47	8	57.48	10	102.99
11	Laura Barquero / Aritz Maestu	Spain	152.08	11	51.46	11	100.62
12	Lana Petranović / Antonio Souza-Kordeiru	Croatia	134.97	13	45.72	12	89.25
13	Ioulia Chtchetinina / Mikhail Akulov	Switzerland	130.09	12	46.57	13	83.52
14	Sofiya Karagodina / Semyon Stepanov	Azerbaijan	117.95	14	41.58	14	76.37

=== Ice dance ===
Rank	Name	Nation	Total points	SD		FD	
1	Gabriella Papadakis / Guillaume Cizeron	France	203.16	1	81.29	1	121.87
2	Ekaterina Bobrova / Dmitri Soloviev	Russia	187.13	4	74.43	2	112.70
3	Alexandra Stepanova / Ivan Bukin	Russia	184.86	2	75.38	3	109.48
4	Anna Cappellini / Luca Lanotte	Italy	180.65	3	74.76	5	105.89
5	Charlène Guignard / Marco Fabbri	Italy	177.75	5	71.58	4	106.17
6	Tiffany Zahorski / Jonathan Guerreiro	Russia	168.45	8	65.35	6	103.10
7	Penny Coomes / Nicholas Buckland	Great Britain	168.42	6	69.45	9	98.97
8	Sara Hurtado / Kirill Khaliavin	Spain	165.03	7	66.60	10	98.43
9	Laurence Fournier Beaudry / Nikolaj Sørensen	Denmark	164.90	9	65.03	7	99.87
10	Natalia Kaliszek / Maksym Spodyriev	Poland	164.48	10	64.80	8	99.68
11	Oleksandra Nazarova / Maxim Nikitin	Ukraine	156.35	11	63.20	12	93.15
12	Marie-Jade Lauriault / Romain Le Gac	France	154.04	14	58.99	11	95.05
13	Alisa Agafonova / Alper Uçar	Turkey	152.10	12	59.30	13	92.80
14	Anna Yanovskaya / Ádám Lukács	Hungary	148.69	13	59.13	14	89.56
15	Cecilia Törn / Jussiville Partanen	Finland	145.60	16	57.73	15	87.87
16	Angélique Abachkina / Louis Thauron	France	139.74	15	58.14	17	81.60
17	Lucie Myslivečková / Lukáš Csölley	Slovakia	136.51	17	54.71	16	81.80
18	Jasmine Tessari / Francesco Fioretti	Italy	133.00	18	54.25	19	78.75
19	Tina Garabedian / Simon Proulx-Sénécal	Armenia	131.30	20	51.77	18	79.53
20	Viktoria Kavaliova / Yurii Bieliaiev	Belarus	128.38	19	53.64	20	74.74
Did not advance to free dance
21	Justyna Plutowska / Jeremie Flemin	Poland	49.91	21	49.91	—N/a	
22	Darya Popova / Volodymyr Byelikov	Ukraine	46.68	22	46.68	—N/a	
23	Victoria Manni / Carlo Röthlisberger	Switzerland	46.30	23	46.30	—N/a	
24	Guostė Damulevičiūtė / Deividas Kizala	Lithuania	45.12	24	45.12	—N/a	
25	Cortney Mansour / Michal Češka	Czech Republic	43.37	25	43.37	—N/a	
26	Teodora Markova / Simon Daze	Bulgaria	41.99	26	41.99	—N/a	
27	Katerina Bunina / German Frolov	Estonia	41.53	27	41.53	—N/a	
28	Adel Tankova / Ronald Zilberberg	Israel	40.20	28	40.20	—N/a	
29	Aurelija Ipolito / Malcolm Jones	Latvia	37.47	29	37.47	—N/a	
30	Malin Malmberg / Thomas Nordahl	Sweden	34.95	30	34.95	—N/a	
WD	Kavita Lorenz / Joti Polizoakis	Germany	withdrew from competition				

== Medals summary ==
=== Medals by country ===
Table of medals for overall placement:

Rank	Nation	Gold	Silver	Bronze	Total
1	Russia (RUS)	2	4	3	9
2	France (FRA)	1	0	0	1
2	Spain (ESP)	1	0	0	1
4	Italy (ITA)	0	0	1	1
Totals (4 entries)		4	4	4	12

Table of small medals for placement in the short segment:

Rank	Nation	Gold	Silver	Bronze	Total
1	France (FRA)	2	0	0	2
2	Russia (RUS)	1	4	1	6
3	Spain (ESP)	1	0	0	1
4	Italy (ITA)	0	0	2	2
5	Latvia (LAT)	0	0	1	1
Totals (5 entries)		4	4	4	12

Table of small medals for placement in the free segment:

Rank	Nation	Gold	Silver	Bronze	Total
1	Russia (RUS)	2	4	4	10
2	France (FRA)	1	0	0	1
2	Spain (ESP)	1	0	0	1
Totals (3 entries)		4	4	4	12

=== Medalists ===
Medals for overall placement

Discipline	Gold	Silver	Bronze
Men	(Spain) Javier Fernández	(Russia) Dmitri Aliev	(Russia) Mikhail Kolyada
Ladies	(Russia) Alina Zagitova	(Russia) Evgenia Medvedeva	(Italy) Carolina Kostner
Pairs	(Russia) Evgenia Tarasova / Vladimir Morozov	(Russia) Ksenia Stolbova / Fedor Klimov	(Russia) Natalia Zabiiako / Alexander Enbert
Ice dance	(France) Gabriella Papadakis / Guillaume Cizeron	(Russia) Ekaterina Bobrova / Dmitri Soloviev	(Russia) Alexandra Stepanova / Ivan Bukin

Small medals for placement in the short segment

Discipline	Gold	Silver	Bronze
Men	(Spain) Javier Fernández	(Russia) Dmitri Aliev	(Latvia) Deniss Vasiļjevs
Ladies	(Russia) Alina Zagitova	(Russia) Evgenia Medvedeva	(Italy) Carolina Kostner
Pairs	(France) Vanessa James / Morgan Ciprès	(Russia) Natalia Zabiiako / Alexander Enbert	(Russia) Ksenia Stolbova / Fedor Klimov
Ice dance	(France) Gabriella Papadakis / Guillaume Cizeron	(Russia) Alexandra Stepanova / Ivan Bukin	(Italy) Anna Cappellini / Luca Lanotte

Small medals for placement in the free segment

Discipline	Gold	Silver	Bronze
Men	(Spain) Javier Fernández	(Russia) Dmitri Aliev	(Russia) Mikhail Kolyada
Ladies	(Russia) Alina Zagitova	(Russia) Evgenia Medvedeva	(Russia) Maria Sotskova
Pairs	(Russia) Evgenia Tarasova / Vladimir Morozov	(Russia) Ksenia Stolbova / Fedor Klimov	(Russia) Natalia Zabiiako / Alexander Enbert
Ice dance	(France) Gabriella Papadakis / Guillaume Cizeron	(Russia) Ekaterina Bobrova / Dmitri Soloviev	(Russia) Alexandra Stepanova / Ivan Bukin
