= Viveca Lindfors (figure skater) =

Finnish figure skater (born 1999)

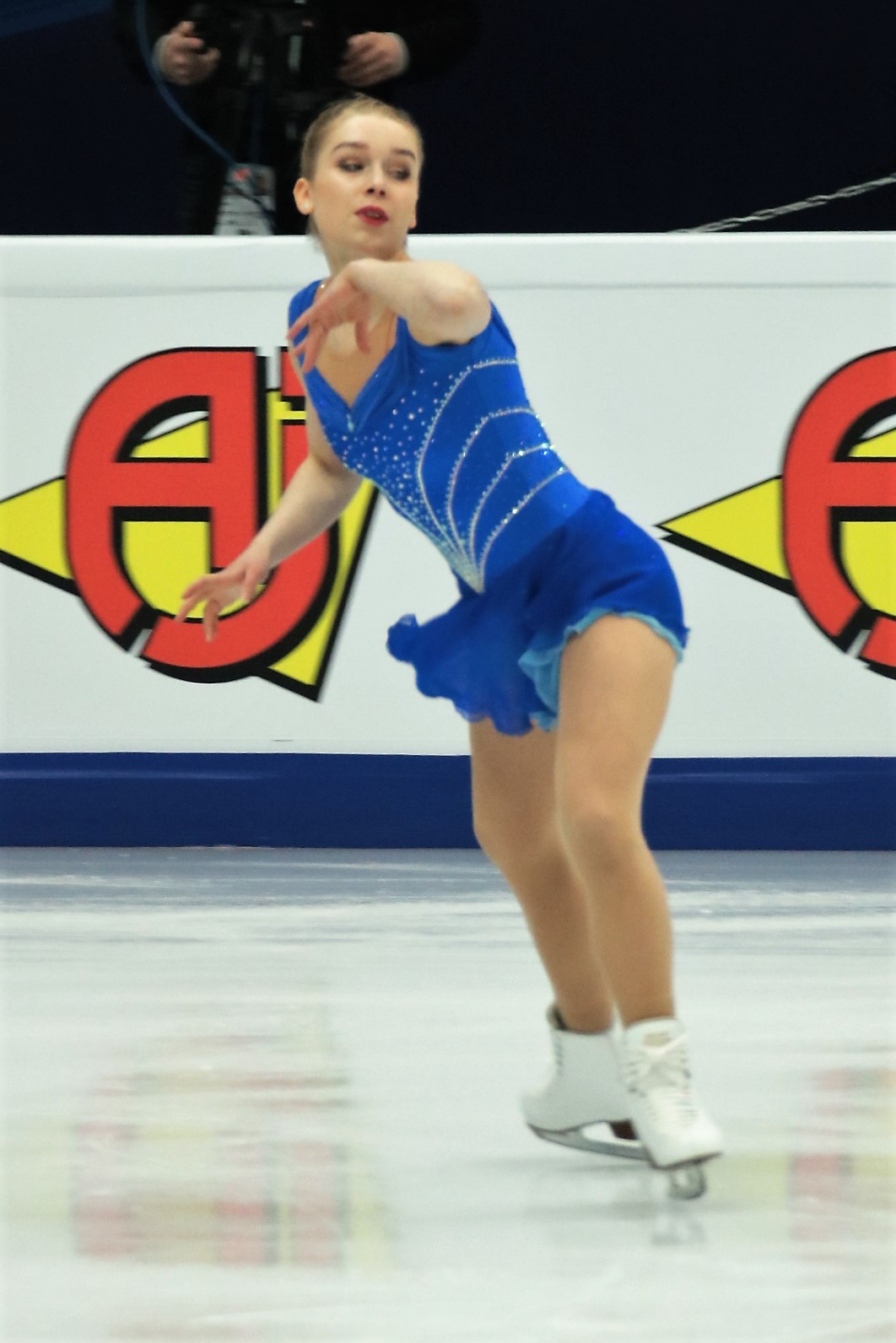
- Lindfors in 2018

Personal information
- Born: 30 January 1999 (age 27) Helsinki, Finland
- Home town: Helsinki
- Height: 1.59 m (5 ft 2 1/2 in)

Figure skating career
- Country: Finland
- Skating club: Espoon Jäätaiturit
- Began skating: 2004
- Retired: 2020
Medal record
Representing Finland
Figure skating: Ladies' singles
European Championships
Bronze medal – third place	2019 Minsk	Ladies’ Singles

Viveca Lindfors (born 30 January 1999) is a Finnish retired figure skater. She is the 2019 European bronze medalist, 2018 CS Finlandia Trophy bronze medalist, 2018 CS Tallinn Trophy bronze medalist, 2018 Nordic champion, and the 2019 Finnish national champion.

== Personal life ==
Viveca Lindfors was born on 30 January 1999 in Helsinki, Finland. She is the second eldest of five children. Her younger sisters, Monica and Fanny, and younger brother, Matias, have competed in figure skating, while her elder brother, Axel, is a hockey player. Monica Lindfors is the 2017 Finnish Junior ice dance champion with Juho Pirinen.

== Career ==
=== Early career ===
Lindfors began learning to skate in 2004. She competed on the advanced novice level in the 2012–2013 season, winning silver at the Finnish Championships and bronze at the Triglav Trophy.

In 2013–2014, Lindfors moved up to the junior level. After taking bronze at the Finnish Championships, she won gold medals at Skate Helena and the Dragon Trophy.

=== 2014–2015 season: Senior debut ===
Coached by Virpi Horttana at Espoon Jäätaiturit, Lindfors debuted on the ISU Junior Grand Prix (JGP) series, placing eighteenth at an October event in Zagreb, Croatia. She spent the rest of the season competing on the senior level. Appearing at her first ISU Challenger Series (CS) event, she finished tenth at the Warsaw Cup in November. After becoming the Finnish senior national bronze medalist, Lindfors won gold at Skate Helena and bronze at The Nordics. She concluded her season at the Hellmut Seibt Memorial, where she finished fourth.

=== 2015–2016 season: Debut at Worlds and Europeans ===
Starting her season on the JGP series, Lindfors placed eleventh in Riga, Latvia and ninth in Toruń, Poland. She then competed at a pair of CS events, finishing fifth at the 2015 Finlandia Trophy and fourth at the 2015 Tallinn Trophy. In December, she finished fourth at the Finnish Championships, only 0.13 behind the bronze medal winner after winning the short program and placing fourth in the free skate. As the Finnish lady with the highest season's best, she was selected to compete at the 2016 European Championships in Bratislava, Slovakia. She qualified for the free skate by placing eleventh in the short program and finished eighth overall in her ISU Championship debut. She won the silver medal at the 2016 Nordics Open.

In March, Lindfors placed twenty-fifth in the short program at the 2016 World Junior Championships in Debrecen, Hungary; she missed the cut-off for the free skate by one spot. In April, she finished twentieth at the 2016 World Championships in Boston after placing twenty-third in the short and sixteenth in the free.

=== 2016–2017 season ===
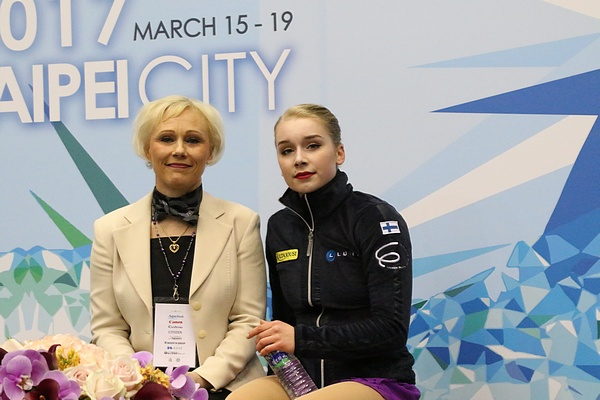
Lindfors and coach Horttana at the 2017 Junior World Championships

Lindfors had a back problem in the summer and autumn of 2016. She started her season by placing eleventh at the 2016 CS Lombardia Trophy and tenth at the 2016 CS Finlandia Trophy. At the 2017 Finnish Championships she won the bronze medal behind Emmi Peltonen and Jenni Saarinen, placing second in the short program and third in the free skate. She finished twenty-third at the 2017 European Championships in Ostrava, Czech Republic. She stated that she had a heart problem.

=== 2017–2018 season ===
After placing tenth at the 2017 ISU Junior Grand Prix in Latvia, Lindfors competed at the 2017 CS Nebelhorn Trophy, the final qualifying opportunity for the 2018 Winter Olympics. Due to her result, sixth, Finland received a spot in the Olympic ladies' event. In December, she finished second to Emmi Peltonen at the Finnish Championships.

In January, Lindfors placed fourteenth, five spots below Peltonen, at the 2018 European Championships in Moscow. Peltonen, therefore, was selected to represent Finland at the Olympics. Lindfors was assigned to the 2018 World Championships in Milan, where she placed sixteenth.

=== 2018–2019 season: European bronze medal ===
Lindfors started her season at the 2018 CS Lombardia Trophy, placing third in the short program, sixth in the free, and fifth overall. In October, she won her first-ever Challenger Series medal – bronze at the 2018 CS Finlandia Trophy. In November, she made her senior Grand Prix debut, placing eighth at the 2018 Grand Prix of Helsinki, and won bronze at the 2018 CS Tallinn Trophy. The following month, she took gold at the Finnish Championships.

In January, at the 2019 European Championships in Minsk, Lindfors placed fourth in the short program, 0.03 points behind Alexia Paganini. In the free skate, she placed third, behind Sofia Samodurova and Stanislava Konstantinova, and won the bronze medal overall. She was the first Finnish skater to stand on the European podium since Kiira Korpi took silver in 2012. Speaking afterward, Lindfors said "It feels a bit surreal because I have wanted this, but at the same time I can't believe it's true."

Lindfors was named as Finland's sole ladies' entry to the 2019 World Championships in Saitama, but she subsequently withdrew due to injury.

=== 2019–2020 season: Injury and retirement ===
Lindfors initially planned to compete at the 2019 CS Finlandia Trophy, but withdrew due to ongoing back problems. She subsequently withdrew from both of her Grand Prix assignments as well.

In late July, she announced her retirement from competitive figure skating, citing the fact that she was unable to train at an elite level because of her back problems, and announced that she would be attending University of Turku in the fall.

== Programs ==
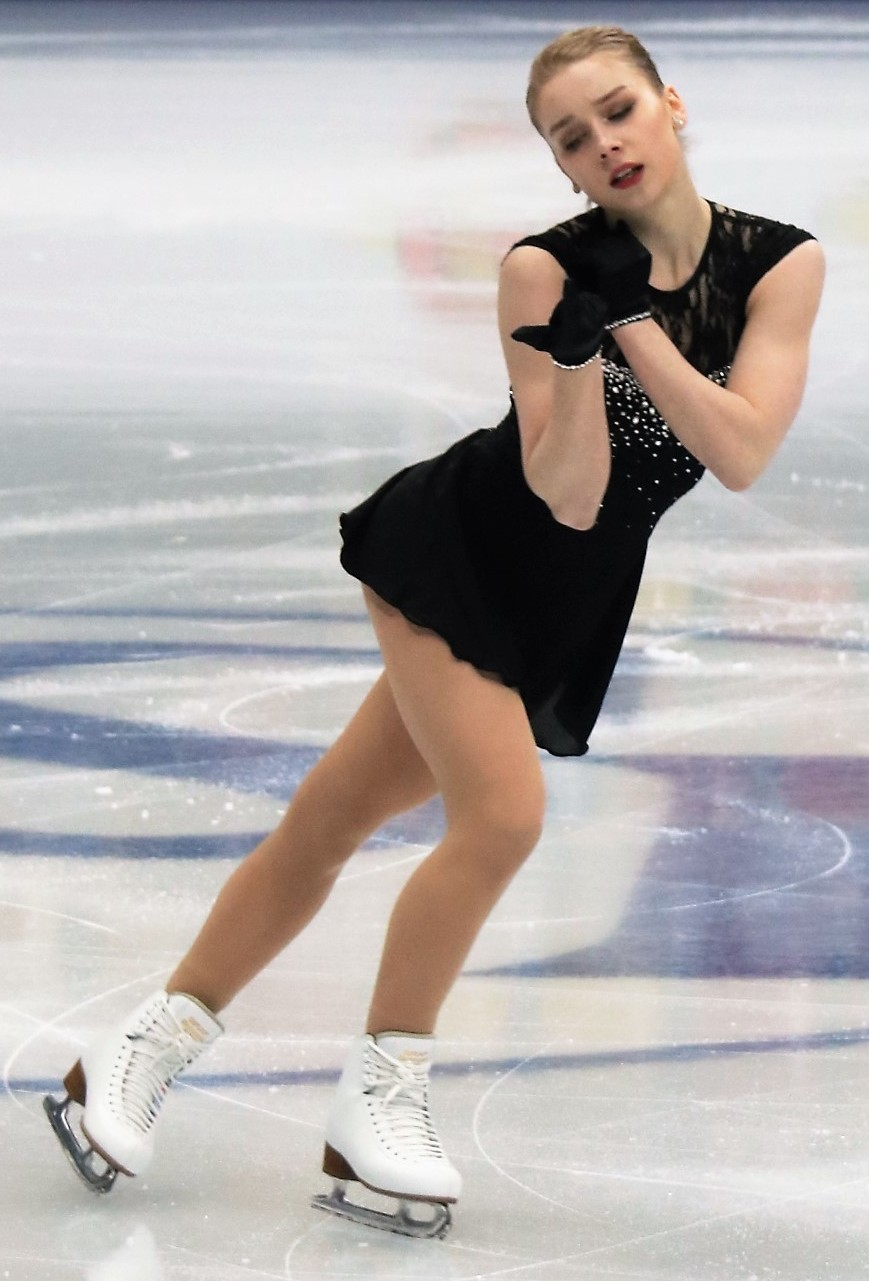
Lindfors at the 2018 European Championships

Season	Short program	Free skating
2018–2019	Wishing You Were Somehow Here Again (from Phantom of the Opera) by Andrew Lloyd Webber	At the End of the Day; I Dreamed a Dream (from Les Misérables) By Claude-Michel Schönberg
2017–2018	Wishing You Were Somehow Here Again (from Phantom of the Opera) by Andrew Lloyd Webber	Cinderella by Patrick Doyle
2016–2017	Persian Dance (from The Snow Queen) by Tuomas Kantelinen choreo. by Sari Hakola	Don't Cry for Me Argentina (from Evita) by Andrew Lloyd Webber performed by Madonna; I See You (from Avatar) by James Horner performed by Leona Lewis choreo. by Stéphane Lambiel
2015–2016	Persian Dance (from The Snow Queen) by Tuomas Kantelinen choreo. by Sari Hakola	Don't Cry for Me Argentina (from Evita) by Andrew Lloyd Webber performed by Madonna choreo. by Sari Hakola
2014–2015	Titanium performed by The Piano Guys, Alexander Goldstein choreo. by Sari Hakola	Don't Cry for Me Argentina (from Evita) by Andrew Lloyd Webber performed by Madonna choreo. by Sari Hakola

== Competitive highlights ==
GP: Grand Prix; CS: Challenger Series; JGP: Junior Grand Prix

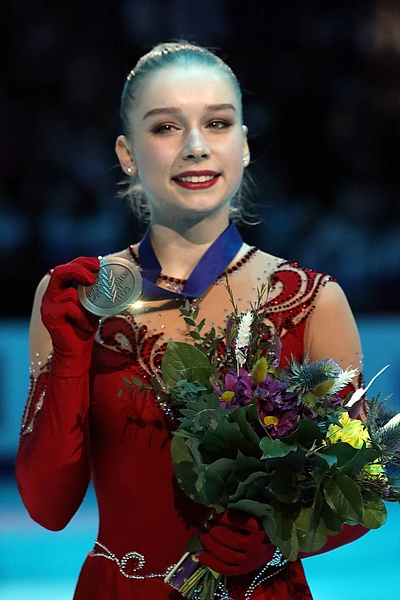
Lindfors on the podium at the 2019 European Championships

International
Event	13–14	14–15	15–16	16–17	17–18	18–19	19–20
Worlds			20th		16th	WD	
Europeans			8th	23rd	14th	3rd	
GP Cup of China							WD
GP Finland						8th	
GP NHK Trophy							WD
CS Finlandia			5th	10th	WD	3rd	WD
CS Lombardia				11th		5th	
CS Nebelhorn					6th		
CS Tallinn Trophy			4th	10th	10th	3rd	
CS Warsaw Cup		10th					
Dragon Trophy					2nd		
Hellmut Seibt		4th					
Int. Challenge Cup					7th		WD
Nordics		3rd	2nd	6th	1st		
Skate Helena		1st					
Tallink Hotels Cup						WD	
International: Junior
Junior Worlds			25th	14th	WD		
JGP Croatia		18th					
JGP Latvia			11th		10th		
JGP Poland			9th				
Dragon Trophy	1st						
Nordics	4th						
Skate Helena	1st						
National
Finnish Champ.	3rd J	3rd	4th	3rd	2nd	1st	

== Detailed results ==
Small medals for short and free programs awarded only at ISU Championships. ISU Personal bests in bold.

2018–19 season
Date	Event	SP	FS	Total
March 18–24, 2019	2019 World Championships	WD	WD	-
January 21–27, 2019	2019 European Championships	4; **65.61**	3; 128.79	3; **194.40**
December 16–17, 2018	2019 Finnish Championships	1; 62.89	1; 112.02	1; 174.91
November 26-December 2, 2018	2018 CS Tallinn Trophy	3; 63.56	3; 121.86	3; 185.42
November 2–4, 2018	2018 Grand Prix of Helsinki	10; 52.95	6; 106.67	8; 159.62
October 4–7, 2018	2018 CS Finlandia Trophy	6; 57.69	2; **129.50**	3; 187.19
September 12–16, 2018	2018 CS Lombardia Trophy	3; 62.68	6; 104.25	5; 166.93
2017–18 season
Date	Event	SP	FS	Total
March 19–25, 2018	2018 World Championships	13; 60.18	16; 106.05	16; 166.23
February 22–25, 2018	2018 International Challenge Cup	9; 50.06	6; 99.19	7; 149.25
February 8–11, 2018	2018 Dragon Trophy	1; 60.79	2; 99.68	2; 160.47
February 1–4, 2018	2018 Nordic Championships	2; 58.42	1; 108.21	1; 166.63
January 15–21, 2018	2018 European Championships	14; 51.62	17; 96.27	14; 147.89
December 15–17, 2017	2018 Finnish Championships	2; 59.89	2; 100.00	2; 159.89
November 21–26, 2017	2017 CS Tallinn Trophy	4; 59.03	15; 90.75	10; 149.78
October 6–8, 2017	2017 CS Finlandia Trophy	18; 43.12	WD	WD
September 27–30, 2017	2017 CS Nebelhorn Trophy	5; 53.75	6; 100.35	6; 154.10
September 6–9, 2017	2017 JGP Latvia	10; 46.47	9; 90.47	10; 136.94
2016–17 season
Date	Event	SP	FS	Total
March 15–19, 2017	2017 World Junior Championships	10; 55.50	15; 88.03	14; 143.53
March 2–5, 2017	2017 Nordic Championships	9; 44.04	5; 89.71	6; 133.75
January 25–29, 2017	2017 European Championships	19; 49.48	22; 80.62	23; 130.10
December 15–18, 2016	2017 Finnish Championships	2; 52.43	3; 86.08	3; 138.51
October 6–9, 2016	2016 CS Finlandia Trophy	11; 47.07	9; 90.03	10; 137.10
September 8–11, 2016	2016 CS Lombardia Trophy	9; 52.71	12; 88.24	11; 140.95
2015–16 season
Date	Event	SP	FS	Total
March 26 – April 3, 2016	2016 World Championships	23; 50.18	16; 102.75	20; 152.93
February 24–28, 2016	2016 Nordic Championships	2; 58.17	2; 107.05	2; 165.22
January 25–31, 2016	2016 European Championships	11; 53.92	8; 101.57	8; 155.49
December 18–20, 2015	2016 Finnish Championships	1; 58.27	4; 93.39	4; 151.66
November 18–22, 2015	2015 CS Tallinn Trophy	8; 47.09	3; 109.97	4; 157.06
October 9–11, 2015	2015 CS Finlandia Trophy	7; 51.14	5; 99.98	5; 151.12
