= Anita Östlund =

Swedish figure skater

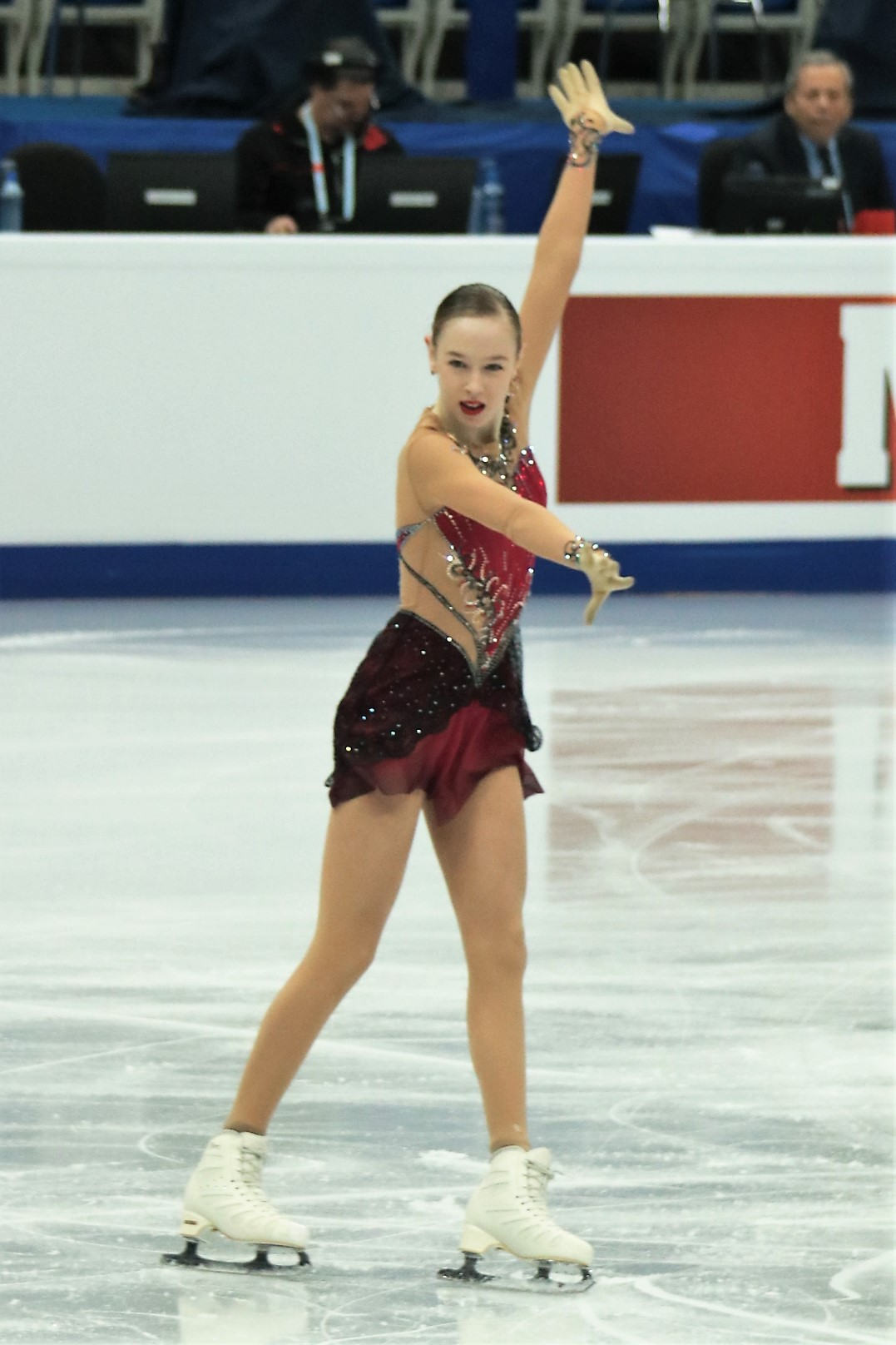
- Östlund at the 2018 European Championships

Personal information
- Born: 30 January 2001 (age 25) Odesa, Ukraine
- Home town: Gråbo, Sweden
- Height: 1.66 m (5 ft 5 in)

Figure skating career
- Country: Sweden
- Coach: Andrea Dohany, Aksana Jolkin
- Skating club: Landvetter SC
- Began skating: 2006

Medal record
Swedish Championships
Gold medal – first place	2018 Skellefteå	Singles
Gold medal – first place	2020 Ulricehamn	Singles
Silver medal – second place	2026 Landskrona	Singles
Bronze medal – third place	2018 Malmö	Singles

Anita Östlund (born 30 January 2001) is a Swedish figure skater. She is the 2017 Nordic bronze medalist, 2017 Sofia Trophy silver medalist, and a two-time Swedish national champion (2018, 2020). She represented Sweden at the 2018 Winter Olympics and has competed in the final segment at three ISU Championships.

== Personal life ==
Anita Östlund was born on 30 January 2001 in Odesa, Ukraine. She is the daughter of Yulia, an ethnic Russian, and Peter Östlund. She has three younger sisters – Nicole, Melina, and Michelle.

In 2023, Anita shared the violence she and her siblings endured from her mother.

She is currently studying psychology in Stockholm.

== Career ==
=== Early years ===
Östlund started learning to skate in 2006. For two seasons beginning in 2012–2013, she competed internationally on the advanced novice level. She won gold at the 2013 Ice Challenge, silver at the 2014 Nordics, and silver at the 2014 Bavarian Open.

=== 2014–2015 season: Junior debut ===
Östlund made her ISU Junior Grand Prix (JGP) debut in the 2014–2015 season, placing 17th in Courchevel and 14th in Ostrava. She won the junior ladies' silver medal at the Swedish Championships and was sent to the 2015 World Junior Championships, but did not advance to the free skate after placing 32nd in the short program.

=== 2015–2016 season ===
Östlund placed 9th at her 2015 JGP assignment in Linz, Austria, and 5th in junior ladies at the 2015 Tallinn Trophy. She won the junior silver medal at the Swedish Championships.

=== 2016–2017 season: Senior debut ===
Östlund began her season on the JGP series, placing 12th in Yokohama, Japan, and 7th in Tallinn, Estonia. Making her senior international debut, she placed 7th at the Warsaw Cup, a Challenger Series event in November 2016. In December, she finished third to Joshi Helgesson and Matilda Algotsson at the Swedish Championships.

Östlund's first senior international medal, silver, came in February 2017 at the Sofia Trophy in Sofia, Bulgaria, where she finished second to Isadora Williams. At the Nordics Open, held in March in Reykjavík, Iceland, she outscored both of her national co-medalists for the bronze medal and joined former world champions Carolina Kostner and Elizaveta Tuktamysheva on the podium. Later in the same month, she competed at the 2017 World Junior Championships in Taipei, Taiwan. She qualified to the free skate by placing 15th in the short and went on to finish 13th overall.

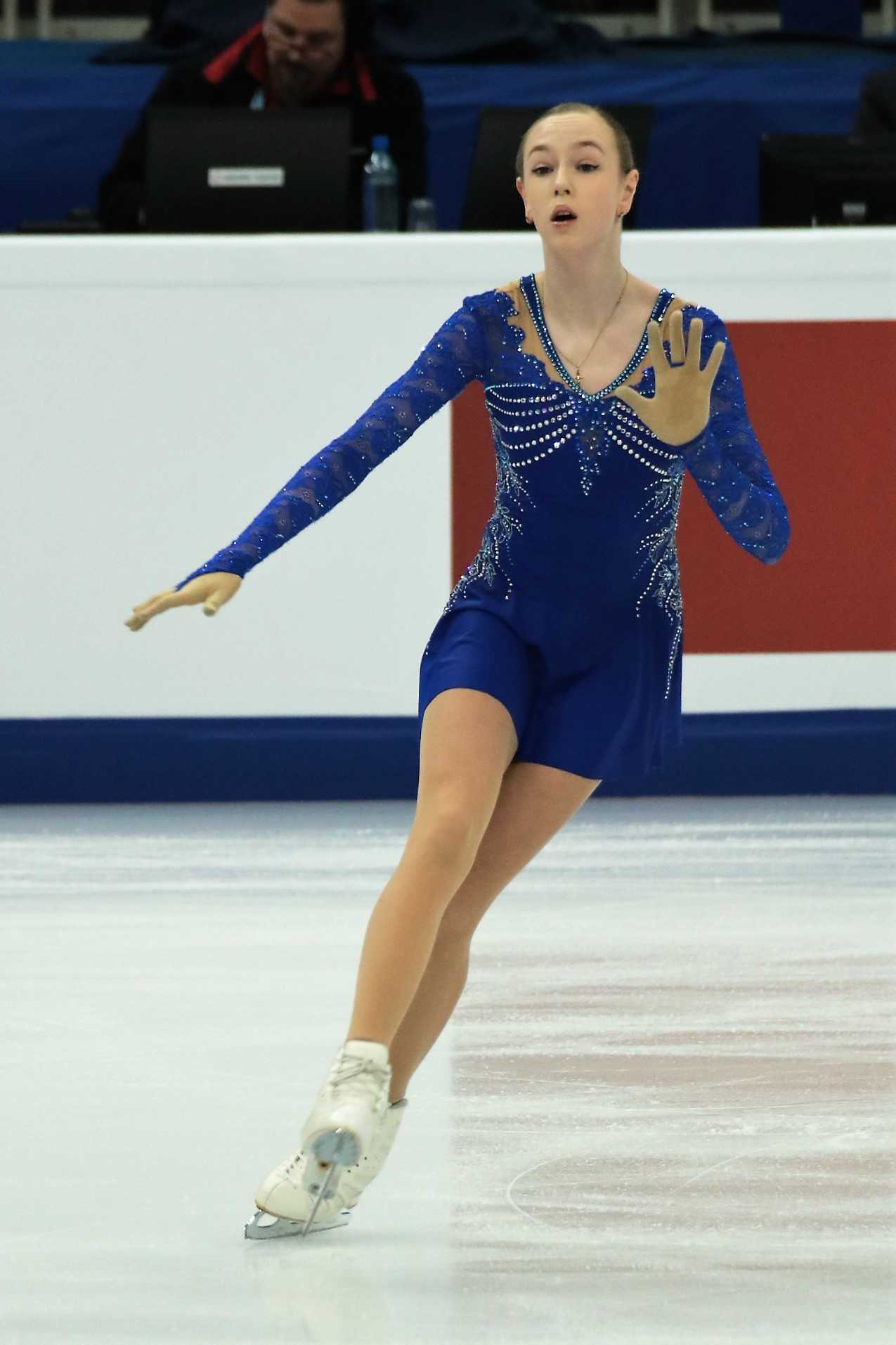
Östlund at the 2018 European Figure Skating Championships

=== 2017–2018 season: Pyeongchang Olympics ===
In September, Sweden qualified a spot at the 2018 Winter Olympics due to Matilda Algotsson's result at the 2017 CS Nebelhorn Trophy.

In December, Östlund won the Swedish senior national title by a 19-point margin over Algotsson. In January, she finished as Sweden's top ladies' entry at the 2018 European Championships, having placed 6th in the short program, 20th in the free skate, and 17th overall. On 23 January 2018, the Swedish Olympic Committee selected Östlund to compete at the Olympics under the committee's "future" criterion. The following month, she competed at the 2018 Winter Olympics in PyeongChang, South Korea. Ranked 28th in the short program, she did not advance to the final segment.

=== 2018–2019 season ===
Östlund opened her season at the CS Finlandia Trophy, placing 12th overall. She later placed 16th at the CS Alpen Trophy.

At the 2019 European Championships, she placed 18th overall. Subsequently, finishing 30th in the short program at the 2019 World Championships, failing to advance onto the free skating segment.

=== 2020–2021 season ===
Östlund opened her season with two Challenger Series events; Nebelhorn Trophy and Warsaw Cup. She placed 8th and 19th respectively. In December, Anita won the Swedish national title.

At the 2020 European Championships, Östlund placed 9th in the short program, scoring a new personal best short program score of 60.57 points. She placed 21st in the free skate, dropping to 18th place overall.

=== 2021–2022 season ===
Östlund began the season by placing 9th at the 2021 Tallink Hotels Cup. She later won bronze at the Sofia Trophy.

Closing her season, she placed 10th at the Budapest Trophy and 7th at the Swedish Championships.

=== 2023–2025: Hiatus, Mother's abuse ===
In 2023 Östlund disappeared from the competitive stage and opened up about violence she and her sisters had endured from her mother. “My three sisters and I were both physically and psychologically abused by our mother throughout our upbringing...Because it was hard for me at home, the skating rink became a refuge for me and a place where I could disconnect from everything that was hard. It meant a lot.” Anita additionally shared that she had apply for social services and live in a special shelter. “I took a break from competitive figure skating to focus on my wellness and my education. I didn’t say I was leaving, but let’s see how I feel. Now I focus on my well-being and work on myself" shares Anita.

=== 2025–2026 season: Return to competition ===
Östlund made her return to competitive ice after four years at the Volvo Open; placing 6th. She later won silver at the Swedish Championships and placed 4th at the Nordic Championships. She subsequently closed her season with a 4th place finish at the 2026 Tallink Hotels Cup.

=== 2026–2027 season ===
Östlund opened the new season with a 7th place finish at the 2026 CS Lombardia Trophy scoring new personal best scores in the free skate and overall.

== Programs ==
Season	Short program	Free skating
2026–2027	La La Land: Audition (The Fools Who Dream); Someone in the Crowd by Emma Stone; Epilogue by Justin Hurtwitz	
2025–2026	Ordinary by Alex Warren	Me Voy; Tu no sabes by Yasmin Levy
2020–2021	Sixteen Tons by Merle Travis performed by LeAnn Rimes; Soda Pop by Robbie Williams featuring Michael Bublé	The Show Must Go On by Queen performed by Celine Dion
2018–2019	Je t'aime by Rick Allison performed by Lara Fabian	Summer of '42 by Michel Legrand
2017–2018	Carmen Fantasie by David Garrett	Papa, Can You Hear Me? by Barbra Streisand
2016–2017	Carmen Fantasie by David Garrett; Je t'aime by Lara Fabian	And the Waltz Goes On by Anthony Hopkins; Carmen Fantasie by David Garrett
2015–2016	A Comme Amour by Richard Clayderman	Bacchanale (from Samson and Delilah) by Camille Saint-Saëns
2014–2015	Dark Eyes performed by André Rieu	Bacchanale (from Samson and Delilah) by Camille Saint-Saëns

== Competitive highlights ==
CS: Challenger Series; JGP: Junior Grand Prix

International
Event	14–15	15–16	16–17	17–18	18–19	19–20	20–21	21–22	25–26	26–27
Olympics				28th						
Worlds				29th	30th					
Europeans				17th	18th	18th				
CS Alpen Trophy					16th					
CS Budapest Trophy								10th		7th
CS Finlandia Trophy					12th					
CS Ice Star				8th						
CS Lombardia Trophy										8th
CS Nebelhorn Trophy						8th				
CS Warsaw Cup			7th	5th		19th				
CS Tallinn Trophy										7th
Bavarian Open						WD				
Halloween Cup					2nd					
Jégvirág Cup					5th					
Nordics			3rd							
Santa Claus Cup						6th				
Sofia Trophy			2nd					3rd		
Tallink Hotels Cup							9th		4th	
Toruń Cup			11th							
Volvo Open Cup									6th	
International: Junior
Junior Worlds	32nd		13th							
JGP Austria		9th		7th						
JGP Czech Rep.	14th									
JGP Estonia			7th							
JGP France	17th									
JGP Italy				9th						
JGP Japan			12th							
Avas Cup		1st								
Coupe Printemps		2nd								
FBMA Trophy		1st								
Ice Star		1st								
Nordics	6th	4th								
Tallinn Trophy		5th								
National
Swedish Champ.	2nd J	2nd J	3rd	1st	WD	1st		7th	2nd	
