= Alexander Samarin =

Russian figure skater (born 1998)

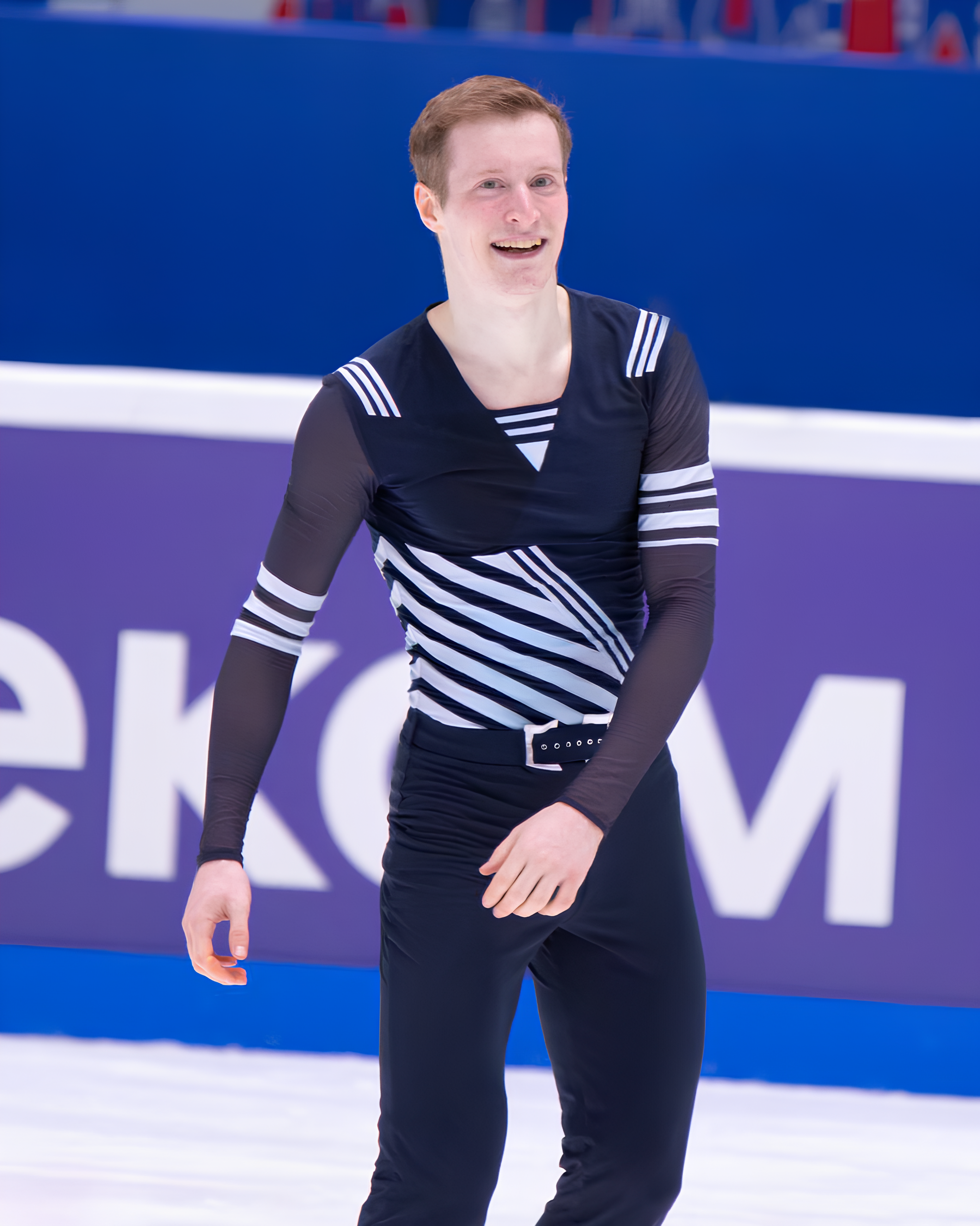
- Alexander Samarin at the 2024 Channel One Cup

Personal information
- Native name: Александр Владимирович Самарин
- Full name: Alexander Vladimirovich Samarin
- Born: 15 June 1998 (age 28) Moscow, Russia
- Height: 1.80 m (5 ft 11 in)

Figure skating career
- Country: Russia
- Discipline: Men's singles
- Began skating: 2002
- Retired: 2024
- Highest WS: 9th (2018–19)

Medal record
European Championships
Silver medal – second place	2019 Minsk	Singles
Russian Championships
Silver medal – second place	2017 Chelyabinsk	Singles
Silver medal – second place	2018 Saint Petersburg	Singles
Bronze medal – third place	2019 Saransk	Singles
Bronze medal – third place	2020 Krasnoyarsk	Singles
Bronze medal – third place	2023 Krasnoyarsk	Singles
World Team Trophy
Bronze medal – third place	2019 Fukuoka	Team
World Junior Championships
Bronze medal – third place	2017 Taipei	Singles
Junior Grand Prix Final
Silver medal – second place	2016–17 Marseille	Singles

Alexander Vladimirovich Samarin (Russian: Александр Владимирович Самарин; born 15 June 1998) is a retired Russian figure skater. He is the 2019 European silver medalist, the 2019 Internationaux de France silver medalist, the 2017 Skate Canada International bronze medalist, the 2018 Internationaux de France bronze medalist, and a four-time 2017 Russian national medalist (silver in 2017 and 2018, bronze in 2019, bronze in 2020). He has won three medals on the ISU Challenger Series, including gold at the 2015 CS Warsaw Cup.

As a junior, Samarin won bronze at the 2017 World Junior Championships and silver at the 2016–17 Junior Grand Prix Final, in addition to three gold medals on the ISU Junior Grand Prix series.

== Personal life ==
Alexander Vladimirovich Samarin was born on 15 June 1998 in Moscow.

== Career ==
=== Early years ===
Samarin began skating in 2002. His very first coach was Lyubov Fedorchenko at the Young Pioneers Stadium. In 2006, he switched to CSKA Moscow, where he was coached by Inna Goncharenko. In the 2009–10 season, he won the novice event at the 2010 NRW Trophy in Dortmund, Germany, and the junior silver medal at the International Crystal Skate 2010 in Odintsovo, Russia. In 2011–12, he withdrew from the 2012 Russian Junior Championships due to illness.

=== 2012–13 season ===
In 2012–13, Samarin underwent eye surgery because of a detached retina at the start of the season. Debuting on the ISU Junior Grand Prix (JGP) series, he won a pair of bronze medals at JGP events in Slovenia and Germany and became the first alternate for the 2012–13 Junior Grand Prix Final. At the Russian Championships, he finished eighth in his first senior appearance and then won the silver medal on the junior level. He was assigned to the 2013 World Junior Championships, where he finished eighth.

=== 2013–14 season ===
In 2013–14, Samarin was assigned to one JGP event in Belarus and finished fourth. At the 2014 Russian Championships, he placed thirteenth in seniors, landing his first triple Axel in competition in the free skate and then fourth at the junior level. Goncharenko coached him until the end of the season.

=== 2014–15 season ===
Samarin changed coaches ahead of the 2014–15 season, joining Elena Buianova and Svetlana Sokolovskaya. He won bronze at his first Junior Grand Prix event of the season, in Courchevel, France, and then silver in Ostrava, Czech Republic. Making his senior international debut, he took silver in November at the 2014 Ice Challenge, an ISU Challenger Series (CS) competition in Graz, Austria, and finished eighth the following month at another CS event, the 2014 Golden Spin of Zagreb. Nationally, he finished eleventh on the senior level and second on the junior level. Concluding his season, he placed sixth in the short, ninth in the free, and eleventh overall at the 2015 World Junior Championships in Tallinn, Estonia.

=== 2015–16 season ===
Competing in the 2015–16 JGP series, Samarin finished fourth in Slovakia and won gold in Croatia. He appeared at two CS events, placing fourth at the 2015 Mordovian Ornament and winning the 2015 Warsaw Cup. At Russian nationals, he ranked eighth on the senior level and won the silver medal as a junior, behind Dmitri Aliev. He finished fourth at the 2016 World Junior Championships in Debrecen after winning a small silver medal for the short program and placing fifth in the free skate.

=== 2016–17 season ===
Competing in the 2016–17 JGP series, Samarin won gold medals in Saransk, Russia, and Tallinn, Estonia. His medals qualified him to the 2016–17 Junior Grand Prix Final in Marseille. He competed at the senior level and won gold at the Volvo Open Cup in November. In December, he won silver in France, having finished second to Dmitri Aliev, and then took silver at the 2017 Russian Championships, behind Mikhail Kolyada.

In January 2017, Samarin competed at the 2017 European Championships, where he placed eighth. In March 2017, Samarin competed at the 2017 Junior Worlds, where he won the bronze medal after placing third in the short program and fourth in the free skate.

=== 2017–18 season ===
Handicapped by an injury to his right foot, Samarin was off the ice for about four months and returned to full training beginning of September. In October 2017, Samarin made his debut at the Grand Prix series. He won the bronze medal at the 2017 Skate Canada and placed fourth at the 2017 Internationaux de France.

In December 2017, Samarin competed at the 2018 Russian Championships, where he won the silver medal behind Mikhail Kolyada. In January 2018, he competed at the 2018 European Championships, where he placed sixth, lower than countrymen Kolyada and Aliev. He was consequently not named to the Russian Olympic team for the 2018 Winter Olympics, where there were only two men's spots.

=== 2018–19 season ===
Samarin underwent knee surgery in May, was back on the ice in July, and started jumping again towards the end of August. Samarin started his season at the 2018 CS Ondrej Nepela Trophy where he finished fifth. In his Grand Prix events, he placed fourth at 2018 Skate Canada and won the bronze medal at 2018 Internationaux de France.

In early December, Samarin competed at the 2018 CS Golden Spin of Zagreb where he won the bronze medal.

At the 2019 Russian Championships, Samarin placed fourth in the short program after falling on an attempted quad toe loop. In the free skate, he fell on the quad toe but recovered to land six clean triples. He placed second and won the bronze medal overall.

In January 2019, he won the silver medal at the 2019 European Championships after placing second in both the short program and the free skate. Samarin landed a quad Lutz, quad toe, and six triple jumps in the free skate. His only major mistake was a two-footed triple loop. He achieved a new personal best score of 269.84 points and his first podium finish at a senior-level ISU Championship.

Samarin competed at the 2019 Winter Universiade, where he placed fourth. In March 2019, Samarin competed at the 2019 World Championships and placed twentieth in the short program, seventh in the free program, and twelfth overall. Samarin landed his first quad flip jump in competition. He concluded the season as part of the Russian team at the 2019 World Team Trophy, where he placed last in the short program after falling on both quad attempts and performed better in the free skate. Team Russia won the bronze medal overall.

=== 2019–20 season ===
Samarin began the season with a fourth-place finish at the 2019 CS Ondrej Nepela Memorial before winning silver at the 2019 Shanghai Trophy.

On the Grand Prix, Samarin's first event was the 2019 Internationaux de France. In the short program, Samarin placed second behind Nathan Chen, having made only a slight error on his triple Axel in a segment where most other competitors either popped or fell at least once. As a result, he was sixteen points ahead of the third-place Kévin Aymoz going into the free skate. Samarin fell twice in the free skate, and finished third in that segment behind Chen and Aymoz, but won the silver medal overall. At the 2019 Rostelecom Cup, Samarin placed first in the short program despite falling on his quad flip and putting a foot down on his triple Axel. Narrowly first in the free skate as well, he became the first Russian man to win the Rostelecom Cup since Evgeni Plushenko in 2009, and qualified for the Grand Prix Final. He finished fourth at the Final.

Samarin placed eighth in the short program at the 2020 Russian Championships after making errors on all three jumping passes and failing to complete his jump combination. Third in the free skate despite two falls, he won the bronze medal.

Samarin was assigned to compete at the European Championships, where he performed poorly in the short program after underrotating his quad Lutz and falling on an attempted quad toe loop without executing a combination. He was thirteenth in that segment. The free skate was also a struggle, rising to tenth place overall.

=== 2020–21 season ===
Samarin debuted his programs at the senior Russian test skates. Competing on the domestic Cup of Russia series, he won the silver medal at the second stage in Moscow. He subsequently injured his back and, as a result, withdrew from his scheduled second Cup of Russia event as well as the 2020 Rostelecom Cup. After injuring his back, he contracted COVID-19 as well, though this was only a mild case.

Returning to competition at the 2021 Russian Championships, Samarin was fifth in the short program after falling on his quad Lutz and underrotating his triple Axel attempt. Sixth in the free skate, he remained in fifth place overall.

Samarin competed at the 2021 Channel One Trophy, a televised event organized in lieu of the cancelled European Championships. He was selected for the Time of Firsts team captained by Evgenia Medvedeva. He placed sixth in both segments, and the Time of Firsts team finished in second place. He did not participate in the Russian Cup Final.

=== 2021–22 season ===
Samarin began the season with a bronze medal at the Budapest Trophy. Competing on the Grand Prix at the 2021 Skate Canada International, he placed eighth. He was sixth at 2021 NHK Trophy, his second Grand Prix, notably managing second place in the free skate. On the latter result, he said, "I'm happy about that, but I can still do better."

At the 2022 Russian Championships, Samarin finished in sixth place.

== Programs ==
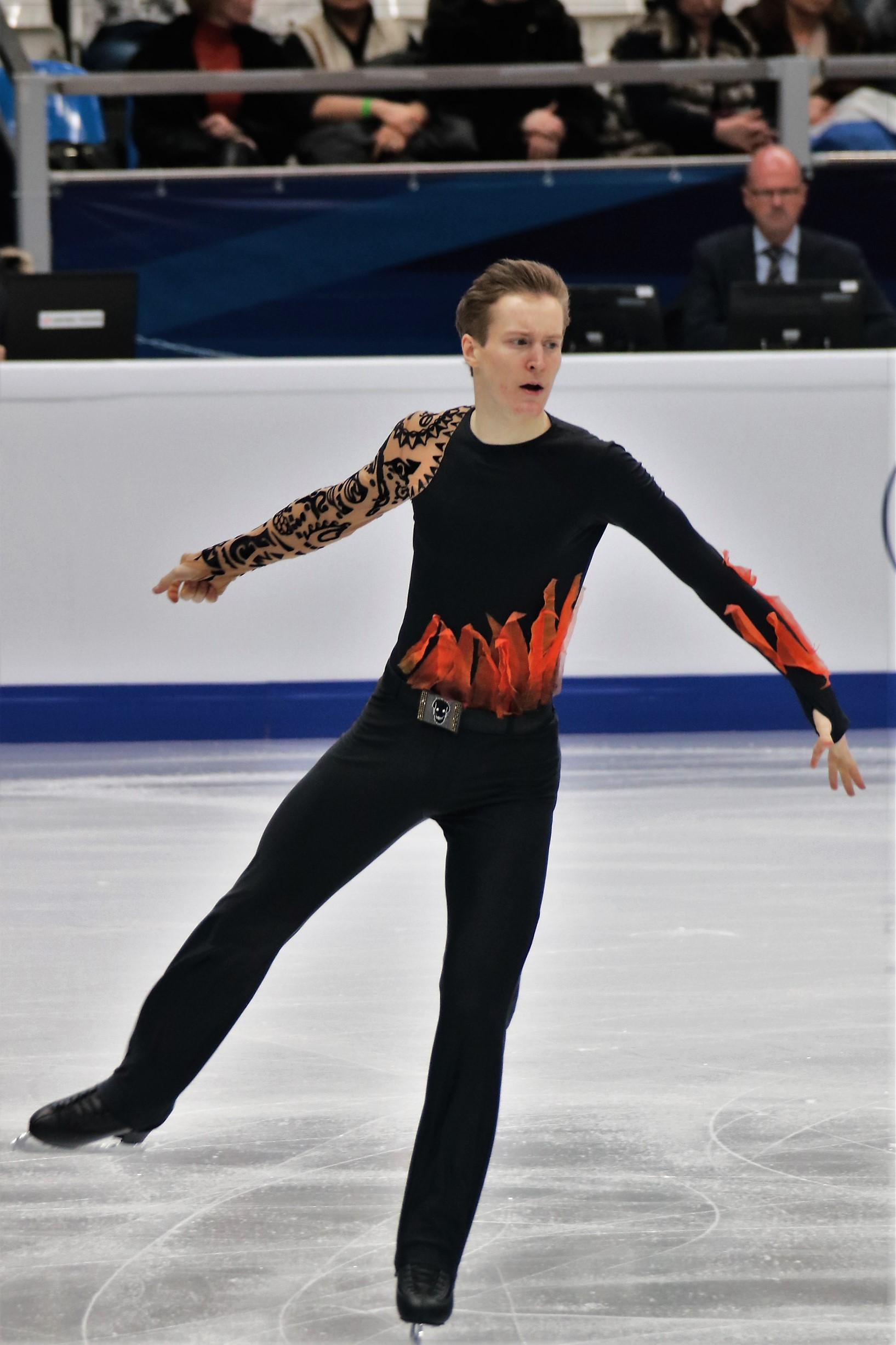
Samarin at the 2018 European Championships

Season	Short program	Free skating	Exhibition
2023-2024	Russian Sailor's Dance (from The Red Poppy) by Reinhold Glière	Axel F (from Beverly Hills Cop) by Harold Faltermeyer; Shout by Tears for Fears; Sweet Dreams (Are Made of This) by Eurythmics performed by Sebastian Bohm	
2022-2023	A Sky Full of Stars by Coldplay performed by Renato Janini and Taron Egerton	The Man from U.N.C.L.E by Daniel Pemberton and Tom Zé	
2021–2022	The Matrix by Don Davis choreo. by Ramil Mekhdiev	Lord & Master by Apashe; Save Us by Armand Amar choreo. by Ramil Mekhdiev	
2020–2021	Polyushko-pole by Lev Knipper choreo. by Nikita Mikhailov	Keeping Me Alive by Jonathan Roy choreo. by Nikita Mikhailov	
2019–2020	Blues for Klook by Eddy Louiss	Persecution by Secession Studios; Good News by Apashe	
2018–2019	Cold Blood by Dave Not Dave	From Now On; The Greatest Show (from The Greatest Showman) by Benj Pasek & Justin Paul	
2017–2018	Moonlight Sonata by Ludwig van Beethoven performed by E.S. Posthumus; I'm No Angel (Moonlight Sonata) by Eric Lévi, Ludwig van Beethoven performed by Era	La Naissance de Yaha by Saint-Preux; The Unforgiven III by Metallica; House of the Rising Sun performed by Dave Evans	Come with Me Now by Kongos
2016–2017	Come with Me Now by Kongos	Maybe I, Maybe You by Scorpions	
2015–2016	C'est toi by Dany Brillant	Pearl Harbor by Hans Zimmer	
2014–2015	Among Strangers by ?	Music by The Beatles	
2013–2014	A Mad Russian's Christmas by Trans-Siberian Orchestra (from The Nutcracker: Dance of the Sugar Plum Fairy by Pyotr Ilyich Tchaikovsky)	The Best Latin Tango	
2012–2013	Here, There and Everywhere; Come Together by The Beatles	Admiral by Ruslan Muratov, Gleb Matveichuk	
2011–2012	Here, There and Everywhere; Come Together by The Beatles	Admiral by Ruslan Muratov, Gleb Matveichuk	You Are So Beautiful by Joe Cocker
2010–2011	Dance of the Knights (from Romeo and Juliet) by Sergei Prokofiev	Reflection (from Mulan)	

== Competitive highlights ==
GP: Grand Prix; CS: Challenger Series; JGP: Junior Grand Prix

International
Event	10–11	11–12	12–13	13–14	14–15	15–16	16–17	17–18	18–19	19–20	20–21	21–22	22-23	23-24
Worlds									12th					
Europeans							8th	6th	2nd	10th				
GP Final										4th				
GP France								4th	3rd	2nd				
GP NHK Trophy												6th		
GP Rostelecom										1st	WD			
GP Skate Canada								3rd	4th			8th		
CS Golden Spin					8th				3rd					
CS Ice Challenge					2nd									
CS Mordovian						4th								
CS Ondrej Nepela								5th	5th	4th				
CS Warsaw Cup						1st								
Budapest Trophy												3rd		
Shanghai Trophy								1st		2nd				
Sofia Trophy												WD		
Tallink Hotels Cup										1st				
Volvo Open Cup							1st							
Universiade									4th					
International: Junior
Junior Worlds			8th		11th	4th	3rd							
JGP Final							2nd							
JGP Belarus				4th										
JGP Croatia						1st								
JGP Czech Rep.					2nd									
JGP Estonia							1st							
JGP France					3rd									
JGP Germany			3rd											
JGP Russia							1st							
JGP Slovakia						4th								
JGP Slovenia			3rd											
Rostel. Crystal	2nd													
International: Advanced novice
NRW Trophy	1st													
National
Russian Champ.			8th	13th	11th	8th	2nd	2nd	3rd	3rd	5th	6th	3rd	15th
Russian Junior	12th	WD	2nd	4th	2nd	2nd	WD							
Russian Cup Final (Note: The 2023 Russian Cup Final was renamed as the 2023 Russian Grand Prix Final.)						2nd	1st	6th					7th	11th
Team events
World Team Trophy									3rd T 10th P					

== Detailed results ==
=== Senior level ===
Small medals for short and free programs awarded only at ISU Championships. At team events, medals awarded for team results only.

2021–22 season
Date	Event	SP	FS	Total
December 21–26, 2021	2022 Russian Championships	6; 94.23	6; 170.50	6; 264.73
November 12–14, 2021	2021 NHK Trophy	7; 84.32	2; 171.33	6; 255.65
October 29–31, 2021	2021 Skate Canada International	8; 78.55	9; 145.65	8; 224.20
October 14–17, 2021	2021 Budapest Trophy	1; 74.46	3; 152.35	3; 226.81
2020–21 season
Date	Event	SP	FS	Total
February 5–7, 2021	2021 Channel One Trophy	6; 78.07	6; 166.04	2T/6P; 244.11
December 23–27, 2020	2021 Russian Championships	5; 87.96	6; 163.42	5; 251.38
November 20–22, 2020	2020 Rostelecom Cup	WD	WD	WD
2019–20 season
Date	Event	SP	FS	Total
February 13–16, 2020	2020 Tallink Hotels Cup	1; 82.89	1; 172.97	1; 255.86
January 20–26, 2020	2020 European Championships	13; 74.77	10; 145.66	10; 220.43
December 24–29, 2019	2020 Russian Championships	8; 80.68	3; 172.06	3; 252.74
December 5–8, 2019	2019–20 Grand Prix Final	5; 81.32	4; 167.51	4; 248.83
November 15–17, 2019	2019 Rostelecom Cup	1; 92.81	1; 171.64	1; 264.45
November 1–3, 2019	2019 Internationaux de France	2; 98.48	3; 166.62	2; 265.10
October 3–5, 2019	2019 Shanghai Trophy	2; 84.66	1; 161.70	2; 246.36
September 19–21, 2019	2019 CS Ondrej Nepela Memorial	3; 79.56	5; 138.89	4; 218.45
2018–19 season
Date	Event	SP	FS	Total
April 11–14, 2019	2019 World Team Trophy	12; 71.84	9; 158.53	3T/10P; 230.37
March 18–24, 2019	2019 World Championships	20; 78.38	7; 167.95	12; 246.33
March 7–9, 2019	2019 Winter Universiade	6; 82.41	4; 163.79	4; 246.20
January 21–27, 2019	2019 European Championships	2; 91.97	2; 177.87	2; 269.84
December 19–23, 2018	2019 Russian Championships	4; 83.24	2; 182.25	3; 265.49
December 5–8, 2018	2018 CS Golden Spin of Zagreb	3; 86.29	3; 151.55	3; 237.84
November 23–25, 2018	2018 Internationaux de France	2; 90.86	4; 156.23	3; 247.09
October 26–28, 2018	2018 Skate Canada International	4; 88.06	4; 160.72	4; 248.78
September 19–22, 2018	2018 CS Ondrej Nepela Trophy	5; 76.30	5; 139.39	5; 215.69
2017–18 season
Date	Event	SP	FS	Total
January 15–21, 2018	2018 European Championships	9; 74.25	6; 155.56	6; 229.81
December 21–24, 2017	2018 Russian Championships	1; 103.11	4; 155.42	2; 258.53
November 24–26, 2017	2017 Shanghai Trophy	–	1; 175.65	1; 175.65
November 17–19, 2017	2017 Internationaux de France	3; 91.51	4; 161.62	4; 253.13
October 27–29, 2017	2017 Skate Canada	4; 84.02	3; 166.04	3; 250.06
September 21–23, 2017	2017 CS Ondrej Nepela Trophy	3; 75.94	5; 137.73	5; 213.67

=== Junior level ===
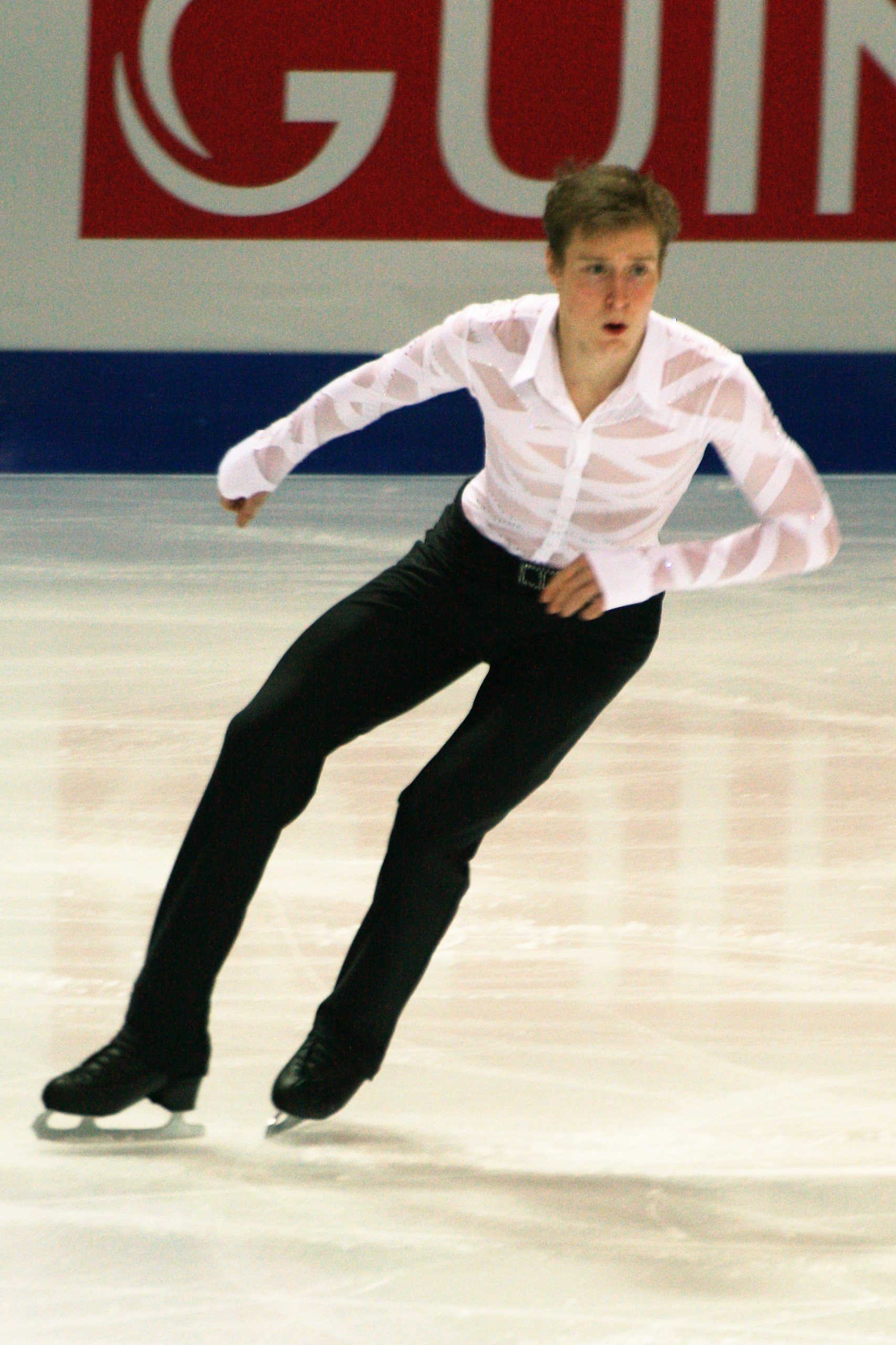
Samarin at the 2016–17 Junior Grand Prix Final

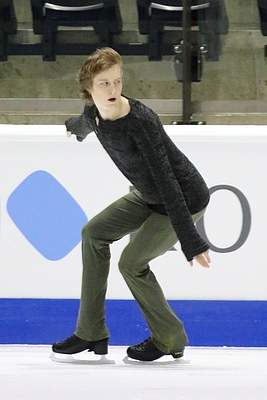
Samarin at the 2015 World Junior Championships

Small medals for short and free programs awarded only at ISU Championships.

2016–17 season
Date	Event	Level	SP	FS	Total
15–19 March 2017	2017 World Junior Championships	Junior	3; 82.23	4; 163.30	3; 245.53
13–17 February 2017	2017 Russian Cup Final domestic competition	Senior	1; 93.32	1; 174.22	1; 267.54
25–29 January 2017	2017 European Championships	Senior	9; 77.26	7; 153.61	8; 230.87
20–26 December 2016	2017 Russian Championships	Senior	2; 87.41	3; 172.33	2; 259.74
8–11 December 2016	2016–17 Junior Grand Prix Final	Junior	2; 81.08	2; 155.44	2; 236.52
9–13 November 2016	2016 Volvo Open Cup	Senior	1; 79.41	1; 152.02	1; 231.43
28 September – 2 October 2016	2016 JGP Estonia	Junior	2; 73.36	1; 160.93	1; 234.29
14–18 September 2016	2016 JGP Russia	Junior	1; 73.34	1; 154.99	1; 228.33
2015–16 season
Date	Event	Level	SP	FS	Total
14–20 March 2016	2016 World Junior Championships	Junior	2; 80.31	5; 141.80	4; 222.11
19–23 January 2016	2016 Russian Junior Championships	Junior	2; 82.97	2; 140.53	2; 223.50
24–27 December 2015	2016 Russian Championships	Senior	8; 79.73	8; 151.04	8; 230.77
27–29 November 2015	2015 CS Warsaw Cup	Senior	2; 76.44	1; 148.83	1; 225.27
15–18 October 2015	2015 CS Mordovian Ornament	Senior	2; 78.70	4; 143.75	4; 222.45
7–11 October 2015	2015 JGP Croatia	Junior	2; 72.96	1; 150.88	1; 223.84
19–23 August 2015	2015 JGP Slovakia	Junior	3; 67.87	6; 118.38	4; 186.25
2014–15 season
Date	Event	Level	SP	FS	Total
2–8 March 2015	2015 World Junior Championships	Junior	6; 70.61	9; 131.09	11; 201.70
4–7 February 2015	2015 Russian Junior Championships	Junior	2; 76.04	3; 133.33	2; 209.37
24–28 December 2014	2015 Russian Championships	Senior	9; 72.05	14; 115.82	11; 187.87
4–6 December 2014	2014 CS Golden Spin of Zagreb	Senior	8; 65.88	8; 128.09	8; 193.97
11–16 November 2014	2014 CS Ice Challenge	Senior	1; 69.16	2; 127.76	2; 196.92
3–7 September 2014	2014 JGP Czech Republic	Junior	2; 62.42	1; 126.27	2; 188.69
20–24 August 2014	2014 JGP France	Junior	2; 67.43	4; 111.73	3; 179.16
2013–14 season
Date	Event	Level	SP	FS	Total
22–25 January 2014	2014 Russian Junior Championships	Junior	7; 64.79	4; 139.54	4; 204.33
24–27 December 2013	2014 Russian Championships	Senior	16; 63.03	12; 130.08	13; 193.11
26–28 September 2013	2013 JGP Belarus	Junior	6; 59.40	4; 122.14	4; 181.54
2012–13 season
Date	Event	Level	SP	FS	Total
25 February – 3 March 2013	2013 World Junior Championships	Junior	5; 63.07	8; 123.89	8; 186.96
1–3 February 2013	2013 Russian Junior Championships	Junior	2; 71.88	3; 143.93	2; 215.81
24–28 December 2012	2013 Russian Championships	Senior	10; 65.34	7; 140.01	8; 205.35
11–13 October 2012	2012 JGP Germany	Junior	4; 59.09	3; 120.74	3; 179.83
27–29 September 2012	2012 JGP Slovenia	Junior	5; 60.81	3; 122.22	3; 183.03
2010–11 season
Date	Event	Level	SP	FS	Total
2–4 February 2011	2011 Russian Junior Championships	Junior	20; 48.57	8; 109.26	12; 157.83
