= Alexia Paganini =

Swiss figure skater (born 2001)

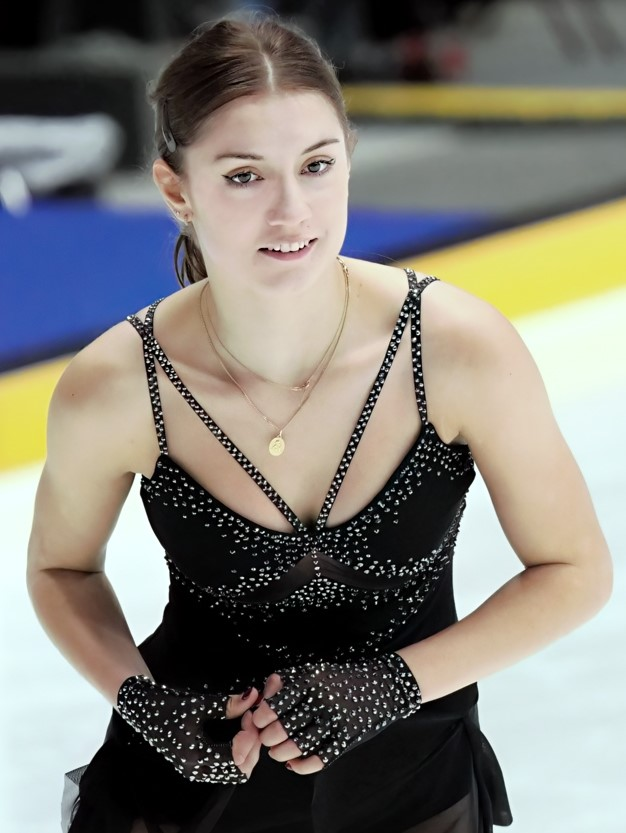
- Paganini during practice at the 2022 CS Finlandia Trophy

Personal information
- Born: November 15, 2001 (age 24) Greenwich, Connecticut, U.S.
- Home town: Zürich, Switzerland
- Height: 5 ft 7 in (1.69 m)

Figure skating career
- Country: Switzerland (2017–24); United States (until 2017)
- Coach: Michael Huth
- Began skating: 2003
- Retired: October 21, 2024

Medal record
Swiss Championships
Gold medal – first place	2018 Neuchâtel	Singles
Gold medal – first place	2019 Wetzikon	Singles
Gold medal – first place	2020 Biel/Bienne	Singles
Gold medal – first place	2022 Lucerne	Singles

Alexia Paganini (born November 15, 2001) is a former Swiss-American figure skater who represented Switzerland in ladies' singles. She is the 2020 CS Nebelhorn Trophy silver medalist, the 2018 Halloween Cup champion, the 2017 Slovenia Open champion, and a four-time Swiss national champion (2017–2019, 2021).

Paganini represented Switzerland at the 2018 and 2022 Winter Olympics, finishing twenty-first and twenty-second, respectively.

== Personal life ==
Alexia Paganini was born on November 15, 2001, in Greenwich, Connecticut, United States. The second of three children, she has two brothers – Kevin and Mario. She holds Swiss and U.S. citizenship. Her father, Celso Paganini, is from Brusio, Switzerland. Her mother, originally from the Netherlands, lived for ten years in St. Moritz, Switzerland.

== Career ==
=== Early career ===
Paganini began learning to skate in 2003. She skated at Westchester Skating Academy for a few years under her former coach, Gilberto Viadana. She represented the United States at two international events. In April 2016, she won the junior gold medal at the Gardena Spring Trophy in Italy. In August 2016, she finished sixth at an ISU Junior Grand Prix event in France.

In January 2017, Paganini placed fifth on the junior level at the U.S. Championships. Later that year, she became interested in competing for Switzerland after a suggestion by her coach, Igor Krokavec. Swiss Ice Skating became aware of her interest in April 2017 and soon contacted her.

=== 2017–2018 season: PyeongChang Olympics ===
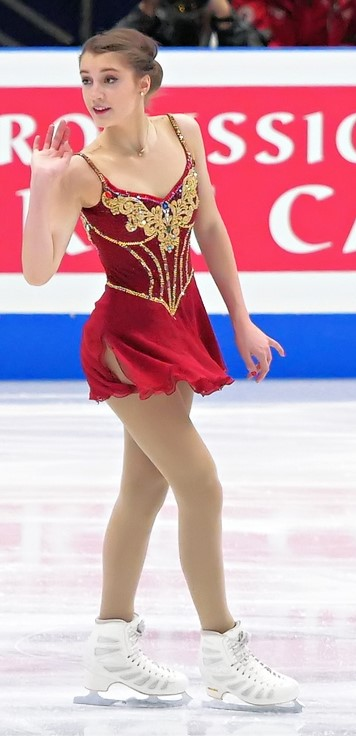
Paganini at the 2018 World Championships

Paganini made her senior international debut and her first appearance for Switzerland at the Slovenia Open in August 2017; she outscored Australia's Kailani Craine by 2.31 points to win the gold medal. In late September, she competed at the 2017 CS Nebelhorn Trophy, the final qualifying opportunity for the 2018 Winter Olympics. Ranked sixth in the short program and third in the free skate, she obtained the bronze medal (by a margin of 0.13 over Germany's Nathalie Weinzierl) in addition to a spot for Switzerland at the Olympics. In December, the Swiss Olympic Association confirmed that Paganini would represent Switzerland at the Olympics.

In January, Paganini finished seventh at the 2018 European Championships in Moscow, Russia. The following month, she competed at the 2018 Winter Olympics in PyeongChang, South Korea. Ranked nineteenth in the short program, she advanced to the final segment and would finish twenty-first overall. She also qualified to the free skate at the 2018 World Championships, finishing twentieth at the March event in Milan, Italy.

=== 2018–2019 season: Grand Prix debut ===
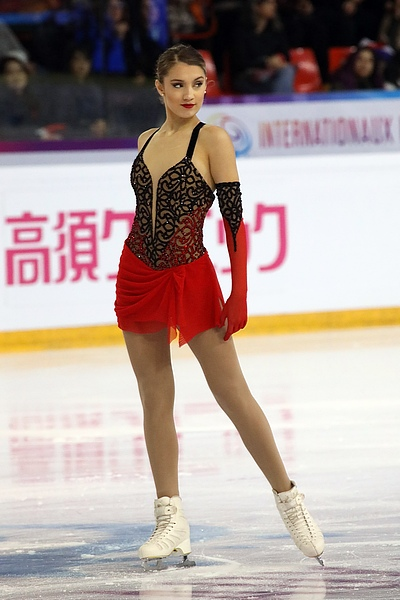
Alexia Paganini at the 2018 Internationaux de France

Alexia Paganini began her season with an eighth-place at the CS Autumn Classic. In October, she won the International Halloween Cup after placing second in the short program behind Ivett Tóth but first in the free.

Paganini made her Grand Prix debut at the 2018 Rostelecom Cup. In the short program, she scored a personal best (63.43) and was in third place. In the free skate, she marked her personal best (119.07), and she placed fifth, to finish fourth overall with a total of 182.50 (her personal best score), behind Alina Zagitova, Sofia Samodurova, and Lim Eun-soo. Due to Carolina Kostner's withdrawal from the 2018 Internationaux de France because of injury, Paganini was chosen to replace her at the event, giving her a second Grand Prix assignment. She was eighth after the short program, tenth in the free, and finished tenth overall. In December, she won the Swiss Championships for the second time in a row.

In January 2019, she competed at the European Championships, held in Minsk, Belarus. Paganini scored a new personal best in the short program, 65.64, and won the bronze small medal behind Zagitova and Samodurova. She said she was "really happy with my performance. I actually was nervous but tried not to show it." Paganini placed seventh in the free skate and finished sixth overall. She concluded the season at the 2019 World Championships, where she made multiple errors in the short program and placed thirty-third, failing to qualify for the free skate.

=== 2019–2020 season ===
Paganini began the season with a sixth place at the 2019 CS Autumn Classic International. At her first Grand Prix, the 2019 Skate Canada International, she placed ninth. She was seventh at the 2019 Rostelecom Cup. In December, she won her third straight Swiss national title and was named to the Swiss team for the European Championships. In January, she placed fourth at the championships. She was also named to the Swiss 2020 Worlds team, but the competition was canceled due to the coronavirus pandemic.

In June, she announced she was changing coaches to train with Stéphane Lambiel in Champéry. Paganini subsequently attributed the switch to the effects of the pandemic in the United States and her desire for "a change and for everything to be a bit more professional and organized."

=== 2020–2021 season ===
With pandemic-related travel restrictions in place, Paganini began the season at the 2020 CS Nebelhorn Trophy, an event attended only by ladies training in Europe. She was the top-ranked competitor attending and was pegged as the pre-event favorite. Paganini led after the short program but fell twice in the free and cut her right hand on the blade of her skate, placing third in that segment and second overall.

Paganini was assigned to compete at the 2020 Internationaux de France, but the event was cancelled due to the pandemic.

At the 2021 World Championships in Stockholm, Paganini placed twenty-fifth in the short program after popping a planned triple loop into an invalid double and narrowly missed advancing to the free skate.

On June 11, 2021, Paganini announced on social media that she'd discontinued training under Stéphane Lambiel in Champéry and relocated her training base to Zürich to train with Gheorghe Chiper and his coaching team.

=== 2021–2022 season: Beijing Olympics ===
Paganini began the season at the 2021 CS Lombardia Trophy, where she placed second in the short program but dropped to fourth place after the free skate. She next competed at the 2021 CS Nebelhorn Trophy, seeking to qualify a berth for Switzerland at the 2022 Winter Olympics after failing to do so at the World Championships. She was second in the short program and fifth in the free skate, placing fourth overall and taking the fourth of six available spots.

Paganini was originally scheduled to compete at 2021 Skate Canada International but later withdrew. She won her fourth Swiss national title in November. Beginning the new year at the 2022 European Championships in Tallinn, Paganini was tenth.

Assigned to her second Swiss Olympic team, Paganini placed nineteenth in the short program of the women's event, qualifying to the free skate. Both parts of her jump combination were called underrotated. She was twenty-second in the free skate and finished twenty-second overall. After on Instagram, Paganini said she was "incredibly grateful" to have been a two-time Olympian. Paganini concluded the season with a nineteenth place at the 2022 World Championships, expressing satisfaction with the result after having come down with the flu in the week beforehand.

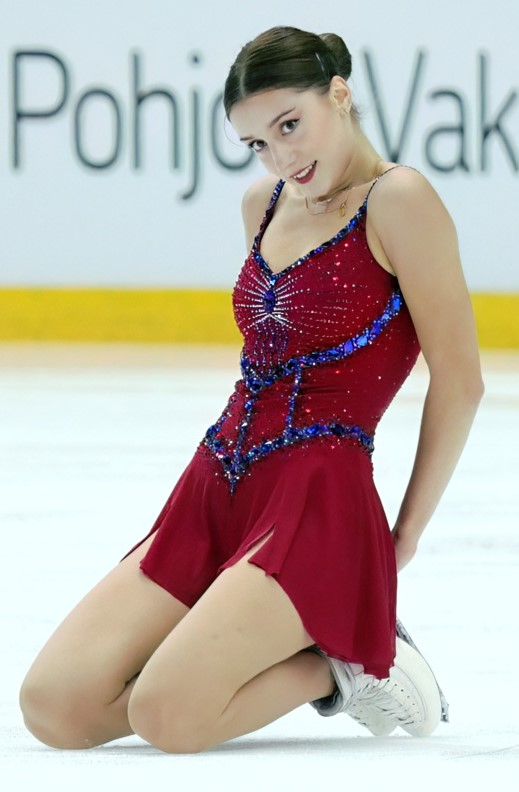
Paganini at the 2022 CS Finlandia Trophy

=== 2022–2023 season ===
Paganini began the season finishing fifth at the 2022 CS Finlandia Trophy. She placed fifth in the short program at the 2022 CS Budapest Trophy but withdrew before the free skate, citing medical reasons. In her lone Grand Prix appearance, she came ninth at the 2022 MK John Wilson Trophy.

=== 2023–2024 season ===
Beginning the season on the 2023-24 ISU Challenger Series, Paganini finished fifth at the 2023 CS Nebelhorn Trophy, fourteenth at the 2023 CS Finlandia Trophy, and thirteenth at the 2023 CS Warsaw Cup.

She then closed the season with a fourth-place finish at the 2024 Swiss Championships.

In October 2024, Paganini announced her retirement from competitive figure skating.

== Programs ==
Season	Short program	Free skating	Exhibition
2023–2024	Tango Jalousie by Jacob Gade; Des Tours de Vies by Appart	Nina's Dream (from Black Swan) by Clint Mansell; Valse; Finale (from Swan Lake) by Pyotr Ilyich Tchaikovsky	
2022–2023	The Way You Make Me Feel by Michael Jackson performed by Judith Hill; Dangerous (Immortal Version) by Michael Jackson choreo. by Adam Solya	Scheherazade by Nikolai Rimsky-Korsakov choreo. by Nikolai Morozov	
2021–2022	Summertime by George Gershwin performed by Louis Armstrong, Ella Fitzgerald; Ich Dich Liebe by Max Colpet, Lotar Olias, Karl Vibach performed by Pink Martini choreo. by Nikolai Morozov; La cumparsita performed by Milva	Scheherazade by Nikolai Rimsky-Korsakov choreo. by Nikolai Morozov	
2020–2021	Caught Out In the Rain by Beth Hart choreo. by Salomé Brunner	Hable con ella by Alberto Iglesias; Le di a la caza alcance performed by Estrella Morente & Michael Nyman choreo. by Stéphane Lambiel	Fallin'; Never Felt That Way by Alicia Keys
2019–2020	Sixteen Tons by Merle Travis performed by LeAnn Rimes; Bei Mir Bistu Shein choreo. by Misha Ge	Mia and Sebastian's Theme; City of Stars; Epilogue (from La La Land) by Justin Hurwitz; Jealousy by Jounetsu Tairiku choreo. by David Wilson	Grease medley
2018–2019	Yo soy Maria (from María de Buenos Aires) by Astor Piazzolla, Horacio Ferrer	Mia and Sebastian's Theme; City of Stars; Epilogue (from La La Land) by Justin Hurwitz	Caruso by Lucio Dalla performed by Lara Fabian
2017–2018	A Thousand Times Goodnight (from Romeo and Juliet) by Abel Korzeniowski; Found by Kerry Muzzey	Phantom Fantasia (from The Phantom of the Opera) by Anthony Inglis	Nocturne by Secret Garden
2016–2017	On Golden Pond by Dave Grusin	Pas de Deux (from The Nutcracker) by Pyotr Ilyich Tchaikovsky	I Was Here by Beyoncé; On Golden Pond by Dave Grusin
2015–2016	The Aquarium (from The Carnival of the Animals) by Camille Saint-Saëns	Libertango by Astor Piazzolla	
2014–2015	Waltz No. 15 (from Sixteen Waltzes) by Johannes Brahms		
2013–2014	The Incredits (from The Incredibles) by Michael Giacchino	Cloud Atlas by Tom Tykwer, Reinhold Heil, and Johnny Klimek	
2012–2013		Rondo à la clochette (from Violin Concerto No. 2) by Niccolò Paganini	

== Competitive highlights ==
GP: Grand Prix; CS: Challenger Series; JGP: Junior Grand Prix

=== For Switzerland ===
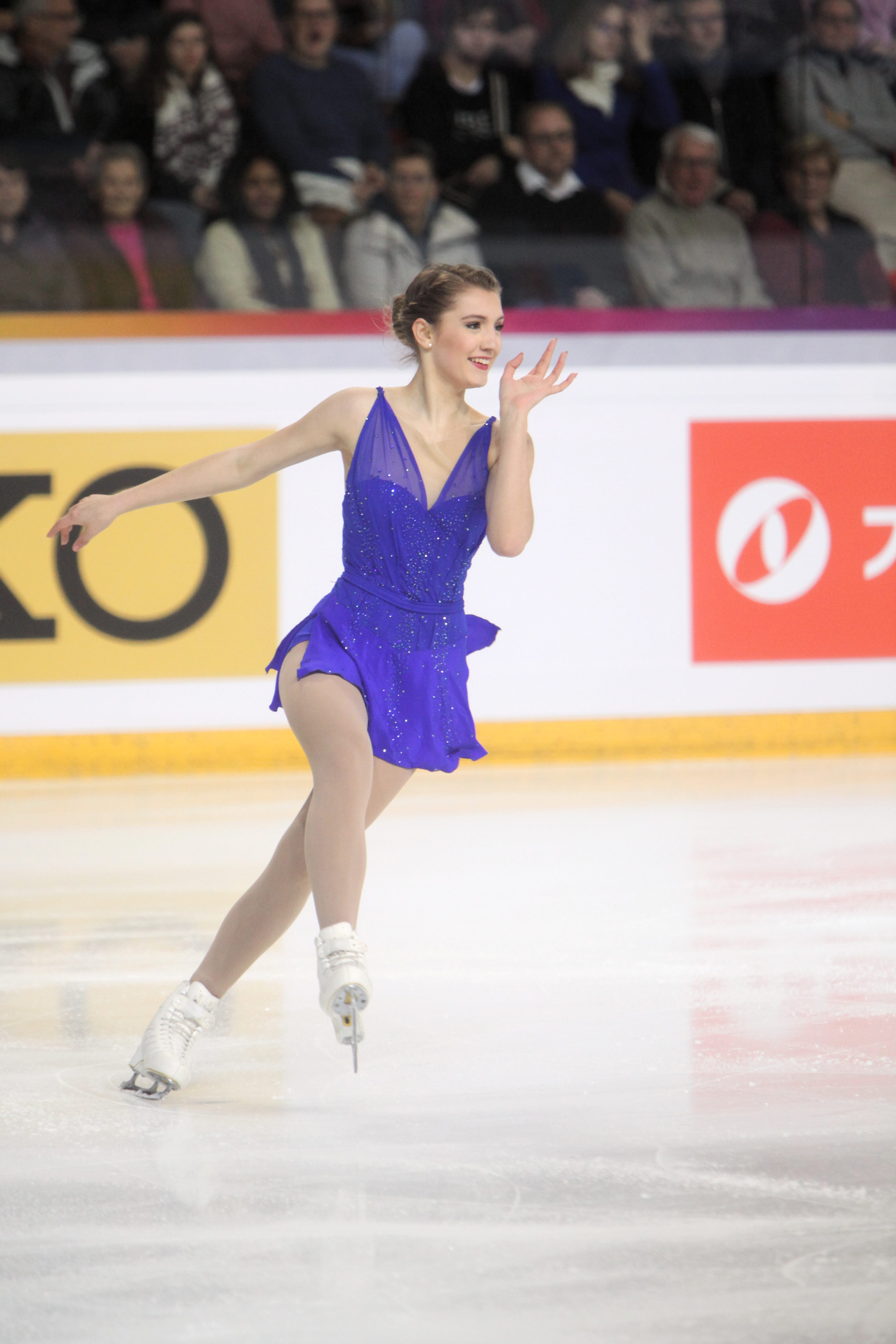
Paganini at the 2018 Internationaux de France

International
Event	17–18	18–19	19–20	20–21	21–22	22–23	23–24
Olympics	21st				21st		
Worlds	20th	33rd	C	25th	19th		
Europeans	7th	6th	4th	C	9th		
GP France		10th		C			
GP Rostelecom Cup		4th	7th				
GP Skate Canada			9th		WD		
GP Wilson Trophy						9th	
CS Autumn Classic		8th	6th				
CS Budapest						WD	
CS Cup of Tyrol				C			
CS Finlandia						5th	14th
CS Lombardia					4th		
CS Nebelhorn	3rd			2nd	4th	WD	5th
CS Warsaw Cup							13th
Challenge Cup				WD			
Halloween Cup		1st					
Santa Claus Cup						WD	
Slovenia Open	1st						
Swiss Open							WD
National
Swiss Champ.	1st	1st	1st		1st		4th

=== For the United States ===
International: Junior
Event	15–16	16–17
JGP France		6th
Gardena Trophy	1st	
National
U.S. Champ.		5th J

== Detailed results ==
ISU personal best scores in the +5/-5 GOE System
Segment	Type	Score	Event
Total	**TSS**	**192.88**	2020 Europeans
Short program	**TSS**	**68.82**	2020 Europeans
Short program	TES	28.12	2020 Europeans
Short program	PCS	24.45	2020 Europeans
Free skating	**TSS**	**124.06**	2020 Europeans
Free skating	TES	49.54	2020 Europeans
Free skating	PCS	49.75	2020 Europeans

=== Senior level ===
Small medals for short and free programs awarded only at ISU Championships. Personal bests highlighted in bold.

**2023–24 season**
Date	Event	SP	FS	Total
15–17 December 2023	2024 Swiss Championships	4; 53.13	4; 100.55	4; 153.68
November 16–19, 2023	2023 CS Warsaw Cup	14; 51.44	12; 96.00	13; 147.44
October 4–8, 2023	2023 CS Finlandia Trophy	6; 59.60	17; 83.84	14; 143.44
September 20–23, 2023	2023 CS Nebelhorn Trophy	5; 58.61	5; 110.35	5; 168.96
**2022–23 season**
Date	Event	SP	FS	Total
November 11–13, 2022	2022 MK John Wilson Trophy	11; 54.63	10; 102.26	9; 156.89
October 13–16, 2022	2022 CS Budapest Trophy	5; 54.29	WD	WD
October 4–9, 2022	2022 CS Finlandia Trophy	7; 57.09	6; 108.62	5; 165.71
**2021–22 season**
Date	Event	SP	FS	Total
March 21–27, 2022	2022 World Championships	13; 63.09	19; 106.93	19; 170.02
February 15–17, 2022	2022 Winter Olympics	18; 61.06	21; 107.85	21; 168.91
January 10–16, 2022	2022 European Championships	9; 62.32	10; 115.78	10; 178.10
November 27–28, 2021	2021 Swiss Championships	1; 64.82	1; 110.41	1; 175.23
September 22–25, 2021	2021 CS Nebelhorn Trophy	2; 65.65	5; 114.83	4; 180.48
September 10–12, 2021	2021 CS Lombardia Trophy	2; 62.14	5; 109.34	4; 171.48
**2020–21 season**
Date	Event	SP	FS	Total
March 22–28, 2021	2021 World Championships	25; 57.23	-	25; 57.23
September 23–26, 2020	2020 CS Nebelhorn Trophy	1; 63.60	3; 105.25	2; 168.85
**2019–20 season**
Date	Event	SP	FS	Total
January 24–25, 2020	2020 European Championships	4; **68.82**	4; **124.06**	4; **192.88**
December 7–8, 2019	2019 Swiss Championships	1; 61.19	1; 115.99	1; 177.18
November 15–17, 2019	2019 Rostelecom Cup	4; 65.12	9; 114.57	7; 179.69
October 25–27, 2019	2019 Skate Canada	9; 60.68	9; 105.52	9; 166.20
September 12–14, 2019	2019 CS Autumn Classic	4; 58.87	8; 99.46	6; 158.33
**2018–19 season**
Date	Event	SP	FS	Total
March 18–24, 2019	2019 World Championships	33; 50.51	-	-
January 21–27, 2019	2019 European Championships	3; 65.64	7; 114.26	6; 179.90
December 14–16, 2018	2018 Swiss Championships	2; 54.54	1; 119.62	1; 174.16
November 23–25, 2018	2018 Internationaux de France	8; 56.88	10; 99.63	10; 156.51
November 16–18, 2018	2018 Rostelecom Cup	3; 63.43	5; 119.07	4; 182.50
October 19–21, 2018	2018 International Halloween Cup	2; 53.23	1; 103.90	1; 157.13
September 20–22, 2018	2018 CS Autumn Classic	7; 56.07	8; 101.75	8; 157.82
**2017–18 season**
Date	Event	SP	FS	Total
March 19–25, 2018	2018 World Championships	19; 57.86	22; 91.80	20; 149.66
February 14–25, 2018	2018 Winter Olympics	19; 55.26	22; 101.00	21; 156.26
January 15–21, 2018	2018 European Championships	9; 54.95	9; 106.67	7; 161.62
December 15–16, 2017	2017 Swiss Championships	1; 59.54	1; 101.37	1; 160.91
September 27–30, 2017	2017 CS Nebelhorn Trophy	6; 53.59	3; 102.39	3; 155.98
September 1–3, 2017	2017 Slovenia Open	3; 53.60	1; 108.67	1; 162.27
