= Irakli Maysuradze =

Georgian figure skater (born 2000)

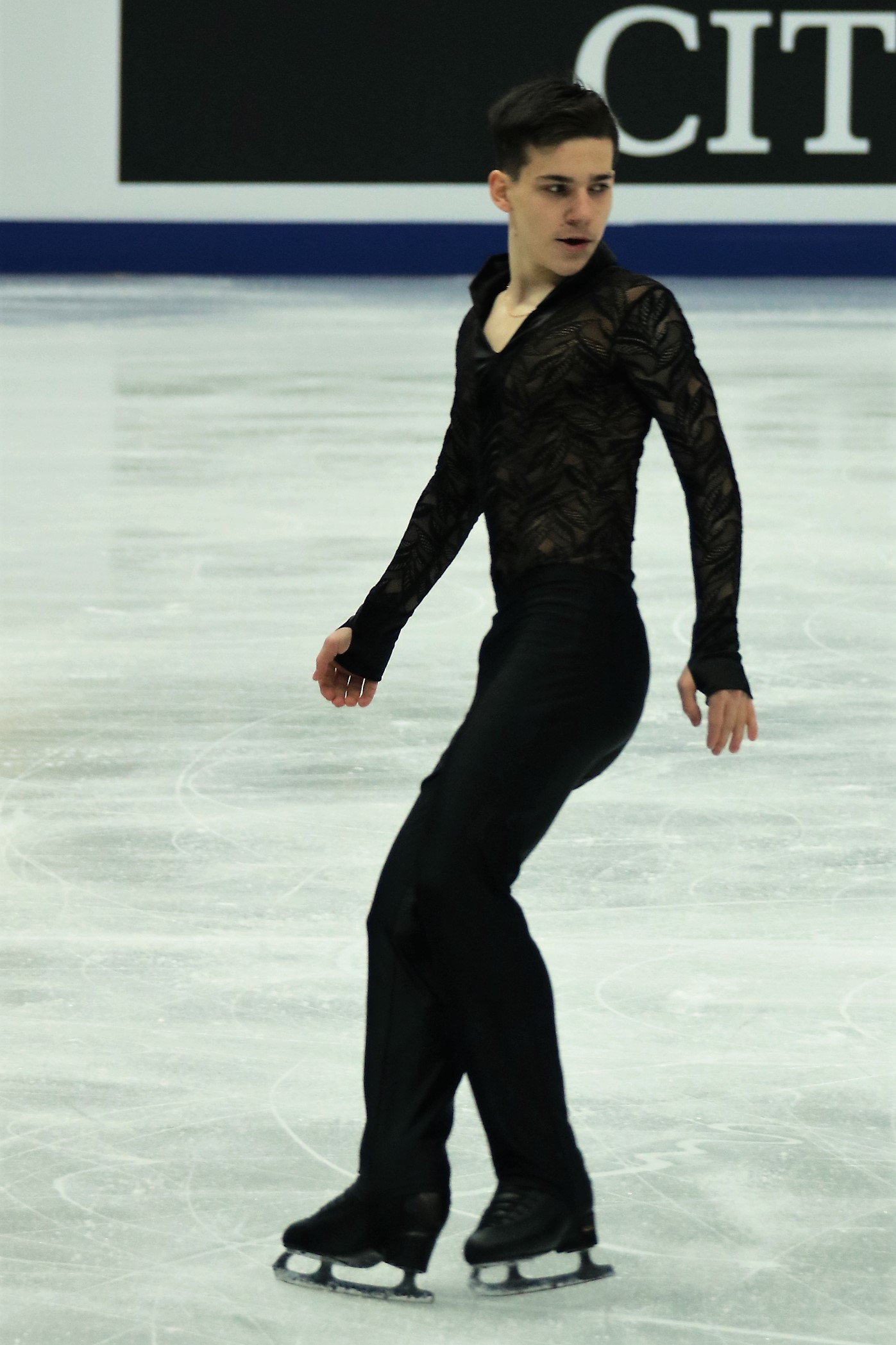
- Maysuradze in 2018

Personal information
- Native name: ირაკლი მაისურაძე
- Born: 24 May 2000 (age 26) Tbilisi, Georgia
- Height: 1.68 m (5 ft 6 in)

Figure skating career
- Country: Georgia
- Coach: Svetlana Sokolovskaia
- Skating club: CSKA Moscow
- Began skating: 2004

Irakli Maysuradze (Georgian: ირაკლი მაისურაძე; born 24 May 2000) is a Georgian figure skater. He has won four senior international medals and competed in the final segment at six ISU Championships.

== Personal life ==
Maysuradze was born on 24 May 2000 in Tbilisi, Georgia. He moved to Moscow, Russia, when he was four years old.

== Career ==
=== 2014–2015 season ===
Maysuradze debuted on the Junior Grand Prix (JGP) series in the 2014–2015 season. In January 2015, he finished fifth at the European Youth Olympic Festival in Dornbirn, Austria. In March, he qualified for the final segment at the 2015 World Junior Championships in Tallinn, Estonia by placing 24th in the short program. After placing 16th in the free skate, he rose to 18th overall. Vladimir Kotin and Sergei Davydov coached him in Moscow, Russia, until the end of the season.

=== 2015–2016 season ===
During the 2015–2016 season, Maysuradze was coached by Rafael Arutyunyan and Vera Arutyunyan in Artesia, California. He qualified for the free skate at the 2016 World Junior Championships in Debrecen, Hungary, placing 24th in both segments and overall.

=== 2016–2017 season ===
In 2016–2017, Maysuradze was coached by Sergei Davydov in Moscow. Returning to the JGP series, he placed 6th in Saransk, Russia, and 7th in Tallinn, Estonia. In November, he stepped onto his first senior international podium, winning silver at Ice Star in Belarus. The following month, he took silver at the Santa Claus Cup in Hungary.

=== 2017–2018 season ===
Maysuradze remained in Moscow but changed coaches, joining Svetlana Sokolovskaia. During the season, he qualified to the free skate at two ISU Championships. At the 2018 European Championships in Moscow, he finished 17th overall after placing 18th in the short and 15th in the free. At the 2018 World Junior Championships in Sofia (Bulgaria), he placed 9th in the short, 15th in the free, and 12th overall.

== Programs ==
Season	Short program	Free skating
2019–2020	Fix You by Coldplay	For My Help by Hayden Calnin; Cold Little Heart by Michael Kiwanuka
2018–2019	Uptown Funk by Bruno Mars	The Untouchables by Ennio Morricone
2017–2018	Peter Gunn Theme by Henry Mancini performed by The Blues Brothers; Kiss performed by Art of Noise feat. Tom Jones	The Sound of Silence performed by Disturbed
2016–2017	Black Betty by Ram Jam	Con te partirò by Francesco Sartori, performed by Grégory Lemarchal
2014–2016	Lezginka (Caucasian folk music)	Take Five by Dave Brubeck; Hit the Road Jack; Tank (for Cowboy Bebop) by Yoko Kanno

== Competitive highlights ==
CS: Challenger Series; JGP: Junior Grand Prix

International
Event	14–15	15–16	16–17	17–18	18–19	19–20	20–21	21–22
Europeans				17th	23rd	14th		
GP Rostelecom Cup							WD	
CS Golden Spin				12th	9th			WD
CS Warsaw Cup								10th
Bosphorus Cup						6th		
Golden Bear						1st		
Ice Star			2nd					
Santa Claus Cup			2nd					
Volvo Open						2nd		1st
International: Junior
Junior Worlds	18th	24th	35th	12th	7th			
JGP Estonia			7th					
JGP Japan	11th							
JGP Poland		13th						
JGP Russia			6th					
JGP Slovenia	13th							
JGP Spain		20th						
EYOF	5th							
Ice Star	3rd							
Crystal Skate (RU)	3rd							
National
Georgian Champ.			2nd					
J = Junior level
