= Conor Stakelum (figure skater) =

Irish figure skater (born 1993)

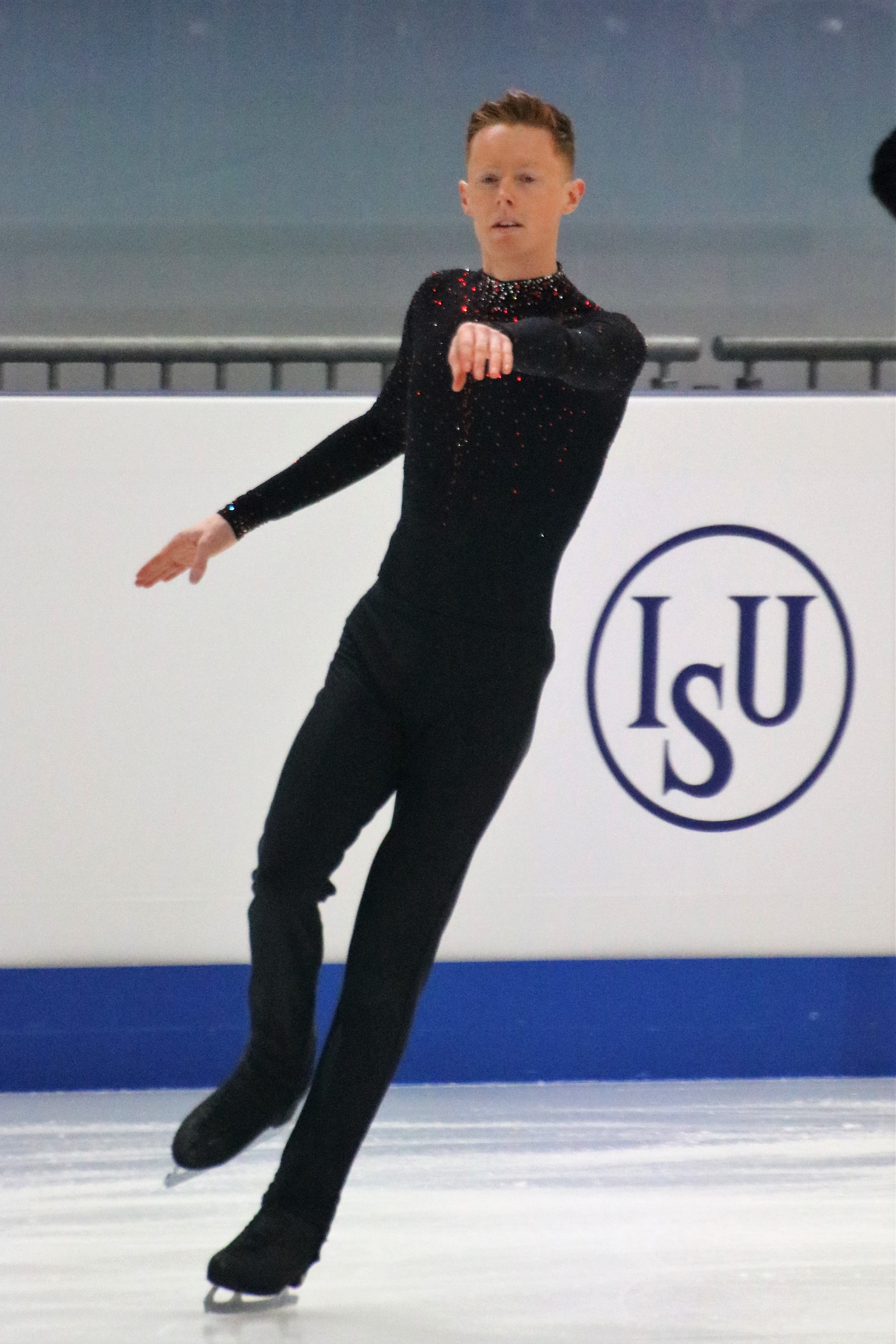
- Stakelum at the 2020 European Championships

Personal information
- Born: 2 August 1993 (age 32) Dublin, Ireland
- Home town: Dundee, Scotland
- Height: 1.80 m (5 ft 11 in)

Figure skating career
- Country: Ireland
- Coach: Simon Brigg, Debi Brigg
- Began skating: 2007

Conor Stakelum (born 2 August 1993) is a retired Irish figure skater. He is the 2017 FBMA Trophy silver medalist and a five-time Irish national champion (2014–2018).

== Competitive highlights ==
GP: Grand Prix; CS: Challenger Series; JGP: Junior Grand Prix

International
Event	12–13	13–14	14–15	15–16	16–17	17–18	18–19	19–20	20–21	21–22
Europeans						36th	33rd	34th		30th
CS Autumn Classic							11th			
CS Budapest									WD	
CS Cup of Tyrol									C	
CS Golden Spin				22nd						
CS Lombardia					10th					
CS Nebelhorn				15th		25th		15th		29th
CS Volvo Cup			19th							
CS Warsaw Cup										28th
Coupe de Nice		21st	15th	17th						
Denkova-Staviski Cup						10th	4th	10th		
FBMA Trophy						2nd				
Halloween Cup							6th			
Int. Challenge Cup		11th				12th				
Nebelhorn Trophy	34th									
NRW Trophy					14th					
Santa Claus Cup					12th					8th
Sportland Trophy				9th						
Tayside Trophy								4th		10th
Volvo Open Cup				8th						
International: Junior
JGP U.S.	17th									
Hellmut Seibt	5th									
Triglav Trophy	8th									
National
Irish Champ.	1st J	1st	1st	1st	1st	1st	2nd	WD	C	2nd
C = Cancelled; J = Junior level; P = Preliminary round
