= Simonen =

Simonen is a Finnish surname. Notable people with the surname include:

- Aarre Simonen (1913–1977), Finnish lawyer and politician
- Emilia Simonen (born 1996), Finnish pair skater
- Heikki Simonen (1902–1975), Finnish politician
- Mari Simonen (born 1951), Finnish United Nations officials
- Vieno Simonen (1898–1994), Finnish politician and farmer
