= 2017 World Figure Skating Championships =

Annual figure skating competition held in 2017

- Type: ISU Championship
- Date: 29 March – 2 April 2017
- Season: 2016–17
- Location: Helsinki, Finland
- Host: Finnish Figure Skating Association
- Venue: Hartwall Arena

Champions
- Men's singles: (Japan) Yuzuru Hanyu
- Ladies' singles: (Russia) Evgenia Medvedeva
- Pairs: (China) Sui Wenjing / Han Cong
- Ice dance: (Canada) Tessa Virtue / Scott Moir
- Previous: 2016 World Championships
- Next: 2018 World Championships

The 2017 World Figure Skating Championships were held 29 March – 2 April 2017 in Helsinki, Finland. The host was named in June 2014. Medals were awarded in the disciplines of men's singles, ladies' singles, pairs, and ice dancing. The event also determined the number of entries for each country at the 2018 World Championships and the 2018 Winter Olympics.

== Venues ==
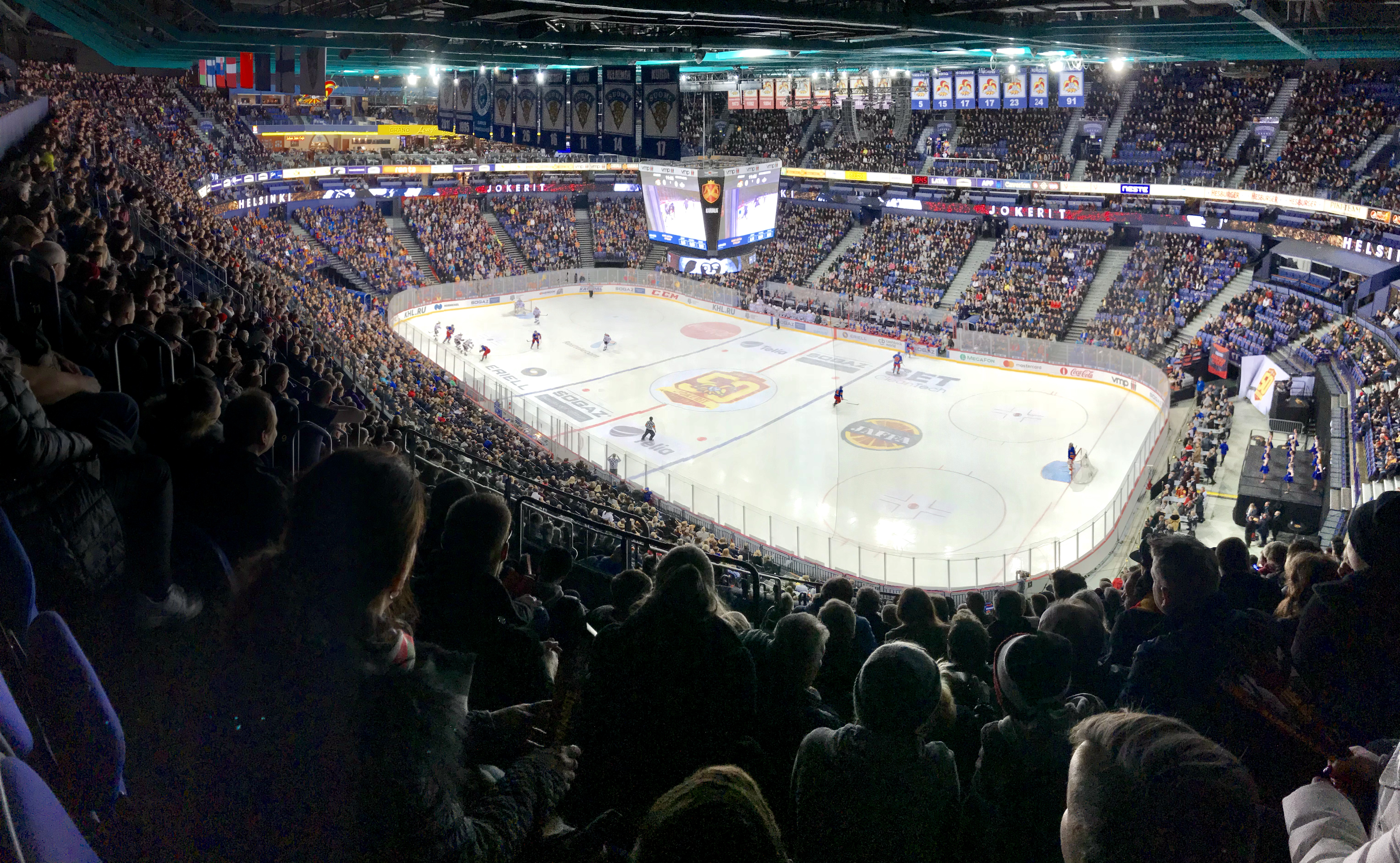
Hartwall Arena from inside during an ice hockey game

Hartwall Arena's main arena, with an ice surface measuring 60 m x 30 m, was used for all competitions and several practice sessions. The rest of the practice sessions took place at Hartwall Arena's practice rink (58 m x 28 m) and Pirkkola ice rink (for pairs, 60 m x 30 m). Hartwall Arena's main rink and practice rink facilities are in the same venue. Pirkkola practice rink is about four kilometres from Hartwall Arena.

== Records ==
The following new ISU best scores were set during this competition:

Event	Component	Skater(s)	Score	Date	Ref
Ice dance	Short dance	(Canada) Tessa Virtue / Scott Moir	82.43	31 March 2017	
Ladies	Free skate	(Russia) Evgenia Medvedeva	154.40	31 March 2017	
Ladies	Total score	(Russia) Evgenia Medvedeva	233.41	31 March 2017	
Men	Free skate	(Japan) Yuzuru Hanyu	223.20	1 April 2017	
Ice dance	Free dance	(France) Gabriella Papadakis / Guillaume Cizeron	119.15	1 April 2017	
Ice dance	Total score	(Canada) Tessa Virtue / Scott Moir	198.62	1 April 2017	

== Qualification ==
=== Minimum TES ===
Participants were required to have attained minimum technical element scores at an earlier senior international competition. The scores had to be obtained at least 21 days before the first official practice day of the championships.

Minimum technical scores (TES)
Discipline	SP / SD	FS / FD
Men	34	64
Ladies	27	47
Pairs	25	43
Ice dance	29	39
Must be achieved at an ISU-recognized international event in the ongoing or preceding season. SP and FS scores may be attained at different events.

=== Number of entries per discipline ===
Based on the results of the 2016 World Championships, each ISU member nation was allowed to field one to three entries per discipline.

Spots	Men	Ladies	Pairs	Dance
3	Japan	Russia; United States; Japan	Canada; Russia	France; United States; Canada
2	Spain; China; Russia; Canada; Czech Republic; United States	Canada; China	China; Germany; United States; France; Italy	Italy; Great Britain; Russia
If not listed above, one entry is allowed.

== Entries ==
Countries began publishing their selections as early as December 2016. The International Skating Union published a complete list on 9 March 2017.

Nation	Men	Ladies	Pairs	Ice dance
Armenia	Slavik Hayrapetyan	Anastasia Galustyan		Tina Garabedian / Simon Proulx-Sénécal
Australia	Brendan Kerry	Kailani Craine	Ekaterina Alexandrovskaya / Harley Windsor	
Austria		Kerstin Frank	Miriam Ziegler / Severin Kiefer	
Azerbaijan	Larry Loupolover			Anastasia Galyeta / Avidan Brown
Belarus			Tatiana Danilova / Mikalai Kamianchuk	Viktoria Kavaliova / Yurii Bieliaiev
Belgium	Jorik Hendrickx	Loena Hendrickx		
Brazil		Isadora Williams		
Canada	Patrick Chan; Kevin Reynolds	Kaetlyn Osmond; Gabrielle Daleman	Meagan Duhamel / Eric Radford; Liubov Ilyushechkina / Dylan Moscovitch; Julianne Séguin / Charlie Bilodeau	Tessa Virtue / Scott Moir; Kaitlyn Weaver / Andrew Poje; Piper Gilles / Paul Poirier
China	Jin Boyang	Li Zijun; Li Xiangning	Sui Wenjing / Han Cong; Yu Xiaoyu / Zhang Hao	Wang Shiyue / Liu Xinyu
Chinese Taipei	Chih-I Tsao	Amy Lin		
Croatia	Nicholas Vrdoljak		Lana Petranović / Antonio Souza-Kordeiru	
Czech Republic	Michal Březina	Michaela Lucie Hanzlíková	Anna Dušková / Martin Bidař	Nicole Kuzmichová / Alexandr Sinicyn
Denmark				Laurence Fournier Beaudry / Nikolaj Sørensen
Estonia		Helery Hälvin		
Finland	Valtter Virtanen	Emmi Peltonen	Emilia Simonen / Matthew Penasse	Cecilia Törn / Jussiville Partanen
France	Chafik Besseghier	Laurine Lecavelier	Vanessa James / Morgan Cipres; Lola Esbrat / Andrei Novoselov	Gabriella Papadakis / Guillaume Cizeron; Marie-Jade Lauriault / Romain Le Gac; Lorenza Alessandrini / Pierre Souquet
Georgia	Morisi Kvitelashvili			Tatiana Kozmava / Oleksii Shumskyi
Germany	Paul Fentz	Nicole Schott	Aliona Savchenko / Bruno Massot; Minerva Fabienne Hase / Nolan Seegert	Kavita Lorenz / Joti Polizoakis
Great Britain	Graham Newberry	Natasha McKay	Zoe Jones / Christopher Boyadji	Lilah Fear / Lewis Gibson
Hungary		Ivett Tóth	Daria Beklemisheva / Mark Magyar	
Israel	Oleksii Bychenko			Isabella Tobias / Ilia Tkachenko
Italy	Matteo Rizzo	Carolina Kostner	Nicole Della Monica / Matteo Guarise; Valentina Marchei / Ondřej Hotárek	Anna Cappellini / Luca Lanotte; Charlène Guignard / Marco Fabbri
Japan	Yuzuru Hanyu; Shoma Uno; Keiji Tanaka	Wakaba Higuchi; Mai Mihara; Rika Hongo	Sumire Suto / Francis Boudreau-Audet	Kana Muramoto / Chris Reed
Kazakhstan	Denis Ten	Elizabet Tursynbayeva		
Latvia	Deniss Vasiļjevs	Angelīna Kučvaļska		Olga Jakushina / Andrey Nevskiy
Lithuania			Goda Butkutė / Nikita Ermolaev	Taylor Tran / Saulius Ambrulevičius
Malaysia	Julian Zhi Jie Yee			
North Korea			Ryom Tae-ok / Kim Ju-sik	
Norway		Anne Line Gjersem		
Philippines	Michael Christian Martinez			
Poland	Igor Reznichenko			Natalia Kaliszek / Maksym Spodyriev
Russia	Mikhail Kolyada; Maxim Kovtun	Evgenia Medvedeva; Anna Pogorilaya; Maria Sotskova	Ksenia Stolbova / Fedor Klimov; Evgenia Tarasova / Vladimir Morozov; Natalia Zabiiako / Alexander Enbert	Ekaterina Bobrova / Dmitri Soloviev; Alexandra Stepanova / Ivan Bukin
Singapore		Yu Shuran		
Slovakia		Nicole Rajičová		
Slovenia		Daša Grm		
South Korea	Kim Jin-seo	Choi Da-bin		Yura Min / Alexander Gamelin
Spain	Javier Fernández; Javier Raya			Olivia Smart / Adrià Díaz
Sweden	Alexander Majorov	Joshi Helgesson		
Switzerland	Stéphane Walker	Yasmine Kimiko Yamada	Ioulia Chtchetinina / Noah Scherer	
Turkey				Alisa Agafonova / Alper Uçar
Ukraine	Ivan Pavlov	Anna Khnychenkova		Oleksandra Nazarova / Maxim Nikitin
United States	Jason Brown; Nathan Chen	Mariah Bell; Karen Chen; Ashley Wagner	Haven Denney / Brandon Frazier; Alexa Scimeca Knierim / Chris Knierim	Madison Chock / Evan Bates; Madison Hubbell / Zachary Donohue; Maia Shibutani / Alex Shibutani
Uzbekistan	Misha Ge			

=== Changes to initial assignments ===
Announced	Country	Discipline	Initial	Replacement	Refs
March 10, 2017	China	Ladies	Zhao Ziquan	Li Xiangning	
March 13, 2017	Slovakia	Ice dance	Lucie Myslivečková / Lukáš Csölley	None	
March 17, 2017	Italy	Men	Ivan Righini	Matteo Rizzo	
March 17, 2017	South Korea	Pairs	Ji Min-ji / Themistocles Leftheris	None	
March 20, 2017	Japan	Ladies	Satoko Miyahara	Rika Hongo	
March 24, 2017	Netherlands	Ladies	Niki Wories	None	
March 25, 2017	China	Men	Yan Han	None	

== Results ==
=== Men ===
Yuzuru Hanyu set a new world record for the free skating (223.20 points).

Rank	Name	Nation	Total points	SP		FS	
1	Yuzuru Hanyu	Japan	321.59	5	98.39	1	223.20 WR
2	Shoma Uno	Japan	319.31	2	104.86	2	214.45
3	Jin Boyang	China	303.58	4	98.64	3	204.94
4	Javier Fernández	Spain	301.19	1	109.05	6	192.14
5	Patrick Chan	Canada	295.16	3	102.13	5	193.03
6	Nathan Chen	United States	290.72	6	97.33	4	193.39
7	Jason Brown	United States	269.57	8	93.10	7	176.47
8	Mikhail Kolyada	Russia	257.47	7	93.28	9	164.19
9	Kevin Reynolds	Canada	253.84	12	84.44	8	169.40
10	Alexei Bychenko	Israel	245.96	11	85.28	12	160.68
11	Maxim Kovtun	Russia	245.84	10	89.38	14	156.46
12	Misha Ge	Uzbekistan	243.45	16	79.91	10	163.54
13	Moris Kvitelashvili	Georgia	239.24	19	76.34	11	162.90
14	Deniss Vasiļjevs	Latvia	239.00	14	81.73	13	157.27
15	Brendan Kerry	Australia	236.24	13	83.11	15	153.13
16	Denis Ten	Kazakhstan	234.31	9	90.18	20	144.13
17	Chafik Besseghier	France	230.13	17	78.82	16	151.31
18	Michal Březina	Czech Republic	226.26	15	80.02	18	146.24
19	Keiji Tanaka	Japan	222.34	22	73.45	17	148.89
20	Paul Fentz	Germany	217.91	20	73.89	22	144.02
21	Jorik Hendrickx	Belgium	214.02	21	73.68	21	140.34
22	Julian Zhi Jie Yee	Malaysia	213.99	23	69.74	19	144.25
23	Alexander Majorov	Sweden	205.04	18	77.23	23	127.81
24	Michael Christian Martinez	Philippines	196.79	24	69.32	24	127.47
Did not advance to free skating
25	Ivan Pavlov	Ukraine	69.26	25	69.26	—N/a	
26	Kim Jin-seo	South Korea	68.66	26	68.66	—N/a	
27	Javier Raya	Spain	66.88	27	66.88	—N/a	
28	Stéphane Walker	Switzerland	64.04	28	64.04	—N/a	
29	Igor Reznichenko	Poland	63.88	29	63.88	—N/a	
30	Matteo Rizzo	Italy	63.14	30	63.14	—N/a	
31	Graham Newberry	Great Britain	62.04	31	62.04	—N/a	
32	Chih-I Tsao	Chinese Taipei	61.52	32	61.52	—N/a	
33	Valtter Virtanen	Finland	59.45	33	59.45	—N/a	
34	Nicholas Vrdoljak	Croatia	57.28	34	57.28	—N/a	
35	Slavik Hayrapetyan	Armenia	57.14	35	57.14	—N/a	
36	Larry Loupolover	Azerbaijan	38.97	36	38.97	—N/a	

=== Ladies ===
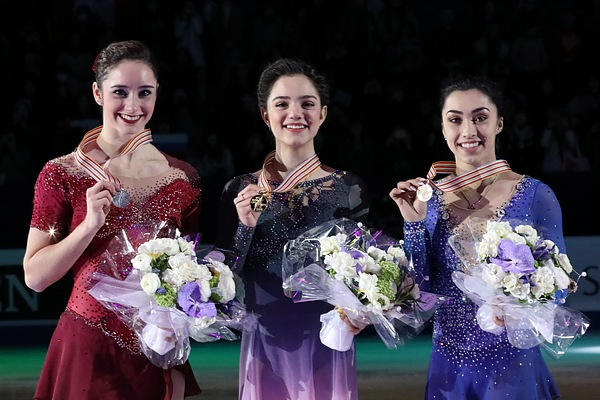
The ladies podium at the 2017 World Championships

Evgenia Medvedeva set a new world record for the free skating (154.40 points) and for the combined total (233.41 points).

Rank	Name	Nation	Total points	SP		FS	
1	Evgenia Medvedeva	Russia	233.41 WR	1	79.01	1	154.40 WR
2	Kaetlyn Osmond	Canada	218.13	2	75.98	2	142.15
3	Gabrielle Daleman	Canada	213.52	3	72.19	3	141.33
4	Karen Chen	United States	199.29	5	69.98	6	129.31
5	Mai Mihara	Japan	197.88	15	59.59	4	138.29
6	Carolina Kostner	Italy	196.83	8	66.33	5	130.50
7	Ashley Wagner	United States	193.54	7	69.04	10	124.50
8	Maria Sotskova	Russia	192.20	6	69.76	11	122.44
9	Elizabet Tursynbayeva	Kazakhstan	191.99	10	65.48	8	126.51
10	Choi Da-bin	South Korea	191.11	11	62.66	7	128.45
11	Wakaba Higuchi	Japan	188.05	9	65.87	12	122.18
12	Mariah Bell	United States	187.23	13	61.02	9	126.21
13	Anna Pogorilaya	Russia	183.37	4	71.52	15	111.85
14	Li Xiangning	China	175.37	16	58.28	13	117.09
15	Loena Hendrickx	Belgium	172.82	17	57.54	14	115.28
16	Rika Hongo	Japan	169.83	12	62.55	18	107.28
17	Nicole Rajičová	Slovakia	165.55	18	57.08	16	108.47
18	Laurine Lecavelier	France	162.99	22	55.49	17	107.50
19	Nicole Schott	Germany	161.41	24	54.83	19	106.58
20	Ivett Tóth	Hungary	160.77	14	61.00	21	99.77
21	Li Zijun	China	159.80	20	56.30	20	103.50
22	Angelīna Kučvaļska	Latvia	155.02	21	55.92	22	99.10
23	Anastasia Galustyan	Armenia	153.47	23	55.20	23	98.27
24	Kailani Craine	Australia	152.94	19	56.97	24	95.97
Did not advance to free skating
25	Yu Shuran	Singapore	52.87	25	52.87	—N/a	
26	Joshi Helgesson	Sweden	52.07	26	52.07	—N/a	
27	Helery Hälvin	Estonia	51.94	27	51.94	—N/a	
28	Amy Lin	Chinese Taipei	51.86	28	51.86	—N/a	
29	Emmi Peltonen	Finland	50.74	29	50.74	—N/a	
30	Isadora Williams	Brazil	50.65	30	50.65	—N/a	
31	Kerstin Frank	Austria	50.54	31	50.54	—N/a	
32	Natasha McKay	Great Britain	50.10	32	50.10	—N/a	
33	Yasmine Kimiko Yamada	Switzerland	47.86	33	47.86	—N/a	
34	Anne Line Gjersem	Norway	46.99	34	46.99	—N/a	
35	Anna Khnychenkova	Ukraine	46.98	35	46.98	—N/a	
36	Daša Grm	Slovenia	46.63	36	46.63	—N/a	
37	Michaela Lucie Hanzlíková	Czech Republic	32.21	37	32.21	—N/a	

=== Pairs ===
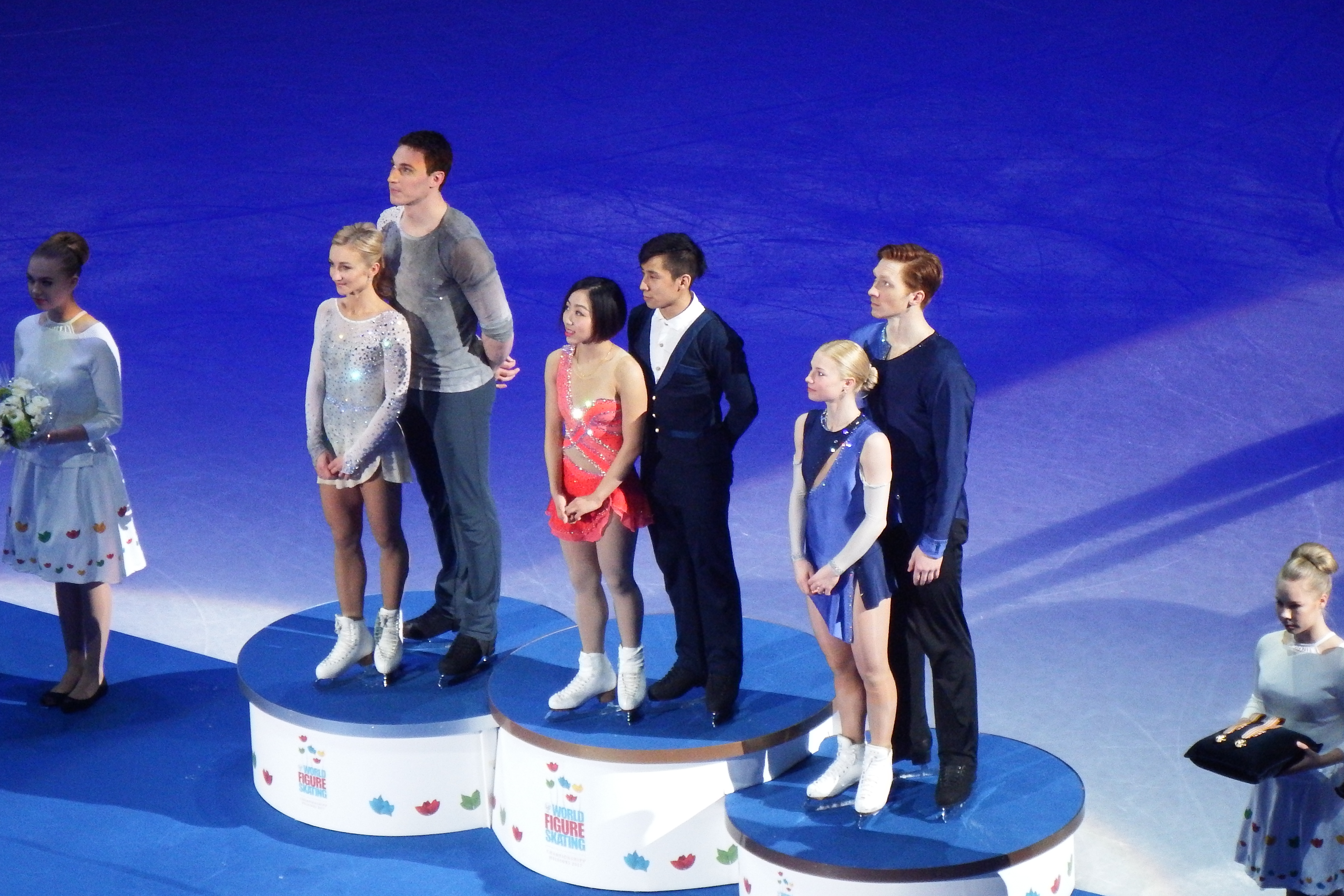
The pairs medalists

Rank	Name	Nation	Total points	SP		FS	
1	Sui Wenjing / Han Cong	China	232.06	1	81.23	1	150.83
2	Aliona Savchenko / Bruno Massot	Germany	230.30	2	79.84	2	150.46
3	Evgenia Tarasova / Vladimir Morozov	Russia	219.03	3	79.37	4	139.66
4	Yu Xiaoyu / Zhang Hao	China	211.51	4	75.23	5	136.28
5	Ksenia Stolbova / Fedor Klimov	Russia	206.72	13	65.69	3	141.03
6	Liubov Ilyushechkina / Dylan Moscovitch	Canada	206.19	6	73.14	8	133.05
7	Meagan Duhamel / Eric Radford	Canada	206.06	7	72.67	7	133.39
8	Vanessa James / Morgan Cipres	France	204.68	10	70.10	6	134.58
9	Valentina Marchei / Ondřej Hotárek	Italy	203.92	9	71.04	9	132.88
10	Alexa Scimeca Knierim / Chris Knierim	United States	202.37	8	72.17	11	130.20
11	Julianne Séguin / Charlie Bilodeau	Canada	198.21	12	66.31	10	131.90
12	Natalia Zabiiako / Alexander Enbert	Russia	192.54	5	74.26	13	118.28
13	Nicole Della Monica / Matteo Guarise	Italy	192.02	11	70.08	12	121.94
14	Anna Dušková / Martin Bidař	Czech Republic	179.70	15	63.36	14	116.34
15	Ryom Tae-ok / Kim Ju-sik	North Korea	169.65	14	64.52	15	105.13
16	Ekaterina Alexandrovskaya / Harley Windsor	Australia	164.10	16	62.03	16	102.07
Did not advance to free skating
17	Sumire Suto / Francis Boudreau-Audet	Japan	61.70	17	61.70	—N/a	
18	Miriam Ziegler / Severin Kiefer	Austria	61.01	18	61.01	—N/a	
19	Minerva Fabienne Hase / Nolan Seegert	Germany	59.76	19	59.76	—N/a	
20	Haven Denney / Brandon Frazier	United States	56.23	20	56.23	—N/a	
21	Lana Petranović / Antonio Souza-Kordeiru	Croatia	52.83	21	52.83	—N/a	
22	Goda Butkutė / Nikita Ermolaev	Lithuania	52.49	22	52.49	—N/a	
23	Tatiana Danilova / Mikalai Kamianchuk	Belarus	51.79	23	51.79	—N/a	
24	Daria Beklemisheva / Mark Magyar	Hungary	45.96	24	45.96	—N/a	
25	Emilia Simonen / Matthew Penasse	Finland	45.49	25	45.49	—N/a	
26	Zoe Jones / Christopher Boyadji	Great Britain	44.33	26	44.33	—N/a	
27	Lola Esbrat / Andrei Novoselov	France	43.78	27	43.78	—N/a	
28	Ioulia Chtchetinina / Noah Scherer	Switzerland	40.50	28	40.50	—N/a	

=== Ice dance ===
Tessa Virtue and Scott Moir set a new world record for the short dance (82.43 points) and for the combined total (198.62 points). Gabriella Papadakis and Guillaume Cizeron set a new world record for the free dance (119.15 points).

Rank	Name	Nation	Total points	SD		FD	
1	Tessa Virtue / Scott Moir	Canada	198.62 WR	1	82.43	2	116.19
2	Gabriella Papadakis / Guillaume Cizeron	France	196.04	2	76.89	1	119.15
3	Maia Shibutani / Alex Shibutani	United States	185.18	5	74.88	4	110.30
4	Kaitlyn Weaver / Andrew Poje	Canada	184.81	6	74.84	6	109.97
5	Ekaterina Bobrova / Dmitri Soloviev	Russia	184.06	8	73.54	3	110.52
6	Anna Cappellini / Luca Lanotte	Italy	183.73	7	73.70	5	110.03
7	Madison Chock / Evan Bates	United States	182.04	4	76.25	8	105.79
8	Piper Gilles / Paul Poirier	Canada	178.99	9	72.83	7	106.16
9	Madison Hubbell / Zachary Donohue	United States	177.70	3	76.53	10	101.17
10	Alexandra Stepanova / Ivan Bukin	Russia	174.70	10	69.07	9	105.63
11	Charlène Guignard / Marco Fabbri	Italy	165.68	11	67.56	11	98.12
12	Isabella Tobias / Ilia Tkachenko	Israel	162.63	12	66.27	12	96.36
13	Laurence Fournier Beaudry / Nikolaj Sørensen	Denmark	159.53	13	66.05	14	93.48
14	Natalia Kaliszek / Maksym Spodyriev	Poland	157.15	15	63.37	13	93.78
15	Oleksandra Nazarova / Maxim Nikitin	Ukraine	155.35	14	63.86	15	91.49
16	Wang Shiyue / Liu Xinyu	China	150.25	18	60.77	16	89.48
17	Alisa Agafonova / Alper Uçar	Turkey	146.89	17	60.80	17	86.09
18	Olivia Smart / Adrià Díaz	Spain	145.61	16	60.93	19	84.68
19	Kavita Lorenz / Joti Polizoakis	Germany	142.86	20	57.10	18	85.76
20	Yura Min / Alexander Gamelin	South Korea	136.71	19	57.47	20	79.24
Did not advance to free dance
21	Marie-Jade Lauriault / Romain Le Gac	France	56.43	21	56.43	—N/a	
22	Lilah Fear / Lewis Gibson	Great Britain	54.82	22	54.82	—N/a	
23	Kana Muramoto / Chris Reed	Japan	54.68	23	54.68	—N/a	
24	Cecilia Törn / Jussiville Partanen	Finland	52.22	24	52.22	—N/a	
25	Tina Garabedian / Simon Proulx-Sénécal	Armenia	51.39	25	51.39	—N/a	
26	Nicole Kuzmichová / Alexandr Sinicyn	Czech Republic	51.02	26	51.02	—N/a	
27	Viktoria Kavaliova / Yurii Bieliaiev	Belarus	49.73	27	49.73	—N/a	
28	Lorenza Alessandrini / Pierre Souquet	France	49.51	28	49.51	—N/a	
29	Olga Jakushina / Andrey Nevskiy	Latvia	48.26	29	48.26	—N/a	
30	Taylor Tran / Saulius Ambrulevičius	Lithuania	46.14	30	46.14	—N/a	
31	Anastasia Galyeta / Avidan Brown	Azerbaijan	45.58	31	45.58	—N/a	
32	Tatiana Kozmava / Oleksii Shumskyi	Georgia	42.71	32	42.71	—N/a	

== Medals summary ==
=== Medalists ===
Medals for overall placement:

Discipline	Gold	Silver	Bronze
Men	(Japan) Yuzuru Hanyu	(Japan) Shoma Uno	(China) Jin Boyang
Ladies	(Russia) Evgenia Medvedeva	(Canada) Kaetlyn Osmond	(Canada) Gabrielle Daleman
Pairs	(China) Sui Wenjing / Han Cong	(Germany) Aliona Savchenko / Bruno Massot	(Russia) Evgenia Tarasova / Vladimir Morozov
Ice dancing	(Canada) Tessa Virtue / Scott Moir	(France) Gabriella Papadakis / Guillaume Cizeron	(United States) Maia Shibutani / Alex Shibutani

Small medals for placement in the short segment:

Discipline	Gold	Silver	Bronze
Men	(Spain) Javier Fernández	(Japan) Shoma Uno	(Canada) Patrick Chan
Ladies	(Russia) Evgenia Medvedeva	(Canada) Kaetlyn Osmond	(Canada) Gabrielle Daleman
Pairs	(China) Sui Wenjing / Han Cong	(Germany) Aliona Savchenko / Bruno Massot	(Russia) Evgenia Tarasova / Vladimir Morozov
Ice dancing	(Canada) Tessa Virtue / Scott Moir	(France) Gabriella Papadakis / Guillaume Cizeron	(United States) Madison Hubbell / Zachary Donohue

Small medals for placement in the free segment:

Discipline	Gold	Silver	Bronze
Men	(Japan) Yuzuru Hanyu	(Japan) Shoma Uno	(China) Jin Boyang
Ladies	(Russia) Evgenia Medvedeva	(Canada) Kaetlyn Osmond	(Canada) Gabrielle Daleman
Pairs	(China) Sui Wenjing / Han Cong	(Germany) Aliona Savchenko / Bruno Massot	(Russia) Ksenia Stolbova / Fedor Klimov
Ice dancing	(France) Gabriella Papadakis / Guillaume Cizeron	(Canada) Tessa Virtue / Scott Moir	(Russia) Ekaterina Bobrova / Dmitri Soloviev

=== By country ===
Table of medals for overall placement:

Rank	Nation	Gold	Silver	Bronze	Total
1	Canada (CAN)	1	1	1	3
2	Japan (JPN)	1	1	0	2
3	China (CHN)	1	0	1	2
3	Russia (RUS)	1	0	1	2
5	France (FRA)	0	1	0	1
5	Germany (GER)	0	1	0	1
7	United States (USA)	0	0	1	1
Totals (7 entries)		4	4	4	12
