= 2016–17 figure skating season =

Competitive figure skating year, 2016/7/1 to 2017/6/30

- Date: July 1, 2016 – June 30, 2017
- Previous: 2015–16
- Next: 2017–18

The 2016–17 figure skating season began on July 1, 2016, and ended on June 30, 2017. During this season, elite skaters competed at the 2017 European Championships, Four Continents Championships, World Junior Championships, and World Championships. They also competed at elite events such as the Grand Prix series and Junior Grand Prix series, culminating at the Grand Prix Final, and the Challenger Series.

== Age eligibility ==
Skaters were eligible to compete in International Skating Union (ISU) events at the junior or senior levels according to their age. These rules may not have applied to non-ISU events such as national championships.

Level	Date of birth
Junior (females in all disciplines; males in singles)	Born between July 1, 1997 & June 30, 2003
Junior (males in pairs & ice dance)	Born between July 1, 1995 & June 30, 2003
Senior (all disciplines)	Born before July 1, 2001

== Changes ==
If skaters of different nationalities formed a team, the ISU required that they choose one country to represent. The date provided is the date when the change occurred or, if not available, the date when the change was announced.

=== Partnership changes ===
Date	Skaters	Disc.	Type	Ref.
July 11, 2016	(Slovakia) Federica Testa / Lukáš Csölley	Ice dance	Dissolved	
July 11, 2016	(Slovakia) Lucie Myslivečková / Lukáš Csölley	Ice dance	Formed	
July 13, 2016	(Canada) Madeline Edwards / Zhao Kai Pang	Ice dance	Dissolved	
July 14, 2016	(United States) Deanna Stellato / Nathan Bartholomay	Pairs	Formed	
July 24, 2016	(Canada) Natasha Purich / Davin Portz	Pairs	Formed	
August 1, 2016	(United Kingdom) Emily Hayward / Hamish Gaman	Pairs	Formed	
August 10, 2016	(United States) Madeline Aaron / Max Settlage	Pairs	Dissolved	
August 11, 2016	(Poland) Justyna Plutowska / Jérémie Flemin	Ice dance	Formed	
August 11, 2016	(Italy) Rebecca Ghilardi / Filippo Ambrosini	Pairs	Formed	
September 7, 2016	(Canada) Élisabeth Paradis / François-Xavier Ouellette	Ice dance	Dissolved	
November 17, 2016	(Russia) Vera Bazarova / Andrei Deputat	Pairs	Dissolved	
December 25, 2016	(Hungary) Anna Yanovskaya / Ádám Lukács	Ice dance	Formed	
January 10, 2017	(Germany) Mari Vartmann / Ruben Blommaert	Pairs	Dissolved	
February 9, 2017	(Germany) Annika Hocke / Ruben Blommaert	Pairs	Formed	
February 22, 2017	(Germany) Mari Vartmann / Matti Landgraf	Pairs	Formed	
March 3, 2017	(United States) Winter Deardorff / Max Settlage	Pairs	Formed	
April 15, 2017	(Lithuania) Taylor Tran / Saulius Ambrulevičius	Ice dance	Dissolved	
May 18, 2017	(Russia) Elena Ilinykh / Ruslan Zhiganshin	Ice dance	Dissolved	

=== Retirements ===
Date	Skater(s)	Disc.	Ref.
July 11, 2016	(Slovakia) Federica Testa	Ice dance	
July 12, 2016	(Argentina) Denis Margalik	Men	
July 13, 2016	(Canada) Zhao Kai Pang	Ice dance	
July 28, 2016	(Canada) Andrei Rogozine	Men	
August 3, 2016	(Austria) Barbora Silná / Juri Kurakin	Ice dance	
August 4, 2016	(Canada) Andréanne Poulin / Marc-André Servant	Ice dance	
December 15, 2016	(Canada) Alexandra Paul / Mitchell Islam	Ice dance	
February 23, 2017	(United States) Meryl Davis / Charlie White	Ice dance	
March 31, 2017	(Russia) Evgeni Plushenko	Men	
April 10, 2017	(Japan) Mao Asada	Ladies	
April 15, 2017	(Lithuania) Taylor Tran	Ice dance	
April 23, 2017	(Japan) Kanako Murakami	Ladies	
May 3, 2017	(United States) Anastasia Cannuscio / Colin McManus	Ice dance	
May 8, 2017	(Japan) Emi Hirai / Marien de la Asuncion	Ice dance	
May 18, 2017	(Russia) Ruslan Zhiganshin	Ice dance	
April 3, 2017	(South Korea) Lee Ho-jung	Ice dance	
June 22, 2017	(United States) Jeremy Abbott	Men	

=== Coaching changes ===
Date	Skater(s)	Disc.	From	To	Ref.
July 8, 2016	(United States) Tomoki Hiwatashi	Men	Alexander Ouriashev & Osadolo Irowa	Kori Ade	
July 21, 2016	(United States) Vincent Zhou	Men	Tom Zakrajsek & Becky Calvin	Tammy Gambill	
August 10, 2016	(United States) Courtney Hicks	Ladies	Jere Michael & Alex Chang	Todd Sand & John Nicks	
August 23, 2016	(United States) Hannah Miller	Ladies	Rafael Arutunian	Tammy Gambill	
August 23, 2016	(United States) Mariah Bell	Ladies	Kori Ade, Rohene Ward & Billy Schneider	Rafael Arutunian	
August 23, 2016	(France) Romain Ponsart	Men	Brian Joubert	Rafael Arutunian	
August 25, 2016	(Latvia) Deniss Vasiļjevs	Men	Alexei Urmanov & Ingrida Snieškienė	Stéphane Lambiel	
August 30, 2016	(Australia) Brooklee Han	Ladies	Serhii Vaypan	Peter Cain & Darlene Cain	
January 22, 2017	(United States) Gracie Gold	Ladies	Frank Carroll	Marina Zueva & Oleg Epstein	
April 4, 2017	(Russia) Adelina Sotnikova	Ladies	Elena Vodorezova	Evgeni Plushenko	
April 28, 2017	(Russia) Elena Radionova	Ladies	Inna Goncharenko	Elena Vodorezova	

== International competitions ==
Code key

- S – Senior event
- J – Junior event
- N – Novice event
- M – Men's singles
- L – Ladies' singles
- P – Pair skating
- D – Ice dance

Color key

- ISU Championships
- Grand Prix or Junior Grand Prix
- Challenger Series
- Other competition

2016
Dates	Event	Type	Level	Disc.	Location	Results
July 29–30	Lake Placid Ice Dance International	Other	S/J	D	Lake Placid, United States	Details
August 4–7	Asian Open Trophy	Other	All	M/L/P	Manila, Philippines	Details
August 24–28	JGP France	Grand Prix	Junior	M/L/D	Saint-Gervais-les-Bains, France	Details
August 31 – September 4	JGP Czech Republic	Grand Prix	Junior	All	Ostrava, Czech Republic	Details
September 7–11	JGP Japan	Grand Prix	Junior	M/L/D	Yokohama, Japan	Details
September 8–11	Lombardia Trophy	Challenger	S/J	All	Bergamo, Italy	Details
September 14–18	U.S. International Classic	Challenger	Senior	All	Salt Lake City, United States	Details
September 14–18	JGP Russia	Grand Prix	Junior	All	Saransk, Russia	Details
September 21–25	JGP Slovenia	Grand Prix	Junior	M/L/D	Ljubljana, Slovenia	Details
September 22–24	Nebelhorn Trophy	Challenger	Senior	All	Oberstdorf, Germany	Details
September 28 – October 2	JGP Estonia	Grand Prix	Junior	All	Tallinn, Estonia	Details
September 29 – October 1	Autumn Classic International	Challenger	S/J	All	Montreal, Canada	Details
September 30 – October 2	Ondrej Nepela Memorial	Challenger	Senior	All	Bratislava, Slovakia	Details
October 1	Japan Open	Other	Senior	M/L	Saitama, Japan	Details
October 5–9	JGP Germany	Grand Prix	Junior	All	Dresden, Germany	Details
October 6–10	Finlandia Trophy	Challenger	Senior	All	Espoo, Finland	Details
October 18–23	Denkova-Staviski Cup	Other	All	M/L	Sofia, Bulgaria	Details
October 19–23	International Cup of Nice	Other	S/J	All	Nice, France	Details
October 21–23	Skate America	Grand Prix	Senior	All	Chicago, United States	Details
October 27–30	Golden Bear of Zagreb	Other	All	M/L/P	Zagreb, Croatia	Details
October 28–30	Skate Canada International	Grand Prix	Senior	All	Mississauga, Canada	Details
November 3–6	Tirnavia Ice Cup	Other	J/N	M/L	Trnava, Slovakia	Details
November 3–6	Crystal Skate of Romania	Other	All	M/L	Miercurea Ciuc, Romania	Details
November 4–6	Rostelecom Cup	Grand Prix	Senior	All	Moscow, Russia	Details
November 4–6	NRW Trophy	Other	All	D	Dortmund, Germany	Details
November 9–13	Volvo Open Cup	Other	All	All	Riga, Latvia	Details
November 10–13	Merano Cup	Other	All	M/L/P	Merano, Italy	Details
November 11–13	Trophée de France	Grand Prix	Senior	All	Paris, France	Details
November 16–20	Open d'Andorra	Other	Senior	L/D	Canillo, Andorra	Details
November 16–20	Open d'Andorra	Other	J/N	M/L/D	Canillo, Andorra	Details
November 17–20	Warsaw Cup	Challenger	Senior	All	Warsaw, Poland	Details
November 18–20	Cup of China	Grand Prix	Senior	All	Beijing, China	Details
November 18–20	Ice Star	Other	All	M/L/D	Minsk, Belarus	Details
November 18–19	Pavel Roman Memorial	Other	J/N	D	Olomouc, Czech Republic	Details
November 19–27	Tallinn Trophy	Challenger	All	All	Tallinn, Estonia	Details
November 23–27	Skate Celje	Other	J/N	M/L	Celje, Slovenia	Details
November 25–27	NHK Trophy	Grand Prix	Senior	All	Sapporo, Japan	Details
November 30 – December 4	NRW Trophy	Other	All	M/L/P	Dortmund, Germany	Details
December 6–11	Santa Claus Cup	Other	All	M/L/D	Budapest, Hungary	Details
December 7–10	Golden Spin of Zagreb	Challenger	Senior	All	Zagreb, Croatia	Details
December 8–11	Grand Prix Final	Grand Prix	S/J	All	Marseille, France	Details
December 16–18	Grand Prix of Bratislava	Other	J/N	M/L/D	Bratislava, Slovakia	Details

2017
Dates	Event	Type	Level	Disc.	Location	Results
January 4–7	EduSport Trophy	Other	Senior	L	Bucharest, Romania	
January 4–7	EduSport Trophy	Other	J/N	M/L	Bucharest, Romania	
January 5–7	FBMA Trophy	Other	All	M/L	Abu Dhabi, United Arab Emirates	Details
January 10–15	Mentor Toruń Cup	Other	All	All	Toruń, Poland	Details
January 17–21	Skate Helena	Other	All	M/L	Belgrade, Serbia	Details
January 25–29	European Championships	Championships	Senior	All	Ostrava, Czech Republic	Details
January 31 – February 5	Winter Universiade	Other	Senior	M/L/D	Almaty, Kazakhstan	Details 1, 2
February 2–5	Jégvirág Cup	Other	All	M/L	Miskolc, Hungary	Details
February 3–5	Reykjavik International Games	Other	Senior	L	Reykjavík, Iceland	Details
February 3–5	Reykjavik International Games	Other	Junior	M/L	Reykjavík, Iceland	Details
February 8–12	Sofia Trophy	Other	All	M/L	Sofia, Bulgaria	Details
February 9–12	Dragon Trophy	Other	All	M/L	Ljubljana, Slovenia	Details
February 11–18	European Youth Olympic Winter Festival	Other	Junior	M/L	Erzurum, Turkey	Details 1, 2
February 14–19	Bavarian Open	Other	All	All	Oberstdorf, Germany	Details
February 14–19	Four Continents Championships	Championships	Senior	All	Gangneung, South Korea	Details
February 16–19	Olympic Hopes	Other	J/N	M/L	Brasov, Romania	Details
February 21–25	Open Ice Mall Cup	Other	J/N	M/L	Eilat, Israel	Details
February 23–26	Asian Winter Games	Other	Senior	All	Sapporo, Japan	Details
February 23–26	International Challenge Cup	Other	All	M/L/P	The Hague, Netherlands	Details
February 28 – March 5	Cup of Tyrol	Other	All	M/L/P	Innsbruck, Austria	Details
March 2–5	Nordic Championships	Other	J/N	M/L	Reykjavík, Iceland	Details
March 10–12	Coupe du Printemps	Other	J/N	M/L	Kockelscheuer, Luxembourg	Details
March 15–19	World Junior Championships	Championships	Junior	All	Taipei, Taiwan	Details
March 29 – April 2	World Championships	Championships	Senior	All	Helsinki, Finland	Details
April 5–9	Triglav Trophy	Other	All	M/L	Jesenice, Slovenia	Details
April 6–9	Egna Spring Trophy	Other	All	All	Egna, Italy	Details
April 20–23	World Team Trophy	Other	Senior	All	Tokyo, Japan	Details

== International medalists ==
=== Men's singles ===
Championships
Competition	Gold	Silver	Bronze	Results
(Czech Republic) European Championships	(Spain) Javier Fernández	(Russia) Maxim Kovtun	(Russia) Mikhail Kolyada	Details
(South Korea) Four Continents Championships	(United States) Nathan Chen	(Japan) Yuzuru Hanyu	(Japan) Shoma Uno	Details
(Taiwan) World Junior Championships	(United States) Vincent Zhou	(Russia) Dmitri Aliev	(Russia) Alexander Samarin	Details
(Finland) World Championships	(Japan) Yuzuru Hanyu	(Japan) Shoma Uno	(China) Jin Boyang	Details

Grand Prix
Competition	Gold	Silver	Bronze	Results
(United States) Skate America	(Japan) Shoma Uno	(United States) Jason Brown	(United States) Adam Rippon	Details
Skate Canada International	(Canada) Patrick Chan	(Japan) Yuzuru Hanyu	(Canada) Kevin Reynolds	Details
(Russia) Rostelecom Cup	(Spain) Javier Fernández	(Japan) Shoma Uno	(Israel) Oleksii Bychenko	Details
Trophée de France	(Spain) Javier Fernández	(Kazakhstan) Denis Ten	(United States) Adam Rippon	Details
Cup of China	(Canada) Patrick Chan	(China) Jin Boyang	(Russia) Sergei Voronov	Details
(Japan) NHK Trophy	(Japan) Yuzuru Hanyu	(United States) Nathan Chen	(Japan) Keiji Tanaka	Details
(France) Grand Prix Final	(Japan) Yuzuru Hanyu	(United States) Nathan Chen	(Japan) Shoma Uno	Details

Junior Grand Prix
Competition	Gold	Silver	Bronze	Results
JGP France	(Russia) Roman Savosin	(Russia) Ilia Skirda	(Japan) Koshiro Shimada	Details
JGP Czech Republic	(Russia) Dmitri Aliev	(United States) Alexei Krasnozhon	(Russia) Roman Savosin	Details
JGP Japan	(South Korea) Cha Jun-hwan	(United States) Vincent Zhou	(Russia) Alexey Erokhov	Details
JGP Russia	(Russia) Alexander Samarin	(United States) Andrew Torgashev	(Czech Republic) Matyáš Bělohradský	Details
JGP Slovenia	(United States) Alexei Krasnozhon	(Russia) Ilia Skirda	(Japan) Kazuki Tomono	Details
JGP Estonia	(Russia) Alexander Samarin	(Canada) Roman Sadovsky	(United States) Vincent Zhou	Details
JGP Germany	(South Korea) Cha Jun-hwan	(Canada) Conrad Orzel	(Japan) Mitsuki Sumoto	Details
(France) JGP Final	(Russia) Dmitri Aliev	(Russia) Alexander Samarin	(South Korea) Cha Jun-hwan	Details

Challenger Series
Competition	Gold	Silver	Bronze	Results
(Italy) Lombardia Trophy	(Japan) Shoma Uno	(United States) Jason Brown	(United States) Max Aaron	Details
(United States) U.S. International Classic	(United States) Jason Brown	(Japan) Takahito Mura	(United States) Adam Rippon	Details
(Germany) Nebelhorn Trophy	(Russia) Alexander Petrov	(Belgium) Jorik Hendrickx	(United States) Grant Hochstein	Details
(Canada) Autumn Classic International	(Japan) Yuzuru Hanyu	(Uzbekistan) Misha Ge	(United States) Max Aaron	Details
(Slovakia) Ondrej Nepela Memorial	(Russia) Sergei Voronov	(Canada) Kevin Reynolds	(Russia) Roman Savosin	Details
(Finland) Finlandia Trophy	(United States) Nathan Chen	(Canada) Patrick Chan	(Russia) Maxim Kovtun	Details
(Poland) Warsaw Cup	(Sweden) Alexander Majorov	(Russia) Dmitri Aliev	(Switzerland) Stéphane Walker	Details
(Estonia) Tallinn Trophy	(Russia) Roman Savosin	(Russia) Anton Shulepov	(United States) Andrew Torgashev	Details
(Croatia) Golden Spin of Zagreb	(Israel) Oleksii Bychenko	(Israel) Daniel Samohin	(Canada) Keegan Messing	Details

Other international competitions
Competition	Gold	Silver	Bronze	Results
(Philippines) Asian Open Trophy	(Japan) Keiji Tanaka	(South Korea) Kim Jin-Seo	(Malaysia) Julian Zhi Jie Yee	Details
(Bulgaria) Denkova-Staviski Cup	(Italy) Maurizio Zandron	(United Kingdom) Graham Newberry	(Italy) Dario Betti	Details
(France) Cup of Nice	(France) Chafik Besseghier	(Russia) Anton Shulepov	(Russia) Makar Ignatov	Details
(Croatia) Golden Bear of Zagreb	(France) Kevin Aymoz	(United Kingdom) Phillip Harris	(Switzerland) Stéphane Walker	Details
Crystal Skate of Romania	(Romania) Dorjan Kecskes	No other competitors		
(Latvia) Volvo Open Cup	(Russia) Alexander Samarin	(Russia) Igor Efimchuk	(Russia) Artem Lezheev	Details
(Italy) Merano Cup	(Switzerland) Stéphane Walker	(Italy) Maurizio Zandron	(United Kingdom) Graham Newberry	Details
(Belarus) Ice Star	(Ukraine) Ivan Pavlov	(Georgia (country)) Irakli Maysuradze	(Azerbaijan) Larry Loupolover	Details
(Germany) NRW Trophy	(Sweden) Alexander Majorov	(Germany) Paul Fentz	(France) Romain Ponsart	Details
(Hungary) Santa Claus Cup	(Georgia (country)) Moris Kvitelashvili	(Georgia (country)) Irakli Maysuradze	(Spain) Felipe Montoya	Details
(United Arab Emirates) FBMA Trophy	(France) Chafik Besseghier	(Switzerland) Nurullah Sahaka	(Hong Kong) Harry Hau Yin Lee	Details
(Poland) Mentor Toruń Cup	(Italy) Matteo Rizzo	(Germany) Peter Liebers	(Germany) Paul Fentz	Details
(Serbia) Skate Helena	(Italy) Mattia Dalla Torre	No other competitors		
(Kazakhstan) Winter Universiade	(Kazakhstan) Denis Ten	(Japan) Keiji Tanaka	(Sweden) Alexander Majorov	Details
(Bulgaria) Sofia Trophy	(United Kingdom) Harry Mattick	(Switzerland) Lukas Britschgi	(Armenia) Slavik Hayrapetyan	Details
(Slovenia) Dragon Trophy	(Czech Republic) Petr Kotlařík	(Italy) Alessandro Fadini	(Turkey) Mehmet Çakir	Details
(Germany) Bavarian Open	(United States) Vincent Zhou	(Japan) Hiroaki Sato	(Japan) Shu Nakamura	Details
(Japan) Asian Winter Games	(Japan) Shoma Uno	(China) Jin Boyang	(China) Yan Han	Details
(Netherlands) International Challenge Cup	(Belgium) Jorik Hendrickx	(United States) Jordan Moeller	(Georgia (country)) Moris Kvitelashvili	Details
(Austria) Cup of Tyrol	(Latvia) Deniss Vasiļjevs	(Israel) Oleksii Bychenko	(Israel) Daniel Samohin	Details
(Iceland) Nordic Championships	(France) Chafik Besseghier	(Sweden) Ondrej Spiegl	(Estonia) Daniel Albert Naurits	Details
(Luxembourg) Coupe du Printemps	(Japan) Shoma Uno	(Japan) Takahito Mura	(Armenia) Slavik Hayrapetyan	Details
(Italy) Egna Spring Trophy	(Italy) Marco Zandron	(Italy) Alessandro Fadini	(Estonia) Aleksandr Selevko	Details
(Slovenia) Triglav Trophy	(Russia) Alexander Petrov	(Russia) Andrei Lazukin	(Italy) Dario Betti	Details

=== Ladies' singles ===
Championships
Competition	Gold	Silver	Bronze	Results
(Czech Republic) European Championships	(Russia) Evgenia Medvedeva	(Russia) Anna Pogorilaya	(Italy) Carolina Kostner	Details
(South Korea) Four Continents Championships	(Japan) Mai Mihara	(Canada) Gabrielle Daleman	(United States) Mirai Nagasu	Details
(Taiwan) World Junior Championships	(Russia) Alina Zagitova	(Japan) Marin Honda	(Japan) Kaori Sakamoto	Details
(Finland) World Championships	(Russia) Evgenia Medvedeva	(Canada) Kaetlyn Osmond	(Canada) Gabrielle Daleman	Details

Grand Prix
Competition	Gold	Silver	Bronze	Results
(United States) Skate America	(United States) Ashley Wagner	(United States) Mariah Bell	(Japan) Mai Mihara	Details
Skate Canada International	(Russia) Evgenia Medvedeva	(Canada) Kaetlyn Osmond	(Japan) Satoko Miyahara	Details
(Russia) Rostelecom Cup	(Russia) Anna Pogorilaya	(Russia) Elena Radionova	(United States) Courtney Hicks	Details
Trophée de France	(Russia) Evgenia Medvedeva	(Russia) Maria Sotskova	(Japan) Wakaba Higuchi	Details
Cup of China	(Russia) Elena Radionova	(Canada) Kaetlyn Osmond	(Russia) Elizaveta Tuktamysheva	Details
(Japan) NHK Trophy	(Russia) Anna Pogorilaya	(Japan) Satoko Miyahara	(Russia) Maria Sotskova	Details
(France) Grand Prix Final	(Russia) Evgenia Medvedeva	(Japan) Satoko Miyahara	(Russia) Anna Pogorilaya	Details

Junior Grand Prix
Competition	Gold	Silver	Bronze	Results
JGP France	(Russia) Alina Zagitova	(Japan) Kaori Sakamoto	(Japan) Rin Nitaya	Details
JGP Czech Republic	(Russia) Anastasiia Gubanova	(Japan) Rika Kihira	(Russia) Alisa Lozko	Details
JGP Japan	(Japan) Kaori Sakamoto	(Japan) Marin Honda	(Japan) Mako Yamashita	Details
JGP Russia	(Russia) Polina Tsurskaya	(Russia) Stanislava Konstantinova	(Russia) Elizaveta Nugumanova	Details
JGP Slovenia	(Japan) Rika Kihira	(Japan) Marin Honda	(Russia) Alina Zagitova	Details
JGP Estonia	(Russia) Polina Tsurskaya	(Russia) Elizaveta Nugumanova	(Japan) Mako Yamashita	Details
JGP Germany	(Russia) Anastasiia Gubanova	(Japan) Yuna Shiraiwa	(South Korea) Lim Eun-soo	Details
(France) JGP Final	(Russia) Alina Zagitova	(Russia) Anastasiia Gubanova	(Japan) Kaori Sakamoto	Details

Challenger Series
Competition	Gold	Silver	Bronze	Results
(Italy) Lombardia Trophy	(Japan) Wakaba Higuchi	(South Korea) Kim Na-hyun	(United States) Mirai Nagasu	Details
(United States) U.S. International Classic	(Japan) Satoko Miyahara	(United States) Mariah Bell	(United States) Karen Chen	Details
(Germany) Nebelhorn Trophy	(Japan) Mai Mihara	(Russia) Elizaveta Tuktamysheva	(Canada) Gabrielle Daleman	Details
(Canada) Autumn Classic International	(United States) Mirai Nagasu	(Canada) Alaine Chartrand	(Kazakhstan) Elizabet Tursynbayeva	Details
(Slovakia) Ondrej Nepela Memorial	(Russia) Maria Sotskova	(Russia) Yulia Lipnitskaya	(United States) Mariah Bell	Details
(Finland) Finlandia Trophy	(Canada) Kaetlyn Osmond	(Japan) Mao Asada	(Russia) Anna Pogorilaya	Details
(Poland) Warsaw Cup	(Germany) Nicole Schott	(Australia) Kailani Craine	(Russia) Alexandra Avstriyskaya	Details
(Estonia) Tallinn Trophy	(Russia) Stanislava Konstantinova	(Russia) Serafima Sakhanovich	(United States) Bradie Tennell	Details
(Croatia) Golden Spin of Zagreb	(Italy) Carolina Kostner	(Russia) Elizaveta Tuktamysheva	(Russia) Alena Leonova	Details

Other international competitions
Competition	Gold	Silver	Bronze	Results
(Philippines) Asian Open Trophy	(Japan) Yura Matsuda	(South Korea) Choi Da-bin	(Chinese Taipei) Amy Lin	Details
(Bulgaria) Denkova-Staviski Cup	(Austria) Natalie Klotz	(United Kingdom) Kristen Spours	(United Kingdom) Anna Litvinenko	Details
(France) Cup of Nice	(France) Maé-Bérénice Méité	(Belgium) Loena Hendrickx	(France) Laurine Lecavelier	Details
(Croatia) Golden Bear of Zagreb	(France) Laurine Lecavelier	(Italy) Giada Russo	(Germany) Nicole Schott	Details
Crystal Skate of Romania	(Romania) Julia Sauter	No other competitors		
(Latvia) Volvo Open Cup	(Latvia) Angelīna Kučvaļska	(Hungary) Ivett Tóth	(Australia) Kailani Craine	Details
(Italy) Merano Cup	(Italy) Giada Russo	(South Korea) Choi Yu-jin	(United Kingdom) Kristen Spours	Details
(Belarus) Ice Star	(Ukraine) Anna Khnychenkova	(Russia) Evgeniia Ivankova	(South Korea) Kim Sena	Details
Open d'Andorra	(United Kingdom) Natasha McKay	(Spain) Valentina Matos	(South Africa) Michaela du Toit	Details
(Germany) NRW Trophy	(Germany) Nicole Schott	(Belgium) Loena Hendrickx	(Germany) Nathalie Weinzierl	Details
(Hungary) Santa Claus Cup	(Hungary) Ivett Tóth	(Brazil) Isadora Williams	(Romania) Julia Sauter	Details
(Romania) EduSport Trophy	(Norway) Anne Line Gjersem	No other competitors		
(United Arab Emirates) FBMA Trophy	(Finland) Emmi Peltonen	(Austria) Kerstin Frank	(Slovenia) Dasa Grm	Details
(Poland) Mentor Toruń Cup	(France) Laurine Lecavelier	(France) Mae Berenice Meite	(Armenia) Anastasia Galustyan	Details
(Serbia) Skate Helena	(United Kingdom) Natasha McKay	(United Kingdom) Kristen Spours	(United Kingdom) Karly Robertson	Details
(Kazakhstan) Winter Universiade	(Russia) Elena Radionova	(Japan) Rin Nitaya	(Japan) Hinano Isobe	Details
(Hungary) Jégvirág Cup	(Estonia) Kristina Škuleta-Gromova	No other competitors		
(Iceland) Reykjavik International Games	(United Kingdom) Karly Robertson	(Australia) Brooklee Han	(Switzerland) Shaline Rüegger	Details
(Bulgaria) Sofia Trophy	(Brazil) Isadora Williams	(Sweden) Anita Ostlund	(Italy) Micol Cristini	Details
(Slovenia) Dragon Trophy	(Sweden) Isabelle Olsson	(Italy) Guia Maria Tagliapietra	(Austria) Lara Roth	Details
(Germany) Bavarian Open	(United States) Angela Wang	(Germany) Nathalie Weinzierl	(Germany) Lea Johanna Dastich	Details
(Japan) Asian Winter Games	(South Korea) Choi Da-bin	(China) Li Zijun	(Kazakhstan) Elizabet Tursynbaeva	Details
(Netherlands) International Challenge Cup	(Belgium) Loena Hendrickx	(United States) Caroline Zhang	(Canada) Larkyn Austman	Details
(Austria) Cup of Tyrol	(France) Laurine Lecavelier	(Italy) Micol Cristini	(Slovenia) Daša Grm	Details
(Iceland) Nordic Championships	(Italy) Carolina Kostner	(Russia) Elizaveta Tuktamysheva	(Sweden) Anita Ostlund	Details
(Luxembourg) Coupe du Printemps	(Japan) Rika Hongo	(Latvia) Angelina Kuchvalska	(Hungary) Ivett Tóth	Details
(Italy) Egna Spring Trophy	(Philippines) Alisson Krystle Perticheto	(Russia) Mariia Bessonova	(Estonia) Kristina Shkuleta-Gromova	Details
(Slovenia) Triglav Trophy	(Russia) Alina Solovyeva	(Australia) Brooklee Han	(Germany) Jennifer Schmidt	Details

=== Pairs ===
Championships
Competition	Gold	Silver	Bronze	Results
(Czech Republic) European Championships	(Russia) Evgenia Tarasova / Vladimir Morozov	(Germany) Aliona Savchenko / Bruno Massot	(France) Vanessa James / Morgan Ciprès	Details
(South Korea) Four Continents Championships	(China) Sui Wenjing / Han Cong	(Canada) Meagan Duhamel / Eric Radford	(Canada) Liubov Ilyushechkina / Dylan Moscovitch	Details
(Taiwan) World Junior Championships	(Australia) Ekaterina Alexandrovskaya / Harley Windsor	(Russia) Aleksandra Boikova / Dmitrii Kozlovskii	(China) Gao Yumeng / Xie Zhong	Details
(Finland) World Championships	(China) Sui Wenjing / Han Cong	(Germany) Aliona Savchenko / Bruno Massot	(Russia) Evgenia Tarasova / Vladimir Morozov	Details

Grand Prix
Competition	Gold	Silver	Bronze	Results
(United States) Skate America	(Canada) Julianne Séguin / Charlie Bilodeau	(United States) Haven Denney / Brandon Frazier	(Russia) Evgenia Tarasova / Vladimir Morozov	Details
Skate Canada International	(Canada) Meagan Duhamel / Eric Radford	(China) Yu Xiaoyu / Zhang Hao	(Canada) Liubov Ilyushechkina / Dylan Moscovitch	Details
(Russia) Rostelecom Cup	(Germany) Aliona Savchenko / Bruno Massot	(Russia) Natalja Zabijako / Alexander Enbert	(Russia) Kristina Astakhova / Alexei Rogonov	Details
Trophée de France	(Germany) Aliona Savchenko / Bruno Massot	(Russia) Evgenia Tarasova / Vladimir Morozov	(France) Vanessa James / Morgan Ciprès	Details
Cup of China	(China) Yu Xiaoyu / Zhang Hao	(China) Peng Cheng / Jin Yang	(Canada) Liubov Ilyushechkina / Dylan Moscovitch	Details
(Japan) NHK Trophy	(Canada) Meagan Duhamel / Eric Radford	(China) Peng Cheng / Jin Yang	(China) Wang Xuehan / Wang Lei	Details
(France) Grand Prix Final	(Russia) Evgenia Tarasova / Vladimir Morozov	(China) Yu Xiaoyu / Zhang Hao	(Canada) Meagan Duhamel / Eric Radford	Details

Junior Grand Prix
Competition	Gold	Silver	Bronze	Results
JGP Czech Republic	(Czech Republic) Anna Dušková / Martin Bidař	(Russia) Amina Atakhanova / Ilia Spiridonov	(United States) Chelsea Liu / Brian Johnson	Details
JGP Russia	(Russia) Anastasia Mishina / Vladislav Mirzoev	(Russia) Aleksandra Boikova / Dmitrii Kozlovskii	(Russia) Ekaterina Borisova / Dmitry Sopot	Details
JGP Estonia	(Australia) Ekaterina Alexandrovskaya / Harley Windsor	(Russia) Alina Ustimkina / Nikita Volodin	(Russia) Ekaterina Borisova / Dmitry Sopot	Details
JGP Germany	(Russia) Anastasia Mishina / Vladislav Mirzoev	(Czech Republic) Anna Dušková / Martin Bidař	(Russia) Alina Ustimkina / Nikita Volodin	Details
(France) JGP Final	(Russia) Anastasia Mishina / Vladislav Mirzoev	(Czech Republic) Anna Dušková / Martin Bidař	(Russia) Aleksandra Boikova / Dmitrii Kozlovskii	Details

Challenger Series
Competition	Gold	Silver	Bronze	Results
(Italy) Lombardia Trophy	(Italy) Nicole Della Monica / Matteo Guarise	(Italy) Valentina Marchei / Ondřej Hotárek	(Italy) Rebecca Ghilardi / Filippo Ambrosini	Details
(United States) U.S. International Classic	(Canada) Brittany Jones / Joshua Reagan	(United States) Jessica Calalang / Zack Sidhu	(United States) Alexandria Shaughnessy / James Morgan	Details
(Germany) Nebelhorn Trophy	(Germany) Aliona Savchenko / Bruno Massot	(Canada) Liubov Ilyushechkina / Dylan Moscovitch	(Germany) Mari Vartmann / Ruben Blommaert	Details
(Canada) Autumn Classic International	(Canada) Julianne Séguin / Charlie Bilodeau	(France) Vanessa James / Morgan Ciprès	(United States) Marissa Castelli / Mervin Tran	Details
(Slovakia) Ondrej Nepela Memorial	(Russia) Evgenia Tarasova / Vladimir Morozov	(Russia) Yuko Kavaguti / Alexander Smirnov	(Russia) Natalja Zabijako / Alexander Enbert	Details
(Finland) Finlandia Trophy	(Canada) Meagan Duhamel / Eric Radford	(Russia) Kristina Astakhova / Alexei Rogonov	(Germany) Mari Vartmann / Ruben Blommaert	Details
(Poland) Warsaw Cup	(Italy) Valentina Marchei / Ondřej Hotárek	(United States) Chelsea Liu / Brian Johnson	(Germany) Minerva Fabienne Hase / Nolan Seegert	Details
(Estonia) Tallinn Trophy	(Russia) Alina Ustimkina / Nikita Volodin	(Russia) Alisa Efimova / Alexander Korovin	(Lithuania) Goda Butkutė / Nikita Ermolaev	Details
(Croatia) Golden Spin of Zagreb	(Italy) Nicole Della Monica / Matteo Guarise	(Russia) Kristina Astakhova / Alexei Rogonov	(United States) Ashley Cain / Timothy Leduc	Details

Other international competitions
Competition	Gold	Silver	Bronze	Results
(Philippines) Asian Open Trophy	(North Korea) Ryom Tae-ok / Kim Ju-sik	(North Korea) Pak So-hyang / Song Nam-I	(Japan) Miu Suzaki / Ryuichi Kihara	Details
(France) Cup of Nice	(Czech Republic) Anna Dušková / Martin Bidař	(Austria) Miriam Ziegler / Severin Kiefer	(Italy) Rebecca Ghilardi / Filippo Ambrosini	Details
(Latvia) Volvo Open Cup	(Israel) Arina Cherniavskaia / Evgeni Krasnopolski	(Australia) Paris Stephens / Matthew Dodds	No other competitors	Details
(Germany) NRW Trophy	(Germany) Minerva Hase / Nolan Seegert	(France) Lola Esbrat / Andrei Novoselov	(Switzerland) Ioulia Chtchetinina / Noah Scherer	Details
(Poland) Mentor Toruń Cup	(Japan) Sumire Suto / Francis Boudreau-Audet	(South Korea) Kim Su-yeon / Kim Hyung-tae	(Lithuania) Goda Butkutė / Nikita Ermolaev	Details
(Germany) Bavarian Open	(Switzerland) Ioulia Chtchetinina / Noah Scherer	(Switzerland) Alexandra Herbrikova / Nicolas Roulet	(Hungary) Daria Beklemisheva / Mark Magyar	Details
(Japan) Asian Winter Games	(China) Yu Xiaoyu / Zhang Hao	(China) Peng Cheng / Jin Yang	(North Korea) Ryom Tae-ok / Kim Ju-sik	Details
(Netherlands) International Challenge Cup	(Hungary) Daria Beklemishcheva / Mark Magyar	(Finland) Emilia Simonen / Matthew Penasse	No other competitors	Details
(Austria) Cup of Tyrol	(Austria) Miriam Ziegler / Severin Kiefer	(Russia) Alisa Efimova / Alexander Korovin	(Germany) Minerva Hase / Nolan Seegert	Details

=== Ice dance ===
Championships
Competition	Gold	Silver	Bronze	Results
(Czech Republic) European Championships	(France) Gabriella Papadakis / Guillaume Cizeron	(Italy) Anna Cappellini / Luca Lanotte	(Russia) Ekaterina Bobrova / Dmitri Soloviev	Details
(South Korea) Four Continents Championships	(Canada) Tessa Virtue / Scott Moir	(United States) Maia Shibutani / Alex Shibutani	(United States) Madison Chock / Evan Bates	Details
(Taiwan) World Junior Championships	(United States) Rachel Parsons / Michael Parsons	(Russia) Alla Loboda / Pavel Drozd	(United States) Christina Carreira / Anthony Ponomarenko	Details
(Finland) World Championships	(Canada) Tessa Virtue / Scott Moir	(France) Gabriella Papadakis / Guillaume Cizeron	(United States) Maia Shibutani / Alex Shibutani	Details

Grand Prix
Competition	Gold	Silver	Bronze	Results
(United States) Skate America	(United States) Maia Shibutani / Alex Shibutani	(United States) Madison Hubbell / Zachary Donohue	(Russia) Ekaterina Bobrova / Dmitri Soloviev	Details
Skate Canada International	(Canada) Tessa Virtue / Scott Moir	(United States) Madison Chock / Evan Bates	(Canada) Piper Gilles / Paul Poirier	Details
(Russia) Rostelecom Cup	(Russia) Ekaterina Bobrova / Dmitri Soloviev	(United States) Madison Chock / Evan Bates	(Canada) Kaitlyn Weaver / Andrew Poje	Details
Trophée de France	(France) Gabriella Papadakis / Guillaume Cizeron	(United States) Madison Hubbell / Zachary Donohue	(Canada) Piper Gilles / Paul Poirier	Details
Cup of China	(United States) Maia Shibutani / Alex Shibutani	(Canada) Kaitlyn Weaver / Andrew Poje	(Russia) Alexandra Stepanova / Ivan Bukin	Details
(Japan) NHK Trophy	(Canada) Tessa Virtue / Scott Moir	(France) Gabriella Papadakis / Guillaume Cizeron	(Italy) Anna Cappellini / Luca Lanotte	Details
(France) Grand Prix Final	(Canada) Tessa Virtue / Scott Moir	(France) Gabriella Papadakis / Guillaume Cizeron	(United States) Maia Shibutani / Alex Shibutani	Details

Junior Grand Prix
Competition	Gold	Silver	Bronze	Results
JGP France	(France) Angélique Abachkina / Louis Thauron	(United States) Christina Carreira / Anthony Ponomarenko	(Russia) Sofia Polishchuk / Alexander Vakhnov	Details
JGP Czech Republic	(United States) Lorraine McNamara / Quinn Carpenter	(Czech Republic) Nicole Kuzmich / Alexandr Sinicyn	(Russia) Arina Ushakova / Maxim Nekrasov	Details
JGP Japan	(United States) Rachel Parsons / Michael Parsons	(Russia) Anastasia Shpilevaya / Grigory Smirnov	(France) Angélique Abachkina / Louis Thauron	Details
JGP Russia	(Russia) Alla Loboda / Pavel Drozd	(United States) Christina Carreira / Anthony Ponomarenko	(Russia) Sofia Shevchenko / Igor Eremenko	Details
JGP Slovenia	(United States) Lorraine McNamara / Quinn Carpenter	(Russia) Sofia Polishchuk / Alexander Vakhnov	(Russia) Anastasia Skoptsova / Kirill Aleshin	Details
JGP Estonia	(Russia) Alla Loboda / Pavel Drozd	(Russia) Anastasia Skoptsova / Kirill Aleshin	(United States) Chloe Lewis / Logan Bye	Details
JGP Germany	(United States) Rachel Parsons / Michael Parsons	(Russia) Anastasia Shpilevaya / Grigory Smirnov	(Russia) Arina Ushakova / Maxim Nekrasov	Details
(France) JGP Final	(United States) Rachel Parsons / Michael Parsons	(Russia) Alla Loboda / Pavel Drozd	(United States) Lorraine McNamara / Quinn Carpenter	Details

Challenger Series
Competition	Gold	Silver	Bronze	Results
(Italy) Lombardia Trophy	(Italy) Charlène Guignard / Marco Fabbri	(United Kingdom) Lilah Fear / Lewis Gibson	(Finland) Cecilia Törn / Jussiville Partanen	Details
(United States) U.S. International Classic	(United States) Madison Hubbell / Zachary Donohue	(Japan) Kana Muramoto / Chris Reed	(Canada) Alexandra Paul / Mitchell Islam	Details
(Germany) Nebelhorn Trophy	(Italy) Anna Cappellini / Luca Lanotte	(United States) Madison Chock / Evan Bates	(Canada) Piper Gilles / Paul Poirier	Details
(Canada) Autumn Classic International	(Canada) Tessa Virtue / Scott Moir	(United States) Kaitlin Hawayek / Jean-Luc Baker	(Denmark) Laurence Fournier Beaudry / Nikolaj Sørensen	Details
(Slovakia) Ondrej Nepela Memorial	(Russia) Ekaterina Bobrova / Dmitri Soloviev	(United States) Madison Chock / Evan Bates	(Russia) Tiffany Zahorski / Jonathan Guerreiro	Details
(Finland) Finlandia Trophy	(Russia) Alexandra Stepanova / Ivan Bukin	(United States) Madison Hubbell / Zachary Donohue	(Russia) Tiffany Zahorski / Jonathan Guerreiro	Details
(Poland) Warsaw Cup	(Russia) Ekaterina Bobrova / Dmitri Soloviev	(Russia) Tiffany Zahorski / Jonathan Guerreiro	(Slovakia) Lucie Myslivečková / Lukáš Csölley	Details
(Estonia) Tallinn Trophy	(Russia) Elena Ilinykh / Ruslan Zhiganshin	(Israel) Isabella Tobias / Ilia Tkachenko	(United States) Elliana Pogrebinsky / Alex Benoit	Details
(Croatia) Golden Spin of Zagreb	(Italy) Charlène Guignard / Marco Fabbri	(United States) Kaitlin Hawayek / Jean-Luc Baker	(Turkey) Alisa Agafonova / Alper Uçar	Details

Other international competitions
Competition	Gold	Silver	Bronze	Results
(United States) Lake Placid Ice Dance International	(United States) Elliana Pogrebinsky / Alex Benoit	(Spain) Olivia Smart / Adrià Díaz	(South Korea) Yura Min / Alexander Gamelin	Details
(France) Cup of Nice	(France) Marie-Jade Lauriault / Romain Le Gac	(Germany) Katharina Müller / Tim Dieck	(Ukraine) Oleksandra Nazarova / Maxim Nikitin	Details
(Germany) NRW Trophy	(Germany) Katharina Müller / Tim Dieck	(Germany) Kavita Lorenz / Joti Polizoakis	(Italy) Jasmine Tessari / Francesco Fioretti	Details
(Latvia) Volvo Open Cup	(Slovakia) Lucie Myslivečková / Lukáš Csölley	(Germany) Kavita Lorenz / Joti Polizoakis	(Azerbaijan) Varvara Ogloblina / Mikhail Zhirnov	Details
(Belarus) Ice Star	(Ukraine) Oleksandra Nazarova / Maxim Nikitin	(Turkey) Alisa Agafonova / Alper Uçar	(Russia) Sofia Evdokimova / Egor Bazin	Details
Open d'Andorra	(Spain) Olivia Smart / Adrià Díaz	(Germany) Katharina Müller / Tim Dieck	(Czech Republic) Cortney Mansour / Michal Češka	Details
(Hungary) Santa Claus Cup	(Spain) Sara Hurtado / Kirill Khalyavin	(United Kingdom) Lilah Fear / Lewis Gibson	(Switzerland) Victoria Manni / Carlo Roethlisberger	Details
(Poland) Mentor Toruń Cup	(Poland) Natalia Kaliszek / Maksym Spodyriev	(Spain) Sara Hurtado / Kirill Khalyavin	(Japan) Kana Muramoto / Chris Reed	Details
(Kazakhstan) Winter Universiade	(Ukraine) Oleksandra Nazarova / Maxim Nikitin	(Russia) Sofia Evdokimova / Egor Bazin	(Germany) Shari Koch / Christian Nüchtern	Details
(Germany) Bavarian Open	(Italy) Anna Cappellini / Luca Lanotte	(Spain) Olivia Smart / Adrià Díaz	(Germany) Kavita Lorenz / Joti Polizoakis	Details
(Japan) Asian Winter Games	(China) Wang Shiyue / Liu Xinyu	(Japan) Kana Muramoto / Chris Reed	(China) Zhao Yan / Chen Hong	Details

== Season's best scores ==
=== Men's singles ===
Top 10 season's best scores in the men's combined total
No.	Skater	Nation	Score	Event
1	Yuzuru Hanyu	Japan	321.59	2017 World Championships
2	Shoma Uno	Japan	319.31	2017 World Championships
3	Nathan Chen	United States	307.46	2017 Four Continents Championships
4	Jin Boyang	China	303.58	2017 World Championships
5	Javier Fernández	Spain	301.19	2017 World Championships
6	Patrick Chan	Canada	295.16	2017 World Championships
7	Mikhail Kolyada	Russia	279.41	2017 World Team Trophy
8	Jason Brown	United States	273.67	2017 World Team Trophy
9	Denis Ten	Kazakhstan	269.26	2016 Trophée de France
10	Adam Rippon	United States	267.53	2016 Trophée de France

|}

Top 10 season's best scores in the men's short program
No.	Skater	Nation	Score	Event
1	Javier Fernández	Spain	109.05	2017 World Championships
2	Yuzuru Hanyu	Japan	106.53	2016–17 Grand Prix Final
3	Shoma Uno	Japan	104.86	2017 World Championships
4	Nathan Chen	United States	103.12	2017 Four Continents Championships
5	Patrick Chan	Canada	102.13	2017 World Championships
6	Jin Boyang	China	98.64	2017 World Championships
7	Mikhail Kolyada	Russia	95.37	2017 World Team Trophy
8	Maxim Kovtun	Russia	94.53	2017 European Championships
9	Jason Brown	United States	94.32	2017 World Team Trophy
10	Denis Ten	Kazakhstan	90.18	2017 World Championships

|}

Top 10 season's best scores in the men's free skating
No.	Skater	Nation	Score	Event
1	Yuzuru Hanyu	Japan	223.20	2017 World Championships
2	Shoma Uno	Japan	214.45	2017 World Championships
3	Jin Boyang	China	204.94	2017 World Championships
4	Nathan Chen	United States	204.34	2017 Four Continents Championships
5	Javier Fernández	Spain	201.43	2016 Rostelecom Cup
6	Patrick Chan	Canada	196.31	2016 Cup of China
7	Mikhail Kolyada	Russia	184.04	2017 World Team Trophy
8	Jason Brown	United States	182.63	2016 Skate America
9	Adam Rippon	United States	182.28	2016 Trophée de France
10	Denis Ten	Kazakhstan	180.05	2016 Trophée de France

=== Ladies' singles ===
Top 10 season's best scores in the ladies' combined total
No.	Skater	Nation	Score	Event
1	Evgenia Medvedeva	Russia	241.31	2017 World Team Trophy
2	Satoko Miyahara	Japan	218.33	2016–17 Grand Prix Final
3	Mai Mihara	Japan	218.27	2017 World Team Trophy
4	Kaetlyn Osmond	Canada	218.13	2017 World Championships
5	Wakaba Higuchi	Japan	216.71	2017 World Team Trophy
6	Anna Pogorilaya	Russia	216.47	2016–17 Grand Prix Final
7	Gabrielle Daleman	Canada	214.15	2017 World Team Trophy
8	Carolina Kostner	Italy	210.52	2017 European Championships
9	Elena Radionova	Russia	209.29	2017 World Team Trophy
10	Alina Zagitova	Russia	208.60	2017 World Junior Championships

Top 10 season's best scores in the ladies' short program
No.	Skater	Nation	Score	Event
1	Evgenia Medvedeva	Russia	80.85	2017 World Team Trophy
2	Kaetlyn Osmond	Canada	75.98	2017 World Championships
3	Satoko Miyahara	Japan	74.64	2016–17 Grand Prix Final
4	Anna Pogorilaya	Russia	74.39	2017 European Championships
5	Mirai Nagasu	United States	73.40	2016 Autumn Classic International
6	Gabrielle Daleman	Canada	72.70	2016 Trophée de France
7	Carolina Kostner	Italy	72.40	2017 European Championships
8	Elena Radionova	Russia	72.21	2017 World Team Trophy
9	Maria Sotskova	Russia	72.17	2017 European Championships
10	Mai Mihara	Japan	72.10	2017 World Team Trophy

Top 10 season's best scores in the ladies' free skating
No.	Skater	Nation	Score	Event
1	Evgenia Medvedeva	Russia	160.46	2017 World Team Trophy
2	Mai Mihara	Japan	146.17	2017 World Team Trophy
3	Wakaba Higuchi	Japan	145.30	2017 World Team Trophy
4	Satoko Miyahara	Japan	143.69	2016–17 Grand Prix Final
5	Anna Pogorilaya	Russia	143.18	2016–17 Grand Prix Final
6	Gabrielle Daleman	Canada	142.41	2017 World Team Trophy
7	Kaetlyn Osmond	Canada	142.15	2017 World Championships
8	Carolina Kostner	Italy	138.12	2017 European Championships
9	Alina Zagitova	Russia	138.02	2017 World Junior Championships
10	Elena Radionova	Russia	137.08	2017 World Team Trophy

=== Pairs ===
Top 10 season's best scores in the pairs' combined total
No.	Team	Nation	Score	Event
1	Sui Wenjing / Han Cong	China	232.06	2017 World Championships
2	Aliona Savchenko / Bruno Massot	Germany	230.30	2017 World Championships
3	Evgenia Tarasova / Vladimir Morozov	Russia	227.58	2017 European Championships
4	Vanessa James / Morgan Ciprès	France	222.59	2017 World Team Trophy
5	Meagan Duhamel / Eric Radford	Canada	218.30	2016 Skate Canada International
6	Ksenia Stolbova / Fedor Klimov	Russia	216.51	2017 European Championships
7	Yu Xiaoyu / Zhang Hao	China	211.51	2017 World Championships
8	Julianne Séguin / Charlie Bilodeau	Canada	208.30	2016 Autumn Classic International
9	Lubov Ilyushechkina / Dylan Moscovitch	Canada	206.19	2017 World Championships
10	Peng Cheng / Jin Yang	China	204.49	2017 World Team Trophy

Top 10 season's best scores in the pairs' short program
No.	Team	Nation	Score	Event
1	Sui Wenjing / Han Cong	China	81.23	2017 World Championships
2	Evgenia Tarasova / Vladimir Morozov	Russia	80.82	2017 European Championships
3	Aliona Savchenko / Bruno Massot	Germany	79.84	2017 World Championships
4	Meagan Duhamel / Eric Radford	Canada	78.39	2016 Skate Canada International
5	Vanessa James / Morgan Ciprès	France	75.72	2017 World Team Trophy
6	Yu Xiaoyu / Zhang Hao	China	75.34	2016–17 Grand Prix Final
7	Natalia Zabiiako / Alexander Enbert	Russia	74.26	2017 World Championships
8	Ksenia Stolbova / Fedor Klimov	Russia	73.70	2017 European Championships
9	Peng Cheng / Jin Yang	China	73.33	2016 NHK Trophy
10	Lubov Ilyushechkina / Dylan Moscovitch	Canada	73.14	2017 World Championships

Top 10 season's best scores in the pairs' free skating
No.	Team	Nation	Score	Event
1	Sui Wenjing / Han Cong	China	150.83	2017 World Championships
2	Aliona Savchenko / Bruno Massot	Germany	150.46	2017 World Championships
3	Vanessa James / Morgan Ciprès	France	146.87	2017 World Team Trophy
4	Evgenia Tarasova / Vladimir Morozov	Russia	146.76	2017 European Championships
5	Ksenia Stolbova / Fedor Klimov	Russia	142.81	2017 European Championships
6	Meagan Duhamel / Eric Radford	Canada	139.91	2016 Skate Canada International
7	Julianne Séguin / Charlie Bilodeau	Canada	136.90	2016 Autumn Classic International
8	Peng Cheng / Jin Yang	China	136.48	2017 Four Continents Championships
9	Yu Xiaoyu / Zhang Hao	China	136.28	2017 World Championships
10	Lubov Ilyushechkina / Dylan Moscovitch	Canada	133.05	2017 World Championships

=== Ice dance ===
Top 10 season's best scores in the combined total (ice dance)
No.	Team	Nation	Score	Event
1	Tessa Virtue / Scott Moir	Canada	198.62	2017 World Championships
2	Gabriella Papadakis / Guillaume Cizeron	France	196.04	2017 World Championships
3	Maia Shibutani / Alex Shibutani	United States	191.85	2017 Four Continents Championships
4	Kaitlyn Weaver / Andrew Poje	Canada	190.56	2017 World Team Trophy
5	Madison Chock / Evan Bates	United States	189.01	2017 World Team Trophy
6	Ekaterina Bobrova / Dmitri Soloviev	Russia	186.68	2016 Rostelecom Cup
7	Anna Cappellini / Luca Lanotte	Italy	186.64	2017 European Championships
8	Elena Ilinykh / Ruslan Zhiganshin	Russia	185.19	2016 Tallinn Trophy
9	Piper Gilles / Paul Poirier	Canada	182.57	2016 Skate Canada International
10	Madison Hubbell / Zachary Donohue	United States	180.82	2017 Four Continents Championships

Top 10 season's best scores in the short dance
No.	Team	Nation	Score	Event
1	Tessa Virtue / Scott Moir	Canada	82.43	2017 World Championships
2	Madison Chock / Evan Bates	United States	79.05	2017 World Team Trophy
3	Gabriella Papadakis / Guillaume Cizeron	France	78.26	2016 Trophée de France
4	Maia Shibutani / Alex Shibutani	United States	77.97	2016–17 Grand Prix Final
5	Kaitlyn Weaver / Andrew Poje	Canada	76.73	2017 World Team Trophy
6	Madison Hubbell / Zachary Donohue	United States	76.53	2017 World Championships
7	Ekaterina Bobrova / Dmitri Soloviev	Russia	76.18	2017 European Championships
8	Elena Ilinykh / Ruslan Zhiganshin	Russia	76.04	2016 Tallinn Trophy
9	Anna Cappellini / Luca Lanotte	Italy	75.65	2017 European Championships
10	Piper Gilles / Paul Poirier	Canada	72.83	2017 World Championships

Top 10 season's best scores in the free dance
No.	Team	Nation	Score	Event
1	Gabriella Papadakis / Guillaume Cizeron	France	119.15	2017 World Championships
2	Tessa Virtue / Scott Moir	Canada	117.20	2017 Four Continents Championships
3	Maia Shibutani / Alex Shibutani	United States	115.26	2017 Four Continents Championships
4	Kaitlyn Weaver / Andrew Poje	Canada	113.83	2017 World Team Trophy
5	Madison Chock / Evan Bates	United States	112.03	2016 Skate Canada International
6	Ekaterina Bobrova / Dmitri Soloviev	Russia	111.76	2016 Rostelecom Cup
7	Anna Cappellini / Luca Lanotte	Italy	110.99	2017 European Championships
8	Piper Gilles / Paul Poirier	Canada	110.45	2016 Skate Canada International
9	Elena Ilinykh / Ruslan Zhiganshin	Russia	109.15	2016 Tallinn Trophy
10	Charlène Guignard / Marco Fabbri	Italy	107.84	2016 Golden Spin of Zagreb

== World standings ==
=== Men's singles ===
As of April 1, 2017

No.	Skater	Nation
1	Yuzuru Hanyu	Japan
2	Shoma Uno	Japan
3	Javier Fernandez	Spain
4	Patrick Chan	Canada
5	Jason Brown	United States
6	Adam Rippon	United States
7	Boyang Jin	China
8	Maxim Kovtun	Russia
9	Mikhail Kolyada	Russia
10	Nathan Chen	United States

=== Ladies' singles ===
As of March 31, 2017

No.	Skater	Nation
1	Evgenia Medvedeva	Russia
2	Satoko Miyahara	Japan
3	Anna Pogorilaya	Russia
4	Ashley Wagner	United States
5	Elizaveta Tuktamysheva	Russia
6	Elena Radionova	Russia
7	Mirai Nagasu	United States
8	Kaetlyn Osmond	Canada
9	Rika Hongo	Japan
10	Gracie Gold	United States

=== Pairs ===
As of March 30, 2017

No.	Team	Nation
1	Meagan Duhamel / Eric Radford	Canada
2	Evgenia Tarasova / Vladimir Morozov	Russia
3	Ksenia Stolbova / Fedor Klimov	Russia
4	Aljona Savchenko / Bruno Massot	Germany
5	Wenjing Sui / Cong Han	China
6	Vanessa James / Morgan Cipres	France
7	Alexa Scimeca Knierim / Chris Knierim	United States
8	Julianne Séguin / Charlie Bilodeau	Canada
9	Yuko Kavaguti / Alexander Smirnov	Russia
10	Liubov Ilyushechkina / Dylan Moscovitch	Canada

=== Ice dance ===
As of April 1, 2017

No.	Team	Nation
1	Madison Chock / Evan Bates	United States
2	Maia Shibutani / Alex Shibutani	United States
3	Gabriella Papadakis / Guillaume Cizeron	France
4	Kaitlyn Weaver / Andrew Poje	Canada
5	Madison Hubbell / Zachary Donohue	United States
6	Anna Cappellini / Luca Lanotte	Italy
7	Ekaterina Bobrova / Dmitri Soloviev	Russia
8	Charlene Guignard / Marco Fabbri	Italy
9	Piper Gilles / Paul Poirier	Canada
10	Alexandra Stepanova / Ivan Bukin	Russia

== Current season's world rankings ==
=== Men's singles ===
As of April 1, 2017

No.	Skater	Nation
1	Yuzuru Hanyu	Japan
2	Shoma Uno	Japan
3	Nathan Chen	United States
4	Patrick Chan	Canada
5	Javier Fernandez	Spain
6	Jason Brown	United States
7	Alexei Bychenko	Israel
8	Boyang Jin	China
9	Mikhail Kolyada	Russia
10	Maxim Kovtun	Russia

=== Ladies' singles ===
As of March 31, 2017

No.	Skater	Nation
1	Evgenia Medvedeva	Russia
2	Kaetlyn Osmond	Canada
3	Anna Pogorilaya	Russia
4	Gabrielle Daleman	Canada
5	Maria Sotskova	Russia
6	Mai Mihara	Japan
7	Karen Chen	United States
8	Mirai Nagasu	United States
9	Satoko Miyahara	Japan
10	Elizabet Tursynbaeva	Kazakhstan

=== Pairs ===
As of March 30, 2017

No.	Team	Nation
1	Evgenia Tarasova / Vladimir Morozov	Russia
2	Aliona Savchenko / Bruno Massot	Germany
3	Meagan Duhamel / Eric Radford	Canada
4	Xiaoyu Yu / Hao Zhang	China
5	Natalia Zabiiako / Alexander Enbert	Russia
6	Julianne Séguin / Charlie Bilodeau	Canada
7	Liubov Ilyushechkina / Dylan Moscovitch	Canada
8	Valentina Marchei / Ondrej Hotarek	Italy
9	Vanessa James / Morgan Cipres	France
10	Nicole Della Monica / Matteo Guarise	Italy

=== Ice dance ===
As of April 1, 2017

No.	Team	Nation
1	Tessa Virtue / Scott Moir	Canada
2	Ekaterina Bobrova / Dmitri Soloviev	Russia
3	Gabriella Papadakis / Guillaume Cizeron	France
4	Madison Hubbell / Zachary Donohue	United States
5	Madison Chock / Evan Bates	United States
6	Maia Shibutani / Alex Shibutani	United States
7	Anna Cappellini / Luca Lanotte	Italy
8	Charlene Guignard / Marco Fabbri	Italy
9	Isabella Tobias / Ilia Tkachenko	Israel
10	Kaitlyn Weaver / Andrew Poje	Canada
