= Márk Magyar =

Hungarian figure skater

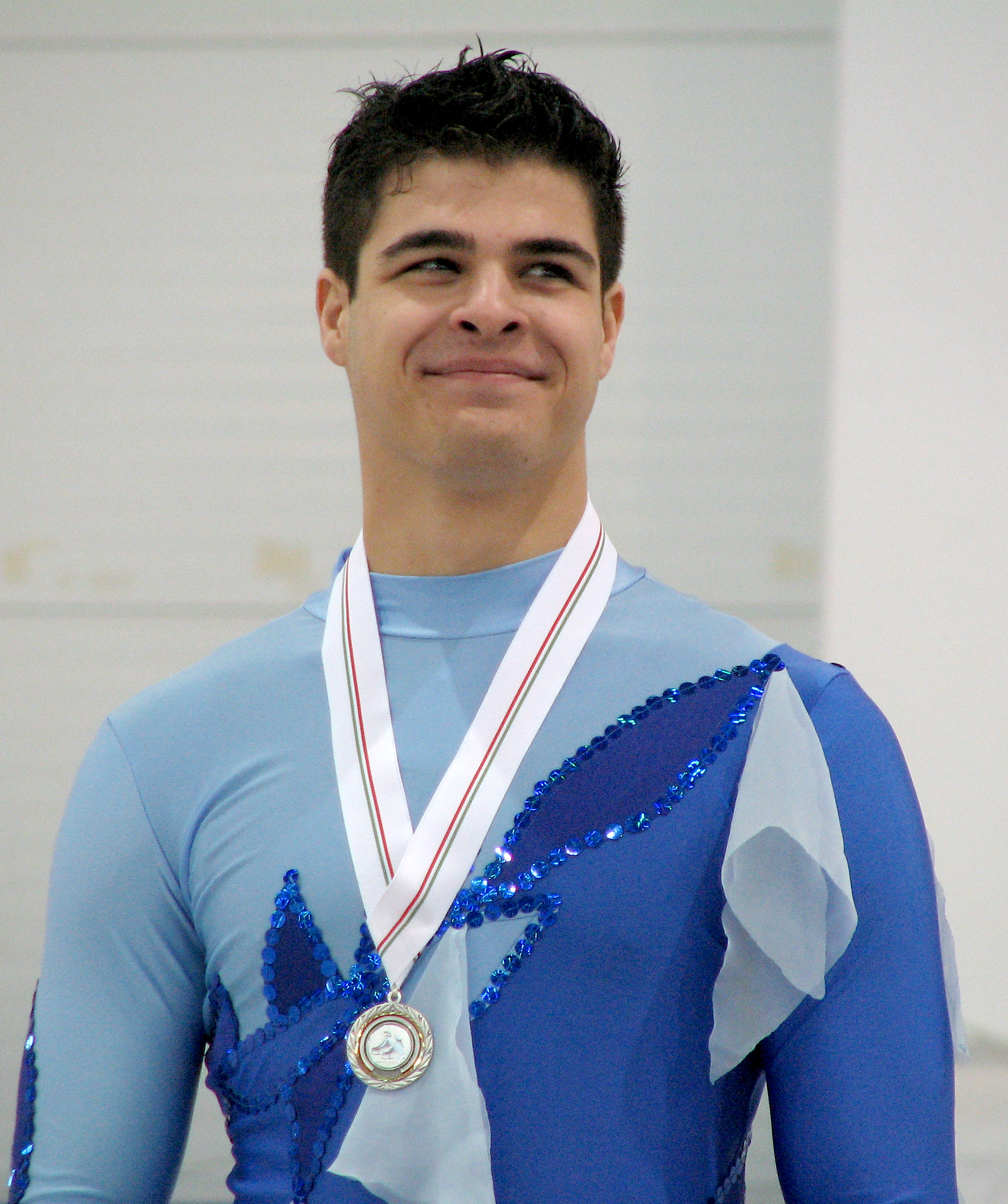
- Magyar in 2008

Personal information
- Born: 28 April 1990 (age 36) Budapest, Hungary
- Height: 1.85 m (6 ft 1 in)

Figure skating career
- Country: Hungary
- Coach: Dmitri Savin
- Skating club: UTE Budapest
- Began skating: 1998
- Retired: March 2022

Medal record
Hungarian Championships
Gold medal – first place	2016 Trinec	Pairs
Gold medal – first place	2020 Ostrava	Pairs
Gold medal – first place	2021 Budapest	Pairs
Gold medal – first place	2022 Spišská Nová Ves	Pairs

Márk Magyar (born 28 April 1990) is a former Hungarian pair skater. With Ioulia Chtchetinina, he is a three-time Hungarian national champion (2020–22). With his former skating partner, Darja Beklemiscseva, he won bronze at the 2017 Bavarian Open and competed at the 2017 World Championships. Earlier in his career, he skated with Anna Khnychenkova and Anna Marie Pearce, competing in the final segment at three ISU Championships.

== Career ==
=== Early years ===
Magyar began learning to skate in 1998. Competing in men's singles, he placed second to Tigran Vardanjan at the 2008 Hungarian Championships.

=== Partnership with Khnychenkova ===
In 2009, Magyar teamed up with Ukraine's Anna Khnychenkova to compete in pair skating for Hungary. In the 2009–2010 season, the pair trained under Viacheslav Tkachenko in Budapest. They placed 15th at their first international event – the World Junior Championships, held in March 2010 in The Hague, Netherlands.

In the 2010–2011 season, Khnychenkova/Magyar trained in Toruń, Poland, and Budapest, Hungary, coached by Dorota Siudek and Mariusz Siudek. They placed 7th at a senior Grand Prix event, the Trophée Éric Bompard in November 2010. In March 2011, they finished 13th at the World Junior Championships in Gangneung, South Korea; it was their final competition as a pair.

=== Partnership with Foucher ===
Magyar had a brief partnership with France's Camille Foucher. The pair skated for Hungary at two international events in February 2013; they placed 6th at the Bavarian Open and 7th at the International Challenge Cup.

=== Partnership with Pearce ===
In 2015, Magyar decided to compete for Hungary with Anna Marie Pearce from the United States. The pair's international debut came in October 2015; they placed 7th at the CS Ondrej Nepela Trophy and then 6th at the International Cup of Nice. In January 2016, they placed 14th at the European Championships in Bratislava, Slovakia.

Pearce/Magyar were coached by Stefania Berton and Rockne Brubaker in Geneva, Illinois.

=== Partnership with Beklemiscseva ===
In 2016, Magyar and Russia's Darja Beklemiscseva decided to compete together for Hungary. Making their international debut, they won the bronze medal at the Bavarian Open in February 2017. In March, they placed 24th in the short program at the 2017 World Championships in Helsinki, Finland. Trudy Oltmanns coached the pair in Shakopee, Minnesota until the end of the season.

For the 2017–2018 season, Beklemiscseva/Magyar decided to train with Robin Szolkowy, Maylin Wende, and Daniel Wende in Oberstdorf, Germany, and Zürich, Switzerland. The pair placed 8th at the 2017 CS Lombardia Trophy and 16th at the 2017 CS Nebelhorn Trophy.

=== Partnership with Kashitsyna ===
In 2017 Magyar teamed up with Elizaveta Kashitsyna from Russia. In their one-season together they placed twenty-eighth at the 2018 World Championships.

=== Partnership with Chtchetinina ===
Magyar formed a new partnership with Ioulia Chtchetinina, a Russian who had previously competed for Switzerland, in the 2019–20 season. Chtchetinina/Magyar debuted on the Challenger series with an eighth-place finish at the 2019 CS Finlandia Trophy before coming fifth at the 2019 CS Golden Spin of Zagreb and winning the Hungarian national title. They were tenth in their European Championship debut, and were scheduled to make their World Championship debut in Montreal before the championships were cancelled due to the COVID-19 pandemic.

In the pandemic-affected 2020–21 season, Chtchetinina/Magyar made their Grand Prix debut at the 2020 Rostelecom Cup, finishing in seventh. Hungarian champions again, they went on to win a bronze medal at the International Challenge Cup before finishing fourteenth at the 2021 World Championships in Stockholm. This result qualified a berth for Hungary at the 2022 Winter Olympics in Beijing.

Beginning the Olympic season on the Challenger series, Chtchetinina/Magyar were eighth at the 2021 CS Denis Ten Memorial Challenge before winning a bronze medal at the Budapest Trophy. Assigned to two Grand Prix events, they finished sixth at both the 2021 Internationaux de France and the 2021 Rostelecom Cup. After a third consecutive Hungarian national title, they were sixth at the 2022 European Championships. Chtchetinina/Magyar were named to the Hungarian Olympic team. Unfortunately, days before the beginning of the Olympic pairs event, Magyar tested positive for COVID-19, and as a result, the team had to withdraw. Magyar lamented that "the work of a lifetime is gone." Shortly after, Magyar announced his retirement from figure skating.

== Programs ==
=== With Chtchetinina ===
Season	Short program	Free skating
2021–2022	Can't Pretend by Tom Odell choreo. by Dmitri Savin	Dust in the Wind by Kansas choreo. by Dmitri Savin
2020–2021	Renaissance (from Medici: Masters of Florence) by Paolo Buonvino & Skin choreo. by Dmitri Savin	Need you tonight; Legendary by Welshly Arms choreo. by Olga Orlova
2019–2020	Prodigy by Nathan Lanier choreo. by Nóra Hoffmann	Need you tonight; Legendary by Welshly Arms choreo. by Olga Orlova

=== With Kashitsyna ===
Season	Short program	Free skating
2017–2018	The Deer by Woodkid	Farewell performed by Apocalyptica; Nothing Else Matters by Metallica performed by Apocalyptica

=== With Beklemiscseva ===
Season	Short program	Free skating
2017–2018	The Deer by Woodkid	Dreamgirls; Listen; One Night Only
2016–2017	Beneath Your Beautiful by Labrinth, Emeli Sandé	Time to Say Goodbye performed by Andrea Bocelli, Sarah Brightman

=== With Pearce ===
Season	Short program	Free skating
2015–2016	Nyah (from Mission: Impossible 2) by Hans Zimmer	My Way; Fly Me to the Moon performed by Frank Sinatra

=== With Khnychenkova ===
Season	Short program	Free skating
2010–2011	Classica by Alfred Schnittke	Don Juan (soundtrack)
2009–2010	Tango de los Exilados by Walter Taieb, Vanessa-Mae	Tosca by Giacomo Puccini; Art on Ice by Edvin Marton

== Competitive highlights ==
=== Pair skating with Ioulia Chtchetinina ===
Competition placements at senior level
Season	2019–20	2020–21	2021–22
World Championships	C	14th	
European Championships	10th		6th
Hungarian Championships	1st	1st	1st
Four Nationals Championships	1st		1st
GP France			6th
GP Rostelecom Cup		7th	6th
CS Finlandia Trophy	8th		
CS Golden Spin of Zagreb	5th		
Budapest Trophy			3rd
Challenge Cup	4th	3rd	
Denis Ten Memorial			8th
IceLab Cup	4th		

=== With Kashitsyna ===
International
Event	17–18
World Championships	28th
International Challenge Cup	6th

=== With Beklemiscseva ===
International
Event	16–17	17–18
World Championships	24th	
CS Lombardia Trophy		8th
CS Nebelhorn Trophy		16th
Bavarian Open	3rd	
International Challenge Cup	1st	

=== With Pearce ===
International
Event	15–16
European Championships	14th
CS Ondrej Nepela Trophy	7th
CS International Cup of Nice	6th
National
Hungarian Championships	1st

=== With Foucher ===
International
Event	12–13
Bavarian Open	6th
International Challenge Cup	7th

=== With Khnychenkova ===
International
Event	09–10	10–11
GP Trophée Bompard		7th
International: Junior
World Junior Championships	15th	13th
JGP Austria		15th
National
Hungarian Championships	1st J	
