= Anna Khnychenkova =

Ukrainian figure skater

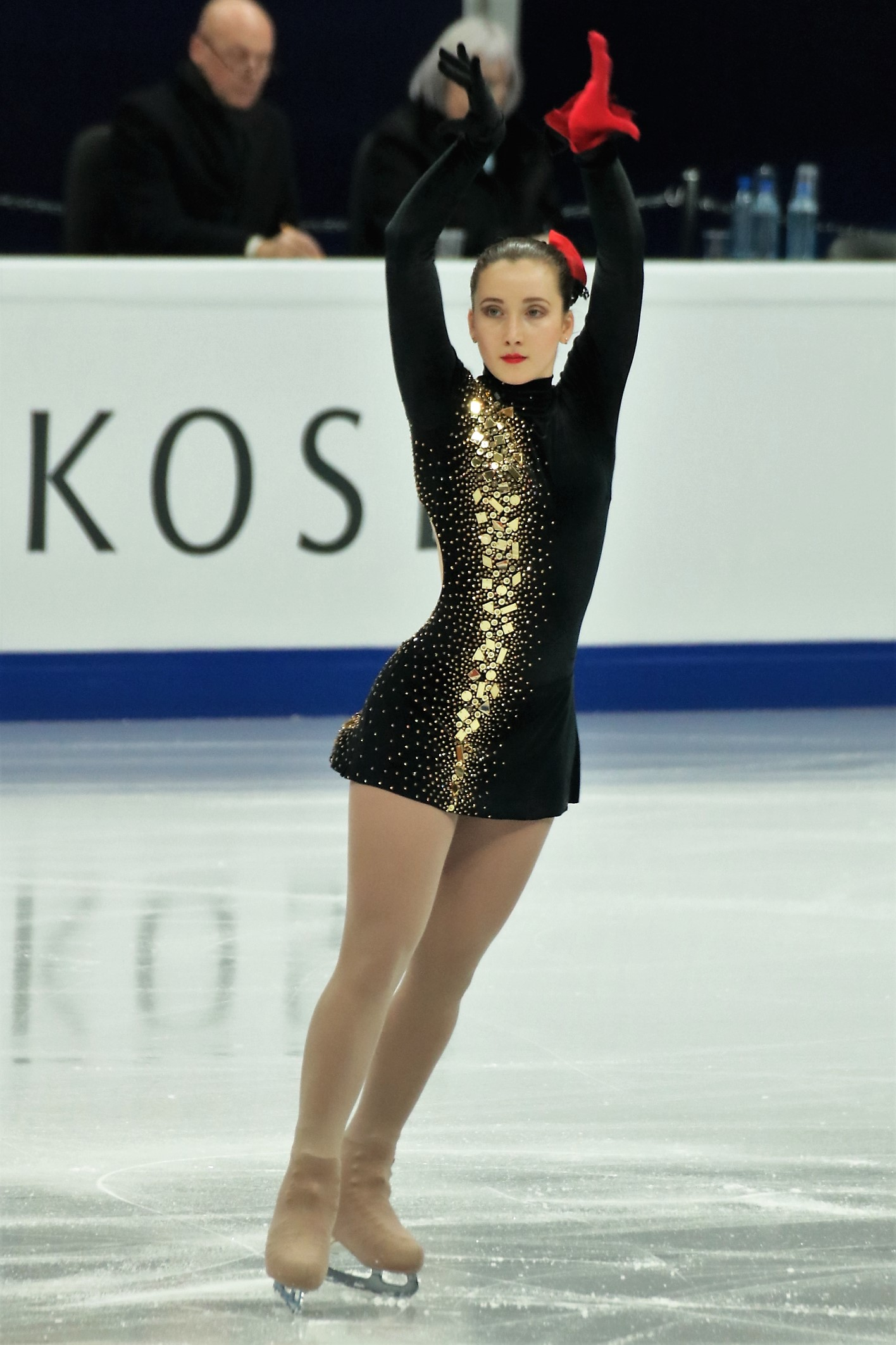
- Khnychenkova at the 2018 European Figure Skating Championships

Personal information
- Native name: Анна Юріївна Хниченкова
- Born: 12 November 1994 (age 31) Dnipro, Ukraine
- Height: 1.58 m (5 ft 2 in)

Figure skating career
- Country: Ukraine
- Coach: Viacheslav Tkachenko
- Skating club: MDUSSH "Ukraine"
- Began skating: 1999

Anna Yuriivna Khnychenkova (Ukrainian: Анна Юріївна Хниченкова, born 12 November 1994) is a Ukrainian figure skater. As a single skater, she is the 2016 Ice Star champion, 2017 International Cup of Nice bronze medalist, and 2017 Ukrainian national champion. She has competed in the free skate at five ISU Championships and qualified a spot for Ukraine at the 2018 Winter Olympics.

Earlier in her career, Khnychenkova competed in pair skating for Ukraine and Hungary.

== Pair skating ==
=== Partnership with Kulbach ===
From 2008 to 2009, Khnychenkova competed in pair skating with Sergei Kulbach for Ukraine. Coached by Viacheslav Tkachenko in Dnipro, they finished 20th at the 2009 World Junior Championships.

=== Partnership with Magyar ===
In 2009, Khnychenkova and Márk Magyar decided to compete together for Hungary. In the 2009–2010 season, the pair trained under Viacheslav Tkachenko in Budapest. They placed 15th at their first international event – the World Junior Championships, held in March 2010 in The Hague, Netherlands.

In the 2010–2011 season, Khnychenkova/Magyar trained in Toruń, Poland, and Budapest, Hungary, coached by Dorota Siudek and Mariusz Siudek. They placed 7th at a senior Grand Prix event, the Trophée Éric Bompard in November 2010. In March 2011, they finished 13th at the World Junior Championships in Gangneung, South Korea; it was their final competition as a pair.

== Single skating ==
=== Early career ===
Knychenkova began learning to skate in 1999. After a period abroad, she returned to Ukraine in 2011 and rejoined Viacheslav Tkachenko in Dnipro. In December 2011, she finished 5th competing in senior ladies' singles at the Ukrainian Championships. In October 2012, she won the junior silver medal at the Tirnavia Ice Cup, her first international competition as a single skater for Ukraine. Her senior international debut came in December at the 2012 NRW Trophy.

Khnychenkova placed 17th at the 2013 World Junior Championships in Milan. In 2014, she was assigned to her second World Junior Championships. She finished 17th at the event, held in Sofia, Bulgaria.

=== 2015–2016 season ===
Knychenkova placed 4th at the 2015 International Cup of Nice. She had a knee sprain and some boot issues in the first half of the season. Although second at the Ukrainian Championships, she was selected to compete at two senior ISU Championships because the champion, Anastasia Hozhva, was not yet age-eligible to compete internationally on the senior level. In January, Khnychenkova qualified to the final segment at the 2016 European Championships in Bratislava (Slovakia) by placing 19th in the short; she was 22nd in the free and finished 21st overall. In March, she reached the free skate at the 2016 World Championships in Boston and finished 19th overall.

=== 2016–2017 season ===
Khnychenkova won gold at Ice Star, held in Belarus in November 2016. In December, she won the Ukrainian national title by a margin of 17 points over Hozhva. At the 2017 European Championships in Ostrava (Czech Republic), she advanced to the free skate and finished 21st overall.

Ranked 35th in the short program, she did not reach the final segment at the 2017 World Championships in Helsinki, Finland.

=== 2017–2018 season ===
Khnychenkova began her season in early September, finishing 6th at the Slovenia Open. At the end of the month, she competed at the 2017 CS Nebelhorn Trophy, the final qualifying opportunity for the 2018 Winter Olympics. Ranked 4th in the short program and 8th in the free skate, she finished 7th overall and earned a spot for Ukraine at the Olympics. In October, she won the bronze medal at the International Cup of Nice.

== Programs ==
=== Single skating ===
Season	Short program	Free skating
2017–2018	Sorongo; Street Passions by Didulia	California Dreamin' performed by Sia
2016–2017	The Godfather by Nino Rota; Mambo Italiano	California Dreamin' performed by Scala & Kolacny Brothers
2015–2016	The Godfather by Nino Rota; Mambo Italiano	Exogenesis: Symphony Part 3 (Redemption) by Muse
2013–2014	Tsyganotchka (Russian gypsy music)	Instinct Rhapsody; Eternally; Instinct Rhapsody by Ikuko Kawai
2012–2013	Theme de Belle et Sebastian (from L'Oiseau) by André Rieu	Overture from Don Juan by Felix Gray

=== With Magyar ===
Season	Short program	Free skating
2010–2011	Classica by Alfred Schnittke	Don Juan (soundtrack)
2009–2010	Tango de los Exilados by Walter Taieb, Vanessa-Mae	Tosca by Giacomo Puccini; Art on Ice by Edvin Marton

=== With Kulbach ===
Season	Short program	Free skating
2008–2009	Emir Kusturica film soundtracks	Ukrainian folk music

== Competitive highlights ==
GP: Grand Prix; CS: Challenger Series; JGP: Junior Grand Prix

=== Single skating for Ukraine ===
International
Event	11–12	12–13	13–14	14–15	15–16	16–17	17–18
Olympics							29th
Worlds					19th	35th	
Europeans					21st	21st	23rd
CS Golden Spin				15th			
CS Ice Star							6th
CS Nebelhorn							7th
CS Ondrej Nepela				12th		17th	
CS Tallinn Trophy							8th
Cup of Nice					4th	11th	3rd
Ice Star						1st	
NRW Trophy		28th					
Slovenia Open							6th
Ukrainian Open			8th				
Universiade			9th	9th			
International: Junior
Junior Worlds		17th	17th				
JGP Estonia			21st				
JGP Slovakia			13th				
Tirnavia Ice Cup		2nd					
Volvo Open Cup		2nd					
National
Ukraine	5th	3rd	3rd	2nd	2nd	1st	2nd
Ukraine: Junior		1st					

=== Pair skating with Magyar for Hungary ===
International
Event	2009–10	2010–11
GP Trophée Bompard		7th
International: Junior
World Junior Championships	15th	13th
JGP Austria		15th
National
Hungarian Championships	1st J	
J = Junior level

=== Pair skating with Kulbach for Ukraine ===
International
Event	2008–09
World Junior Championships	20th
JGP Czech Republic	14th
JGP United Kingdom	17th
National
Ukrainian Championships	2nd
