= 2017 CS Lombardia Trophy =

- Type: ISU Challenger Series
- Date: 14 – 17 September 2017
- Season: 2017–18
- Location: Bergamo, Italy
- Venue: Ice Lab arena

Champions
- Men's singles: (Japan) Shoma Uno
- Ladies' singles: (Russia) Alina Zagitova
- Pairs: (Russia) Natalia Zabiiako / Alexander Enbert
- Ice dance: (Italy) Charlène Guignard / Marco Fabbri
- Previous: 2017 CS U.S. Classic
- Next: 2017 CS Autumn Classic; 2017 CS Ondrej Nepela Trophy

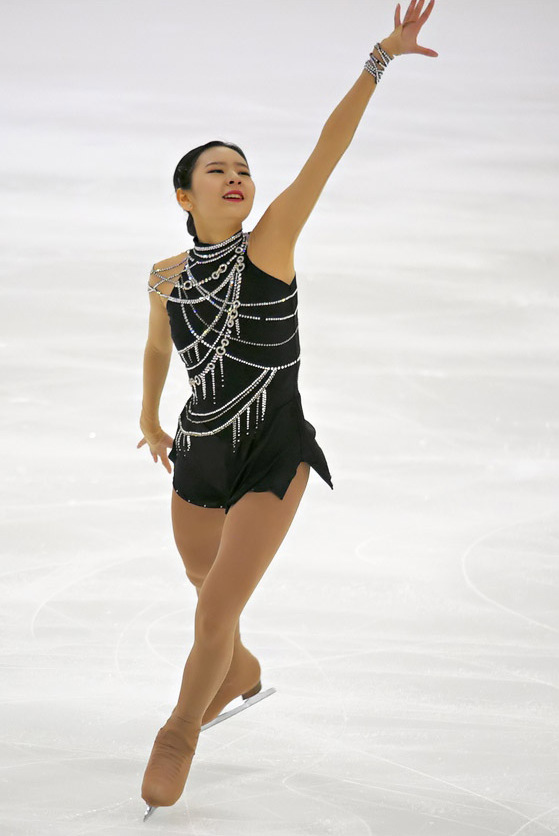
Kim Na-hyun performs her short program at the 2017 Lombardia Trophy

The 2017 CS Lombardia Trophy was a senior international figure skating competition held in September 2017 in Bergamo, Italy. It was part of the 2017–18 ISU Challenger Series. Medals were awarded in the disciplines of men's singles, ladies' singles, pair skating, and ice dance.

== Entries ==
Each country was allowed to enter up to three entries per discipline. The International Skating Union published the entry lists on 22 August 2017:

Country	Men	Ladies	Pairs	Ice dance
Armenia		Anastasia Galustyan		
Australia	Brendan Kerry; James Min	Kailani Craine		
Austria		Natalie Klotz; Lara Roth; Marika Steward	Miriam Ziegler / Severin Kiefer	
Czech Republic		Michaela Lucie Hanzlíková; Elizaveta Ukolova	Anna Dušková / Martin Bidař	
Estonia	Samuel Koppel; Aleksandr Selevko; Daniil Zurav	Gerli Liinamäe; Kristina Škuleta-Gromova; Annely Vahi		Viktoria Semenjuk / Artur Gruzdev
Finland	Valtter Virtanen	Emmi Peltonen		Cecilia Törn / Jussiville Partanen; Juulia Turkkila / Matthias Versluis
France	Landry Le May; Adrien Tesson	Julie Froetscher; Laurine Lecavelier; Sandra Ramond		Adelina Galayavieva / Laurent Abecassis
Germany		Lea Johanna Dastich		
Hungary		Fruzsina Medgyesi	Daria Beklemisheva / Mark Magyar	
Italy	Ivan Righini; Matteo Rizzo; Maurizio Zandron	Micol Cristini; Carolina Kostner; Roberta Rodeghiero	Nicole Della Monica / Matteo Guarise; Rebecca Ghilardi / Filippo Ambrosini; Valentina Marchei / Ondřej Hotárek	Anna Cappellini / Luca Lanotte; Charlène Guignard / Marco Fabbri; Jasmine Tessari / Francesco Fioretti
Japan	Hiroaki Sato; Shoma Uno	Wakaba Higuchi; Yura Matsuda		Rikako Fukase / Aru Tateno; Misato Komatsubara / Timothy Koleto
Kazakhstan	Abzal Rakimgaliev			
Latvia	Deniss Vasiļjevs			Aurelija Ipolito / Malcolm Jones; Olga Jakushina / Andrey Nevskiy
Liechtenstein		Romana Kaiser		
Lithuania		Aleksandra Golovkina; Elžbieta Kropa; Greta Morkytė		
Norway	Sondre Oddvoll Bøe	Anne Line Gjersem		
Philippines		Alisson Perticheto		
South Korea		Jeon Gyo-hee; Kim Na-hyun		
Russia	Andrei Lazukin; Alexander Petrov	Elizaveta Tuktamysheva; Alina Zagitova	Alisa Efimova / Alexander Korovin; Natalia Zabiiako / Alexander Enbert	Alla Loboda / Pavel Drozd
Serbia		Antonina Dubinina		
South Africa	Matthew Samuels			
Spain			Laura Barquero / Aritz Maestu	
Slovakia				Lucie Myslivečková / Lukáš Csölley
Sweden	Alexander Majorov	Matilda Algotsson; Joshi Helgesson		
Switzerland	Tim Huber; Stephane Walker	Yoonmi Lehmann; Tanja Odermatt; Yasmine Kimiko Yamada		Victoria Manni / Carlo Röthlisberger
Ukraine				Oleksandra Nazarova / Maxim Nikitin
United Kingdom	Graham Newberry	Nina Povey; Kristen Spours		Lilah Fear / Lewis Gibson
United States	Jason Brown; Jordan Moeller	Amber Glenn; Bradie Tennell	Ashley Cain-Gribble / Timothy LeDuc	Elliana Pogrebinsky / Alex Benoit

Withdrew before starting orders were drawn

- Men: Daniel Albert Naurits (EST), Denis Ten (KAZ)
- Ladies: Helery Hälvin (EST)
- Pairs: Alexandra Herbríková / Nicolas Roulet (SUI)
- Ice dance: Sara Hurtado / Kirill Khaliavin (ESP)

Added

- Men: Brendan Kerry (AUS), Samuel Koppel (EST)
- Ladies: Annely Vahi (EST)

== Senior results ==
=== Men ===
Rank	Name	Nation	Total	SP		FS	
1	Shoma Uno	Japan	319.84	1	104.87	1	214.97
2	Jason Brown	United States	259.88	2	83.01	2	176.87
3	Brendan Kerry	Australia	233.05	3	82.30	5	150.75
4	Deniss Vasiļjevs	Latvia	228.91	5	76.17	4	152.74
5	Matteo Rizzo	Italy	227.02	6	71.67	3	155.35
6	Alexander Majorov	Sweden	218.78	4	80.85	7	137.93
7	Alexander Petrov	Russia	208.65	8	68.79	6	139.86
8	Andrei Lazukin	Russia	199.42	9	67.92	8	131.50
9	Stephane Walker	Switzerland	194.49	11	63.63	9	130.86
10	Jordan Moeller	United States	191.73	7	70.75	13	120.98
11	Ivan Righini	Italy	188.40	13	61.64	11	126.76
12	Hiroaki Sato	Japan	184.78	17	57.94	10	126.84
13	Maurizio Zandron	Italy	184.17	14	60.51	12	123.66
14	Sondre Oddvoll Bøe	Norway	180.23	12	63.37	14	116.86
15	Graham Newberry	United Kingdom	179.00	10	65.98	15	113.02
16	Aleksandr Selevko	Estonia	167.58	16	57.96	16	109.62
17	Valtter Virtanen	Finland	164.51	18	57.08	17	107.43
18	James Min	Australia	160.97	15	58.45	19	102.52
19	Samuel Koppel	Estonia	157.23	19	57.07	20	100.16
20	Adrien Tesson	France	152.81	22	47.22	18	105.59
21	Daniil Zurav	Estonia	145.11	21	48.32	21	96.79
22	Landry Le May	France	142.87	20	56.41	22	86.46
23	Tim Huber	Switzerland	120.70	23	40.50	23	80.20

=== Ladies ===
Rank	Name	Nation	Total	SP		FS	
1	Alina Zagitova	Russia	218.46	3	71.29	1	147.17
2	Wakaba Higuchi	Japan	217.63	1	74.26	2	143.37
3	Carolina Kostner	Italy	198.36	2	71.67	5	126.69
4	Bradie Tennell	United States	196.70	5	64.34	3	132.36
5	Yura Matsuda	Japan	195.56	4	65.62	4	129.94
6	Elizaveta Tuktamysheva	Russia	184.75	6	58.91	6	125.84
7	Lea Johanna Dastich	Germany	150.38	11	53.33	8	97.05
8	Amber Glenn	United States	149.96	8	57.44	11	92.52
9	Matilda Algotsson	Sweden	149.88	12	52.59	7	97.29
10	Laurine Lecavelier	France	149.02	10	53.97	9	95.05
11	Emmi Peltonen	Finland	138.21	18	46.09	13	92.12
12	Fruzsina Medgyesi	Hungary	137.26	22	43.67	10	93.59
13	Micol Cristini	Italy	137.21	7	58.03	22	79.18
14	Joshi Helgesson	Sweden	133.54	9	54.15	21	79.39
15	Kristina Škuleta-Gromova	Estonia	133.30	27	40.78	12	92.52
16	Anne Line Gjersem	Norway	131.92	13	52.23	19	79.69
17	Yasmine Kimiko Yamada	Switzerland	131.37	15	49.76	17	81.61
18	Kristen Spours	United Kingdom	130.63	25	42.39	15	88.24
19	Anastasia Galustyan	Armenia	130.36	16	49.05	18	81.31
20	Jeon Gyo-hee	South Korea	129.91	24	42.49	16	87.42
21	Annely Vahi	Estonia	124.95	30	36.46	14	88.49
22	Michaela Lucie Hanzlíková	Czech Republic	120.41	14	50.89	30	69.52
23	Alisson Perticheto	Philippines	120.12	23	43.55	24	76.57
24	Gerli Liinamäe	Estonia	119.10	29	39.51	20	79.59
25	Kim Na-hyun	South Korea	118.86	19	44.38	27	74.48
26	Tanja Odermatt	Switzerland	118.41	26	42.11	25	76.30
27	Nina Povey	United Kingdom	117.41	21	43.87	28	73.54
28	Yoonmi Lehmann	Switzerland	117.19	20	43.96	29	73.23
29	Aleksandra Golovkina	Lithuania	114.03	17	46.49	31	67.54
30	Antonina Dubinina	Serbia	112.19	32	35.12	23	77.07
31	Elizaveta Ukolova	Czech Republic	111.65	31	35.79	26	75.86
32	Sandra Ramond	France	101.13	28	40.21	33	60.92
33	Greta Morkytė	Lithuania	97.08	33	34.61	32	62.47
34	Romana Kaiser	Liechtenstein	88.51	34	33.58	34	54.93

=== Pairs ===
Rank	Name	Nation	Total	SP		FS	
1	Natalia Zabiiako / Alexander Enbert	Russia	196.06	1	69.22	1	126.84
2	Nicole Della Monica / Matteo Guarise	Italy	191.39	2	66.66	2	124.73
3	Valentina Marchei / Ondřej Hotárek	Italy	180.86	3	61.32	3	119.54
4	Ashley Cain-Gribble / Timothy LeDuc	United States	166.32	4	60.56	5	105.76
5	Alisa Efimova / Alexander Korovin	Russia	160.70	5	56.54	6	104.16
6	Miriam Ziegler / Severin Kiefer	Austria	155.90	6	49.80	4	106.10
7	Laura Barquero / Aritz Maestu	Spain	140.24	7	49.44	7	90.80
8	Daria Beklemisheva / Mark Magyar	Hungary	113.00	9	41.28	8	71.72
WD	Rebecca Ghilardi / Filippo Ambrosini	Italy	43.34	8	43.34		

=== Ice dance ===
Rank	Name	Nation	Total	SD		FD	
1	Charlène Guignard / Marco Fabbri	Italy	169.30	1	70.26	1	99.04
2	Alla Loboda / Pavel Drozd	Russia	154.40	2	63.34	2	91.06
3	Oleksandra Nazarova / Maxim Nikitin	Ukraine	150.88	4	61.06	3	89.82
4	Elliana Pogrebinsky / Alex Benoit	United States	150.42	3	61.36	4	89.06
5	Cecilia Törn / Jussiville Partanen	Finland	132.92	8	50.70	5	82.22
6	Jasmine Tessari / Francesco Fioretti	Italy	132.76	5	55.54	7	77.22
7	Lucie Myslivečková / Lukáš Csölley	Slovakia	129.06	7	52.74	8	76.32
8	Misato Komatsubara / Timothy Koleto	Japan	128.28	9	49.80	6	78.48
9	Lilah Fear / Lewis Gibson	United Kingdom	124.22	6	53.70	10	70.52
10	Juulia Turkkila / Matthias Versluis	Finland	120.44	10	49.14	9	71.30
11	Rikako Fukase / Aru Tateno	Japan	117.30	11	47.80	11	69.50
12	Adelina Galayavieva / Laurent Abecassis	France	104.54	12	42.64	12	61.90
13	Viktoria Semenjuk / Artur Gruzdev	Estonia	100.36	13	38.84	13	61.52
