= Daria Beklemisheva =

Russian figure skater

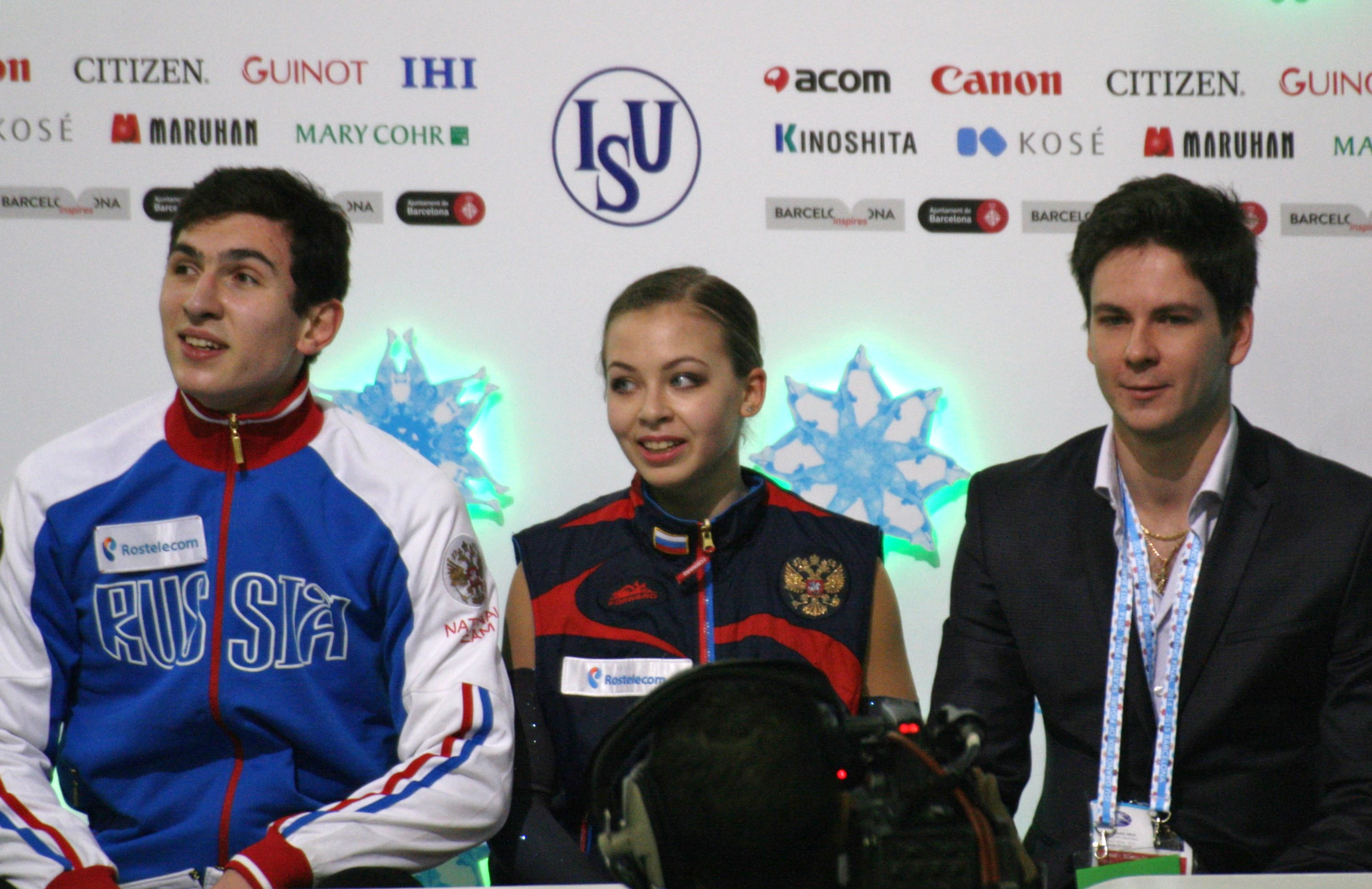
- Beklemiscseva in December 2014

Personal information
- Native name: Дарья Дмитриевна Беклемищева (Russian)
- Full name: Daria Dmitrievna Beklemisheva
- Other names: Darja Beklemiscseva; Daria Beklemishcheva
- Born: 27 June 1997 (age 29) Lipetsk, Russia
- Height: 1.58 m (5 ft 2 in)

Figure skating career
- Country: Hungary
- Skating club: UTE Budapest
- Began skating: 2002

Daria Dmitrievna Beklemisheva (Russian: Дарья Дмитриевна Беклемищева; Hungarian: Darja Beklemiscseva; born 27 June 1997) is a Russian-Hungarian former competitive pair skater. Skating with Márk Magyar for Hungary, she won bronze at the 2017 Bavarian Open and competed at the 2017 World Championships.

== Personal life ==
Beklemisheva was born on 27 June 1997 in Lipetsk, Russia. She became a Hungarian citizen in August 2017. In July 2019 she married Russian figure skater Mikhail Kolyada.

== Career ==
=== Early years ===
Beklemisheva began learning to skate in 2002. Competing in partnership with Nikita Ermolaev, she placed 10th at the 2012 Russian Junior Championships. She skated with Yaroslav Maslov at the 2014 Russian Junior Championships, finishing 12th.

=== Partnership with Bobrov ===
Representing Russia, Beklemisheva and Maxim Bobrov competed together at two ISU Junior Grand Prix (JGP) events in October 2014; after placing fourth in Dresden, Germany, they won silver in Zagreb, Croatia. The pair qualified to the JGP Final in Barcelona, Spain, where they finished fourth.

Ranked fifth at the 2015 Russian Junior Championships, they were nominated to compete at the 2015 World Junior Championships after the withdrawal of Maria Vigalova / Egor Zakroev. They placed 10th in the short program, 12th in the free skate, and 11th overall in Tallinn, Estonia. Artur Dmitriev coached the pair in Moscow.

=== Partnership with Magyar ===
Around 2016, Beklemisheva teamed up with Márk Magyar to compete for Hungary on the senior level. Making their international debut, they won the bronze medal at the Bavarian Open in February 2017. In March, they placed 24th in the short program at the 2017 World Championships in Helsinki, Finland. Trudy Oltmanns coached the pair in Shakopee, Minnesota, until the end of the season.

For the 2017–2018 season, Beklemisheva/Magyar decided to train with Robin Szolkowy, Maylin Wende, and Daniel Wende in Oberstdorf, Germany, and Zürich, Switzerland. The pair placed 8th at the 2017 CS Lombardia Trophy and 16th at the 2017 CS Nebelhorn Trophy.

== Programs ==
=== With Magyar ===
Season	Short program	Free skating
2017–2018	The Deer by Woodkid	Dreamgirls; Listen; One Night Only
2016–2017	Beneath Your Beautiful by Labrinth, Emeli Sandé	Time to Say Goodbye performed by Andrea Bocelli, Sarah Brightman

=== With Bobrov ===
Season	Short program	Free skating
2014–2015	Charade (medley waltz) by Liberace	Hallelujah performed by Lisa Lois

== Competitive highlights ==
CS: Challenger Series; JGP: Junior Grand Prix

=== With Magyar for Hungary ===
International
Event	2016–17	2017–18
World Championships	24th	
CS Lombardia Trophy		8th
CS Nebelhorn Trophy		16th
Bavarian Open	3rd	
International Challenge Cup	1st	
WD = Withdrew

=== With Ermolaev, Maslov, and Bobrov for Russia ===
International
Event	2011–12 (Ermolaev)	2013–14 (Maslov)	2014–15 (Bobrov)
World Junior Champ.			11th
JGP Final			4th
JGP Croatia			2nd
JGP Germany			4th
National
Russian Junior Champ.	10th	12th	5th
Russian Cup Final			1st J
J = Junior level
