= Taylor Tran =

American-born competitive ice dancer

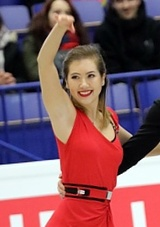

Personal information
- Born: September 15, 1992 (age 34) Loma Linda, California, U.S.
- Height: 5 ft 4 in (1.63 m)

Figure skating career
- Country: Lithuania
- Partner: Saulius Ambrulevičius
- Coach: Marina Zueva
- Skating club: Baltų Ainiai
- Began skating: 1998
- Retired: April 15, 2017

Taylor Tran (born September 15, 1992 in Loma Linda, California) is an American-born former competitive ice dancer who competed for Lithuania with partner Saulius Ambrulevičius. Together, they are the 2015 Pavel Roman Memorial silver medalists and 2015 Lithuanian national champions. They qualified to the free dance at the 2017 European Championships.

== Career ==
Tran began learning to skate in 1998. She began a partnership with Samuel Kaplun in July 2012. The two finished 13th in senior ice dancing at the 2013 U.S. Championships.

=== Ice dance with Saulius Ambrulevičius (for Lithuania) ===
Around July 2014, Tran teamed up with Lithuania's Saulius Ambrulevičius, who had decided to switch from single skating. They elected to represent Lithuania and made their international debut at the Tallinn Trophy in December 2014. At the Estonian event, they finished 5th and earned the minimum scores to appear at the 2015 European Championships in Stockholm. They missed the cut for the free dance in Sweden and at the 2016 European Championships in Bratislava, Slovakia.

Tran/Ambrulevičius qualified to the final segment at the 2017 European Championships in Ostrava, Czech Republic; they ranked 20th in the short dance, 17th in the free, and 18th overall. After the 2017 World Championships Ambrulevičius and T. Tran announced that they were separating and would not compete together any more.

== Programs ==
=== Ice dance with Saulius Ambrulevičius (for Lithuania) ===
Season	Short dance	Free dance
2016–17	Blues: Goodnight Moon by Shivaree; Rock'n'Roll	Adagio pour piano by Saint-Preux
2015–16	Carousel; The Carousel Waltz; June Is Busting Out All Over	Nights of Cabiria by Nino Rota
2014–15	Paso doble: La Paloma; Paso doble: El Classico Taurino	Evita by Andrew Lloyd Webber; Waltz for Evita; Don't Cry For Me Argentina; A New Argentina

=== Ice dance with Sam Kaplun (for the United States) ===
Season	Short dance	Free dance
2012–13	Feuerfest! - Polka schnell, Op. 269; Wein, Weib und Gesang, Op. 333	La Foule; Je Ne Regrette Rien

== Competitive highlights ==
=== Ice dance with Saulius Ambrulevičius (for Lithuania) ===
Competition placements at senior level
Season	2014–15	2015–16	2016–17
World Championships			30th
European Championships	24th	25th	18th
Lithuanian Championships		1st	1st
CS Finlandia Trophy			8th
CS Ondrej Nepela Memorial			9th
CS U.S. Classic		8th	
CS Warsaw Cup		6th	
Autumn Classic		7th	
Bavarian Open		11th	
NRW Trophy			5th
Pavel Roman Memorial		2nd	
Tallinn Trophy	5th		

=== Ice dance with Sam Kaplun (for the United States) ===
National
Event	2012–13
U.S. Championships	13th
