= Mari Simonen =

United Nations official (born 1951)

Mari Simonen (born September 23, 1951) is a former Deputy Executive Director, External Relations, United Nations Affairs and Management of UNFPA, the United Nations Population Fund and focuses on United Nations reforms in particular. Her appointment was approved by UN Secretary-General Kofi Annan in March 2006.

Simonen, of Finland, was most recently the Director of UNFPA's Technical Support Division, a post she had held since November 1999. In that capacity, she oversaw a staff of international technical experts in public health; reproductive health; HIV/AIDS; population studies; gender and human rights; and other specialized areas of work in support of population and development issues worldwide.

Prior to that position, Simonen was the Chief of the Office of the Executive Director at UNFPA, a strategic position from which she helped the Executive Director carry out her functions as the secretary-general of the historic 1994 Cairo International Conference on Population and Development.

Before joining the United Nations in 1980, Simonen worked at the University of California, Berkeley. She holds a doctorate degree from that university in Education. She has a bachelor's degree in sociology from Stanford University and a master's degree in sociology of education from the Stanford Graduate School of Education.

In November 2011, Simonen was appointed Chair of VSO, an international development charity working through volunteers in over 35 countries across Africa, Asia and the Pacific.
