= Emilia Simonen =

Finnish pair skater

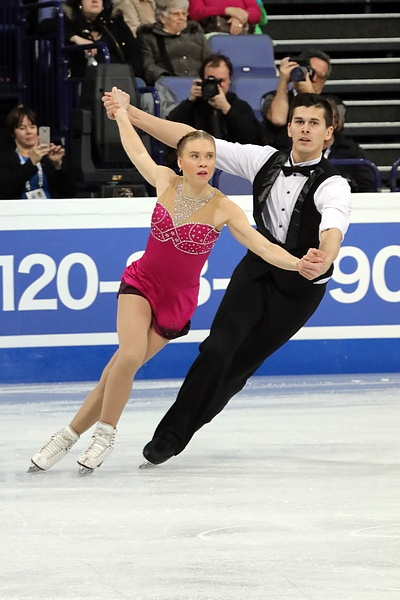
- Simonen and Penasse in 2017

Personal information
- Born: 12 January 1996 (age 30) Kuopio
- Home town: Siilinjärvi
- Height: 1.62 m (5 ft 4 in)

Figure skating career
- Country: Finland
- Partner: Matthew Penasse
- Coach: Kevin Wheeler; L. Collin-Knoblauch; C. Chanski; Michelle Wheeler
- Skating club: Kuopio FSC
- Began skating: 2002

Emilia Simonen (born 12 January 1996) is a Finnish pair skater. With her partner, Matthew Penasse, she is the 2017 Finnish National Champion. They competed at the 2017 World Championships, becoming the first Finnish pair skaters to compete at World Championships since 1983.

== Personal life ==
Simonen's grandparents competed in pair skating in the 1950s and were Finnish National Champions.

== Career ==
=== Single skating ===
Simonen competed in single skating at the Finnish Championships at the Junior level in 2012 and 2013.

=== Pair skating ===
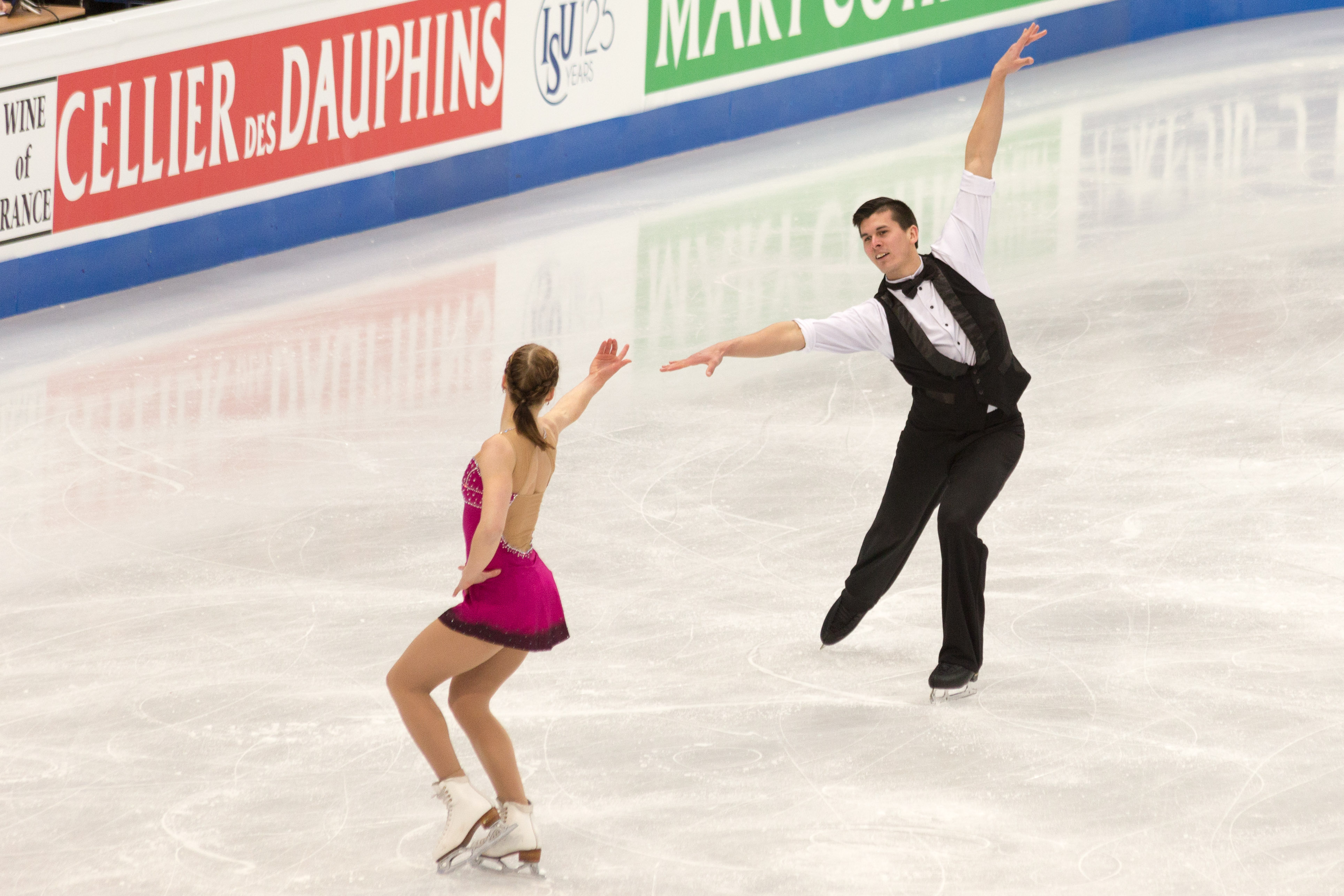
Simonen and Penasse at the 2017 Worlds

Simonen teamed up with Matthew Penasse in the 2016 summer. They won the 2017 Finnish Championships in December 2016. They qualified for the 2017 Worlds at their first international competition together, the 2017 Bavarian Open. At the World Championships they skated a new personal best i their short program and placed 25th. The Finnish Figure Skating Association stated on 18 May 2017 that Simonen and Penasse had ended their partnership, and both were searching for new partners.

== Programs ==
(with Penasse)

Season	Short program	Free program
2016–2017	Dream a Little Dream of Me performed by Ella Fitzgerald, Louis Armstrong	Nocturne by Paul Schwartz performed by Lucia Micarelli; Bohemian Rhapsody by Queen
