= 2009–10 Australian Figure Skating Championships =

Figure skating competition

- Type: National Championship
- Date: 15 August – 22, 2009
- Season: 2009–10
- Location: Penrith, Canterbury
- Venue: PIP, COIR

Champions
- Men's singles: Robert McNamara
- Ladies' singles: Cheltzie Lee
- Ice dance: Danielle O'Brien / Gregory Merriman
- Synchronized skating: Fire on Ice
- Previous: 2008–09 Australian Championships
- Next: 2010–11 Australian Championships

The 2009–10 Australian Figure Skating Championships was held in Penrith and Canterbury from 15 through 22 August 2009. Skaters competed in the disciplines of men's singles, ladies' singles, ice dancing, and synchronized skating across many levels, including senior, junior, novice, adult, and the pre-novice disciplines of primary and intermediate.

Skaters from New Zealand and Japan competed as guest skaters and their results were discounted from the final results.

== Senior results ==
=== Men's singles ===
Rank	Name	Total points	SP		FS	
1	Robert McNamara	139.81	5	45.31	1	94.50
2	Mark Webster	137.77	1	53.12	2	84.65
3	Matthew Precious	132.32	2	50.57	3	81.75
4	Nicholas Fernandez	125.60	4	45.39	4	80.21
5	Dean Timmins	118.66	3	47.36	7	71.30
6	Mitchell Chapman	116.10	6	44.07	6	72.03
7	Andrew Dodds	105.44	7	32.19	5	73.25
–	(New Zealand) Cameron Hems	81.44	8	22.45	8	58.99

=== Women's singles ===
Rank	Name	Total points	SP		FS	
1	Cheltzie Lee	140.34	1	48.06	1	92.28
2	Tina Wang	107.53	3	40.95	3	66.58
–	(New Zealand) Allie Rout	100.39	2	42.15	4	58.24
3	Phoebe Di Tommaso	99.77	4	32.51	2	67.26
4	Fei Fei Hardy	75.15	5	25.94	5	49.21
5	Kayla Doig	70.70	6	22.69	6	48.01

=== Ice dance ===
Rank	Name	Total points	CD		OD		FD	
1	Danielle O'Brien / Gregory Merriman	147.06	1	29.63	1	43.28	1	74.15
2	Maria Borounov / Evgueni Borounov	120.10	2	24.95	2	33.24	2	61.91

=== Synchronized skating ===
Rank	Name	Total points	SP		FS	
1	Fire on Ice	120.16	1	45.97	1	74.19
2	Adelaide Ice Magic	83.60	2	33.71	2	49.89
–	(New Zealand) Icentric	74.17	3	27.87	3	46.30
–	(New Zealand) Ice Statix	68.06	4	24.86	4	43.20

== Junior results ==
=== Men's singles ===
Rank	Name	Region	Total points	SP		FS	
1	Brendan Kerry	NSW	125.83	3	37.28	1	88.55
2	Simon Hardy	NSW	111.17	1	43.08	3	68.09
3	David Kranjec	QLD	108.92	6	33.64	2	75.28
4	Andrew Dodds	QLD	104.40	2	40.17	5	64.23
5	Mathew Tinson	WA	102.46	4	35.38	4	67.08
6	Matthew Dodds	QLD	95.67	9	31.77	6	63.90
7	Storm Scrimmager	NSW	95.07	8	32.90	8	62.17
–	(New Zealand) Cameron Hems	New Zealand	94.24	7	33.04	9	61.20
8	Robert Ashman	ACT	92.07	10	29.88	7	62.19
9	Zachary Ockenden	QLD	90.24	5	33.67	10	56.57
10	Brad Mclachlan	NSW	79.92	11	25.22	11	54.70

=== Women's singles ===
Rank	Name	Total points	SP		FS	
1	Jaimee Nobbs	107.17	1	39.03	1	68.14
2	Chantelle Kerry	99.85	2	38.16	2	61.69
3	Zara Pasfield	88.65	3	32.37	4	56.28
4	Sydnee Knight	85.44	7	27.63	3	57.81
–	(New Zealand) Samantha Waugh	79.67	8	25.67	5	54.00
5	Montana Sumner	75.99	5	29.74	9	46.25
6	Anna Dekany	75.03	6	29.09	10	45.94
7	Alannah Stott	73.97	4	30.54	11	43.43
8	Kayla Doig	72.28	11	25.37	8	46.91
9	Alicia Kijak	71.64	13	24.68	7	46.96
10	Rikki Lee Goswell	70.86	14	23.49	6	47.37
11	Lowanna Gibson	67.49	10	25.50	13	41.99
–	Saya Iwasaki	65.49	9	25.54	14	39.95
11	Danielle Bartels	63.48	17	20.70	12	42.78
–	(New Zealand) Ariel Nadas	62.59	12	25.34	16	37.25
12	Kara Johnson	62.01	15	23.23	15	38.78
–	(New Zealand) Melissa Morris	55.15	16	20.73	17	34.42

=== Ice dance ===
Rank	Name	Total points	CD1		CD2		OD		FD	
–	(New Zealand) Ayesha Campbell / Shane Speden	103.87	1	11.91	1	11.37	1	29.58	1	51.01
1	Lisa Phillips / Andrew Budd	62.89	2	10.42	2	9.16	2	15.76	2	27.55

=== Synchronized skating ===
Rank	Name	Total points	SP		FS	
1	Nova	99.07	2	36.89	1	62.18
2	Iceskateers Elite	95.17	1	37.91	2	57.26
3	Infusion	84.33	5	31.61	3	52.72
–	(New Zealand) Botany N-Synch	83.05	3	32.88	4	50.17
4	Macquarie Illusions	82.81	4	32.86	5	49.95
