= Australian Figure Skating Championships =

Recurring figure skating competition

- Status: Active
- Genre: National championships
- Frequency: Annual
- Country: Australia
- Inaugurated: 1931
- Organiser: Ice Skating Australia

The Australian Figure Skating Championships are an annual figure skating competition organised by Ice Skating Australia to crown the national champions of Australia. The first official Australian Championships were held in 1931 in Sydney as a joint event organised when the skating federations of Victoria and New South Wales merged to form the Australian National Council of Ice-Skating. For years, championships alternated between Sydney and Melbourne. The Australian Championships have been interrupted twice during their history: from 1940 to 1946 due to World War II, and in 2020 and 2021 due to the COVID-19 pandemic.

Medals are awarded in men's singles, women's singles, pair skating, ice dance, and synchronized skating at the senior and junior levels, although each discipline may not necessarily be held every year due to a lack of participants. Brendan Kerry and Cameron Medhurst are tied for winning the most Australian Championship titles in men's singles (with eight each), while Joanne Carter holds the record in women's singles (with seven). Danielle Carr and Stephen Carr hold the record in pair skating (with nineteen), while Danielle O'Brien and Gregory Merriman hold the record in ice dance (with seven).

== History ==
Prior to 1931, figure skating in Australia was overseen by two independent organisations – the National Ice-Skating Association of Australia (based in Melbourne) and the National Ice-Skating Association of New South Wales (based in Sydney) – and each held their own respective championship events. In 1931, the two federations merged to form the Australian National Council of Ice-Skating, and they held Australia's first national championship event in figure skating in Sydney. Jack Gordon won the men's event, Myrie Reid won the women's event, Miss A. Maxwell and Robert Jackson won the pairs event, and Jackson also won the ice dance event (then called the waltzing competition) with Phyllis Turner. Since then, Sydney and Melbourne alternated as hosts until 1976, when the championships were finally held in a new location: Brisbane.

Australia frequently sent a contingent of skaters to New Zealand to compete at the New Zealand Figure Skating Championships. Brian Meek and Margaret Doolan won the men's and women's events in 1976, respectively; Edwina Sloman and Bill Hewison won the pairs event in 1966; Stephen Carr won the men's event in 1987; Rebecca Khoo and Evgeni Borounov won the ice dance event in 2000; and Sarah-Yvonne Prytula won the women's event in 2003. The reverse is also true: many skaters from New Zealand have also traveled to Australia to compete in the Australian Championships. Tristan Thode of New Zealand won the men's event at the 2007 Australian Championships, and Alexandra Rout won the women's event in 2008. While a guest skater from another country may be able to finish in first place and win the gold medal in an Australian event, they do not receive the title of Australian Champion; that honour goes to the highest-scoring Australian skater.

An international competition – Skate Australia – was held in conjunction with the 1985 Australian Championships to celebrate the 150th anniversary of Victoria. The Australian Championships have twice been interrupted: from 1940 to 1946 due to World War II, and in 2020 and 2021 due to the COVID-19 pandemic.

== Senior medalists ==
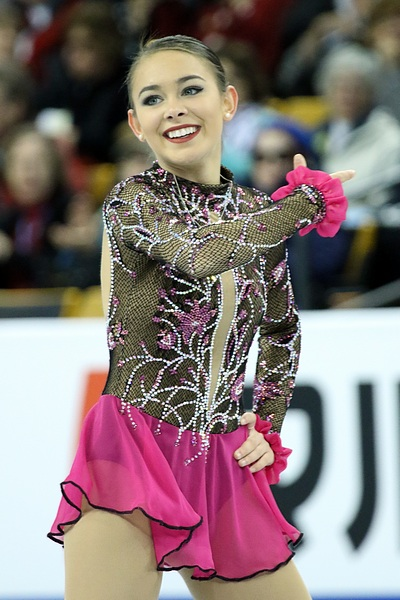
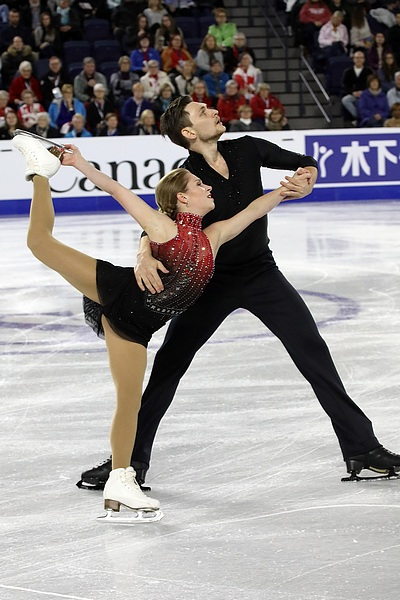
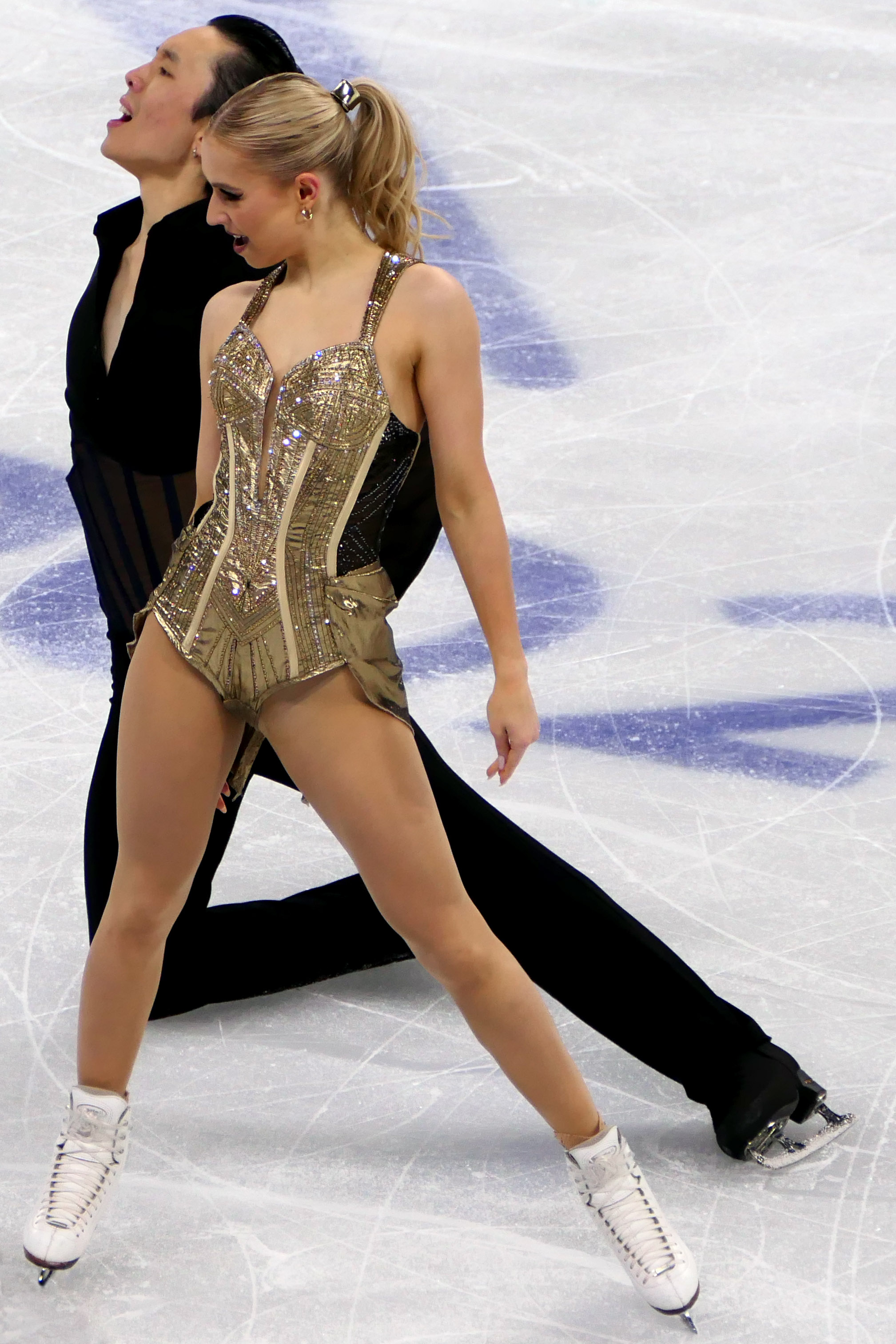
From left to right: Kailani Craine, six-time Australian champion in women's singles; Ekaterina Alexandrovskaya and Harley Windsor, two-time Australian champions in pair skating; and Holly Harris and Jason Chan, two-time Australian champions in ice dance

=== Men's singles ===
Senior men's event medalists
Season	Location	Gold	Silver	Bronze	Ref.
1931–32	Sydney	Jack Gordon	Francis Mercovich	Sydney Croll	
1932–33	Melbourne	Jack Gordon	Francis Mercovich	Sydney Croll	
1933–34	Sydney	Jack Gordon	Sydney Croll	No other competitors	
1934–35	Melbourne	Francis Mercovich	Jack Gordon	Sydney Croll	
1935–36	Sydney	No men's competitors			
1936–37	Melbourne	Francis Mercovich	No other competitors		
1937–38	Sydney	Ron Chambers	Sydney Croll	No other competitors	
1938–39	Melbourne	No men's competitors			
1939–40	Sydney	Sydney Croll	No other competitors		
1940–47	No competitions due to World War II				
1947–48	Melbourne	William Taylor	No other competitors		
1948–49	Sydney	William Taylor	William Hinchy	Reg Park	
1949–50	Melbourne	Reg Park	(No records found)		(Note: Reg Park won the men's championship title in 1949.)
1950–51	Sydney	Adrian Swan (Note: Neither Adrian Swan nor Ron Cook achieved the minimum required score to be named the Australian champion.)	Ron Cook	No other competitors	
1951–52	Melbourne	Ron Cook (Note: Ron Cook did not achieve the minimum required score to be named the Australian champion.)	No other competitors		
1952–53	Sydney	Allan Ganter	Frank Parsons	Charles Keeble	
1953–54	Melbourne	Allan Ganter	Frank Parsons	Charles Keeble	
1954–55	Sydney	Allan Ganter	Charles Keeble	No other competitors	
1955–56	Melbourne	Allan Ganter	(No records found)		(Note: Allan Ganter won the men's championship title in 1955.)
1956–57	Melbourne	No men's champion			
1957–58	(No record found)	Tim Spencer	(No records found)		(Note: Tim Spencer won the men's championship titles in 1957 and 1958.)
1958–59	Melbourne	Tim Spencer	(No records found)		(Note: Tim Spencer won the men's championship titles in 1957 and 1958.)
1959–60	Melbourne	William Cherrell	Tim Spencer	David Price	
1960–61	(No record found)	No men's champion			
1961–73	No men's competitors				
1973–74	Sydney	William Schober	No other competitors		
1974–75	Melbourne	William Schober	No other competitors		
1975–76	Sydney	William Schober	Mark Lynch	No other competitors	
1976–77	Brisbane	William Schober	Brian Meek	No other competitors	
1977–78	Melbourne	Brian Meek	Michael Pasfield	No other competitors	
1978–79	Sydney	William Schober	Michael Pasfield	Glen Neate	
1979–80	Melbourne	William Schober	Michael Pasfield	Mark Basto	
1980–81	(No record found)	Michael Pasfield	Cameron Medhurst	(No record found)	
1981–82	Brisbane	Michael Pasfield	Cameron Medhurst	Brad McLean	
1982–83	Sydney	Cameron Medhurst	Perry Meek	Mark Basto	
1983–84	Perth	Perry Meek	Cameron Medhurst	Stephen Carr	
1984–85	Brisbane	Cameron Medhurst	(No records found)		(Note: Cameron Medhurst won the men's championship title from 1984 to 1990.)
1985–86	Melbourne	Cameron Medhurst	(No records found)		(Note: Cameron Medhurst won the men's championship title from 1984 to 1990.)
1986–87	Adelaide	Cameron Medhurst	(No records found)		(Note: Cameron Medhurst won the men's championship title from 1984 to 1990.)
1987–88	Brisbane	Cameron Medhurst	(No records found)		(Note: Cameron Medhurst won the men's championship title from 1984 to 1990.)
1988–89	Sydney	Cameron Medhurst	(No records found)		(Note: Cameron Medhurst won the men's championship title from 1984 to 1990.)
1989–90	Perth	Cameron Medhurst	(No records found)		(Note: Cameron Medhurst won the men's championship title from 1984 to 1990.)
1990–91	Sydney	Cameron Medhurst	(No records found)		(Note: Cameron Medhurst won the men's championship title from 1984 to 1990.)
1991–92	Canberra	Stephen Carr	Ashley Wilson	Adam Hart	
1992–93	Bendigo	Stephen Carr	George Galanis	Ashley Wilson	
1993–94	Brisbane	Stephen Carr	Andrew Roy	No other competitors	
1994–95	Sydney	Stephen Carr	(No records found)		(Note: Stephen Carr won the men's championship title in 1994.)
1995–96	Canberra	Anthony Liu (China) (Note: George Galanis was named the Australian champion, because Anthony Liu, the first-place finisher, was a guest skater from China.)	George Galanis	Stephen Carr	
1996–97	Perth	Anthony Liu	Michael Amentas	Andrew Roy	
1997–98	Sydney	Anthony Liu	Michael Amentas	No other competitors	
1998–99	Melbourne	Anthony Liu	Michael Amentas	No other competitors	
1999–2000	Adelaide	Anthony Liu	Michael Amentas	Peter Nicholas	
2000–01	Perth	Anthony Liu	Peter Nicholas	Bradley Santer	
2001–02	Sydney	Anthony Liu	Bradley Santer	Ricky Cockerill (New Zealand)	
2002–03	Brisbane	Anthony Liu	Bradley Santer	Ricky Cockerill (New Zealand)	
2003–04	Brisbane	Bradley Santer	Daniel Harries	Stuart Beckingham	
2004–05	Sydney	Bradley Santer	Sean Carlow	Ricky Cockerill (New Zealand)	
2005–06	Perth	Sean Carlow	Bradley Santer	Tristan Thode (New Zealand)	
2006–07	Brisbane	Sean Carlow	Bradley Santer	(United Kingdom) Simon Waller (Great Britain)	
2007–08	Lake Macquarie	Sean Carlow	Tristan Thode (New Zealand)	Nicholas Fernandez	
2008–09	Brisbane	Tristan Thode (New Zealand) (Note: Nicholas Fernandez was named the Australian champion, because Tristan Thode, the first-place finisher, was a guest skater from New Zealand.)	Nicholas Fernandez	Mark Webster	
2009–10	Sydney	Robert McNamara	Mark Webster	Matthew Precious	
2010–11	Melbourne	Mark Webster	Robert McNamara	Mitchell Chapman	
2011–12	Brisbane	Brendan Kerry	Nicholas Fernandez	Andrew Dodds	
2012–13	Brisbane	David Kranjec	Brendan Kerry	Jordan Dodds	
2013–14	Melbourne	Brendan Kerry	David Kranjec	Mark Webster	
2014–15	Brisbane	Brendan Kerry	Cameron Hemmert	Andrew Dodds	
2015–16	Sydney	Brendan Kerry	Andrew Dodds	Jordan Dodds	
2016–17	Melbourne	Brendan Kerry	James Min	Andrew Dodds	
2017–18	Brisbane	Brendan Kerry	Andrew Dodds	Mark Webster	
2018–19	Sydney	Brendan Kerry	Andrew Dodds	James Min	
2019–20	Melbourne	Brendan Kerry	James Min	Darian Kaptich	
2020–21	Brisbane	Competitions cancelled due to the COVID-19 pandemic			
2021–22	Brisbane	Competitions cancelled due to the COVID-19 pandemic			
2022–23	Brisbane	Darian Kaptich	Charlton Doherty	Callum Bradshaw	
2023–24	Erina	Darian Kaptich	Douglas Gerber	No other competitors	
2024–25	Melbourne	Darian Kaptich	Julio Potapenko	Douglas Gerber	
2025–26	Brisbane	Julio Potapenko	Douglas Gerber	Charlton Doherty	

=== Women's singles ===
Senior women's event medalists
Season	Location	Gold	Silver	Bronze	Ref.
1931–32	Sydney	Myrie Reid	Winsome Thackeray	Mrs. J. Benn	
1932–33	Melbourne	Dorothy Tickle	Winsome Thackeray	Vera Pincott & Kathleen McGill (tie)	
1933–34	Sydney	Winsome Thackeray	Mrs. Fred Thomas	No other competitors	
1934–35	Melbourne	Winsome Thackeray	Mrs. Fred Thomas	No other competitors	
1935–36	Sydney	Myrie Reid	Ms. J. Benn	No other competitors	
1936–37	Melbourne	Betty Cornwell	Myrie Reid	No other competitors	
1937–38	Sydney	Betty Cornwell	No other competitors		
1938–39	Melbourne	Betty Cornwell	(No records found)		(Note: Betty Cornwell won the women's championship title in 1938.)
1939–40	Sydney	June Weedon	Pat Matthews	Enid Shawe	
1940–47	No competitions due to World War II				
1947–48	Melbourne	Patricia Molony	Gweneth Molony	Gwen Jones	
1948–49	Sydney	Alison Paynter	Ann MacGillicuddy	Thelma Homsey	
1949–50	Melbourne	Gweneth Molony	(No records found)		(Note: Gweneth Molony won the women's championship title in 1949.)
1950–51	Sydney	Gweneth Molony	Nancy Hallam	Loretta Brain	
1951–52	Melbourne	Gweneth Molony	Loretta Brain	Dawn Hunter	
1952–53	Sydney	Loretta Brain	Dawn Hunter	Coral Stuber	
1953–54	Melbourne	Dawn Hunter	Gloria Aiken	C. Waterman	
1954–55	Sydney	Dawn Hunter	(No records found)		(Note: Dawn Hunter won the women's championship titles in 1954 and 1955.)
1955–56	Melbourne	Dawn Hunter	(No records found)		(Note: Dawn Hunter won the women's championship titles in 1954 and 1955.)
1956–57	Melbourne	Loy Thomson	(No records found)		(Note: Loy Thomson won the women's championship title in 1956 and 1957.)
1957–58	(No record found)	Loy Thomson	(No records found)		(Note: Loy Thomson won the women's championship title in 1956 and 1957.)
1958–59	Melbourne	Aileen Shaw	(No records found)		(Note: Aileen Shaw won the women's championship title in 1958 and 1960.)
1959–60	Melbourne	Aileen Shaw	Mary Wilson	Mary-Ellen Holland	
1960–61	(No record found)	Aileen Shaw	(No records found)		
1961–62	Sydney	Aileen Shaw	June Hicks	Mary-Ellen Holland	
1962–63	(No records found)	Cheryl Helmore	(No records found)		(Note: Cheryl Helmore won the women's championship title in 1962.)
1963–64	(No records found)	Aileen Shaw	(No records found)		(Note: Aileen Shaw won the women's championship title in 1962.)
1964–65	(No records found)	Mary-Ellen Holland	(No records found)		(Note: Mary-Ellen Holland won the women's championship titles from 1964 to 1966.)
1965–66	(No records found)	Mary-Ellen Holland	(No records found)		(Note: Mary-Ellen Holland won the women's championship titles from 1964 to 1966.)
1966–67	(No records found)	Mary-Ellen Holland	(No records found)		(Note: Mary-Ellen Holland won the women's championship titles from 1964 to 1966.)
1967–68	Sydney	Mary-Ellen Holland	Cheryl Helmore	Robyn Saynor	
1968–69	(No record found)	Janet Schwarz	Robyn Saynor	Judith Horsnell	
1969–70	Sydney	Janet Schwarz	Judith Horsnell	Christine Hunter	
1970–71	Melbourne	Janet Schwarz	Judith Horsnell	Ann Gartner	
1971–72	Melbourne	Janet Schwarz	Sharon Burley	Vicki Reid	
1972–73	Brisbane	Sharon Burley	Robyn Burley	Judith Horsnell	
1973–74	Sydney	Sharon Burley	Robyn Burley	Wyneira Evans	
1974–75	Melbourne	Sharon Burley	Robyn Burley	Belinda Coulthard	
1975–76	Sydney	Sharon Burley	Robyn Burley	Belinda Coulthard	
1976–77	Brisbane	Robyn Burley	Belinda Coulthard	Lyndal Hicks	
1977–78	Melbourne	Robyn Burley	Belinda Coulthard	Katie Symmonds (New Zealand)	
1978–79	Sydney	Robyn Burley	Belinda Coulthard	Vicki Holland	
1979–80	Melbourne	Belinda Coulthard	Vicki Holland	Julie Hill	
1980–81	(No record found)	Vicki Holland	(No records found)		(Note: Vicki Holland won the women's championship titles from 1980 to 1981.)
1981–82	Brisbane	Vicki Holland	Melanie Buzek	(No record found)	(Note: Vicki Holland won the women's championship titles from 1980 to 1981.)
1982–83	Sydney	Vicki Holland	Amanda James	Sharon Gaylard	
1983–84	Perth	Vicki Holland	Diana Zovko-Nicolic	Amanda James	
1984–85	Brisbane	Amanda James	(No records found)		(Note: Amanda James won the women's championship title in 1984.)
1985–86	Melbourne	Diana Zovko-Nicolic	(No records found)		(Note: Diana Zovko-Nicolic won the women's championship title in 1985.)
1986–87	Adelaide	Tracy Brook	(No record found)	Popi Geros	
1987–88	Brisbane	Tracy Brook	(No records found)		
1988–89	Sydney	Tracy Brook	(No records found)		
1989–90	Perth	Tracey Damigella (United States) (Note: Tracey Damigella was not named the Australian champion, because she was a guest skater from the United States.)	(No records found)		
1990–91	Sydney	Tamara Heggen	(No records found)		(Note: Tamara Heggen won the women's championship titles from 1990 to 1992.)
1991–92	Canberra	Tamara Heggen	Hayley Antal	Miriam Manzano	
1992–93	Bendigo	Tamara Heggen	(No records found)		
1993–94	Brisbane	Miriam Manzano	Tamara Heggen	K. Fell	
1994–95	Sydney	Joanne Carter	Miriam Manzano	(No record found)	
1995–96	Canberra	Joanne Carter	Tamara Heggen	Miriam Manzano	
1996–97	Perth	Joanne Carter	Miriam Manzano	Andrea Boss	
1997–98	Sydney	Joanne Carter	Miriam Manzano	Michelle Kriz	
1998–99	Melbourne	Joanne Carter	Stephanie Zhang	Sarah-Yvonne Prytula	
1999–2000	Adelaide	Stephanie Zhang	Sarah-Yvonne Prytula	Andrea Boss	
2000–01	Perth	Stephanie Zhang	Miriam Manzano	Sarah-Yvonne Prytula	
2001–02	Sydney	Miriam Manzano	Stephanie Zhang	Joanne Carter	
2002–03	Brisbane	Miriam Manzano	Joanne Carter	Stephanie Zhang	
2003–04	Brisbane	Miriam Manzano	Joanne Carter	Sarah-Yvonne Prytula	
2004–05	Sydney	Miriam Manzano	Joanne Carter	Sarah-Yvonne Prytula	
2005–06	Perth	Miriam Manzano	Joanne Carter	Janna Kupec	
2006–07	Brisbane	Joanne Carter	Tina Wang	Janna Kupec	
2007–08	Lake Macquarie	Joanne Carter	Tina Wang	Alexandra Rout (New Zealand)	
2008–09	Brisbane	Alexandra Rout (New Zealand) (Note: Tina Wang was named the Australian champion, because Alexandra Rout, the first-place finisher, was a guest skater from New Zealand.)	Tina Wang	Jessica Kurzawski	
2009–10	Sydney	Cheltzie Lee	Tina Wang	Alexandra Rout (New Zealand)	
2010–11	Melbourne	Phoebe Di Tommaso	Albrina Lee	Jessica Kurzawski	
2011–12	Brisbane	Iryna Movchan (Ukraine) (Note: Zara Pasfield was named the Australian champion, because Iryna Movchan, the first-place finisher, was a guest skater from Ukraine.)	Zara Pasfield	Jaimee Nobbs	
2012–13	Brisbane	Chantelle Kerry	Brooklee Han	Stephanie Zhang	
2013–14	Melbourne	Brooklee Han	Taylor Dean	Jaimee Nobbs	
2014–15	Brisbane	Kailani Craine	Brooklee Han	Jaimee Nobbs	
2015–16	Sydney	Kailani Craine	Brooklee Han	Chantelle Kerry	
2016–17	Melbourne	Kailani Craine	Brooklee Han	Katie Pasfield	
2017–18	Brisbane	Kailani Craine	Amelia Jackson	Katie Pasfield	
2018–19	Sydney	Kailani Craine	Brooklee Han	Lucy Sori Yun	
2019–20	Melbourne	Kailani Craine	Yancey Chan	Ashley Colliver	
2020–21	Brisbane	Competitions cancelled due to the COVID-19 pandemic			
2021–22	Brisbane	Competitions cancelled due to the COVID-19 pandemic			
2022–23	Brisbane	Vlada Vasiliev	Hana Bath	Andrea Guo	
2023–24	Erina	Hana Bath	Vlada Vasiliev	Maria Chernyshova	
2024–25	Melbourne	Hana Bath	Maria Chernyshova	Sienna Kaczmarczyk	
2025–26	Brisbane	Sienna Kaczmarczyk	Victoria Alcantara	Simona Bhasin	

=== Pairs ===
Senior pairs' event medalists
Season	Location	Gold	Silver	Bronze	Ref.
1931–32	Sydney	Miss A. Maxwell; Robert Jackson	Miss M. Greenland; Sydney Croll	Winsome Thackeray; Cyril MacGillicuddy	
1932–33	Melbourne	Miss A. Maxwell; Robert Jackson	No other competitors		
1933–34	Sydney	Winsome Thackeray; Cyril MacGillicuddy	(No records found)		(Note: Winsome Thackeray and Cyril MacGillicuddy won the pairs' championship titles in 1933 and 1934.)
1934–35	Melbourne	Winsome Thackeray; Cyril MacGillicuddy	(No records found)		(Note: Winsome Thackeray and Cyril MacGillicuddy won the pairs' championship titles in 1933 and 1934.)
1935–36	Sydney	Alison Brown; Ron Butcher	Ms. M. Shortland; Mr. N. Locke	No other competitors	
1936–37	Melbourne	Alison Lyons; Ron Chambers	(No records found)		(Note: Alison Lyons and Ron Chambers won the pairs' championship title in 1936.)
1937–38	Sydney	Edith Adams; Ron Chambers	Betty Cornwell; Jack Gordon	Alison Brown; Ron Butcher	
1938–39	Melbourne	Betty Cornwell; Jack Gordon	(No records found)		(Note: Betty Cornwell and Jack Gordon won the pairs' championship title in 1938.)
1939–40	Sydney	Alison Brown; Ron Butcher	No other competitors		
1940–47	No competitions due to World War II				
1947–48	Melbourne	Shirley Carroll; Reg Park	Thelma Homsey; William Hinchey	No other competitors	
1948–49	Sydney	Thelma Homsey; William Hinchey	Shirley Carroll; Reg Park	Betty Stringer; Adrian Swan	
1949–50	Melbourne	Gweneth Molony; Adrian Swan	(No records found)		(Note: Gweneth Molony and Adrian Swan won the pairs' championship title in 1949.)
1950–51	Sydney	Gweneth Molony; Adrian Swan	Loretta Brain; Colin Martin	Gloria Aiken; Bob Watson	
1951–52	Melbourne	Jacqueline Kendall-Baker (née Mason); Mervyn Bower	Beryl Moore; Frank Parsons	No other competitors	
1952–53	Sydney	Jacqueline Kendall-Baker (née Mason); Mervyn Bower	Gloria Aiken; Bob Watson	Beryl Moore; Frank Parsons	
1953–54	Melbourne	Jacqueline Kendall-Baker (née Mason); Mervyn Bower	Gloria Aiken; Bob Watson	No other competitors	(Note: Jacqueline Mason and Mervyn Bower won the pairs' championship title from 1951 to 1959, in 1961, and 1963.)
1954–55	Sydney	Jacqueline Kendall-Baker (née Mason); Mervyn Bower	Lorraine Anderson; Ray Ashton	No other competitors	
1955–56	Melbourne	Jacqueline Kendall-Baker (née Mason); Mervyn Bower	(No records found)		
1956–57	Melbourne	Jacqueline Kendall-Baker (née Mason); Mervyn Bower	(No records found)		
1957–58	(No records found)	Jacqueline Kendall-Baker (née Mason); Mervyn Bower	(No records found)		
1958–59	Melbourne	Jacqueline Kendall-Baker (née Mason); Mervyn Bower	(No records found)		
1959–60	Melbourne	Jacqueline Kendall-Baker (née Mason); Mervyn Bower	A. Gardiner; Ray Ashton	No other competitors	
1960–61	(No record found)	No pairs competitors			
1961–62	Sydney	Jacqueline Kendall-Baker (née Mason); Mervyn Bower	(No records found)		
1962–63	(No records found)	Yvonne Whys; Wayne Caldwell	(No records found)		(Note: Yvonne Whys and Wayne Caldwell won the pairs' championship title in 1962.)
1963–64	(No records found)	Jacqueline Kendall-Baker (née Mason); Mervyn Bower	(No records found)		
1964–65	(No records found)	Diana Taylor; David Price	(No records found)		(Note: Diana Taylor and David Price won the pairs' championship title in 1964 and 1966.)
1965–66	(No records found)	Loryn Sorenson (née Gough); Colin Jackson	Dianne White; Murray Herriott	Lesley Anderson; Leslie Coxon	
1966–67	(No records found)	Diana Taylor; David Price	(No records found)		
1967–68	Sydney	Loryn Sorenson (née Gough); Frank Chiementon	Diana Taylor; David Price	Robyn Webb; Colin Jackson	
1968–69	(No record found)	Loryn Sorenson (née Gough); Frank Chiementon	No other competitors		
1969–70	Sydney	Loryn Sorenson (née Gough); Frank Chiementon	Petricia Browne; Kelvin Nicolle	No other competitors	
1970–71	Melbourne	Robyn Webb; Colin Jackson	No other competitors		
1971–72	Melbourne	Belinda Coulthard; Mark Lynch	Jennifer Ingrey; R. Waluga	No other competitors	
1972–73	Brisbane	Belinda Coulthard; Mark Lynch	R. Messing; Colin Jackson	No other competitors	
1973–74	Sydney	Belinda Coulthard; Mark Lynch	No other competitors		
1974–75	Melbourne	Belinda Coulthard; Mark Lynch	No other competitors		
1975–76	Sydney	Elizabeth Cain; Peter Cain	No other competitors		
1976–77	Brisbane	Elizabeth Cain; Peter Cain	No other competitors		
1977–78	Melbourne	Elizabeth Cain; Peter Cain	(No records found)		(Note: Elizabeth Cain and Peter Cain won the pairs' championship titles in 1977.)
1978–79	Sydney	Eva Fabian; George Fabian	No other competitors		
1979–80	Melbourne	Elizabeth Cain; Peter Cain	No other competitors		
1980–81	(No record found)	Danielle Carr; Stephen Carr	(No records found)		(Note: Danielle Carr and Stephen Carr won the pairs' championship titles from 1980 to 1998.)
1981–82	Brisbane	Danielle Carr; Stephen Carr	(No records found)		(Note: Danielle Carr and Stephen Carr won the pairs' championship titles from 1980 to 1998.)
1982–83	Sydney	Danielle Carr; Stephen Carr	No other competitors		
1983–84	Perth	Danielle Carr; Stephen Carr	Danielle Baurycza; Rodney Baurycza	No other competitors	
1984–85	Brisbane	Danielle Carr; Stephen Carr	(No records found)		
1985–86	Melbourne	Danielle Carr; Stephen Carr	(No records found)		
1986–87	Adelaide	Danielle Carr; Stephen Carr	(No records found)		
1987–88	Brisbane	Danielle Carr; Stephen Carr	(No records found)		
1988–89	Sydney	Danielle Carr; Stephen Carr	(No records found)		
1989–90	Perth	Danielle Carr; Stephen Carr	(No records found)		
1990–91	Sydney	Danielle Carr; Stephen Carr	Christine Seydel; John Pritchard-Wafford	(No record found)	
1991–92	Canberra	Danielle Carr; Stephen Carr	Rochelle Manning; Stephen Roberts	No other competitors	
1992–93	Bendigo	Danielle Carr; Stephen Carr	(No records found)		
1993–94	Brisbane	Danielle Carr; Stephen Carr	No other competitors		
1994–95	Sydney	Danielle Carr; Stephen Carr	(No records found)		
1995–96	Canberra	Danielle Carr; Stephen Carr	No other competitors		
1996–97	Perth	Danielle Carr; Stephen Carr	No other competitors		
1997–98	Sydney	Danielle Carr; Stephen Carr	No other competitors		
1998–99	Melbourne	Danielle Carr; Stephen Carr	Bethany McLean; Adam King	No other competitors	
1999–2000	Adelaide	Amanda Paton; Adam King	No other competitors		
2000–05	No pairs competitors				(Note: Amanda Paton and Adam King won the pairs' championship title in 1994.)
2005–06	Perth	Emma Brien; Stuart Beckingham	No other competitors		
2006–12	No pairs competitors				
2012–13	Brisbane	Emma Greensill; Matthew Dodds	No other competitors		
2013–14	Melbourne	Paris Stephens; Matthew Dodds	No other competitors		
2014–15	Brisbane	Paris Stephens; Matthew Dodds	Harmonie Wong; Joda Walter	No other competitors	
2015–16	Sydney	Paris Stephens; Matthew Dodds	No other competitors		
2016–17	Melbourne	Ekaterina Alexandrovskaya; Harley Windsor	Paris Stephens; Matthew Dodds	No other competitors	
2017–18	Brisbane	Paris Stephens; Matthew Dodds	No other competitors		
2018–19	Sydney	Ekaterina Alexandrovskaya; Harley Windsor	No other competitors		
2019–20	Melbourne	No pairs competitors			
2020–21	Brisbane	Competitions cancelled due to the COVID-19 pandemic			
2021–22	Brisbane	Competitions cancelled due to the COVID-19 pandemic			
2022–23	Brisbane	No pairs competitors			
2023–24	Erina	Anastasia Golubeva; Hektor Giotopoulos Moore	No other competitors		
2024–26	No pairs competitors				

=== Ice dance ===
Senior ice dance event medalists
Season	Location	Gold	Silver	Bronze	Ref.
1931–32	Sydney	Phyllis Turner; Robert Jackson	Winsome Thackeray; Cyril MacGillicuddy	Miss E. Salmonow; Jack Gordon; &: Kathleen Kennedy; Mr. H.D. Foore; (tie)	
1932–33	Melbourne	Phyllis Turner; Robert Jackson	Kathleen Kennedy; Sydney Croll	Miss Fay; Mr. H.D. Foore	
1933–34	Sydney	Kathleen Kennedy; Sydney Croll	(No records found)		(Note: Kathleen Kennedy and Sydney Cross won the ice dance championship title in 1933.)
1934–35	Melbourne	Winsome Thackeray; Cyril MacGillicuddy	Kathleen Kennedy; Sydney Croll	Clarice Kennedy; J.T. Brown	
1935–36	Sydney	Kathleen Kennedy; Sydney Croll	Clarice Kennedy; J.T. Brown	Marie Lansel; Robert Jackson	
1936–37	Melbourne	Kathleen Kennedy; Sydney Croll	(No records found)		(Note: Kathleen Kennedy and Sydney Cross won the ice dance championship title in 1936.)
1937–38	Sydney	Kathleen Kennedy; Sydney Croll	Edith Adams; Ron Chambers	Shirley Gould; Jack Maloney	
1938–39	Melbourne	Shirley Gould; Jack Maloney	(No records found)		(Note: Shirley Gould and Jack Maloney won the ice dance championship title in 1938.)
1939–40	Sydney	Nance Connor; J.T. Brown	No other competitors		
1940–47	No competitions due to World War II				
1947–48	Melbourne	Ann MacGillicuddy; William Taylor	Patricia Molony; K. Griffen	Thelma Homsey; William Hinchey	
1948–49	Sydney	Ann MacGillicuddy; William Taylor	Thelma Homsey; William Hinchey	Rae Holderness; Donald McKnight	
1949–50	Melbourne	Ann MacGillicuddy; William Taylor	(No records found)		(Note: Ann MacGillicuddy and William Taylor won the ice dance championship title in 1949.)
1950–51	Sydney	Ann MacGillicuddy; Adrian Swan	Margaret Sim; Alan Glen	Phyllis Lammey; Hilton Omerod	
1951–52	Melbourne	Ann MacGillicuddy; William Taylor	No other competitors		
1952–53	Sydney	Margaret Sim; Allan Glen	No other competitors		
1953–54	Melbourne	Gloria Gray; Allan Glen	Margaret Sim; Hilton Omerod	No other competitors	
1954–55	Sydney	Linda Squires; Robert Watson	(No records found)		(Note: Linda Squires and Robert Watson won the ice dance championship title in 1949.)
1955–56	Melbourne	Barbara Heyward; Douglas Clarke	(No records found)		(Note: Barbara Heyward and Douglas Clarke won the ice dance championship titles in 1955 to 1958.)
1956–57	Melbourne	Barbara Heyward; Douglas Clarke	(No records found)		(Note: Barbara Heyward and Douglas Clarke won the ice dance championship titles in 1955 to 1958.)
1957–58	(No record found)	Barbara Heyward; Douglas Clarke	(No records found)		(Note: Barbara Heyward and Douglas Clarke won the ice dance championship titles in 1955 to 1958.)
1958–59	Melbourne	Barbara Heyward; Douglas Clarke	(No records found)		(Note: Barbara Heyward and Douglas Clarke won the ice dance championship titles in 1955 to 1958.)
1959–60	Melbourne	Shirley Taylor; William Cherrell	(No records found)		(Note: Shirley Taylor and William Cherrell won the ice dance championship title in 1959.)
1960–61	(No record found)	No ice dance champions			
1961–62	Sydney	Lynn Wright; Robert Watson	(No records found)		(Note: Lynn Wright and Robert Watson won the ice dance championship title in 1961.)
1962–64	No ice dance competitors				
1964–65	(No records found)	A. Clacy; B. Hodge	(No records found)		(Note: A. Clacy and B. Hodge won the ice dance championship title in 1964.)
1965–66	(No records found)	Edwina Slowman; William Hewison	(No record found)	Lesley Anderson; Leslie Coxon	
1966–67	(No records found)	No ice dance champions			
1967–70	No ice dance competitors				
1970–71	Melbourne	Lorryn Sorrenson; Graham Beaumont	Lorraine Champman; Bernie Lewis	No other competitors	
1971–72	Melbourne	Joan Coates; Graham Beaumont	Janet Neale; John Haggett	Lorraine Champman; Bernie Lewis	
1972–73	Brisbane	Joan Coates; Graham Beaumont	Janet Neale; Gabriel Somlai	Margaret Doolan; Frank Chiementon	
1973–74	Sydney	No ice dance competitors			
1974–75	Melbourne	Anne Zoe Hopkins; Gabriel Somlai	Dorothy Smith; Grant Goddard	No other competitors	
1975–76	Sydney	Dorothy Smith; Grant Goddard	No other competitors		
1976–79	No ice dance competitors				
1979–80	Melbourne	Kim Pargeter; Chris Stuart	Helen Brown; Unknown	Ann Brenock-Trainter; Allan Brenock	
1980–81	(No record found)	Brennice Coates; Leslie Boroczky	(No records found)		(Note: Brennice Coates and Leslie Boroczky won the ice dance championship title in 1980.)
1981–82	Brisbane	P. Leedham; Leslie Boroczky	(No records found)		(Note: P. Leedham and Leslie Boroczky won the ice dance championship title in 1981.)
1982–83	Sydney	Bridget Watson; Mark Hochmann	No other competitors		
1983–84	Perth	Liane Telling; Michael Fisher	Joanne Crynes; Chris Stuart	No other competitors	
1984–85	Brisbane	Liane Telling; Michael Fisher	(No records found)		(Note: Liane Telling and Michael Fisher won the ice dance championship title in 1984.)
1985–86	Melbourne	Monica MacDonald; Rodney Clarke	(No records found)		(Note: Monica MacDonald and Rodney Clarke won the ice dance championship titles from 1985 to 1987.)
1986–87	Brisbane	Monica MacDonald; Rodney Clarke	(No records found)		(Note: Monica MacDonald and Rodney Clarke won the ice dance championship titles from 1985 to 1987.)
1987–88	Brisbane	Monica MacDonald; Rodney Clarke	(No records found)		(Note: Monica MacDonald and Rodney Clarke won the ice dance championship titles from 1985 to 1987.)
1988–89	Sydney	Monica MacDonald; Rodney Clarke	Fiona Coulston; Brian Duckworth	(No record found)	
1989–90	Perth	Monica MacDonald; Duncan Smart	Fiona Coulston; Brian Duckworth	(No record found)	(Note: Monica MacDonald and Duncan Smart won the ice dance championship titles in 1989 and 1990.)
1990–91	Sydney	Monica MacDonald; Duncan Smart	(No records found)		(Note: Monica MacDonald and Duncan Smart won the ice dance championship titles in 1989 and 1990.)
1991–92	Canberra	Monica MacDonald; Duncan Smart	Amber Niv; Mark Storton	Louise Carracher; Brian Duckworth	
1992–93	Bendigo	Louise Carracher; Brian Duckworth	(No records found)		(Note: Louise Carracher and Brian Duckworth won the ice dance championship title in 1992.)
1993–94	Brisbane	Christine Seydel; Duncan Smart	Linda Peterson; John Dunlop	No other competitors	
1994–95	Sydney	Christine Seydel; Duncan Smart	(No records found)		(Note: Christine Seydel and Duncan Smart won the ice dance championship title in 1994.)
1995–96	Canberra	Chantal Loyer; Justin Bell	Christine Seydel; Duncan Smart	No other competitors	
1996–97	Perth	Chantal Loyer; Justin Bell	Christine Seydel; Duncan Smart	No other competitors	
1997–98	Sydney	Margarita Fourer; Timothy Heinecke	No other competitors		
1998–99	Melbourne	Danielle Rigg-Smith; Trent Nelson-Bond	Portia Duval; Francis Rigby	No other competitors	
1999–2000	Adelaide	Portia Duval; Francis Rigby	Danielle Rigg-Smith; Trent Nelson-Bond	No other competitors	
2000–01	Perth	Portia Duval; Francis Rigby	Rebecca Khoo; Evgeni Borounov	Natalie Buck; Trent Nelson-Bond	
2001–02	Sydney	Rebecca Khoo; Evgeni Borounov	Natalie Buck; Trent Nelson-Bond	Aimee Hartog; Daniel Price	
2002–03	Brisbane	Natalie Buck; Trent Nelson-Bond	Danika Bourne; Alexander Pavlov	No other competitors	
2003–04	Brisbane	Natalie Buck; Trent Nelson-Bond	Danika Bourne; Alexander Pavlov	No other competitors	
2004–05	Sydney	Natalie Buck; Trent Nelson-Bond	Danika Bourne; Alexander Pavlov	No other competitors	
2005–06	Perth	Natalie Buck; Trent Nelson-Bond	Maria Borounov; Evgeni Borounov	No other competitors	
2006–07	Brisbane	Maria Borounov; Evgeni Borounov	No other competitors		
2007–08	Lake Macquarie	Danielle O'Brien; Gregory Merriman	(Canada); Katrina Reyes; Spencer Barnes; (Canada)	No other competitors	
2008–09	Brisbane	Danielle O'Brien; Gregory Merriman	Maria Borounov; Evgeni Borounov	No other competitors	
2009–10	Sydney	Danielle O'Brien; Gregory Merriman	Maria Borounov; Evgeni Borounov	No other competitors	
2010–11	Melbourne	Danielle O'Brien; Gregory Merriman	Maria Borounov; Evgeni Borounov	Katherine Firkin; Henri Du Pont	
2011–12	Brisbane	Danielle O'Brien; Gregory Merriman	Katherine Firkin; Henri Du Pont	No other competitors	
2012–13	Brisbane	Danielle O'Brien; Gregory Merriman	(New Zealand); Ayesha Campbell; Shane Speden; (New Zealand)	Katherine Firkin; Henri Du Pont	
2013–14	Melbourne	Danielle O'Brien; Gregory Merriman	(New Zealand); Ayesha Campbell; Shane Speden; (New Zealand)	Adele Morrison; Lochran Doherty	
2014–15	Brisbane	Adele Morrison; Shane Speden	No other competitors		
2015–16	Sydney	Emily Pike; Patrick Adderly	No other competitors		
2016–17	Melbourne	Matilda Friend; William Badaoui	Adele Morrison; Demid Rokachev	Kimberley Hew-Low; Timothy McKernan	
2017–18	Brisbane	Chantelle Kerry; Andrew Dodds	Micol Carmignani; Mitchell Frencham	No other competitors	
2018–19	Sydney	Chantelle Kerry; Andrew Dodds	Matilda Friend; William Badaoui	India Nette; Eron Westwood	
2019–20	Melbourne	Holly Harris; Jason Chan	Chantelle Kerry; Andrew Dodds	Matilda Friend; William Badaoui	
2020–21	Brisbane	Competitions cancelled due to the COVID-19 pandemic			
2021–22	Brisbane	Competitions cancelled due to the COVID-19 pandemic			
2022–23	Brisbane	India Nette; Eron Westwood	No other competitors		
2023–24	Erina	Romy Malcolm; Kobi Chant	No other competitors		
2024–25	Melbourne	Holly Harris; Jason Chan	Romy Malcolm; Kobi Chant	Samantha Udell; Zach Churton	
2025–26	Brisbane	No ice dance competitors			

=== Synchronized skating ===
While championship competitions were held in synchronized skating (also known as precision skating) prior to 2005, this is earliest for which full results have been documented.

Senior synchronized event medalists
Season	Location	Gold	Silver	Bronze	Ref.
2005–06	Perth	Fire on Ice	Ice Viva!	No other competitors	
2006–07	Brisbane	Fire on Ice	Synergy	Adelaide Ice Magic	
2007–08	Lake Macquarie	Fire on Ice	Adelaide Ice Magic	No other competitors	
2008–09	Brisbane	Fire on Ice	Adelaide Ice Magic	No other competitors	
2009–10	Sydney	Fire on Ice	Adelaide Ice Magic	No other competitors	
2010–11	Melbourne	Fire on Ice	Nova	Adelaide Ice Magic	
2011–12	Brisbane	Fire on Ice	Nova	Adelaide Ice Magic	
2012–13	Brisbane	Nova	Fire on Ice	Adelaide Ice Magic	
2013–14	Melbourne	Nova	Infusion	Fire on Ice	
2014–15	Brisbane	Infusion	Fire on Ice	Nova	
2015–16	Sydney	Nova	Fire on Ice	Infusion	
2016–17	Melbourne	Infusion	Nova	Ice Storm	
2017–18	Brisbane	Team Unity	Ice Storm	Nova	
2018–19	Sydney	Team Unity	Ice Storm	Nova	
2019–20	Melbourne	Team Unity	Ice Storm	Nova	
2020–21	Brisbane	Competitions cancelled due to the COVID-19 pandemic			
2021–22	Brisbane	Competitions cancelled due to the COVID-19 pandemic			
2022–23	Brisbane	Team Unity	Ice Storm	Nova	
2023–24	Erina	Team Unity	Ice Storm Lightning	Infusion	
2024–25	Melbourne	Team Unity	Ice Storm	Infusion	
2025–26	Brisbane	Team Unity	Ice Storm	No other competitors	

== Junior medalists ==
While junior-level championships were held in Australia prior to 1995, this is earliest for which full results have been documented.

=== Men's singles ===
Junior men's event medalists
Season	Location	Gold	Silver	Bronze	Ref.
1995–96	Canberra	Michael Amentas	Terence Lyness	A. Botham	
1996–97	Perth	Michael Amentas	Peter Nicholas	Dejan Jovanovic	
1997–98	Sydney	Michael Amentas	Peter Nicholas	Stuart Beckingham	
1998–99	Melbourne	Peter Nicholas	Daniel Harries	Lloyd Tucker	
1999–2000	Adelaide	Peter Nicholas	Lloyd Tucker	Bradley Santer	
2000–01	Perth	Bradley Santer	Daniel Harries	Sean Carlow	
2001–02	Sydney	Daniel Harries	Lloyd Tucker	Sean Carlow	
2002–03	Brisbane	Sean Carlow	Tristan Thode (New Zealand)	Joel Watson (New Zealand)	
2003–04	Brisbane	Joel Watson (New Zealand) (Note: Joel Watson was not named the Australian junior champion, because he was a guest skater from New Zealand.)	Sean Carlow (Note: Sean Carlow was named the Australian junior champion, because Joel Watson, the first-place finisher, was a guest skater from New Zealand.)	Robert McNamara	
2004–05	Sydney	Joel Watson (New Zealand)	Robert McNamara (Note: Robert McNamara was named the Australian junior champion, because Joel Watson, the first-place finisher, was a guest skater from New Zealand.)	Mitchell Chapman	
2005–06	Perth	Robert McNamara	Mitchell Chapman	Dean Timmins	
2006–07	Brisbane	Nicholas Fernandez	Robert McNamara	Mark Webster	
2007–08	Lake Macquarie	Matthew Precious	Mark Webster	Mathew Tinson	
2008–09	Brisbane	Matthew Precious	Brendan Kerry	Cameron Hems (New Zealand)	
2009–10	Sydney	Brendan Kerry	Simon Hardy	David Kranjec	
2010–11	Melbourne	Brendan Kerry	Oliver Porter	David Kranjec	
2011–12	Brisbane	Jordan Dodds	David Kranjec	Harley Windsor	
2012–13	Brisbane	Cameron Hemmert	Darian Kaptich	Ryan Dodds	
2013–14	Melbourne	Darian Kaptich	Charlton Doherty	Ryan Dodds	
2014–15	Brisbane	James Min	Darian Kaptich	Charlton Doherty	
2015–16	Sydney	James Min	Charlton Doherty	Darian Kaptich	
2016–17	Melbourne	James Min	Darian Kaptich	Charlton Doherty	
2017–18	Brisbane	Darian Kaptich	Harrison Bain	Brian Lee	
2018–19	Sydney	Darian Kaptich	Sam Gillard	Alex Sun	
2019–20	Melbourne	Juan Camilo Yusti	Callum Bradshaw	Leon McIntosh	
2020–21	Brisbane	Competitions cancelled due to the COVID-19 pandemic			
2021–22	Brisbane	Competitions cancelled due to the COVID-19 pandemic			
2022–23	Brisbane	Julio Potapenko	Vinceman Chong	Jeremy Adamlu	
2023–24	Erina	Vinceman Chong	Kryshtof Pradeaux	James Lin	
2024–25	Melbourne	Vinceman Chong	James Lin	Rahul Ravindran	
2025–26	Brisbane	Vinceman Chong	Rahul Ravindran	Henry Green	

=== Women's singles ===
Junior women's event medalists
Season	Location	Gold	Silver	Bronze	Ref.
1995–96	Canberra	Joanne Carter	Katie Murphy	Stephanie Zhang	
1996–97	Perth	Joanne Carter	Michelle Kriz	Emily Minns	
1997–98	Sydney	Michelle Kriz	Andrea Boss	Michelle Pascoe	
1998–99	Melbourne	Stephanie Zhang	Olivia Masterton	Sarah-Yvonne Prytula	
1999–2000	Adelaide	Stephanie Zhang	Andrea Boss	Sarah-Yvonne Prytula	
2000–01	Perth	Stephanie Zhang	Zoe Bradforth	Claire Bilton	
2001–02	Sydney	Stephanie Zhang	Zoe Bradforth	Vashti Lonsdale	
2002–03	Brisbane	Stephanie Zhang	Emilia Ahsan	Alix Myra Andersen	
2003–04	Brisbane	Emilia Ahsan	Janna Kupec	Tessa Black	
2004–05	Sydney	Phoebe Di Tommaso	Laura Downing	Janna Kupec	
2005–06	Perth	Tina Wang	Janna Kupec	Laura Downing	
2006–07	Brisbane	Tina Wang	Cheltzie Lee	Phoebe Di Tommaso	
2007–08	Lake Macquarie	Cheltzie Lee	Alexandra Rout (New Zealand)	Lauren Hansom	
2008–09	Brisbane	Alexandra Rout (New Zealand) (Note: Jaimee Nobbs was named the Australian junior champion, because Alexandra Rout, the first-place finisher, was a guest skater from New Zealand.)	Jaimee Nobbs	Albrina Lee	
2009–10	Sydney	Jaimee Nobbs	Chantelle Kerry	Zara Pasfield	
2010–11	Melbourne	Chantelle Kerry	Brooklee Han	Jaimee Nobbs	
2011–12	Brisbane	Chantelle Kerry	Taylor Dean	Zara Pasfield	
2012–13	Brisbane	Kailani Craine	Madelaine Parker (New Zealand)	Jenny Lu	
2013–14	Melbourne	Kailani Craine	Jenny Lu	Yancey Chan	
2014–15	Brisbane	Kailani Craine	Amelia Jackson	Renee Hambly	
2015–16	Sydney	Kailani Craine	Amelia Jackson	Katie Pasfield	
2016–17	Melbourne	Holly Harris	Jordan Lazarus	Amelia Jackson	
2017–18	Brisbane	Amelia Jackson	Jordan Lazarus	Lucy Sori Yun	
2018–19	Sydney	Amelia Jackson	Lucy Sori Yun	Danielle Gebser	
2019–20	Melbourne	Victoria Alcantara	Vlada Vasilev	Amy Avtarovski	
2020–21	Brisbane	Competitions cancelled due to the COVID-19 pandemic			
2021–22	Brisbane	Competitions cancelled due to the COVID-19 pandemic			
2022–23	Brisbane	Hana Bath	Luna Shimogaki	Sienna Kaczmarczyk	
2023–24	Erina	Hana Bath	Trisha Tong	Sienna Kaczmarczyk	
2024–25	Melbourne	Hana Bath	Mia Zixuan Jeng	Kalyn Shimogaki	
2025–26	Brisbane	Mia Zeng	Kalyn Shimogaki	Angela Guo	

=== Pairs ===
Junior pairs' event medalists
Season	Location	Gold	Silver	Bronze	Ref.
1995–96	Canberra	Emily Minns; Terence Lyness	No other competitors		
1996–98	No junior pairs competitors				
1998–99	Melbourne	Bethany McLean; Adam King	No other competitors		
1999–2000	Adelaide	Amanda Paton; Adam King	Margaret Albia; Phillip Champion	No other competitors	
2000–02	No junior pairs competitors				
2002–03	Brisbane	Krysia Child; Aaron Botham	No other competitors		
2003–08	No junior pairs competitors				
2008–09	Brisbane	(New Zealand); Morgan Figgins; Grant Howie; (New Zealand) (Note: Morgan Figgins and Grant Howie were not named the Australian junior champions, because they were guest skaters from New Zealand.)	No other competitors		
2009–11	No junior pairs competitors				
2011–12	Brisbane	Veera Kestila; Callum Bullard	Emma Greensill; Matthew Dodds	No other competitors	
2012–13	Brisbane	Eliza Smyth; Jordan Dodds	No other competitors		
2013–14	Melbourne	Eliza Smyth; Jordan Dodds	No other competitors		
2014–15	Brisbane	Eliza Smyth; Jordan Dodds	No other competitors		
2015–16	Sydney	Jessica Rotondo; Ryan Dodds	No other competitors		
2016–17	Melbourne	Jessica Rotondo; Ryan Dodds	No other competitors		
2017–18	Brisbane	Kaitlyn Ineson; Tremayne Bevan	No other competitors		
2018–19	Sydney	No junior pairs competitors			
2019–20	Melbourne	Campbell Young; Tremayne Bevan	No other competitors		
2020–21	Brisbane	Competitions cancelled due to the COVID-19 pandemic			
2021–22	Brisbane	Competitions cancelled due to the COVID-19 pandemic			
2022–23	Brisbane	No junior pairs competitors			
2023–24	Erina	Peyton Bellamy Martins; Kryshtof Pradeaux	No other competitors		
2024–26	No junior pairs competitors				

=== Ice dance ===
Junior ice dance event medalists
Season	Location	Gold	Silver	Bronze	Ref.
1995–96	Canberra	Margarita Fourer; Timothy Heinecke	Krystal Lee; Francis Rigby	(New Zealand); Kirsty MacDonald; Christopher Street; (New Zealand)	
1996–97	Perth	Lindsay Gough; Jarrod Cook	Alanna Tabone; Ben Symons	Portia Duval; Francis Rigby	
1997–98	Sydney	Lindsay Gough; Jarrod Cook	Rebecca Khoo; Mathew Lee	Danielle Rigg-Smith; Trent Nelson-Bond	
1998–99	Melbourne	Rebecca Khoo; Mathew Lee	Danika Bourne; Trevor Sieders	No other competitors	
1999–2000	Adelaide	Alexandra Martin; Daniel Price	No other competitors		
2000–01	Perth	No junior ice dance competitors			
2001–02	Sydney	Sarah Vandenbos; Sean Murray	No other competitors		
2002–03	Brisbane	No junior ice dance competitors			
2003–04	Brisbane	Gabrielle Biffin; Tye Nagy	Danielle O'Brien; Gregory Merriman	No other competitors	
2004–05	Sydney	Danielle O'Brien; Gregory Merriman	No other competitors		
2005–06	Perth	Danielle O'Brien; Gregory Merriman	Annabelle Tickner; Kent Caputo	No other competitors	
2006–07	Brisbane	Danielle O'Brien; Gregory Merriman	No other competitors		
2007–09	No junior ice dance competitors				
2009–10	Sydney	(New Zealand); Ayesha Campbell; Shane Speden; (New Zealand) (Note: Ayesha Campbell and Shane Speden were not named the Australian junior champions, because they were guest skaters from New Zealand.)	Lisa Phillips; Andrew Budd; (Note: Lisa Phillips and Andrew Budd were named the Australian junior champions, because Ayesha Campbell and Shane Speden, the first-place finishers, were guest skaters from New Zealand.)	No other competitors	
2010–11	Melbourne	(New Zealand); Ayesha Campbell; Shane Speden; (New Zealand)	Kimberley Hew-Low; Cameron Hemmert; (Note: Kimberley Hew-Low and Cameron Hemmert were named the Australian junior champions, because Ayesha Campbell and Shane Speden, the first-place finishers, were guest skaters from New Zealand.)	No other competitors	
2011–12	Brisbane	Matilda Friend; Patrick Adderley	Hannah Sparke; Lochran Doherty	No other competitors	
2012–13	Brisbane	Matilda Friend; Patrick Adderley	Rhiarna Lagoutaris; Thomas Masters	No other competitors	
2013–14	Melbourne	Rhiarna Lagoutaris; Thomas Masters	No other competitors		
2014–15	Brisbane	Matilda Friend; William Badaoui	Emily Pike; Patrick Adderley	Anja Noetzel-Hayward; Connor McIver	
2015–16	Sydney	Matilda Friend; William Badaoui	Jessica Palfreyman; Charlton Doherty	Courtney Tyerman; Alex Anstey	
2016–17	Melbourne	Anastasia Ozerova; Nick McCreary	Jessica Palfreyman; Charlton Doherty	Courtney Tyerman; Beau McElroy	
2017–18	Brisbane	Jessica Palfreyman; Charlton Doherty	Varshana Schelling; Liam McIver	No other competitors	
2018–19	Sydney	Matilda Friend; William Badaoui	Jessica Palfreyman; Nicholas McCreary	Brittany Ross; Jake Meyer	
2019–20	Melbourne	Alexandra Fladun-Dorling; Christopher Fladun-Dorling	No other competitors		
2020–21	Brisbane	Competitions cancelled due to the COVID-19 pandemic			
2021–22	Brisbane	Competitions cancelled due to the COVID-19 pandemic			
2022–23	Brisbane	No junior ice dance competitors			
2023–24	Erina	Renee Yuen; Oliver Ma	Regina Ng; Dominik Mautner	Amy Avtarovski; Charlie Wilcox	
2024–25	Melbourne	Renee Yuen; Oliver Ma	Chanelle Chum; Osckar Chum	No other competitors	
2025–26	Brisbane	No junior ice dance competitors			

=== Synchronized skating ===
Junior synchronized event medalists
Season	Location	Gold	Silver	Bronze	Ref.
2005–06	Perth	Adelaide Ice Magic	Iceskateers Elite	Penrith Ice Crystals	
2006–07	Brisbane	Iceskateers Elite	Fire on Ice Junior	Macquarie Illusions	
2007–08	Lake Macquarie	Fire on Ice Junior	Iceskateers Elite	Macquarie Illusions	
2008–09	Brisbane	Fire on Ice Junior	Iceskateers Elite	Nova	
2009–10	Sydney	Nova	Iceskateers Elite	Infusion	
2010–11	Melbourne	Iceskateers Elite	Infusion	Fire on Ice Junior	
2011–12	Brisbane	Fire on Ice Junior	Majestic Ice	Iceskateers Elite	
2012–13	Brisbane	Iceskateers Elite	Majestic Ice	Fire on Ice Junior	
2013–14	Melbourne	Iceskateers Elite	Majestic Ice	Fire on Ice Junior	
2014–15	Brisbane	Iceskateers Elite	Majestic Ice	Aurora	
2015–16	Sydney	Iceskateers Elite	Majestic Ice	No other competitors	
2016–17	Melbourne	Majestic Ice	Iceskateers Elite	Infusion	
2017–18	Brisbane	Majestic Ice	Iceskateers Elite	Infusion	
2018–19	Sydney	Iceskateers Elite	Infusion	Majestic Ice	
2019–20	Melbourne	Iceskateers Elite	Majestic Ice Junior	Adelaide Ice Magic Junior	
2020–21	Brisbane	Competitions cancelled due to the COVID-19 pandemic			
2021–22	Brisbane	Competitions cancelled due to the COVID-19 pandemic			
2022–23	Brisbane	Majestic Ice Junior	Infusion Junior	Iceskateers Elite	
2023–24	Erina	Majestic Ice Junior	Iceskateers Elite	Southern Sky Junior	
2024–25	Melbourne	Southern Sky Junior	Majestic Ice Junior	Phoenix	
2025–26	Brisbane	Southern Sky Junior	Iceskateers Elite	Majestic Ice Junior	

== Records ==
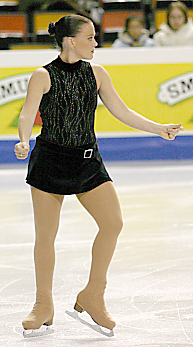
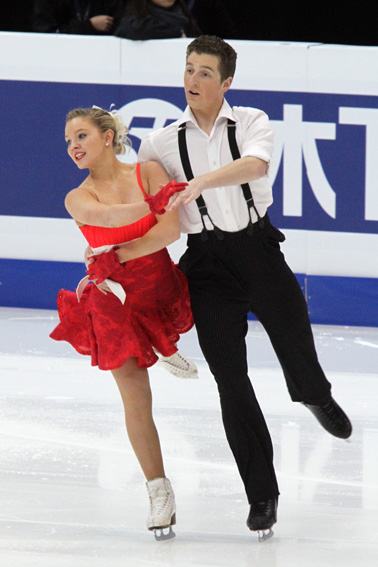
From left to right: Joanne Carter won seven Australian Championship titles in women's singles; while Danielle O'Brien and Gregory Merriman won six Australian Championship titles in ice dance.

Records
Discipline	Most championship titles			
Discipline	Skater(s)	No.	Years	Ref.
Men's singles	Brendan Kerry	8	2011/12; 2013/14 – 2019/20	
Men's singles	Cameron Medhurst	8	1982/83; 1984/85 – 1990/91	
Women's singles	Joanne Carter	7	1994/95 – 1998/99; 2006/07 – 2007/08	
Pairs	Danielle Carr; Stephen Carr	19	1980/81 – 1998/99	
Ice dance	Danielle O'Brien; Gregory Merriman	7	2007/08 – 2013/14	
