= 2010–11 Australian Figure Skating Championships =

Figure skating competition

- Type: National Championship
- Date: November 25 – December 3, 2010
- Season: 2010–11
- Location: Melbourne
- Venue: Icehouse Melbourne

Champions
- Men's singles: Mark Webster
- Ladies' singles: Phoebe Di Tommaso
- Ice dance: Danielle O'Brien / Gregory Merriman
- Synchronized skating: Fire on Ice
- Previous: 2009–10 Australian Championships
- Next: 2011–12 Australian Championships

The 2010–11 Australian Figure Skating Championships was held in Melbourne from 25 November through 3 December 2010. Skaters competed in the disciplines of men's singles, ladies' singles, ice dancing, and synchronized skating across many levels, including senior, junior, novice, adult, and the pre-novice disciplines of primary and intermediate.

== Senior results ==
=== Men's singles ===
Rank	Name	Total points	SP		FS	
1	Mark Webster	152.19	1	52.00	1	100.19
2	Robert McNamara	128.91	4	37.84	2	91.07
3	Mitchell Chapman	121.90	2	44.21	3	77.69
–	(New Zealand) Cameron Hems	110.37	6	35.02	4	75.35
4	Andrew Dodds	109.84	5	35.79	5	74.05
5	Brad McLaughlan	103.44	3	40.39	7	63.05
6	Matthew Dodds	96.81	7	32.96	6	63.85

=== Ladies ===
Rank	Name	Total points	SP		FS	
1	Phoebe Di Tommaso	108.03	1	37.25	1	70.78
2	Albrina Lee	99.16	3	31.70	2	67.46
3	Jessica Kurzawski	98.18	2	36.38	3	61.80
–	(Kazakhstan) Aigul Kozhamkulova	75.15	4	28.29	5	52.96
–	(New Zealand) Samantha Waugh	81.23	6	24.06	4	57.17
4	Kayla Doig	73.41	5	27.12	6	46.29
–	(New Zealand) Melissa Morris	62.87	7	20.51	7	42.36

=== Ice dance ===
Rank	Name	Total points	SD		FD	
1	Danielle O'Brien / Gregory Merriman	117.82	1	46.86	1	70.96
2	Maria Borounov / Evgueni Borounov	86.16	2	28.14	2	58.02
3	Katherine Firkin / Henri Du Pont	59.98	3	18.89	3	41.09

=== Synchronized skating ===
Rank	Name	Total points	SD		FD	
1	Fire on Ice	100.15	1	33.07	1	67.08
2	Nova	90.36	3	28.29	2	62.07
3	Adelaide Ice Magic	88.25	2	31.86	3	56.39
