= 2013–14 Australian Figure Skating Championships =

Figure skating competition

- Type: National Championships
- Date: November 30 – December 6, 2013
- Season: 2013–14
- Location: Melbourne
- Venue: Medibank Icehouse

Champions
- Men's singles: Brendan Kerry
- Ladies' singles: Brooklee Han
- Pairs: Paris Stephens / Matthew Dodds
- Ice dance: Danielle O'Brien / Gregory Merriman
- Synchronized skating: Nova
- Previous: 2012–13 Australian Championships
- Next: 2014–15 Australian Championships

The 2013–14 Australian Figure Skating Championships was held in Melbourne from 30 November through 6 December 2013. Skaters competed in the disciplines of men's singles, ladies' singles, pair skating, ice dancing, and synchronized skating across many levels, including senior, junior, novice, intermediate, and primary divisions.

== Senior results ==
=== Men ===
Rank	Name	Total points	SP		FS	
1	Brendan Kerry	179.33	2	60.89	1	118.44
2	David Kranjec	173.83	1	61.31	2	112.52
3	Mark Webster	156.62	3	54.64	4	101.98
4	Andrew Dodds	149.59	4	47.09	3	102.50
5	Cameron Hemmert	134.15	6	42.72	5	91.43
6	Jordan Dodds	133.24	5	44.49	6	88.75
7	Matthew Dodds	86.54	7	30.47	7	56.07

=== Ladies ===
Rank	Name	Total points	SP		FS	
1	Brooklee Han	161.42	1	58.61	1	102.81
2	Taylor Dean	99.12	2	31.64	2	67.48
3	Jaimee Nobbs	89.47	4	28.12	3	61.35
4	Jessinta Martin	86.96	3	29.03	4	57.93
5	Karuna Henderson	79.57	5	27.95	5	51.62
6	Sarah Cullen	76.73	7	25.70	6	51.03
7	Harmonie Wong	72.35	6	26.78	7	45.57
8	Lowanna Gibson	47.77	8	16.28	8	31.49
WD	Chantelle Kerry					

=== Pairs ===
Rank	Name	Total points	SP		FS	
1	Paris Stephens / Matthew Dodds	106.47	1	39.17	1	67.30

=== Ice dancing ===
Rank	Name	Region	Total points	SD		FD	
1	Danielle O'Brien / Gregory Merriman	NSW	145.97	1	58.03	1	87.94
–	Ayesha Campbell / Shane Speden	New Zealand	95.92	2	35.07	2	60.85
2	Adele Morrison / Lochran Doherty	QLD	70.10	3	24.14	3	45.96

=== Synchronized ===
Rank	Name	Total points	SP		FS	
1	Nova	108.67	1	32.48	1	76.19
2	Infusion	92.18	2	29.72	2	62.46
3	Fire on Ice	88.54	3	29.69	4	58.85
4	Ice Storm	84.91	4	25.72	3	59.19
