= 2012–13 Australian Figure Skating Championships =

Figure skating competition

- Type: National Championships
- Date: December 1 – 7, 2012
- Season: 2012–13
- Location: Brisbane
- Host: Ice Skating Queensland
- Venue: Iceworld Boondall

Champions
- Men's singles: David Kranjec
- Ladies' singles: Chantelle Kerry
- Pairs: Emma Greensill / Matthew Dodds
- Ice dance: Danielle O'Brien / Gregory Merriman
- Synchronized skating: Nova
- Previous: 2011–12 Australian Championships
- Next: 2013–14 Australian Championships

The 2012–13 Australian Figure Skating Championships was held in Brisbane from 1 through 7 December 2012. Skaters competed in the disciplines of men's singles, ladies' singles, pair skating, ice dancing, and synchronized skating across many levels, including senior, junior, novice, intermediate, and primary divisions.

== Senior results ==
=== Men ===
Rank	Name	Region	Total points	SP		FS	
1	David Kranjec	QLD	154.96	2	50.85	1	104.11
2	Brendan Kerry	NSW	140.84	1	54.98	5	85.86
3	Jordan Dodds	QLD	132.45	3	45.28	3	87.17
4	Mitchell Chapman	QLD	129.50	5	40.43	2	89.07
5	Andrew Dodds	QLD	129.16	4	42.63	4	86.53
6	Lochran Doherty	QLD	99.25	7	27.58	6	71.67
7	Brad McLachlan	NSW	93.48	6	31.53	7	61.95
8	Matthew Dodds	QLD	81.43	8	26.23	8	55.20

=== Ladies ===
Rank	Name	Region	Total points	SP		FS	
1	Chantelle Kerry	NSW	114.93	1	42.18	1	72.75
2	Brooklee Han	VIC	97.42	2	41.35	5	56.07
3	Stephanie Zhang	NSW	96.19	3	37.29	4	58.90
4	Taylor Dean	QLD	94.32	5	27.86	2	66.46
5	Jaimee Nobbs	WA	93.44	4	32.25	3	61.19
6	Jessinta Martin	SA	76.77	6	26.85	6	49.92
7	Kayla Doig	QLD	70.53	7	26.03	9	44.50
8	Sarah Cullen	NSW	70.12	8	23.84	8	46.28
9	Karuna Henderson	ACT	69.63	9	21.70	7	47.93
10	Lowanna Gibson	NSW	40.17	10	15.26	10	24.91

=== Pairs ===
Rank	Name	Region	Total points	SP		FS	
1	Emma Greensill / Matthew Dodds	QLD	72.51	1	26.62	1	45.89

=== Ice dancing ===
Rank	Name	Region	Total points	SD		FD	
1	Danielle O'Brien / Gregory Merriman	NSW	124.38	1	45.17	1	79.21
–	Ayesha Campbell / Shane Speden	New Zealand	59.91	3	21.78	2	38.13
2	Katherine Firkin / Henri Du Pont	VIC	48.52	2	23.20	3	25.32

=== Synchronized ===
Rank	Name	Region	Total points	SP		FS	
1	Nova	QLD	107.15	1	34.22	1	72.93
2	Fire on Ice	NSW	93.33	2	32.93	2	60.40
3	Adelaide Ice Magic	SA	73.71	3	24.67	3	49.04
4	Infusion	WA	69.87	4	24.57	4	45.30
