= Katie Pasfield =

Australian figure skater (born 1998)

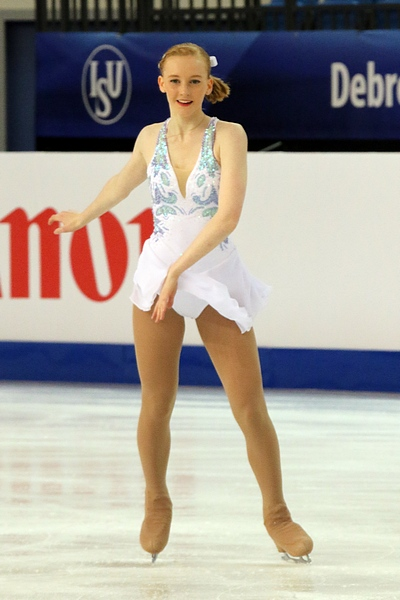

Personal information
- Born: 25 August 1998 (age 27) Sydney
- Home town: Sydney
- Height: 1.68 m (5 ft 6 in)

Figure skating career
- Country: Australia
- Coach: Michael Pasfield; Kylie Fennel
- Skating club: Macquarie ISC
- Began skating: 2005

Katie Pasfield (born 25 August 1998) is an Australian figure skater. She is the 2018 Reykjavik International silver medalist, and a two-time Australian national bronze medalist (2017, 2018).

On the junior level, she is the 2016 FBMA Trophy silver medalist, the 2014 Skate Down Under silver medalist and a two-time Australian junior national bronze medalist (2012, 2015).

== Personal life ==
Pasfield is the daughter of Michael Pasfield, a former competitive figure skater, and sister of Zara Pasfield, who is the 2012 Australian ladies' champion.

Pasfield graduated from Pymble Ladies' College in 2016. She later completed a Bachelor of Veterinary Biology/ Doctor of Veterinary Medicine at Sydney University in 2022. She currently works as a veterinarian in Canberra.

=== Competitive highlights ===
International
Event	12–13	13–14	14–15	15–16	16–17	17–18	18–19
Four Continents				21st			
CS U.S. Classic							14th
Reykjavik International						2nd	
Slovenia Open						16th	
International: Junior
Junior Worlds				35th			
JGP Austria				18th			
JGP Latvia						21st	
Asian Open				8th			
Bavarian Open			16th				
Coupe du Printemps		20th					
FBMA Trophy				2nd			
Int. Challenge Cup			19th				
Jégvirág Cup			5th				
Skate Down Under			2nd				
National
Australian Champ.				4th	3rd	3rd	WD
Australian Junior Champ.	4th J	6th J	6th J	3rd J			
J = Junior level; WD = Withdrew
