= Mary Wilson (figure skater) =

Australian figure skater (1940–2024)

Personal information
- Born: Mary Lynette Wilson; 22 March 1940
- Died: 2 May 2024 (aged 84)

Figure skating career
- Country: Australia
- Coach: Nancy Burley

Mary Lynette Wilson (22 March 1940 – 2 May 2024) was an Australian competitive figure skater. She represented Australia at the 1960 Winter Olympics.

Wilson and her 1960 Olympic teammate Aileen Shaw were coached in Melbourne by Nancy Burley, who had competed for Australia at the 1952 Winter Olympics.

At the Winter Olympics in Squaw Valley, California Wilson finished 26th (last) in both the compulsory figures and free skating components.
