= 2011–12 Australian Figure Skating Championships =

Figure skating competition

- Type: National Championships
- Date: December 2 – 10, 2011
- Season: 2011–12
- Location: Brisbane
- Host: Ice Skating Queensland
- Venue: Iceworld Boondall

Champions
- Men's singles: Brenden Kerry (S); Jordan Dodds (J); Darian Kaptich (N)
- Ladies' singles: Zara Pasfield (S); Chantelle Kerry (J); Kirsten Hargreaves (N)
- Pairs: No Pair (S); Veera Kestila / Callum Bullard (J); Eliza Smyth / Jordan Dodds (N)
- Ice dance: Danielle O'Brien / Gregory Merriman (S); Matilda Friend / Patrick Adderley (J); No Dance Pair (N)
- Synchronized skating: Fire on Ice (S); Fire on Ice Junior (J); Iceskateers (N)
- Previous: 2010–11 Australian Championships
- Next: 2012–13 Australian Championships

The 2011–12 Australian Figure Skating Championships was held in Brisbane from 2 through 10 December 2011. Skaters competed in the disciplines of men's singles, ladies' singles, pair skating, ice dancing, and synchronized skating across many levels, including senior, junior, novice, Intermediate, and primary divisions.

== Senior results ==
=== Men's singles ===
Rank	Name	Total points	SP		FS	
1	Brendan Kerry	152.07	1	54.03	1	98.04
2	Nicholas Fernadez	147.95	2	52.58	2	95.37
3	Andrew Dodds	143.27	3	51.80	3	91.47
4	Mitchell Chapman	127.29	4	48.57	4	78.72
5	Blake Adams	110.93	6	36.39	5	74.54
6	Brad McLaughlan	104.72	5	39.21	7	65.51
7	Matthew Dodds	99.40	7	33.47	6	65.93

=== Women's singles ===
Rank	Name	Total points	SP		FS	
–	(Ukraine) Irina Movchan	123.50	1	47.76	1	75.74
1	Zara Pasfield	102.73	2	33.14	2	69.59
2	Jaimee Nobbs	92.60	3	32.81	4	59.79
3	Sydnee Knight	87.76	5	27.21	3	60.55
4	Karuna Hendersen	86.45	4	30.09	5	56.36
5	Kayla Doig	76.29	8	23.77	6	52.52
6	Jane Ashworth	73.73	6	25.52	7	48.21
–	(New Zealand) Millie Campbell	70.32	7	24.43	8	45.89
7	Rebecca Dellaca	66.88	10	21.32	9	45.56
8	Jacqueline Baranikova	61.41	9	21.54	10	39.87
9	Lowanna Gibson	51.36	11	19.96	11	31.40

=== Ice dancing ===
Rank	Name	Total points	SD		FD	
1	Danielle O'Brien / Gregory Merriman	128.20	1	52.67	1	75.53
2	Katherine Firkin / Henri Du Pont	64.75	2	25.32	2	39.43

=== Synchronized ===
Rank	Name	Total points	SP		FS	
1	Fire on Ice	105.65	3	34.56	1	71.09
2	Nova	103.37	1	36.10	2	67.27
3	Adelaide Ice Magic	93.16	2	34.60	3	58.56
4	Infusion	83.06	4	29.30	4	53.76
5	Ice Storm	73.26	5	26.70	5	46.56

== Junior results ==
=== Men's singles ===
Rank	Name	Total points	SP		FS	
1	Jordan Dodds	127.68	2	38.17	1	89.51
2	David Kranjec	123.83	1	44.20	2	79.63
3	Harley Dahlstrom	105.75	3	33.60	3	72.15
4	Alex Dillon	99.76	4	32.14	4	67.62

=== Women's singles ===
Rank	Name	Total points	SP		FS	
1	Chantelle Kerry	108.91	1	41.28	1	67.63
2	Taylor Dean	100.07	3	33.20	3	66.87
3	Zara Pasfield	98.79	4	31.61	2	67.18
4	Kailani Craine	97.19	2	35.03	4	62.16
–	Madelaine Parker	86.34	7	27.23	5	59.11
5	Sarah Cullen	81.58	5	28.28	6	53.30
–	Jessie Park	77.74	6	28.18	7	49.56
6	Eiland Kenyon	72.57	8	23.70	9	48.87
7	Renee Hambly	72.17	10	23.21	8	48.96
8	Guilia Marrama	70.76	9	23.37	10	47.39
9	Tanya Chamberlain	63.07	11	21.88	11	41.19
10	Rachel Caughley	59.36	12	19.00	12	40.36
11	Hayley Jeffries	56.52	13	17.30	13	39.22

=== Pair skating ===
Rank	Name	Total points	SP		FS	
1	Veera Kestila / Callum Bullard	100.27	1	31.44	1	68.83
2	Emma Greensill / Matthew Dodds	73.79	2	23.13	2	50.66

=== Ice dance ===
Rank	Name	Total points	SD		FD	
1	Matilda Friend / Patrick Adderley	85.47	1	34.63	1	50.84
–	(New Zealand) Ayesha Campbell / Shane Speden	81.40	2	30.82	2	50.58
2	Hannah Sparke / Lochran Doherty	50.34	3	23.30	3	27.04

=== Synchronized ===
Rank	Name	Total points	SP		FS	
1	Fire on Ice Junior	97.83	1	33.64	1	64.19
2	Majestic Ice Junior	86.33	2	30.25	2	56.08
3	Iceskateers Elite	80.24	3	29.61	4	50.63
4	Aurora	75.40	4	23.28	3	52.12

- 2011–12 Australian Figure Skating Championships results
