= 2018–19 Australian Figure Skating Championships =

Figure skating competition

2018 Australian Figure Skating Championships
- Type: National Championship
- Date: November 30 – December 7, 2018
- Season: 2018–19
- Location: Sydney, New South Wales
- Host: New South Wales Ice Skating Association
- Venue: Macquarie Ice Rink

Champions
- Men's singles: Brendan Kerry (S); Darian Kaptich (J)
- Ladies' singles: Kailani Craine (S); Amelia Jackson (J)
- Pairs: Ekaterina Alexandrovskaya / Harley Windsor (S)
- Ice dance: Chantelle Kerry / Andrew Dodds (S); Matilda Friend / William Badaoui (J)
- Synchronized skating: Team Unity (S); Iceskateers Elite (J)

The 2018 Australian Figure Skating Championships were held on November 30 – December 7, 2018, at the Macquarie Ice Rink in Sydney, New South Wales. Medals were awarded in the disciplines of men's singles, ladies' singles, pair skating, ice dance, and synchronized skating at the senior, junior, advanced novice, intermediate novice, and basic novice levels. The results were part of the selection criteria for the 2019 World Championships, the 2019 Four Continents Championships, and the 2019 World Junior Championships.

== Medals summary ==
=== Senior ===
Discipline	Gold	Silver	Bronze
Men	Brendan Kerry	Andrew Dodds	James Min
Women	Kailani Craine	Brooklee Han	Lucy Sori Yun
Pairs	Ekaterina Alexandrovskaya / Harley Windsor	No other competitors	
Ice dance	Chantelle Kerry / Andrew Dodds	Matilda Friend / William Badaoui	India Nette / Eron Westwood
Synchronized	Team Unity	Ice Storm	Nova

=== Junior ===
Discipline	Gold	Silver	Bronze
Men	Darian Kaptich	Sam Gillard	Alex Sun
Women	Amelia Jackson	Lucy Sori Yun	Romy Grogan
Pairs	No competitors		
Ice dance	Matilda Friend / William Badaoui	Jessica Palfreyman / Nicholas McCreary	Brittany Ross / Jake Meyer
Synchronized	Iceskateers	Majestic Ice	Infusion

== Senior results ==
=== Men's singles ===
Rank	Name	State	Total points	SP		FS	
1	Brendan Kerry	NSW	228.38	1	87.56	1	140.82
2	Andrew Dodds	QLD	194.21	3	66.19	2	128.02
3	James Min	SA	181.64	2	67.82	3	113.82
4	Jordan Dodds	QLD	170.96	4	58.01	4	112.95
5	Darian Kaptich	QLD	156.94	6	47.99	5	108.95
6	Charlton Doherty	QLD	137.89	7	47.02	6	90.87
WD	Mark Webster	NSW		5	50.33	withdrew	

=== Women's singles ===
Rank	Name	Total points	SP		FS	
1	Kailani Craine	178.33	1	64.10	1	114.23
2	Brooklee Han	163.60	2	54.31	2	109.29
3	Lucy Sori Yun	98.97	3	32.87	3	66.10
4	Ashley Colliver	94.40	6	29.57	4	64.83
5	Yancey Chan	93.66	4	31.12	5	62.54
6	Sarah Cullen	84.32	8	25.05	6	59.27
7	(United States) Cierra Nelson	82.63	5	30.60	8	52.03
8	(New Zealand) Sarah Bardua	79.85	7	27.30	7	52.55
9	Jennifer Toms	70.97	10	22.39	9	48.58
10	Deborah Toms	69.07	9	22.42	10	46.65

=== Pair skating ===
Rank	Name	Total points	SP		FS	
1	Ekaterina Alexandrovskaya / Harley Windsor	143.46	1	56.09	1	87.37

=== Ice dance ===
Rank	Name	Total points	RD		FD	
1	Chantelle Kerry / Andrew Dodds	160.40	1	59.91	1	100.49
2	Matilda Friend / William Badaoui	145.60	2	54.31	2	91.29
3	India Nette / Eron Westwood	93.29	3	33.02	3	60.27

=== Synchronized skating ===
Rank	Name	Total points	SP		FS	
1	Team Unity	141.44	1	47.56	2	93.88
2	Ice Storm	140.65	2	45.72	1	94.93
3	Nova	120.66	3	42.95	3	77.71

== Junior results ==
=== Men's singles ===
Rank	Name	Total points	SP		FS	
1	Darian Kaptich	133.49	1	47.20	1	86.29
2	Sam Gillard	106.60	3	35.65	2	70.95
3	Alex Sun	98.43	2	36.21	3	62.22
4	Callum Bradshaw	86.86	4	28.66	4	58.20
5	Andy Yao	68.03	5	25.17	5	42.86

=== Women's singles ===
Rank	Name	Total points	SP		FS	
1	Amelia Jackson	108.22	1	39.11	1	69.11
2	Lucy Sori Yun	101.39	5	35.95	2	65.44
3	(New Zealand) Danielle Gebser	100.88	2	38.84	5	62.04
4	Romy Grogan	97.63	7	35.11	4	62.52
5	Cailin O'Keefe	96.29	10	32.69	3	63.60
6	Madalyn Cherry	95.62	3	37.90	7	57.72
7	Shania Sime	94.57	6	35.91	6	58.66
8	Corina Ormston	92.61	4	37.20	8	55.41
9	Jordyn Dekkers	86.12	11	31.83	9	54.29
10	Sarah Batey	85.15	9	33.02	11	52.13
11	Tegan Wright	84.61	12	30.87	10	53.74
12	(New Zealand) Ella Smith	80.20	14	30.36	12	49.84
13	Arielle Jennings	77.86	8	33.08	19	44.78
14	Jessica Rotondo	77.03	18	27.62	13	49.41
15	Georgina Wooderson	76.29	19	27.51	14	48.78
16	Emily Peak	75.74	15	29.55	15	46.19
17	Merryn O'Keefe	74.63	16	29.20	18	45.43
18	Tessa Hobday	74.56	17	28.56	17	46.00
19	Lia Webb-McDougall	71.86	13	30.49	21	41.37
20	Eliza Hall	71.60	22	25.55	16	46.05
21	Nikita Jan	68.66	21	25.68	20	42.98
22	Ariel Wang	65.99	20	26.34	22	39.65
23	Jorja Petfield	53.85	23	25.04	23	28.81

=== Ice dance ===
Rank	Name	Total points	RD		FD	
1	Matilda Friend / William Badaoui	129.94	1	51.65	1	78.29
2	Jessica Palfreyman / Nicholas McCreary	100.62	2	36.85	2	63.77
3	Brittany Ross / Jake Meyer	84.97	3	33.82	3	51.15

=== Synchronized skating ===
Rank	Name	Total points	SP		FS	
1	Iceskateers Elite	106.23	1	40.99	1	65.24
2	Infusion Junior	98.19	2	40.18	3	62.03
3	Majestic Ice	98.07	3	36.04	2	58.01
4	Southern Sky	84.71	4	29.02	4	55.69

== International team selections ==
=== World Championships ===
Men	Ladies	Pairs	Ice dance
Brendan Kerry	Kailani Craine	Ekaterina Alexandrovskaya / Harley Windsor	Chantelle Kerry / Andrew Dodds

=== Four Continents Championships ===
Men	Ladies	Pairs	Ice dance
Brendan Kerry	Kailani Craine	Ekaterina Alexandrovskaya / Harley Windsor	Chantelle Kerry / Andrew Dodds
Andrew Dodds	Brooklee Han		Matilda Friend / William Badaoui
Mark Webster			

=== World Junior Championships ===
Ice dance
Jessica Palfreyman / Nicholas McCreary

=== World Synchronized Skating Championships ===
Synchronized
Team Unity

=== World Junior Synchronized Skating Championships ===
Synchronized
Majestic Ice
