= Tim Spencer =

Tim Spencer or Timothy Spencer may refer to:

== People ==
- Tim Spencer (American football) (born 1960), American football running back
- Tim Spencer (figure skater) (born 1943), Australian figure skater
- Tim Spencer (singer) (1908–1974), American singer and actor
- Timothy Wilson Spencer (1962–1994), American serial killer

== Fictional characers ==
- Timothy Spencer (Coronation Street)
