= Sarah-Yvonne Prytula =

Australian figure skater

Personal information
- Born: 3 May 1984 (age 42) Sydney, Australia
- Height: 1.64 m (5 ft 4 1/2 in)

Figure skating career
- Country: Australia
- Coach: Galina Pachin, Andrei Pachin, Belinda Trussell
- Skating club: Sydney Figure Skating Club
- Began skating: 1990
- Retired: 2006

Sarah-Yvonne Prytula (born 3 May 1984 in Sydney) is an Australian former competitive figure skater who competed in women's singles. At the Australian Championships, she won one silver and four bronze medals. She appeared at five Four Continents Championships and the 2000 World Championships.

== Programs ==
Season	Short program	Free skating
2004–05	Sahara by Haylie Ecker performed by Bond	Frida by Elliot Goldenthal
2003–04	Bond Shine (James Bond soundtrack) by H. Ecker	Frida by Elliot Goldenthal
2001–03	Crazy Rhythm by Harry James	Autumn Leaves by Roger Williams; Born Free; Unforgettable Themes

== Results ==
JGP: Junior Grand Prix

International
Event	97–98	98–99	99–00	00–01	01–02	02–03	03–04	04–05	05–06
Worlds			37th						
Four Continents			23rd		24th	19th	19th	21st	
Golden Spin			19th					24th	
Universiade			19th						
International: Junior
JGP Japan			15th						
JGP Slovakia		19th							
National
Australian Championships	3rd	2nd		3rd	4th	6th	3rd	3rd	5th
New Zealand Championships							1st		
