= Anthony Liu =

Chinese-Australian figure skater

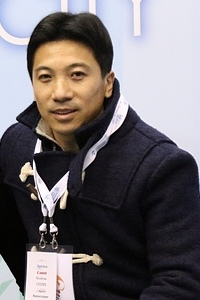

Personal information
- Other names: Liu Yueming
- Born: 4 July 1974 (age 52) Qiqihar, China
- Home town: Brisbane, Australia
- Height: 1.68 m (5 ft 6 in)

Figure skating career
- Country: Australia (1996–2003); China (until 1993)
- Skating club: Iceworld FSC
- Began skating: 1981
- Retired: 2003

Anthony Liu (born Liu Yueming on 4 July 1974) is a Chinese-Australian figure skater. A seven-time Australian national champion, he represented Australia at the 1998 Winter Olympics, where he placed 25th, and at the 2002 Winter Olympics, where he placed 10th.

== Personal life ==
Liu was born on 4 July 1974 in Qiqihar, China. He moved with his family to Australia in 1994 and became a citizen in August 1996.

== Career ==
Early in his skating career, Liu represented China under the given name Yueming. He placed 6th at the 1993 World Junior Championships and 21st at the senior World Championships later that season. He won the gold medal at the 1993 Winter Universiade.

In 1996, he began competing for Australia as Anthony Liu. He won his national title and was sent to the World Championships, where he finished 22nd. The next season, Liu earned a berth to the 1998 Winter Olympics in Nagano and placed 25th. At the 1998 Australian Nationals, he became the first Australian skater to land a quadruple jump (toe loop). On his way to his career-best Four Continents result, 5th in 1999, Liu landed a quadruple-triple toe loop combination.

In 2002, Liu achieved a 10th-place finish in his second Olympics. Alongside Adrian Swan (Oslo 1952), it was Australia's best Olympic result in figure skating. He ended the season with his career-best Worlds result, 7th.

== Programs ==
Season	Short program	Free skating
2001–02	Pearl Harbor by Hans Zimmer	Journey of Man (from Cirque du Soleil) by Benoît Jutras
2000–01	Don Pasquale by Donizetti performed by Waldo de Los Rios and Orchestra	Journey of Man (from Cirque du Soleil) by Benoît Jutras

== Results ==
GP: Grand Prix

=== For Australia ===
International
Event	95–96	96–97	97–98	98–99	99–00	00–01	01–02	02–03
Olympics			25th				10th	
Worlds		22nd	17th	10th	12th	14th	7th	
Four Continents				5th	6th	13th		
GP NHK Trophy					8th	8th	5th	
GP Skate America					7th			
GP Skate Canada							4th	
Finlandia Trophy		3rd	8th	2nd				
Golden Spin		3rd						
Goodwill Games							4th	
Nebelhorn Trophy		4th						
Ondrej Nepela		2nd	1st					
Orex Cup	2nd							
Karl Schäfer			2nd	1st				
Summer Cup	1st							
National
Australian Champ.		1st	1st	1st	1st	1st	1st	1st

=== For China ===
International
Event	1992–93
Worlds	21st
GP NHK Trophy	8th
International: Junior
Junior Worlds	6th
National
Chinese Champs.	1st
