= Peter Cain (figure skater) =

Australian pair skater

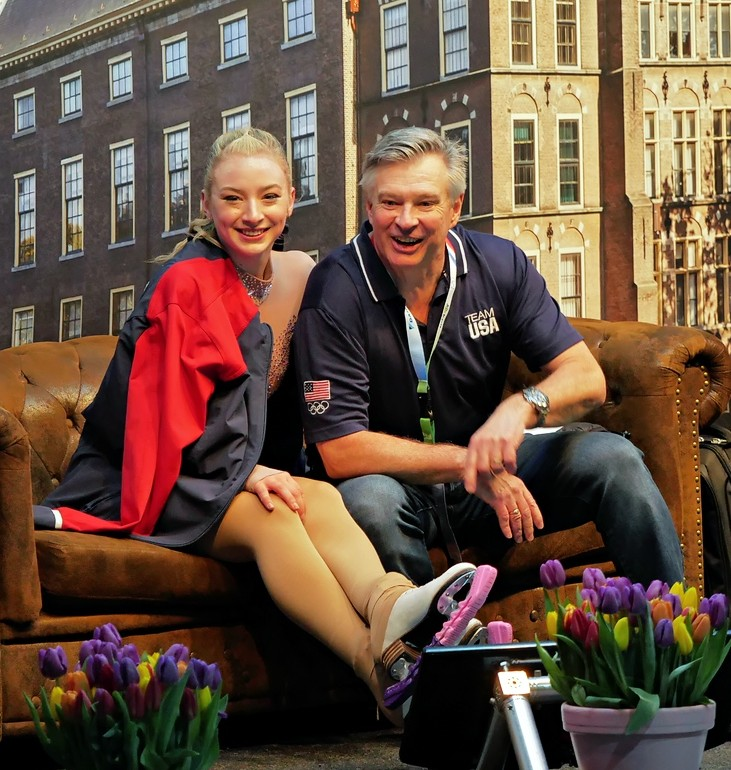
- Peter Cain with Amber Glenn in 2019

Personal information
- Full name: Peter Christian Cain
- Born: 20 November 1958 (age 67)

Figure skating career
- Country: Australia

Peter Christian Cain (born 20 November 1958) is an Australian pair skater who currently works as a coach. With sister Elizabeth Cain, he is the 1976 World Junior bronze medalist and a four-time Australian national champion. Their highest placement at the World Championships was 12th in 1977. They competed in the 1980 Winter Olympics, finishing eleventh. He is the uncle and former coach of Australian national champion Sean Carlow and father of American skater Ashley Cain. His former students include Alexei Krasnozhon, Brooklee Han, and Amber Glenn. He currently works as a coach in the Euless, Texas area.

He is an ISU Technical Specialist for Australia.

== Results ==
(with Cain)

International
Event	75–76	76–77	77–78	78–79	79–80
Olympics					11th
Worlds		12th	14th	13th	14th
International: Junior
Junior Worlds	3rd				
National
Australian Champ.	1st	1st	1st		1st
British Champ.	3rd				
J = Junior level
