= Sharon Burley =

Australian figure skater

Sharon Kay Burley Sullivan (born 8 May 1956 in Tripoli, Libya) is an Australian figure skater who competed in ladies singles. She finished first at the Australian Figure Skating Championships four times and competed at the 1976 Winter Olympic Games, coming in twentieth.

She now coaches at the Goldcoast ice rink: Iceland in bundall as the only figure skating Olympian from Queensland.

Burley is the daughter of Olympic figure skater Nancy Burley and the sister of Australian champion Robyn Burley.

== Results ==
International
Event	71–72	72–73	73–74	74–75	75–76	77–78
Olympics					20th	
Worlds	19th	21st	26th	25th	22nd	
Prague Skate						6th
National
Australian Champ.		1st	1st	1st	1st	
