= Vicki Holland =

Australian figure skater

Personal information
- Full name: Vicki Maree Holland
- Other names: Vicki Nelson
- Born: 11 September 1962 (age 63) Sydney, New South Wales, Australia

Figure skating career
- Country: Australia
- Retired: c. 1984

Vicki Maree Holland or Nelson (born 11 September 1962) is an Australian former competitive figure skater. She is a four-time Australian national champion (1980–1981 to 1983–1984) and competed at the 1984 Winter Olympics in Sarajevo.

== Competitive highlights ==
International
Event	75–76	76–77	77–78	78–79	79–80	80–81	81–82	82–83	83–84
Olympics									21st
Worlds						24th	27th	26th	
International: Junior
Junior Worlds	10th	12th	19th	11th					
National
Australian Champ.						1st	1st	1st	1st
