= Trent Nelson-Bond =

Australian ice dancer

Personal information
- Born: 30 December 1979 (age 46)
- Height: 184 cm (6 ft 0 in)

Figure skating career
- Country: Australia
- Skating club: Sydney FSC
- Retired: 2006

Trent Nelson-Bond (born 30 December 1979 in Sydney) is an Australian ice dancer. He competed with Natalie Buck. They are the 2002–2006 Australian national champions. They have competed five times at the World Figure Skating Championships and six times at the Four Continents Championships. Their highest placing was 12th at the 2004 and 2006 Four Continents.

Before teaming up with Buck, Nelson-Bond competed with Danielle Rigg-Smith, with whom he was the 1999 National Champion.

They retired from competitive skating following the 2005–06 Olympic season.

== Competitive highlights ==
(with Rigg-Smith)

Event	1999	2000
World Championships	32nd	
Four Continents Championships	11th	
Australian Championships	1st	2nd

(with Buck)

Event	2000–01	2001–02	2002–03	2003–04	2004–05	2005–06
World Championships		28th	25th	26th	28th	28th
Four Continents Championships	14th	13th	WD	12th	14th	12th
Australian Championships	2nd	1st	1st	1st	1st	1st
Golden Spin of Zagreb		15th		7th	7th	
Karl Schäfer Memorial						15th
Nebelhorn Trophy			10th			
Pavel Roman Memorial					5th	
