= Allan Ganter =

Australian figure skater

Allan Ganter (born 18 June 1938) is a former Australian figure skater who competed at the 1956 Winter Olympics. He scored 132.41 points and finished 13th out of 16 competitors in the men's individual event.

== Results ==
Event	1953	1954	1955	1956
Winter Olympic Games				13th
World Championships				11th
Australian Championships	1st	1st	1st	1st

== Sources ==
- The Compendium: Official Australian Olympic Statistics 1896–2002. Australian Olympic Committee. pp. 215–227. ISBN 0-7022-3425-7.
