= Belinda Noonan =

Australian figure skater

Personal information
- Other names: Belinda Coulthard
- Born: 1957 (age 68–69) Sydney, Australia

Figure skating career
- Country: Australia
- Partner: Mark Lynch, Phillip Brown
- Coach: Linda Brauckmann, Gloria Aiken, Cubby Lyons, Gladys Hogg
- Skating club: Sydney Figure Skating Club
- Began skating: 1965
- Retired: 1980

Belinda Noonan, née Coulthard (born in 1957) is an Australian former competitive figure skater. Competing in ladies' singles, she won silver at the 1977 Golden Spin of Zagreb, bronze at a 1978 competition in Heerenveen, and the Australian national title during the 1979–1980 season.

== Career ==
Coulthard first stepped on the ice as a two-year-old, at the Bondi Junction rink. She grew interested in skating at age seven, after the opening of the Burwood ice rink. After her first instructor, Cubby Lyons, ended her coaching career, Coulthard was coached by Gloria Aiken (Pracey). She spent three months in 1970 training under Linda Brauckmann in Vancouver, British Columbia, Canada, and would later travel occasionally to London, England (c. 1975–1978), to learn from Gladys Hogg.

Coulthard competed in both ladies' singles and pairs. With her first partner, Phillip Brown, she won the junior national pairs' title in 1968. Competing on the senior level, she and Mark Lynch became four-time national champions during the early 1970s.

As a single skater, Coulthard won the silver medal at the 1977 Golden Spin of Zagreb and the Australian national title during the 1979–1980 season. She finished 28th at the 1979 World Championships in Vienna, Austria, and 24th at the 1980 World Championships in Dortmund, West Germany. Australia elected not to send her to the 1980 Olympics, leading to her decision to switch to coaching.

Noonan coached Amanda James to a national title in the 1984–85 season. She is based at the Sydney Figure Skating Club. She has also served as a figure skating consultant for the Olympic Winter Institute of Australia, as a commentator for Channel Seven at the Winter Olympics, and as a judge for Torvill & Dean's Dancing on Ice (Channel Nine Australia). She is the editor of a community newspaper, Burwood Scene, and was named Burwood's Citizen of the Year in January 2016.

== Competitive highlights ==
=== Ladies' singles ===
International
Event	72–73	77–78	78–79	79–80
World Championships			28th	24th
Golden Spin of Zagreb		2nd		
Ennia Challenge Cup			3rd	
National
Australian Championships	1st J			1st
J = Junior level

=== Pairs with Lynch ===
National
Event	71–72	72–73	72–73	73–74
Australian Championships	1st	1st	1st	1st

=== Pairs with Brown ===
National
Event	68–69
Australian Championships	1st J
J = Junior level
