= Bradley Santer =

Australian figure skater (born 1982)

Personal information
- Born: 9 April 1982 (age 44) Wahroonga, New South Wales, Australia
- Height: 1.76 m (5 ft 9 1/2 in)
- Spouse: Kristen Treni (m. 2011)

Figure skating career
- Country: Australia
- Skating club: Sydney FSC
- Retired: 2006

Bradley Santer (born 9 April 1982) is an Australian figure skater who competed in men's singles. He became a two-time Australian national champion (2003 and 2004) and appeared at multiple World and Four Continents Championships. He turned professional following the 2005–06 season.

On 27 June 2007, Disney announced that Santer would play the role of Troy Bolton in the east coast version of Disney's High School Musical: The Ice Tour.

== Programs ==
Season	Short program	Free skating
2005–06	Blues for Klook by Eddy Louiss	Kill Bill; Crane by the RZA and Charles Bernstein; Battle Without Honor or Humanity by Tomoyasu Hotei; White Lightning by the RZA and Charles Bernstein; Don't Let Me Be Misunderstood by Santa Esmeralda
2003–05	Pussycat by Coleman; Binga, Banga, Bongo by E. Palmer, T. Snyder	Furious Angels (from The Matrix Reloaded) by Rob Dougan; Teahouse (from The Matrix Reloaded) by Juno Reactor; Barber's Adagio for Strings by William Orbit; Furious Angels (from The Matrix Reloaded) by Rob Dougan
2002–03	Clubbed to Death (from The Matrix) by Rob Dougan and Orchestra	Aegina (from Spartacus) by Aram Khachaturian
2000–02	Clubbed to Death (from The Matrix) by Rob Dougan and Orchestra	Two Guitars (Russian folk music) by Paul Mauriat's Orchestra

== Competitive highlights ==
JGP: Junior Grand Prix

International
Event	97–98	98–99	99–00	00–01	01–02	02–03	03–04	04–05	05–06	06–07
Worlds			37th			37th	35th	16th Q		
Four Continents			18th	15th	14th	14th	13th	13th	15th	
Golden Spin			19th	20th		15th	18th	10th	17th	
Karl Schäfer								14th		
International: Junior
Junior Worlds				28th						
JGP Germany				8th						
JGP Japan			12th							
JGP Norway			16th	18th						
National
Australia	4th J	3rd J	4th	1st J	2nd	2nd	1st	1st	2nd	2nd
J = Junior level; Q = Qualifying round
