= Tamara Heggen =

Australian figure skater (born 1976)

Personal information
- Born: 1976 (age 49–50)

Figure skating career
- Country: Australia
- Retired: 1990s

Tamara Heggen (born in 1976) is an Australian former competitive figure skater who won three Australian national titles in the early 1990s. She competed at three World Championships, reaching the free skate in 1992 (Oakland, California), and three World Junior Championships. She represented New South Wales through the 1990–1991 season and then Queensland. After retiring from competition, she remained in Queensland.

== Competitive highlights ==
International
Event	88–89	89–90	90–91	91–92	92–93
Worlds			30th	23rd	27th
Prague Skate			12th		
International: Junior
Junior Worlds	18th	22nd			
Grand Prize SNP	3rd J				
National
Australian Champ.			1st	1st	1st
J = Junior level
