= Ice Skating Australia =

- Sport: Ice Skating
- Jurisdiction: National
- Affiliation: International Skating Union
- Headquarters: Archerfield, Queensland, Australia
- President: Wendy Meik
- Board members: Diane Di Gemma, Moira Henningsen, John Dunn
- Secretary: Carol Ashworth

Official website
- www.isa.org.au
- (Australia)

Ice Skating Australia Incorporated (ISA) is the governing body for the sport of Ice Skating in Australia. They have organized the Australian Figure Skating Championships since 1931. In 1932, the ISA joined International Skating Union as a Figure Skating Member. They are also a national federation under the Olympic Winter Institute of Australia. Australian skaters competed for the first time at the World Championships in 1947.

== Structure ==
The organizational structure consists of a board with three executives (President, Secretary, and Treasurer) and four board members, seven committees, four officers, and the ISA Council which is made up of the eight state member associations. These associations include Act Ice Skating Association Inc. (ACTISA), New South Wales Ice Skating Association Inc. (NSWISA), Figure Skating Association Northern Territory (FSANT), Ice Skating Queensland Inc. (ISQ), South Australian Ice Skating Association (SAISA), The Figure Skating Association of Tasmania Inc. (FSAT), Ice Skating Victoria (ISV), and Western Australian Ice Skating Association Inc. (WAISA). The total voting body of the ISA Council consists of 20 members.
