= Miriam Manzano =

Australian figure skater

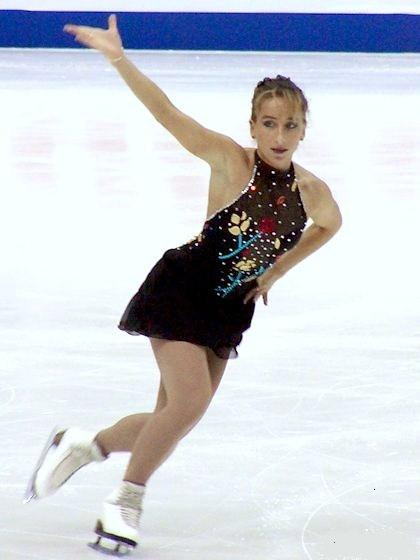
- Manzano at the 2004 NHK Trophy

Personal information
- Born: 14 February 1975 (age 51) Sydney, Australia
- Height: 1.55 m (5 ft 1 in)

Figure skating career
- Country: Australia
- Coach: Reg Park, Liz Cain, Colin Jackson, Magda Mayer, Kathy Casey
- Skating club: Canberra Ice Skating Club
- Began skating: 1986
- Retired: 2006

Miriam Manzano-Hammond (born 14 February 1975 in Sydney) is a former Australian competitive figure skater in ladies' singles. She is the 2003 Merano Cup champion, the 2002 Karl Schäfer Memorial silver medalist, the 2003 Finlandia Trophy bronze medalist, and a six-time Australian national champion.

Manzano began skating at age 11, in 1986. Following her retirement from competitive skating, she began working as a coach in Philip, Canberra, Australia.

== Programs ==
Season	Short program	Free skating
2005–2006	Sabre Dance by Aram Khachaturian	Only You by Rachel Portman
2003–2005	The Enchanted Nymph by Mischa Levitzki	Nights in the Gardens of Spain by Manuel de Falla, Royal Philharmonic Orchestra
2002–2003	Concierto de Aranjuez by Joaquín Rodrigo	The Count of Monte Cristo by Edward Shearmur, London Metropolitan Orchestra
2000–2002	Concierto de Aranjuez by Joaquín Rodrigo	Only You by Rachel Portman

== Results ==
GP: Grand Prix

International
Event	90–91	91–92	92–93	93–94	94–95	95–96	96–97	97–98	00–01	01–02	02–03	03–04	04–05	05–06
Worlds				39th		36th				16th	26th	20th		31st
Four Continents									14th	12th	10th	11th	9th	12th
GP Skate America											9th		8th	
GP NHK Trophy													7th	11th
Czech Skate						6th								
Finlandia Trophy							6th	11th				3rd		
Golden Spin									13th					
Merano Cup												1st		
Nebelhorn Trophy				17th	11th									
Ondrej Nepela							6th	11th		6th				
Karl Schäfer						15th	12th	4th			2nd	7th		
Skate Israel						5th								
St. Gervais				11th	12th									
Summer Trophy					1st									
International: Junior
Junior Worlds	24th			29th										
Grand Prize SNP			5th J											
Piruetten		8th J												
National
Australian Champ.		3rd		1st	2nd	3rd	2nd	2nd	2nd	1st	1st	1st	1st	1st
J = Junior level
