= Jacqueline Mason =

Australian pair skater (1935–2020)

Jacqueline "Jackie" Mason Kendall-Baker (15 June 1935 – 9 April 2020) was an Australian pair skater who competed at the 1956 and 1960 Winter Olympics in a pairing with Mervyn Bower. In 1956, they failed to take to the ice after Bower was injured. In 1960, they placed twelfth out of thirteen duos. In 1979 she was a judge in the World Figure Skating Championships in Vienna; in 1980 Mason was a judge in the Winter Olympics.

== Results ==
(with Bower)

Event	1951	1952	1953	1954	1955	1956	1957	1958	1959	1960	1961	1962	1963	1964
Winter Olympic Games										12th				
World Championships		9th				11th								
Australian Championships	1st	1st	1st	1st	1st	1st	1st	1st	1st	1st		1st		1st
British Championships		3rd				3rd								
