= Natalie Buck =

Australian ice dancer

Personal information
- Born: 5 July 1980 (age 46)
- Height: 163 cm (5 ft 4 in)

Figure skating career
- Country: Australia
- Skating club: Sydney FSC
- Retired: 2006

Natalie Buck (born 5 July 1980 in Sydney) is an Australian former ice dancer. She competed with Trent Nelson-Bond. They are the 2002–06 Australian national champions. They have competed five times at the World Figure Skating Championships and six times at the Four Continents Championships. Their highest placement was 12th at the 2004 and 2006 Four Continents. They retired from competitive skating following the 2005–06 Olympic season.

She used a special physical and psychological training program that former Olympian swimmer Semyon Belits-Geiman had developed for figure skaters.

Buck previously competed as a single skater at the national level.

== Competitive highlights ==
(with Nelson-Bond)

Event	2000–01	2001–02	2002–03	2003–04	2004–05	2005–06
World Championships		28th	25th	26th	28th	28th
Four Continents Championships	14th	13th	WD	12th	14th	12th
Australian Championships	2nd	1st	1st	1st	1st	1st
Golden Spin of Zagreb		15th		7th	7th	
Karl Schäfer Memorial						15th
Nebelhorn Trophy			10th			
Pavel Roman Memorial					5th	
