= Cameron Medhurst =

Australian figure skater

Personal information
- Full name: Cameron Bradley Medhurst
- Born: 10 June 1965 (age 61) Melbourne, Victoria, Australia

Figure skating career
- Country: Australia
- Retired: 1992

Cameron Bradley Medhurst (born 10 June 1965) is an Australian former competitive figure skater. He is an eight-time (1982, 1984–1990) Australian national champion. He represented Australia at the 1984 Winter Olympics, where he placed 19th; at the 1988 Winter Olympics, where he again placed 19th; and at the 1992 Winter Olympics, where he placed 16th.

After retiring from competition, Medhurst appeared in ice shows and became a coach and choreographer. He is now a full-time coach at the Medibank Icehouse, Melbourne.

== Results ==
International
Event	78–79	79–80	80–81	81-82	82–83	83–84	84–85	85–86	86–87	87–88	88–89	89–90	90–91	91–92
Olympics						19th				19th				16th
Worlds					21st		18th	22nd	22nd	11th	10th	12th	17th	18th
GP Skate America									9th		8th	10th	13th	
GP Skate Canada											5th	10th	6th	
International: Junior
Junior Worlds	23rd	16th	7th											
National
Australian Champs.			2nd	2nd	1st	2nd	1st	1st	1st	1st	1st	1st	1st	
