= Gweneth Molony =

Australian figure skater

Personal information
- Full name: Gweneth Molony
- Other names: Gwenneth Molony; Gweneth Henke
- Born: 17 June 1932 (age 94)

Figure skating career
- Country: Australia

Gweneth (or Gwenneth) Molony (born 17 June 1932) is an Australian figure skater. She was the 1949–1951 Australian national champion. She represented Australia at the 1952 Winter Olympics, where she placed 21st. She and Nancy Burley were the first ladies singles skaters to represent Australia at the Olympics. Molony also competed in pair skating; she was the 1949 Australian national champion with partner Adrian Swan. In 2020 at the IOC (International Olympic Committee) headquarters in Lausanne, she was recognised as Australia's first female Winter Olympian. She was presented with her Olympian certificate, and became the earliest Olympian to sign the athletes wall at the new IOC headquarters.

== Family ==
Molony came from a skating family. Her father, E.J. "Ted" Molony, competed in ice dancing, and her elder sister, Patricia Molony, was the first Australian lady to compete at the World Championships.

== Personal life ==
Molony married former ice hockey player and sports administrator Geoff Henke. Their daughter, Joanne, was a member of the Olympic downhill skiing team which competed in Innsbruck in 1976.

== Competitive highlights ==
=== Single skating ===
Event	1950	1951	1952
Winter Olympic Games			21st
World Championships			19th
Australian Championships	1st	1st	1st

=== Pair skating ===
(with Swan)

Event	1950
Australian Championships	1st

== Sources ==
- Gordon, Harry (2003). The time of our lives: inside the Sydney Olympics: Australia and the Olympic Games 1994–2002. University of Queensland. ISBN 0-7022-3412-5.
- Sport: Skating - Figure - Australian Olympic Committee
- "Australian national champions 1931–2004" (PDF). Archived from the original (PDF) on 29 August 2007.
