= Paris Stephens =

Australian pair skater

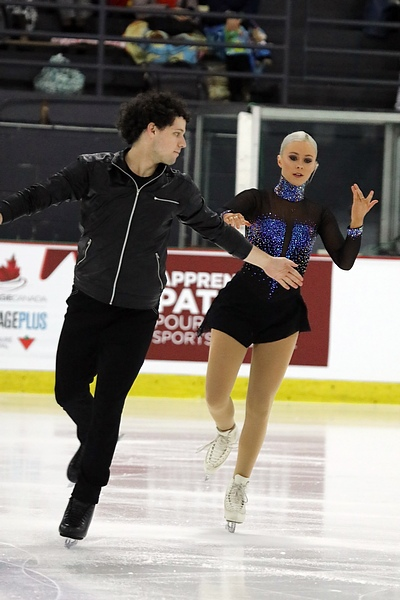

Personal information
- Born: 22 October 1998 (age 27) Brisbane, Queensland
- Height: 1.55 m (5 ft 1 in)

Figure skating career
- Country: Australia
- Partner: Matthew Dodds
- Coach: Margaret Nicholls
- Skating club: Boondall FSC
- Began skating: 2009

Paris Stephens (born 22 October 1998) is an Australian pair skater. With partner Matthew Dodds, she is the 2013 Skate Down Under champion, the 2016 Volvo Open Cup silver medalist, and a four-time Australian national champion (2013-2015, 2017).

== Competitive highlights ==
=== Pairs with Dodds ===
International
Event	13-14	14-15	15–16	16–17	17–18
CS Autumn Classic				6th	7th
CS Lombardia		4th			
CS Nebelhorn		10th	7th		
CS Ondrej Nepela			10th		
CS Tallinn Trophy					7th
CS U.S. Classic			7th	5th	9th
Asian Open Trophy				5th	4th
Asian Winter Games					7th
Cup of Nice	10th				
MNNT Cup			8th		
Skate Down Under	1st				
Volvo Open Cup				2nd	
National
Australian Champ.	1st	1st	1st	2nd	1st
J = Junior level; WD = Withdrew
