= Adrian Swan =

Australian figure skater

Personal information
- Full name: Adrian David Swan
- Born: 15 January 1930 Melbourne
- Died: 29 September 1989 (aged 59) Melbourne

Figure skating career
- Country: Australia

Adrian David Swan (15 January 1930 – 29 September 1989) was an Australian figure skater. He represented Australia at the 1952 Winter Olympics, where he placed 10th. He was the first men's singles skater to represent Australia at the Olympics. In 1951, he also competed at the British Figure Skating Championships. Swan also competed in pair skating; he is the 1949 Australian national champion with partner Gwenneth Molony.

== Competitive highlights ==
Event	1951	1952
Winter Olympics		10th
World Championships		10th
Australian Championships	1st	
British Championships		1st

Pairs (with Molony)

Event	1950
Australian Championships	1st
