= Zara Pasfield =

Australian figure skater

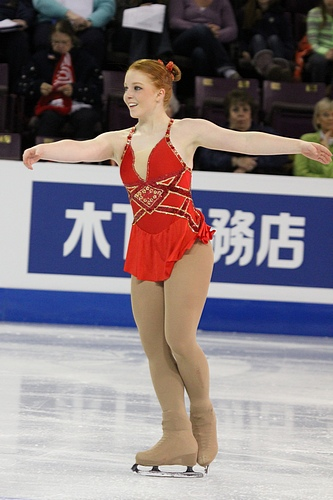

Personal information
- Home town: Sydney

Figure skating career
- Country: Australia
- Coach: Michael Pasfield
- Skating club: Macquarie ISC
- Began skating: 2002

Zara Pasfield is a retired Australian figure skater. She is the 2011 NZ Winter Games bronze medalist and the 2012 Australian national champion.

On the junior level, she is a two-time Australian junior national bronze medalist (2009, 2011).

== Personal life ==
Pasfield is the daughter of Michael Pasfield, a former competitive figure skater, and sister of Katie Pasfield, a two-time Australian ladies' bronze medallist (2017, 2018).

Pasfield graduated from Pymble Ladies' College in 2013 and from the University of Technology Sydney in 2017 with a degree in spatial and interior architecture.

== Competitive highlights ==
International
Event	08-09	09-10	10–11	11–12	12–13
Four Continents				29th	
NZ Winter Games				3rd	
International: Junior
JGP Austria				29th	
Crystal Skate					18th
Istanbul Cup				5th	
Merano Cup		12th			
Tirnavia Ice Cup					30th
National
Australian Champ.				1st	
Australian Junior Champ.	1st N	3rd J		3rd J	
J = Junior level; WD = Withdrew
