= Stephanie Zhang =

Chinese-Australian figure skater

Personal information
- Born: 22 May 1985 (age 41) Harbin, China
- Home town: Sydney, Australia
- Height: 1.70 m (5 ft 7 in)

Figure skating career
- Country: Australia
- Coach: Andrei Pachin, E. Kramer, B. Trussell, F. Fu, C. Jackson
- Skating club: Sydney Figure Skating Club
- Began skating: 1989
- Retired: 2013

Stephanie Zhang (born 22 May 1985) is a retired Chinese-Australian figure skater. She is a two-time Australian national senior champion and a six-time national junior champion.

== Personal life ==
Zhang was born on 22 May 1985, in Harbin, China. She moved to Australia with her parents at the age of nine and was offered citizenship at age thirteen due to her talent.

== Career ==
Zhang began learning to skate at the age of four. In 2000, she won a bronze medal at the ISU Junior Grand Prix in China.

Making her senior international debut, she placed 10th at the 2001 Four Continents Championships. She also continued to appear on the junior level, placing 12th at the 2001 World Junior Championships and 7th at the 2002 World Junior Championships. She placed 25th at the 2002 Winter Olympics in Salt Lake City.

Zhang stopped competing after finishing off the podium at the 2005 Australian Championships. She made a brief return to competition in the 2012–13 season.

Zhang has formally retired from competitions, and is currently instructing at Macquarie Ice Rink as a coach for private lessons.

== Programs ==
Season	Short program	Free skating
2002–2003	An Artist's Life by Johann Strauss performed by the Boston Pops Orchestra	Winter (from The Four Seasons) by Antonio Vivaldi
2001–2002	An Artist's Life by Johann Strauss performed by the Boston Pops Orchestra	Violin Concerto in D by Pyotr Ilyich Tchaikovsky
2000–2001	Spring Waters by Tchaikovsky, Sergei Rachmaninoff performed by the London Promenade Orchestra	La Bayadère by Ludwig Minkus performed by the English Chamber Orchestra

== Results ==
JGP: Junior Grand Prix

International
Event	98–99	99–00	00–01	01–02	02–03	04–05	12–13
Olympics				25th			
Worlds			37th				
Four Continents			10th				
Goodwill Games				8th			
Golden Spin				6th	6th		
Ondrej Nepela				5th			
New Year's Cup							15th
Volvo Open Cup							16th
International: Junior
Junior Worlds		25th		12th	7th		
JGP China			3rd		14th		
JGP Czech Rep.		16th		5th			
JGP Italy					18th		
JGP Mexico			7th				
JGP Netherlands		14th					
National
Australia	2nd	1st	1st	2nd	3rd	4th	3rd
