= Cheltzie Lee =

Australian figure skater

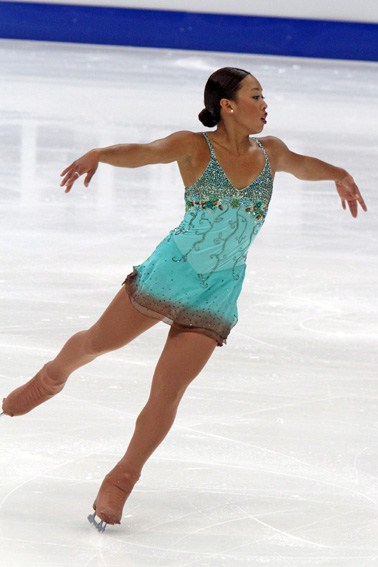
- Lee at the 2011 Four Continents

Personal information
- Born: 21 April 1993 (age 33) Campbelltown, New South Wales
- Height: 1.53 m (5 ft 0 in)

Figure skating career
- Country: Australia
- Skating club: Sydney Figure Skating Club
- Began skating: 1999
- Retired: 2011

Cheltzie Lee (born 21 April 1993) is an Australian former competitive figure skater. She is the 2010 national champion and represented Australia at the 2010 Winter Olympics in Vancouver. She also competed at seven ISU Championships, achieving her best result, tenth, at the 2011 Four Continents.

== Personal life ==
Cheltzie Lee was born 21 April 1993 in Campbelltown, New South Wales. Her African American mother, Renita, is from Louisiana, and her Chinese father was born in Bangladesh. She practiced gymnastics from age six to twelve. She was left with a permanent spinal defect after a car accident in 2007.

Lee attended Mt Carmel Catholic High School. She then decided to pursue a Bachelor of Inclusive/Primary Education and Disability Studies. In 2017, she married Australian freestyle skier and 2014 Winter Olympian Sam Hall.

== Career ==
Lee began learning to skate as a five-year-old, at Canterbury Ice Rink. She debuted on the ISU Junior Grand Prix series in 2007 and placed 23rd at the 2008 World Championships.

Lee began the 2009–2010 season at the 2009 Nebelhorn Trophy, competing to earn a spot for Australia in the ladies' event at the 2010 Winter Olympics. She finished as the first alternate. After Israel decided not to send Tamar Katz, Lee was named to the Australian Olympic team. At the 2010 Vancouver Winter Olympics, she placed 18th in the short program with a score of 52.16 points (a personal best) to qualify for the free skate. She finished 20th overall at the Olympics and 17th at the 2010 World Championships. Kylie Fennell, Gloria Pracey, and Andrei Filippov coached her at the Sydney Figure Skating Club.

During the 2010–2011 season, Lee placed tenth at the 2011 Four Continents Championships and 21st at the 2011 World Championships.

Lee decided to take a year off to concentrate on her university studies and to "live a little". She returned to competition in June 2012, winning the Hollins Trophy at her home rink of Canterbury and the 2012 WinterSun in Boondall, Queensland.

Lee hoped to qualify for the 2014 Winter Olympics but injuries hindered her training in later years; she tore her posterior cruciate ligament and was also diagnosed with osteitis pubis.

== Programs ==
Season	Short program	Free skating
2010–2011	Chez Lez Ye Ye by Boogalox	Yentl by Michel Legrand
2009–2010	Feeling Good by Michael Bublé	Elizabeth: The Golden Age by Craig Armstrong and A. R. Rahman; Opening; Horseriding; Immensities; Closing
2008–2009	Capone by Ronan Hardiman	Elizabeth: The Golden Age by Craig Armstrong and A. R. Rahman; Opening; Horseriding; Immensities; Closing
2007–2008	Sing, Sing, Sing; Summertime Blues Jazz Blues and Boogie by Mike Strickland choreo. by Cameron Medhurst	Madagascar by Hans Zimmer; Zoosters Breakout; Born Free; Found Our Roar choreo. by Cameron Medhurst

== Competitive highlights ==
JGP: Junior Grand Prix

International
Event	05–06	06–07	07–08	08–09	09–10	10–11
Olympics					20th	
Worlds				33rd	17th	21st
Four Continents				13th	14th	10th
Nebelhorn Trophy					15th	
International: Junior
Junior Worlds			23rd			
JGP Austria			5th			
JGP Germany					7th	
JGP Great Britain				14th		
AYOF		6th				
National
Australian Champ.	4th N	2nd J	1st J	WD	1st	WD
Levels: N = Novice, J = Junior; WD = Withdrew
