= Robert McNamara (figure skater) =

Australian figure skater

Personal information
- Born: 18 August 1987 (age 38) Southport, Queensland
- Height: 1.78 m (5 ft 10 in)

Figure skating career
- Country: Australia
- Coach: Collin Jackson, Ekaterina Borodatova, Anthony Liu, Robyn Burtey
- Skating club: Iceworld FSC; FSC Loganholme
- Began skating: 1993
- Retired: 2011

Robert McNamara (born 18 August 1987 in Southport, Queensland) is a former Australian former figure skater. He competed at three Four Continents Championships and won the Australian national title in the 2009–10 season. He is currently a coach and choreographer at the AdventHealth Center Ice rink in Wesley Chapel, Florida.

== Programs ==
Season	Short program	Free skating
2009–10	Christmas Eve in Sarajevo by Metallica, Trans-Siberian Orchestra	Madagascar: Escape 2 Africa
2008–09	Christmas Eve in Sarajevo by Metallica, Trans-Siberian Orchestra	West Side Story by Leonard Bernstein
2007–08	Don Pasquale by Gaetano Donizetti	West Side Story by Leonard Bernstein
2005–06	Saggitair by René Aubry	West Side Story by Leonard Bernstein
2004–05	Saggitair by René Aubry	The Devil Went Down to Georgia by the Charlie Daniels Band; Short Trip Home by Edgar Meyer, Joshua Bell; The Devil Went Down to Georgia by the Charlie Daniels Band

== Competitive highlights ==
JGP: Junior Grand Prix

International
Event	02–03	03–04	04–05	05–06	06–07	07–08	08–09	09–10	10–11
Four Continents				22nd		20th	18th		
Cup of Nice							15th		
Golden Spin							21st		11th
Nebelhorn Trophy								31st	
Ondrej Nepela							23rd		
International: Junior
Junior Worlds			31st	32nd					
JGP Japan				14th					
JGP Taiwan					14th				
National
Australian Champ.	4th J	2nd J	1st J	1st J	3rd	3rd		1st	2nd
J = Junior level
