= Nicholas Fernandez =

Australian figure skater

Personal information
- Born: 8 May 1990 (age 36) Darlinghurst, New South Wales
- Home town: Cranebrook, New South Wales
- Height: 1.72 m (5 ft 8 in)

Figure skating career
- Country: Australia
- Coach: Sharryn Hollins
- Skating club: PVSFC Sydney
- Began skating: 1998
- Retired: 2012

Nicholas Fernandez (born 8 May 1990 in Darlinghurst, New South Wales) is an Australian former competitive figure skater. He is the 2008–09 season Australian national champion and competed at five Four Continents Championships.

== Programs ==
Season	Short program	Free skating
2011–12	Tango Serenata de Schubert by Buddha Bar	Jasmin; Street Passion by Didulia
2009–10	Time by Pink Floyd; Cha Cha by Balkan Beat Box	Lluvia di Primavera; Aguas de Invierno by Raúl Di Blasio
2008–09	Time by Pink Floyd; Cha Cha by Balkan Beat Box	Desert (from Xotica: Journey to the Heart) by René Dupéré
2007–08	Xena: Warrior Princess by Joseph LoDuca	Desert (from Xotica: Journey to the Heart) by René Dupéré
2006–07	Xena: Warrior Princess by Joseph LoDuca	Piano Concerto No. 1 by Pyotr Ilyich Tchaikovsky

== Competitive highlights ==
International
Event	04–05	05–06	06–07	07–08	08–09	09–10	10–11	11–12
Four Continents			16th	17th	21st	21st		24th
Merano Cup								11th
NZ Winter Games								1st
International: Junior
Junior Worlds			32nd					
JGP Bulgaria				21st				
JGP South Africa					12th			
National
Australia	5th J	5th J	1st J	2nd	1st	4th		2nd
J = Junior level; JGP = Junior Grand Prix
