= Aileen Shaw =

Australian figure skater

Personal information
- Other names: Aileen Nash
- Born: 21 May 1945 (age 81) Melbourne, Australia

Figure skating career
- Country: Australia

Aileen Shaw or Nash (born 21 May 1945) is an Australian former figure skater. She won five Australian national titles, from 1958–59 to 1961–62 and 1963–64. At the age of 14 years and 9 months, she competed at the 1960 Winter Olympics in Squaw Valley, California.

== Competitive highlights ==
International
Event	58–59	59–60	60–61	61–62	62–63	63–64
Winter Olympics		25th				
National
Australian Champ.	1st	1st	1st	1st		1st
