= Sean Carlow =

Australian figure skater

Personal information
- Born: 13 March 1985 (age 41) Sydney, Australia
- Height: 1.71 m (5 ft 7 1/2 in)

Figure skating career
- Country: Australia
- Skating club: Macquarie Ice Skating Club
- Began skating: 1987
- Retired: 2008

Sean Carlow (born 13 March 1985) is an Australian former competitive figure skater. He is a three-time Australian national champion, from the 2005–06 season to 2007–08.

== Personal life ==
Sean Carlow was born on 13 March 1985 in Sydney, Australia. He is the son of Liz Cain and nephew of Peter Cain, who competed together for Australia in pair skating at the 1980 Winter Olympics. He is the cousin of American figure skater Ashley Cain.

== Career ==
Carlow competed mainly in single skating but also appeared as a pair skater early in his career. He and Wafa Asmar won the 2001 Australian novice pairs' title.

Carlow appeared on the ISU Junior Grand Prix series from 2000 to 2003. His senior international debut came at the 2003 Four Continents Championships, where he finished 17th. He won the bronze medal at the 2003 Merano Cup.

In the 2005–06 season, Carlow became the Australian national senior champion for the first time and placed 12th at the 2006 Four Continents. He finished 13th at the 2007 Four Continents.

Carlow won his third consecutive national title in the 2007–08 season. He was unable to compete at the 2008 Four Continents due to a groin injury and ended his competitive career at the 2008 World Championships.

== Ferry disaster ==
On 28 March 2007, Carlow was injured in the Sydney Harbour fatal ferry crash where four people died. He saved the life of his mother, whose shin was severed in the accident, by diving into the water and holding on to her until rescuers arrived.

== Programs ==
| Season | Short program | Free skating |
|---|---|---|
| 2005–08 | Scott & Fran's Paso Doble (from Strictly Ballroom) performed by David Hirschfelder | The Pink Panther Theme (from The Pink Panther); The Inspector Cloiseau (from The Pink Panther Strikes Again); The Pink Panther (from Son of the Pink Panther); Shades of Sennett (from The Ultimate Pink Panther) all by Henry Mancini |
| 2004–05 | Scott & Fran's Paso Doble (from Strictly Ballroom) performed by David Hirschfelder | Pirates of the Caribbean by Klaus Badelt |
| 2003–04 | Scott & Fran's Paso Doble (from Strictly Ballroom) performed by David Hirschfelder | The Shine (from James Bond); Pod Chase; Final Family Theme; Parents on Mission; Spy Wedding (all from Spy Kids) |

== Competitive highlights ==
International
| Event | 00–01 | 01–02 | 02–03 | 03–04 | 04–05 | 05–06 | 06–07 | 07–08 |
|---|---|---|---|---|---|---|---|---|
| Worlds | | | 39th | | | 32nd | 28th | 35th |
| Four Continents | | | 17th | | 15th | 12th | 13th | |
| Merano Cup | | | | 3rd | | | | |
| Karl Schäfer | | | | | | 16th | | |
International: Junior
| Junior Worlds | | | 35th | 39th | | | | |
| JGP Bulgaria | | 15th | | | | | | |
| JGP Czech Republic | 23rd | | | | | | | |
| JGP Japan | | | | 13th | | | | |
| JGP Mexico | | | | 11th | | | | |
| JGP Slovakia | | | 18th | | | | | |
| JGP U.S. | | | 13th | | | | | |
| Grand Prize SNP | 8th | | | | | | | |
National
| Australian Champ. | 3rd J | 3rd J | 1st J | 1st J | 2nd | 1st | 1st | 1st |
J = Junior level
