= Phoebe Di Tommaso =

Australian figure skater

Personal information
- Born: 26 July 1990 (age 35) Brisbane, Australia
- Height: 1.55 m (5 ft 1 in)

Figure skating career
- Country: Australia
- Coach: Liz Cain, Gloria Pracey, Brian Orser, T. Heggen, Colin Jackson, Ekaterina Borodatova, Andrew Wang, Helen Ma
- Skating club: Sydney FSC; Macquarie Ice Skating Club; Iceworld FSC Brisbane
- Began skating: 1995
- Retired: c. 2011

Phoebe Di Tommaso (born 26 July 1990) is an Australian former competitive figure skater who won the senior national title in the 2010–11 season. She made her senior international debut at the 2007 Four Continents Championships in Colorado Springs, Colorado; she qualified for the free skate and finished 21st overall.

Di Tommaso also competed at three other Four Continents and the 2005 World Junior Championships but did not reach the final segment.

== Programs ==
Season	Short program	Free skating
2010–11	The Race by Yello	Amélie by Yann Tiersen; La valse d'Amélie; Comptine d'un autre été : L'après-midi; Sur le fil; La valse d'Amélie
2009–10	Le Jazz Hot; Drag Blues; Finale	Amélie by Yann Tiersen; La valse d'Amélie; Comptine d'un autre été : L'après-midi; Sur le fil; La valse d'Amélie
2007–08	Chicago by Kander and Ebb; All That Jazz; Hot Honey Rag	Amélie by Yann Tiersen
2006–07	Chicago by Kander and Ebb; All That Jazz; Hot Honey Rag	The Jellicle Ball by Andrew Lloyd Webber
2004–05	Sea in the Moonlight by Pyotr Ilyich Tchaikovsky	Winter by Yoad Nevo performed by Bond

== Competitive highlights ==
JGP: Junior Grand Prix

International
Event	04–05	05–06	06–07	07–08	08–09	09–10	10–11
Four Continents			21st	28th		22nd	
Nebelhorn Trophy							9th
Ondrej Nepela							12th
International: Junior
Junior Worlds	29th						
JGP South Africa					19th		
JGP Taiwan			12th				
AYOF			9th				
National
Australian Champ.	1st J		3rd J	3rd	3rd	3rd	1st
