= Nancy Burley =

Australian figure skater (1930–2013)

Personal information
- Full name: Nancy Burley
- Other names: Nancy Hallam
- Born: 8 March 1930
- Died: 7 January 2013 (aged 82)

Figure skating career
- Country: Australia

Nancy Burley (8 March 1930 – 7 January 2013) was an Australian figure skater. She represented Australia at the 1952 Winter Olympics, where she placed 14th. She and Gweneth Molony were the first ladies singles skaters to represent Australia at the Olympics.

After Burley's Olympic career she joined her previous coach Felix Kaspar in an international 'ice show'. During that time she traveled performing in ice shows in Europe and Asia.

== Personal life ==
Burley was the mother of figure skaters Sharon and Robyn Burley.

== Death ==
Nancy Burley died 7 January 2013.

== Competitive highlights ==
Event	1952
Olympics	14th
Worlds	15th
