= Tim Spencer (figure skater) =

Australian figure skater

Personal information
- Nationality: Australian
- Born: 3 June 1943 (age 81)

Sport
- Sport: Figure skating

Tim Spencer (born 3 June 1943) is an Australian figure skater. He competed in the men's singles event at the 1960 Winter Olympics.
