= Michael Pasfield =

Personal information
- Born: 1961 (age 64–65)

Figure skating career
- Country: Australia
- Coach: Jack Lee; Nita Solomon; Gretchen Black (Doolan); John Nicks; Gary Visconti; Terri Rudolf; Arthur Bourque; Ron Ludington; Ron Frank
- Began skating: May 1970
- Retired: 1982

Michael Pasfield (born c. 1961) is an Australian former competitive figure skater. He won the Australian national title in the 1980–81 and 1981–82 seasons, representing New South Wales. He competed at three World Junior Championships, finishing twice in the top ten, and at two World Championships.

Pasfield began learning to skate in May 1970 in group lessons. His coaches included Jack Lee, Nita Solomon, Gretchen Black (Doolan), John Nicks, Gary Visconti, Terri Rudolf, Arthur Bourque, Ron Ludington and Ron Frank. He was a member of the Sydney Figure Skating Club.

He is the father and coach of 2012 Australian ladies champion Zara Pasfield (born 28 June 1995 in Sydney), and Katie Pasfield (born 25 August 1998 in Sydney), a two-time Australian national bronze medallist.

== Competitive highlights ==
International
Event	75–76	76–77	77–78	78–79	79–80	80–81	81–82
Worlds						18th	26th
Ennia Challenge Cup							–
Golden Spin						4th	–
Prague Skate							–
International: Junior
Junior Worlds	14th	4th	7th				
National
Australian Champ.	1st N	1st J	2nd			1st	1st
Levels: N = Novice; J = Junior
