= David Kranjec =

Australian figure skater

Personal information
- Born: 17 August 1994 (age 31) Celje, Slovenia
- Home town: Brisbane, Australia
- Height: 1.73 m (5 ft 8 in)

Figure skating career
- Country: Slovenia
- Coach: Irina Stavrovskaia; Valentin Kadzevitch
- Skating club: Boondall IFSC
- Began skating: 1999

David Kranjec (born 17 August 1994) is a Slovenian-Australian competitive figure skater. He is the 2016 Slovenian national champion and qualified for the free skate at the 2016 European Championships.

He represented Australia until the end of the 2013–14 season, winning the 2013 national title and competing at three ISU Championships – once at the World Junior Championships and twice at the Four Continents Championships.

== Personal life ==
David Kranjec was born on 17 August 1994 in Celje, Slovenia, and resides in Brisbane, Australia.

== Career ==
Kranec placed fourth at the 2007 Slovenian Championships.

=== 2009–10 to 2013–14 ===
In the 2009–10 season, Kranjec won the junior bronze medal at the Australian Championships. He debuted on the ISU Junior Grand Prix (JGP) series in September 2011, placing 12th in Brisbane, Australia, and then 18th in Innsbruck, Austria.

In 2012–13, Kranjec won the Australian senior national title. He was sent to the 2013 Four Continents Championships in Osaka, Japan, where he finished last (23rd). At the 2013 World Junior Championships in Milan, Italy, he placed 20th of 37 skaters in the short program. He qualified for the free skate and finished 24th overall.

In the 2013–14 season, Kranjec competed at two JGP events, placing 11th in Gdańsk, Poland and 10th in Ostrava, Czech Republic. He finished second to Brendan Kerry at the Australian Championships. Making his final international appearance for Australia, he placed 21st at the 2014 Four Continents Championships.

=== 2015–16 season ===
In the 2015–16 season, Kranjec began competing internationally for Slovenia. After placing 8th at the Merano Cup, he won the bronze medal at the Golden Bear of Zagreb and took the Slovenian national title. He was assigned to the 2016 European Championships in Bratislava, Slovakia, where he qualified for the free skate.

== Programs ==
Season	Short program	Free skating
2015–2016	Who Wants to Live Forever by Queen performed by David Garrett	Tristan & Iseult by Maxime Rodriguez
2013–2014	Who Wants to Live Forever by Queen performed by David Garrett	Night on Bald Mountain by Modest Mussorgsky
2012–2013	Mission: Impossible by Lalo Schifrin	Walk This Way by Aerosmith; Live and Let Die by Paul McCartney and Wings
2011–2012	Stairway to Heaven by Led Zeppelin	Walk This Way by Aerosmith; Live and Let Die by Paul McCartney and Wings

== Competitive highlights ==
CS: ISU Challenger Series; JGP: ISU Junior Grand Prix

=== For Slovenia ===
International
Event	2006–07	2015–16
European Champ.		22nd
CS Golden Spin		18th
Dragon Trophy		2nd
Golden Bear		3rd
Merano Cup		8th
National
Slovenian Champ.	4th	1st
WD = Withdrew

=== For Australia ===
International
Event	2009–10	2011–12	2012–13	2013–14
Four Continents			23rd	21st
Skate Down Under				2nd
International: Junior
Junior Worlds			24th	
JGP Australia		12th		
JGP Austria		18th		
JGP Croatia			10th	
JGP Czech Republic				10th
JGP Poland				11th
JGP Slovenia			12th	
NZ Winter Games		2nd		
National
Australian Champ.	3rd J	2nd J	1st	2nd
J. = Junior level
