= Mark Webster (figure skater) =

Australian figure skater (born 1990)

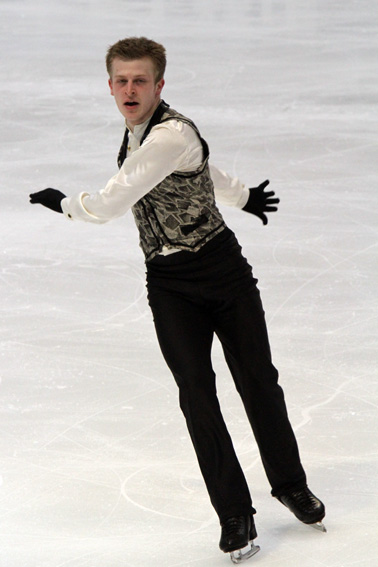
- Webster in 2011

Personal information
- Born: 21 February 1990 (age 36) Penrith, New South Wales, Australia
- Height: 1.72 m (5 ft 7 1/2 in)

Figure skating career
- Country: Australia
- Coach: Sharyn Renshaw, Elizabeth Cain, Sean Carlow
- Skating club: Penrith Valley FSC
- Began skating: 1998

Mark Webster (born 21 February 1990 in Penrith, New South Wales) is an Australian figure skater. He is the 2011 Australian national champion. He has represented Australia six times at the Four Continents Championships and three times at the World Championships. In 2010–11 he won his first senior national title by more than twenty points.

== Programs ==
Season	Short program	Free skating
2011–13	Discombobulate (from Sherlock Holmes) by Hans Zimmer	Bach 2 Part Invention in D minor by J. S. Bach; Get Off My Lawn (from "Hunting Wabbits 3") by Gordon Goodwin; Rhapsody in Blue by George Gershwin
2010–11	Discombobulate (from Sherlock Holmes) by Hans Zimmer	Wolfman by Danny Elfman; Mind Heist by Hans Zimmer
2008–10	Icegiants (from Cirque du Soleil) by Simon Carpenter	High Maintenance; Cut N Run, What Sammy Said; Attack of the Killer Tomatoes by Gordon Goodwin

== Competitive highlights ==
CS: Challenger Series

International
Event	05–06	06–07	07–08	08–09	09–10	10–11	11–12	12–13	13–14	14–15	16–17	17–18	18–19
Worlds				46th	39th	31st							
Four Continents				15th	18th	16th	20th				21st	28th	24th
CS Autumn Classic											14th		
CS Ice Challenge										9th			
CS Volvo Open Cup										16th			
CS Warsaw Cup											21st	8th	
Asian Open											7th		
Ice Challenge												4th	
Nebelhorn Trophy				24th			24th						
Ondrej Nepela								16th					
Skate Down Under									4th				
U.S. Classic								13th					
Winter Universiade									27th				
International: Junior
AYOF		8th											
National
Australian Champ.			5th	2nd	2nd	1st			3rd	4th	4th	3rd	WD
Australian Champ.	4th J	3rd J	2nd J										
J = Junior level Webster did not compete in the 2015–16 season
