= Matthew Dodds =

Australian figure skater

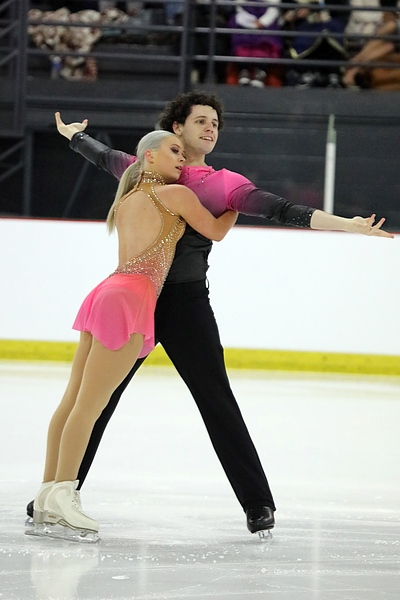

Personal information
- Born: 29 August 1989 (age 36) Gold Coast, Queensland
- Height: 1.72 m (5 ft 7 1/2 in)

Figure skating career
- Country: Australia
- Partner: Paris Stephens
- Coach: Margaret Nicholls
- Skating club: Boondall FSC
- Began skating: 1997

Matthew Dodds (born 29 August 1989) is an Australian figure skater who competes in pair skating and men's singles. As a pair skater with partner Paris Stephens, he is the 2013 Skate Down Under champion, the 2016 Volvo Open Cup silver medalist, and a four-time Australian national champion (2013-2015, 2017).

With former partner Emma Greensill, he is the 2012 Australian national champion, and the 2011 Australian junior national silver medalist.

== Competitive highlights ==
=== Pairs with Stephens ===
International
Event	13-14	14-15	15–16	16–17	17–18
CS Autumn Classic				6th	7th
CS Lombardia		4th			
CS Nebelhorn		10th	7th		
CS Ondrej Nepela			10th		
CS Tallinn Trophy					7th
CS U.S. Classic			7th	5th	9th
Asian Open Trophy				5th	4th
Asian Winter Games				7th	
Cup of Nice	10th				
MNNT Cup			8th		
Skate Down Under	1st				
Volvo Open Cup				2nd	
National
Australian Champ.	1st	1st	1st	2nd	1st

=== Pairs with Greensill ===
National
Event	12-13	13-14
Australian Champ.	2nd J	1st
J = Junior level

== Singles ==
International
Event	08-09	09-10	10-11	11-12	12-13	13-14	14-15
NZ Winter Games				4th			
National
Australian Champ.	7th J	6th J	7th	7th	8th	7th	6th
J = Junior level
