= Edrian Paul Celestino =

Filipino-Canadian figure skater

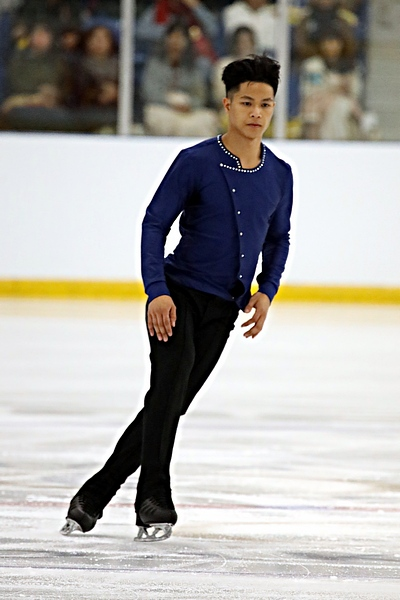
- Edrian Paul Celestino at the 2019 Autumn Classic International

Personal information
- Other names: Célestino
- Born: April 7, 1998 (age 28) Montreal, Quebec, Canada
- Height: 1.75 m (5 ft 9 in)

Figure skating career
- Country: Canada (since 2024); Philippines (2018–24); Canada (2013–18)
- Coach: Yvan Desjardins; Violaine Emard
- Began skating: 2002

Medal record
Representing Philippines
Philippine Championships
| Gold medal – first place | 2018 Pasay | Singles |
| Gold medal – first place | 2022 Pasay | Singles |

Edrian Paul Celestino (born April 7, 1998) is a Filipino-Canadian figure skater. He is the 2019 Philippine national champion, and qualified to the free skating at the 2020 Four Continents Championships. For Canada, he is the 2016 Autumn Classic International junior champion and a two-time Canadian junior national medalist (2015–16).

== Personal life ==
Celestino was born in Montreal, Quebec, on April 7, 1998. He is a model for Canadian streetwear brand Hypewearnation. Celestino's skating idols are Daisuke Takahashi, Patrick Chan, and Yuzuru Hanyu.

== Career ==
Celestino began skating in 2002. He competed for his native Canada until the 2017–18 season before switching to representing the Philippines in the following season. Celestino was also an ice dancer.

For Canada, Celestino competed on the ISU Junior Grand Prix three times, with his highest finish being ninth at 2016 JGP Russia. He is the 2016 Autumn Classic International junior champion after previously finishing fourth in 2015. Celestino is the 2014 Canadian novice national silver medalist, the 2015 Canadian junior national bronze medalist, and the 2016 Canadian junior national silver medalist. At the senior level, he finished 12th in 2017 and 18th in 2018.

=== 2018–2019 season ===
Celestino won the national title at the 2019 Philippine Championships by over 30 points ahead of Christopher Caluza and Yamato Rowe. He did not compete internationally during the season.

=== 2019–2020 season ===
Celestino debuted for the Philippines and competed internationally for the first time since the 2016–17 season by competing at three Challenger Series events. He finished eighth at the 2019 CS Ice Star and ninth at the 2019 CS Finlandia Trophy and the 2019 CS Autumn Classic International. In November 2019, Celestino finished fourth at the 2019 Southeast Asian Games, after placing third in the short program and fourth in the free skating. Despite being nervous for the competition, he told media that he found inspiration "from within [himself] and sheer love and passion for skating."

Celestino qualified to the free skating segment at the 2020 Four Continents Championships, finishing 20th overall. He failed to attain the minimum technical element scores required to compete at the 2020 World Championships in his hometown of Montreal. Celestino would have ended his season at the 2020 Philippine Championships in April; however, the competition was postponed indefinitely due to the COVID-19 pandemic in the Philippines.

=== 2021–2022 season ===
Celestino was chosen by the Philippine Skating Union over Christopher Caluza and Michael Christian Martinez, based on the results of the federation's Olympic Qualifier Evaluation, to represent the country at the 2021 CS Nebelhorn Trophy to attempt to qualify a spot for the Philippines at the 2022 Winter Olympics. He placed eighteenth, insufficient to earn a spot. He was later twenty-second at the 2022 CS Warsaw Cup.

=== 2022–2023 season ===
Celestino competed at two Challenger events, finishing sixteenth at the 2022 CS Ice Challenge and tenth at the 2022 CS Golden Spin of Zagreb. At the 2023 Four Continents Championships, he came seventeenth.

=== 2023–2024 season ===
Appearing first on the Challenger circuit, Celestino came tenth at the 2023 CS Autumn Classic International. In the next month, Celestino competed in the 2023 CS Budapest Trophy and ranked eleventh overall.

In January, Celestino competed at the 2024 Four Continents Figure Skating Championships where he placed eighteenth.

=== 2024-2025 season ===
In June, it was announced that Celestino was switching back to compete for Canada.

== Programs ==
| Season | Short program | Free skating | Exhibition |
|---|---|---|---|
| 2023–2024 | What Is Jazz by Club des Belugas choreo. by Vanessa Sauriol, Benjamin Brisebois | The Golden Age by Woodkid; Embers by Max Richter choreo. by Vanessa Sauriol, Benjamin Brisebois | |
| 2022–2023 | In This Shirt by The Irrepressibles choreo. by Milena Todaro | The Golden Age by Woodkid; Embers by Max Richter choreo. by Vanessa Sauriol, Benjamin Brisebois | Little Wooden Head (Dance Version) (from Pinocchio) by Leigh Harline and Ned Washington |
| 2021–2022 | In This Shirt by The Irrepressibles choreo. by Milena Todaro | You & Me by Aron Wright; You (Piano & Strings) by Future of Forestry choreo. by Julie Marcotte | |
| 2019–2020 | Black Magic Woman by Peter Green performed by Carlos Santana choreo. by Julie Marcotte | You & Me by Aron Wright; You (Piano & Strings) by Future of Forestry choreo. by Julie Marcotte | |
| 2018–2019 | | | |
| 2017–2018 | | | |
| 2016–2017 | That's Life by Dean Kay, Kelly Gordon performed by Frank Sinatra choreo. by Julie Marcotte | Las Cuatros Estaciones Portenas III. Winter by Astor Piazzolla choreo. by Julie Marcotte | |
| 2015–2016 | Hip Hip Chin Chin by Club des Belugas choreo. by David Wilson | Nessun dorma (from Turandot) by Giacomo Puccini choreo. by David Wilson | |
| 2014–2015 | Piano Concerto No. 2 by Sergei Rachmaninoff choreo. by Milena Todaro | Nessun dorma (from Turandot) by Giacomo Puccini choreo. by David Wilson | |

== Competitive highlights ==
=== Single skating (for the Philippines) ===
International
| Event | 18–19 | 19–20 | 21–22 | 22–23 | 23–24 |
|---|---|---|---|---|---|
| Four Continents | | 20th | | 17th | 18th |
| CS Autumn Classic | | 9th | | | 10th |
| CS Budapest Trophy | | | | | 11th |
| CS Finlandia Trophy | | 9th | | | |
| CS Golden Spin | | | | 10th | |
| CS Ice Challenge | | | | 16th | |
| CS Ice Star | | 8th | | | |
| CS Nebelhorn Trophy | | | 18th | | |
| CS Warsaw Cup | | | 22nd | | WD |
| SEA Games | | 4th | | | |
National
| Philippine Champ. | 1st | | | 1st | |

=== Single skating (for Canada) ===
International: Junior
| Event | 2014–15 | 2015–16 | 2016–17 | 2017–18 | 2024-25 |
|---|---|---|---|---|---|
| JGP Austria | | 13th | | | |
| JGP Estonia | 11th | | | | |
| JGP Russia | | | 9th | | |
| Autumn Classic | | 4th | 1st | | |
National
| Canadian Champ. | 3rd J | 2nd J | 12th | 18th | TBD |
| SC Challenge | 1st J | 7th J | 4th | 9th | |

== Detailed results ==
=== Single skating (for the Philippines) ===
2023–24 season
| Date | Event | SP | FS | Total |
| Jan. 30–Feb. 4, 2024 | 2024 Four Continents Championships | 20; 62.86 | 18; 117.45 | 18; 180.31 |
| October 13–15, 2023 | 2023 CS Budapest Trophy | 9; 65.21 | 15; 118.86 | 11; 184.07 |
| September 14–17, 2023 | 2023 CS Autumn Classic International | 10; 59.02 | 10; 118.55 | 10; 177.57 |
2022–23 season
| Date | Event | SP | FS | Total |
| February 7–12, 2023 | 2023 Four Continents Championships | 16; 66.83 | 19; 100.09 | 17; 166.92 |
| December 7–10, 2022 | 2022 CS Golden Spin of Zagreb | 5; 69.46 | 12; 107.15 | 10; 178.35 |
2021–22 season
| Date | Event | SP | FS | Total |
| November 17–20, 2021 | 2021 CS Warsaw Cup | 17; 66.58 | 22; 110.50 | 22; 177.08 |
| September 22–25, 2021 | 2021 CS Nebelhorn Trophy | 16; 64.32 | 18; 111.78 | 18; 176.10 |
2019–20 season
| Date | Event | SP | FS | Total |
| February 4–9, 2020 | 2020 Four Continents Championships | 18; 65.11 | 21; 102.54 | 20; 167.65 |
| Nov. 29 – Dec. 1, 2019 | 2019 Southeast Asian Games | 3; 61.52 | 4; 108.07 | 4; 169.59 |
| October 18–20, 2019 | 2019 CS Ice Star | 6; 64.61 | 9; 117.66 | 8; 182.27 |
| October 11–13, 2019 | 2019 CS Finlandia Trophy | 10; 61.72 | 7; 129.73 | 9; 191.45 |
| September 12–14, 2019 | 2019 CS Autumn Classic International | 9; 64.01 | 9; 115.20 | 9; 179.21 |
2018–19 season
| Date | Event | SP | FS | Total |
| November 25–26, 2018 | 2019 Philippine Championships | 1; 66.27 | 1; 130.42 | 1; 196.69 |

=== Single skating (for Canada) ===
2017–18 season
| Date | Event | Level | SP | FS | Total |
|---|---|---|---|---|---|
| January 8–14, 2018 | 2018 Canadian Championships | Senior | 18; 56.14 | 18; 97.57 | 18; 153.71 |
2016–17 season
| Date | Event | Level | SP | FS | Total |
| January 16–22, 2017 | 2017 Canadian Championships | Senior | 10; 69.41 | 12; 125.49 | 12; 194.90 |
| Sept. 28 – Oct. 1, 2016 | 2016 Autumn Classic International | Junior | 1; 59.99 | 2; 105.00 | 1; 164.99 |
| September 14–18, 2016 | 2016 JGP Russia | Junior | 12; 50.39 | 9; 111.30 | 9; 161.69 |
2015–16 season
| Date | Event | Level | SP | FS | Total |
| January 18–24, 2016 | 2016 Canadian Championships | Junior | 2; 56.27 | 2; 123.17 | 2; 179.92 |
| October 12–15, 2015 | 2015 Autumn Classic International | Junior | 2; 53.37 | 4; 84.02 | 4; 137.39 |
| September 9–12, 2015 | 2015 JGP Austria | Junior | 17; 46.55 | 13; 97.89 | 13; 144.44 |
2014–15 season
| Date | Event | Level | SP | FS | Total |
| January 19–25, 2015 | 2015 Canadian Championships | Junior | 3; 58.24 | 4; 114.44 | 3; 172.68 |
| September 24–27, 2014 | 2014 JGP Estonia | Junior | 15; 45.17 | 10; 96.63 | 11; 141.80 |
