= 2019 CS Finlandia Trophy =

Figure skating competition

- Type: ISU Challenger Series
- Date: October 11 – 13
- Season: 2019–20
- Location: Espoo
- Host: Finnish Figure Skating Association
- Venue: Espoo Metro Areena

Champions
- Men's singles: (Japan) Shoma Uno
- Ladies' singles: (Russia) Alena Kostornaia
- Pairs: (Russia) Anastasia Mishina / Aleksandr Galliamov
- Ice dance: (United States) Madison Chock / Evan Bates
- Previous: 2018 CS Finlandia Trophy
- Next: 2021 CS Finlandia Trophy

The 2019 CS Finlandia Trophy was held in October 2019 in Espoo. It was part of the 2019–20 ISU Challenger Series. Medals were awarded in the disciplines of men's singles, ladies' singles, pair skating, and ice dance.

== Entries ==
The International Skating Union published the list on entries on September 19, 2019.

Country	Men	Ladies	Pairs	Ice dance
Austria			Miriam Ziegler / Severin Kiefer	
Belarus	Yakau Zenko			
Canada	Roman Sadovsky	Gabrielle Daleman	Liubov Ilyushechkina / Charlie Bilodeau; Evelyn Walsh / Trennt Michaud	Marjorie Lajoie / Zachary Lagha
China				Wang Shiyue / Liu Xinyu
Czech Republic		Nikola Rychtarikova		
Estonia	Aleksandr Selevko	Eva-Lotta Kiibus		
Finland	Roman Galay; Valtter Virtanen	Linnea Ceder; Jenni Saarinen; Vera Stolt; Sofia Sula		Yuka Orihara / Juho Pirinen
France	Luc Economides; Philip Warren	Alizée Crozet	Cléo Hamon / Denys Strekalin	
Germany	Catalin Dimitrescu; Jonathan Hess	Kristina Isaev		
Hungary			Ioulia Chtchetinina / Márk Magyar	Leia Dozzi / Michael Albert Valdez; Emily Monaghan / Ilias Fourati
Japan	Shoma Uno; Sōta Yamamoto	Yuhana Yokoi		
Lithuania				Allison Reed / Saulius Ambrulevičius
Mongolia		Maral-Erdene Gansukh		
Netherlands		Niki Wories	Daria Danilova / Michel Tsiba	
Philippines	Christopher Caluza; Edrian Paul Celestino	Alisson Krystle Perticheto	Isabella Gamez / David-Alexandre Paradis	
Russia	Andrei Lazukin; Sergei Voronov	Alena Kostornaia; Elizaveta Tuktamysheva	Alisa Efimova / Alexander Korovin; Anastasia Mishina / Aleksandr Galliamov	Betina Popova / Sergey Mozgov; Anastasia Shpilevaya / Grigory Smirnov
South Korea		Sara Hong		
Sweden		Josefin Taljegård		
Switzerland	Tomas Llorenc Guarino Sabate; Nicola Todeschini	Tanja Odermatt	Alexandra Herbríková / Nicolas Roulet	
United Kingdom		Nina Povey		
United States	Jimmy Ma	Starr Andrews; Megan Wessenberg	Olivia Serafini / Mervin Tran	Madison Chock / Evan Bates

=== Changes to preliminary assignments ===
Date	Discipline	Withdrew	Added	Reason/Other notes	Refs
September 19	Men	(Russia) Mikhail Kolyada		Illness	
September 19	Ice dance	(Russia) Anastasia Skoptcova / Kirill Aleshin			
September 24	Pairs	(Russia) Aleksandra Boikova / Dmitrii Kozlovskii	(Russia) Alisa Efimova / Alexander Korovin		
September 24	Pairs	(Italy) Vivienne Contarino / Marco Pauletti			
October 2	Ladies	(Germany) Lea Johanna Dastich			
October 2	Pairs	(United States) Audrey Lu / Misha Mitrofanov			
October 2	Ice dance	(Finland) Juulia Turkkila / Matthias Versluis		Injury (Turkkila)	
October 4	Men	(Czech Republic) Jiří Bělohradský			
October 4	Men	(Norway) Sondre Oddvoll Bøe			
October 4	Ladies	(Finland) Viveca Lindfors	(Finland) Vera Stolt		
October 4	Pairs	N/A	(Philippines) Isabella Gamez / David-Alexandre Paradis		
October 4	Ice dance	(United States) Lorraine McNamara / Quinn Carpenter		Injury	
October 5	Ladies	(Russia) Sofia Samodurova			
October 7	Ladies	(Sweden) Anita Östlund	(Sweden) Josefin Taljegård		
October 7	Ladies	(United States) Ting Cui	(Finland) Linnea Ceder	Injury	
October 9	Men	(Malaysia) Chew Kai Xiang			
October 11	Ice dance	(Germany) Jennifer Urban / Benjamin Steffan			
October 11	Ice dance	(Italy) Chiara Calderone / Pietro Papetti			

== Results ==
=== Men ===
Rank	Name	Nation	Total points	SP		FS	
1	Shoma Uno	Japan	255.23	2	92.28	1	162.95
2	Sōta Yamamoto	Japan	223.24	1	92.81	6	130.43
3	Roman Sadovsky	Canada	222.23	3	86.34	4	135.89
4	Jimmy Ma	United States	213.49	8	66.48	2	147.01
5	Aleksandr Selevko	Estonia	206.81	7	67.63	3	139.18
6	Sergei Voronov	Russia	206.19	4	79.48	9	126.71
7	Andrei Lazukin	Russia	203.91	5	75.59	8	128.32
8	Roman Galay	Finland	193.11	11	61.19	5	131.92
9	Edrian Paul Celestino	Philippines	191.45	10	61.72	7	129.73
10	Christopher Caluza	Philippines	187.43	9	65.92	12	121.51
11	Jonathan Hess	Germany	183.49	12	60.73	10	122.76
12	Nicola Todeschini	Switzerland	171.84	14	59.31	13	112.53
13	Luc Economides	France	169.76	6	69.82	16	99.94
14	Philip Warren	France	165.71	18	43.46	11	122.25
15	Yakau Zenko	Belarus	163.92	16	55.31	15	108.61
16	Tomas Llorenc Guarino Sabate	Switzerland	157.11	17	48.41	14	108.70
17	Valtter Virtanen	Finland	155.43	15	58.13	17	97.30
18	Catalin Dimitrescu	Germany	141.69	13	60.17	18	81.52

=== Ladies ===
Rank	Name	Nation	Total points	SP		FS	
1	Alena Kostornaia	Russia	234.84	1	77.25	1	157.59
2	Elizaveta Tuktamysheva	Russia	212.53	2	72.66	2	139.87
3	Yuhana Yokoi	Japan	191.90	3	65.09	3	126.81
4	Jenni Saarinen	Finland	181.20	4	60.06	4	121.14
5	Starr Andrews	United States	169.10	6	57.25	5	111.85
6	Eva-Lotta Kiibus	Estonia	162.77	5	59.84	6	102.93
7	Linnea Ceder	Finland	151.48	7	53.25	8	98.23
8	Megan Wessenberg	United States	148.21	9	51.07	9	97.14
9	Sofia Sula	Finland	147.41	13	47.09	7	100.32
10	Josefin Taljegård	Sweden	143.74	8	51.28	12	92.46
11	Tanja Odermatt	Switzerland	142.79	11	48.74	10	94.05
12	Vera Stolt	Finland	141.35	10	50.31	13	91.04
13	Gabrielle Daleman	Canada	138.89	15	45.82	11	93.07
14	Nina Povey	United Kingdom	131.77	14	46.33	14	85.44
15	Alisson Krystle Perticheto	Philippines	122.86	18	39.77	15	83.09
16	Nikola Rychtarikova	Czech Republic	118.33	16	43.20	17	75.13
17	Niki Wories	Netherlands	117.62	12	48.40	18	69.22
18	Kristina Isaev	Germany	112.30	20	34.55	16	77.75
19	Sara Hong	South Korea	105.61	19	38.59	19	67.02
20	Alizée Crozet	France	102.33	17	40.91	20	61.42
21	Maral-Erdene Gansukh	Mongolia	70.79	21	23.57	21	47.22

=== Pairs ===
Rank	Name	Nation	Total points	SP		FS	
1	Anastasia Mishina / Aleksandr Galliamov	Russia	210.18	1	74.99	1	135.19
2	Alisa Efimova / Alexander Korovin	Russia	194.28	2	69.12	3	125.16
3	Liubov Ilyushechkina / Charlie Bilodeau	Canada	193.58	3	68.07	2	125.51
4	Miriam Ziegler / Severin Kiefer	Austria	167.44	5	54.09	4	113.35
5	Olivia Serafini / Mervin Tran	United States	167.08	4	60.24	5	106.84
6	Evelyn Walsh / Trennt Michaud	Canada	151.72	8	48.03	6	103.69
7	Cléo Hamon / Denys Strekalin	France	148.48	7	53.53	7	94.95
8	Ioulia Chtchetinina / Márk Magyar	Hungary	148.35	6	53.67	8	94.68
9	Isabella Gamez / David-Alexandre Paradis	Philippines	124.70	10	43.09	10	81.61
10	Daria Danilova / Michel Tsiba	Netherlands	118.90	9	43.56	10	75.34
11	Alexandra Herbríková / Nicolas Roulet	Switzerland	111.63	11	41.25	11	70.38

=== Ice dance ===
Rank	Name	Nation	Total points	RD		FD	
1	Madison Chock / Evan Bates	United States	198.26	1	78.80	1	119.46
2	Wang Shiyue / Liu Xinyu	China	183.09	3	71.68	2	111.41
3	Betina Popova / Sergey Mozgov	Russia	175.24	2	72.11	3	103.13
4	Marjorie Lajoie / Zachary Lagha	Canada	173.69	4	70.75	4	102.94
5	Allison Reed / Saulius Ambrulevičius	Lithuania	168.33	5	70.61	6	97.72
6	Anastasia Shpilevaya / Grigory Smirnov	Russia	165.81	6	68.04	5	97.77
7	Yuka Orihara / Juho Pirinen	Finland	157.72	7	62.19	7	95.53
8	Leia Dozzi / Michael Valdez	Hungary	133.38	8	52.63	8	80.75
9	Emily Monaghan / Ilias Fourati	Hungary	131.44	9	52.01	9	79.43
