= 2020 Four Continents Figure Skating Championships =

22nd Four Continents figure skating competition

2020 Four Continents Championships
- Type: ISU Championship
- Date: February 4 – 9
- Season: 2019–20
- Location: Seoul, South Korea
- Host: Korean Skating Union
- Venue: Mokdong Ice Rink

Champions
- Men's singles: (Japan) Yuzuru Hanyu
- Ladies' singles: (Japan) Rika Kihira
- Pairs: (China) Sui Wenjing / Han Cong
- Ice dance: (United States) Madison Chock / Evan Bates
- Previous: 2019 Four Continents Championships
- Next: 2022 Four Continents Championships

The 2020 Four Continents Figure Skating Championships were held on February 4–9, 2020 in Seoul, South Korea. Held annually since 1999, the competition featured skaters from the Americas, Asia, Africa, and Oceania. Medals were awarded in the disciplines of men's singles, ladies' singles, pair skating, and ice dance.

== Qualification ==
=== Age and minimum TES requirements ===
The competition is open to skaters from all non-European member nations of the International Skating Union. The corresponding competition for European skaters is the 2020 European Figure Skating Championships.

Skaters are eligible for the 2020 Four Continents Championships if they turned 15 years of age before July 1, 2019 and have met the minimum technical elements score requirements. The ISU accepts scores if they were obtained at senior-level ISU-recognized international competitions at least 21 days before the first official practice day of the championships.

Minimum technical scores (TES)
| Discipline | SP / RD | FS / FD |
| Men | 28 | 46 |
| Ladies | 23 | 40 |
| Pairs | 25 | 42 |
| Ice dance | 28 | 44 |
|---|---|---|
Must be achieved at an ISU-recognized international event in the ongoing or preceding season. SP/RD and FS/FD scores may be attained at different events.

=== Number of entries per discipline ===
Each qualifying member nation may have up to three entries per discipline.

== Entries ==
Member nations began announcing their selections in December 2019. The International Skating Union published a complete list of entries on January 16, 2020.

| Country | Men | Ladies | Pairs | Ice dance |
|---|---|---|---|---|
| Australia | Jordan Dodds; Brendan Kerry; James Min | Kailani Craine | | Matilda Friend / William Badaoui; Holly Harris / Jason Chan; Chantelle Kerry / Andrew Dodds |
| Canada | Keegan Messing; Nam Nguyen; Roman Sadovsky | Emily Bausback; Alicia Pineault; Alison Schumacher | Liubov Ilyushechkina / Charlie Bilodeau; Kirsten Moore-Towers / Michael Marinaro; Evelyn Walsh / Trennt Michaud | Piper Gilles / Paul Poirier; Marjorie Lajoie / Zachary Lagha; Carolane Soucisse / Shane Firus |
| China | Jin Boyang; Yan Han; Zhang He | Chen Hongyi; Zhu Yi | Peng Cheng / Jin Yang; Sui Wenjing / Han Cong; Tang Feiyao / Yang Yongchao | Chen Hong / Sun Zhuoming; Ning Wanqi / Wang Chao; Wang Shiyue / Liu Xinyu |
| Chinese Taipei | Micah Tang; Tsao Chih-i | Amy Lin; Jenny Shyu | | |
| Hong Kong | Harrison Jon-Yen Wong | Cheuk Ka Kahlen Cheung | | |
| Japan | Yuzuru Hanyu; Yuma Kagiyama; Kazuki Tomono | Wakaba Higuchi; Rika Kihira; Kaori Sakamoto | Riku Miura / Ryuichi Kihara | Rikako Fukase / Eichu Cho; Misato Komatsubara / Tim Koleto |
| Kazakhstan | | Aiza Mambekova | | Maxine Weatherby / Temirlan Yerzhanov |
| Mexico | Donovan Carrillo | Andrea Montesinos Cantú | | |
| Philippines | Christopher Caluza; Edrian Paul Celestino | Alisson Krystle Perticheto | Isabella Gamez / David-Alexandre Paradis | |
| South Korea | Cha Jun-hwan; Lee June-hyoung; Lee Si-hyeong | Kim Ye-lim; Lim Eun-soo; You Young | | Yura Min / Daniel Eaton |
| Thailand | Micah Kai Lynette | | | |
| United States | Jason Brown; Tomoki Hiwatashi; Camden Pulkinen | Karen Chen; Amber Glenn; Bradie Tennell | Jessica Calalang / Brian Johnson; Tarah Kayne / Danny O'Shea; Alexa Scimeca Knierim / Chris Knierim | Madison Chock / Evan Bates; Kaitlin Hawayek / Jean-Luc Baker; Madison Hubbell / Zachary Donohue |

=== Changes to preliminary assignments ===
| Date | Discipline | Withdrew | Added | Reason/Other notes | Refs |
|---|---|---|---|---|---|
| January 22, 2020 | Pairs | (Australia) Ekaterina Alexandrovskaya / Harley Windsor | N/A | | |
| February 2, 2020 | Ladies | (Hong Kong) Yi Christy Leung | N/A | | |
| February 2, 2020 | Ladies | (Singapore) Chloe Ing | N/A | | |

== Medal summary ==
=== Medalists ===
Medals awarded to the skaters who achieve the highest overall placements in each discipline:

| Discipline | Gold | Silver | Bronze |
|---|---|---|---|
| Men | (Japan) Yuzuru Hanyu | (United States) Jason Brown | (Japan) Yuma Kagiyama |
| Ladies | (Japan) Rika Kihira | (South Korea) You Young | (United States) Bradie Tennell |
| Pairs | (China) Sui Wenjing / Han Cong | (China) Peng Cheng / Jin Yang | (Canada) Kirsten Moore-Towers / Michael Marinaro |
| Ice dance | (United States) Madison Chock / Evan Bates | (Canada) Piper Gilles / Paul Poirier | (United States) Madison Hubbell / Zachary Donohue |

Small medals awarded to the skaters who achieve the highest short program or rhythm dance placements in each discipline:

| Discipline | Gold | Silver | Bronze |
|---|---|---|---|
| Men | (Japan) Yuzuru Hanyu | (China) Jin Boyang | (United States) Jason Brown |
| Ladies | (Japan) Rika Kihira | (United States) Bradie Tennell | (South Korea) You Young |
| Pairs | (Canada) Kirsten Moore-Towers / Michael Marinaro | (China) Peng Cheng / Jin Yang | (China) Sui Wenjing / Han Cong |
| Ice dance | (United States) Madison Hubbell / Zachary Donohue | (United States) Madison Chock / Evan Bates | (Canada) Piper Gilles / Paul Poirier |

Medals awarded to the skaters who achieve the highest free skating or free dance placements in each discipline:

| Discipline | Gold | Silver | Bronze |
|---|---|---|---|
| Men | (Japan) Yuzuru Hanyu | (United States) Jason Brown | (Japan) Yuma Kagiyama |
| Ladies | (Japan) Rika Kihira | (South Korea) You Young | (United States) Bradie Tennell |
| Pairs | (China) Sui Wenjing / Han Cong | (China) Peng Cheng / Jin Yang | (United States) Jessica Calalang / Brian Johnson |
| Ice dance | (United States) Madison Chock / Evan Bates | (Canada) Piper Gilles / Paul Poirier | (United States) Madison Hubbell / Zachary Donohue |

=== Medals by country ===
Table of medals for overall placement:

* Host nation (South Korea)

| Rank | Nation | Gold | Silver | Bronze | Total |
|---|---|---|---|---|---|
| 1 | Japan | 2 | 0 | 1 | 3 |
| 2 | United States | 1 | 1 | 2 | 4 |
| 3 | China | 1 | 1 | 0 | 2 |
| 4 | Canada | 0 | 1 | 1 | 2 |
| 5 | South Korea* | 0 | 1 | 0 | 1 |
| Totals (5 entries) | | 4 | 4 | 4 | 12 |

== Records ==
The following new ISU best scores were set during this competition:

| Disc. | Skater | Segment | Score | Date | Ref. |
|---|---|---|---|---|---|
| Men's singles | (Japan) Yuzuru Hanyu | Short program | 111.82 | February 7, 2020 | |

== Results ==
=== Men ===
| Rank | Name | Nation | Total points | SP | | FS | |
|---|---|---|---|---|---|---|---|
| 1 | Yuzuru Hanyu | Japan | 299.42 | 1 | 111.82 | 1 | 187.60 |
| 2 | Jason Brown | United States | 274.82 | 3 | 94.71 | 2 | 180.11 |
| 3 | Yuma Kagiyama | Japan | 270.61 | 5 | 91.61 | 3 | 179.00 |
| 4 | Jin Boyang | China | 267.67 | 2 | 95.83 | 5 | 171.84 |
| 5 | Cha Jun-hwan | South Korea | 265.43 | 6 | 90.37 | 4 | 175.06 |
| 6 | Nam Nguyen | Canada | 251.60 | 9 | 85.24 | 6 | 166.36 |
| 7 | Kazuki Tomono | Japan | 251.05 | 7 | 88.22 | 7 | 162.83 |
| 8 | Keegan Messing | Canada | 243.93 | 4 | 94.03 | 10 | 149.90 |
| 9 | Tomoki Hiwatashi | United States | 240.78 | 8 | 88.09 | 9 | 152.69 |
| 10 | Yan Han | China | 239.41 | 11 | 82.32 | 8 | 157.09 |
| 11 | Camden Pulkinen | United States | 226.82 | 10 | 84.66 | 11 | 142.16 |
| 12 | Brendan Kerry | Australia | 213.11 | 12 | 76.70 | 14 | 136.41 |
| 13 | Zhang He | China | 210.06 | 15 | 71.58 | 12 | 138.48 |
| 14 | Lee Si-hyeong | South Korea | 203.50 | 16 | 67.00 | 13 | 136.50 |
| 15 | Donovan Carrillo | Mexico | 201.09 | 13 | 73.13 | 16 | 127.96 |
| 16 | Roman Sadovsky | Canada | 200.50 | 17 | 65.87 | 15 | 134.63 |
| 17 | Lee June-hyoung | South Korea | 198.95 | 14 | 72.74 | 17 | 126.21 |
| 18 | Christopher Caluza | Philippines | 171.45 | 20 | 60.70 | 18 | 110.75 |
| 19 | James Min | Australia | 167.81 | 21 | 59.71 | 19 | 108.10 |
| 20 | Edrian Paul Celestino | Philippines | 167.65 | 18 | 65.11 | 21 | 102.54 |
| 21 | Micah Kai Lynette | Thailand | 156.71 | 23 | 50.77 | 20 | 105.94 |
| 22 | Harrison Jon-Yen Wong | Hong Kong | 155.30 | 22 | 56.98 | 22 | 98.32 |
| 23 | Tsao Chih-i | Chinese Taipei | 152.80 | 19 | 62.50 | 24 | 90.30 |
| 24 | Jordan Dodds | Australia | 148.78 | 24 | 50.74 | 23 | 98.04 |
Did not advance to free skating
| 25 | Micah Tang | Chinese Taipei | 45.91 | 25 | 45.91 | —N/a | |

=== Ladies ===
| Rank | Name | Nation | Total points | SP | | FS | |
|---|---|---|---|---|---|---|---|
| 1 | Rika Kihira | Japan | 232.34 | 1 | 81.18 | 1 | 151.16 |
| 2 | You Young | South Korea | 223.23 | 3 | 73.55 | 2 | 149.68 |
| 3 | Bradie Tennell | United States | 222.97 | 2 | 75.93 | 3 | 147.04 |
| 4 | Wakaba Higuchi | Japan | 207.46 | 5 | 72.95 | 5 | 134.51 |
| 5 | Kaori Sakamoto | Japan | 202.79 | 4 | 73.07 | 8 | 129.72 |
| 6 | Kim Ye-lim | South Korea | 202.76 | 7 | 68.10 | 4 | 134.66 |
| 7 | Karen Chen | United States | 201.06 | 8 | 67.28 | 6 | 133.78 |
| 8 | Lim Eun-soo | South Korea | 200.59 | 6 | 68.40 | 7 | 132.19 |
| 9 | Amber Glenn | United States | 190.83 | 9 | 65.39 | 9 | 125.44 |
| 10 | Alicia Pineault | Canada | 173.55 | 10 | 57.09 | 10 | 116.46 |
| 11 | Chen Hongyi | China | 167.26 | 11 | 56.81 | 11 | 110.45 |
| 12 | Kailani Craine | Australia | 161.15 | 13 | 54.93 | 13 | 106.22 |
| 13 | Zhu Yi | China | 155.41 | 12 | 55.53 | 14 | 99.88 |
| 14 | Alison Schumacher | Canada | 150.73 | 18 | 42.55 | 12 | 108.18 |
| 15 | Emily Bausback | Canada | 147.23 | 14 | 49.10 | 15 | 98.13 |
| 16 | Andrea Montesinos Cantú | Mexico | 135.24 | 15 | 47.40 | 18 | 87.84 |
| 17 | Jenny Shyu | Chinese Taipei | 134.80 | 16 | 44.95 | 16 | 89.85 |
| 18 | Alisson Krystle Perticheto | Philippines | 129.99 | 19 | 40.67 | 17 | 89.32 |
| 19 | Cheuk Ka Kahlen Cheung | Hong Kong | 121.29 | 17 | 44.73 | 20 | 76.56 |
| 20 | Amy Lin | Chinese Taipei | 116.97 | 20 | 40.29 | 19 | 76.68 |
| 21 | Aiza Mambekova | Kazakhstan | 107.68 | 21 | 37.91 | 21 | 69.77 |

=== Pairs ===
| Rank | Name | Nation | Total points | SP | | FS | |
|---|---|---|---|---|---|---|---|
| 1 | Sui Wenjing / Han Cong | China | 217.51 | 3 | 73.17 | 1 | 144.34 |
| 2 | Peng Cheng / Jin Yang | China | 213.29 | 2 | 75.96 | 2 | 137.33 |
| 3 | Kirsten Moore-Towers / Michael Marinaro | Canada | 201.80 | 1 | 76.36 | 4 | 125.44 |
| 4 | Jessica Calalang / Brian Johnson | United States | 196.15 | 4 | 67.76 | 3 | 128.39 |
| 5 | Tarah Kayne / Danny O'Shea | United States | 186.20 | 7 | 62.65 | 5 | 123.55 |
| 6 | Evelyn Walsh / Trennt Michaud | Canada | 177.58 | 6 | 62.97 | 6 | 114.61 |
| 7 | Liubov Ilyushechkina / Charlie Bilodeau | Canada | 171.32 | 8 | 57.87 | 7 | 113.45 |
| 8 | Riku Miura / Ryuichi Kihara | Japan | 167.50 | 9 | 57.45 | 8 | 110.05 |
| 9 | Isabella Gamez / David-Alexandre Paradis | Philippines | 127.43 | 10 | 47.34 | 9 | 80.09 |
| WD | Alexa Scimeca Knierim / Chris Knierim | United States | withdrew | 5 | 63.14 | withdrew from competition | |

=== Ice dance ===
| Rank | Name | Nation | Total points | RD | | FD | |
|---|---|---|---|---|---|---|---|
| 1 | Madison Chock / Evan Bates | United States | 213.18 | 2 | 85.76 | 1 | 127.42 |
| 2 | Piper Gilles / Paul Poirier | Canada | 210.18 | 3 | 83.92 | 2 | 126.26 |
| 3 | Madison Hubbell / Zachary Donohue | United States | 208.72 | 1 | 85.95 | 3 | 122.77 |
| 4 | Wang Shiyue / Liu Xinyu | China | 196.75 | 4 | 77.45 | 4 | 119.30 |
| 5 | Marjorie Lajoie / Zachary Lagha | Canada | 192.11 | 5 | 76.43 | 6 | 115.68 |
| 6 | Kaitlin Hawayek / Jean-Luc Baker | United States | 188.49 | 7 | 71.93 | 5 | 116.56 |
| 7 | Carolane Soucisse / Shane Firus | Canada | 174.41 | 6 | 73.32 | 7 | 101.09 |
| 8 | Yura Min / Daniel Eaton | South Korea | 163.26 | 8 | 64.38 | 8 | 98.88 |
| 9 | Holly Harris / Jason Chan | Australia | 161.05 | 10 | 62.83 | 9 | 98.22 |
| 10 | Chen Hong / Sun Zhuoming | China | 158.70 | 9 | 63.22 | 11 | 95.48 |
| 11 | Misato Komatsubara / Tim Koleto | Japan | 157.20 | 11 | 61.45 | 10 | 95.75 |
| 12 | Ning Wanqi / Wang Chao | China | 145.22 | 12 | 59.18 | 12 | 86.04 |
| 13 | Rikako Fukase / Eichu Cho | Japan | 143.94 | 14 | 58.13 | 13 | 85.81 |
| 14 | Chantelle Kerry / Andrew Dodds | Australia | 143.59 | 13 | 58.30 | 14 | 85.29 |
| 15 | Matilda Friend / William Badaoui | Australia | 137.36 | 15 | 55.80 | 16 | 81.56 |
| 16 | Maxine Weatherby / Temirlan Yerzhanov | Kazakhstan | 132.27 | 16 | 50.33 | 15 | 81.94 |
