= Figure skating at the SEA Games =

]Figure skating was first included at the Southeast Asian Games in 2017. The event is held every two years. Medals are awarded in senior men's and ladies' singles. Skaters from five countries – Indonesia, Malaysia, the Philippines, Singapore, and Thailand – have won medals at the event.

== Senior results ==
=== Men's singles ===
Year	Location	Gold	Silver	Bronze	Ref.
2017	Kuala Lumpur, Malaysia	(Malaysia) Julian Yee	(Philippines) Michael Christian Martinez	(Malaysia) Chew Kai Xiang	
2019	Mandaluyong, Philippines	(Malaysia) Julian Yee	(Philippines) Christopher Caluza	(Thailand) Micah Kai Lynette	
2025	Samut Prakan, Thailand	(Malaysia) Fang Ze Zeng	(Thailand) Aaron Kulvatunyou	(Philippines) Paolo Borromeo	

=== Women's singles ===
Year	Location	Gold	Silver	Bronze	Ref.
2017	Kuala Lumpur, Malaysia	(Singapore) Yu Shuran	(Singapore) Chloe Ing	(Philippines) Alisson Krystle Perticheto	
2019	Mandaluyong, Philippines	(Singapore) Chloe Ing	(Philippines) Alisson Krystle Perticheto	(Indonesia) Savika Refa Zahira	
2025	Samut Prakan, Thailand	(Thailand) Phattaratida Kaneshige	(Philippines) Maxine Marie Bautista	(Thailand) Pimmpida Lerdpraiwan	
