= 2019 Four Continents Figure Skating Championships =

2019 Four Continents Championships
- Type: ISU Championship
- Date: February 7 – 10
- Season: 2018–19
- Location: Anaheim, California, United States
- Host: U.S. Figure Skating
- Venue: Honda Center

Champions
- Men's singles: (Japan) Shoma Uno
- Ladies' singles: (Japan) Rika Kihira
- Pairs: (China) Sui Wenjing / Han Cong
- Ice dance: (United States) Madison Chock / Evan Bates
- Previous: 2018 Four Continents Championships
- Next: 2020 Four Continents Championships

The 2019 Four Continents Figure Skating Championships were held on February 7–10, 2019 in Anaheim, California, United States. Held annually since 1999, the competition featured skaters from the Americas, Asia, Africa, and Oceania. Medals were awarded in men's singles, ladies' singles, pair skating, and ice dancing.

== Qualification ==
This competition is open to skaters from all non-European member nations of the International Skating Union. The corresponding competition for European skaters is the 2019 European Figure Skating Championships.

Skaters are eligible for the event if they reached the age of 15 before July 1, 2018. Each national federation is permitted three entries for each discipline and may choose skaters based on their own criteria, as long as the selected skaters have attained the minimum technical elements scores (TES) in accordance with ISU regulations.

=== Minimum technical element scores (TES) ===
The ISU stipulates that the minimum scores must be achieved at an ISU-recognized senior international competition in the ongoing or preceding season, no later than 21 days before the first official practice day. Due to the difference in the rules for the 2017–18 and 2018–19 seasons, the required minimum scores to enter the 2019 Four Continents Championships have been adjusted separately for scores reached in the 2017–18 and the 2018–19 season.

Minimum TES	2017/2018		2018/2019	
Discipline	SP / SD	FS / FD	SP / RD	FS / FD
Men	28.00	48.00	28.00	46.00
Ladies	22.00	39.00	23.00	40.00
Pairs	25.00	44.00	25.00	42.00
Ice dance	25.00	38.00	26.00	42.00
Minimum TES must be reached separately in each segment (not a total of the two segments). SP and FS scores may be attained at different events.

== Entries ==
The International Skating Union announced the preliminary entries on January 17, 2019.

Country	Men	Ladies	Pairs	Ice dancing
Australia	Andrew Dodds; Brendan Kerry; Mark Webster	Kailani Craine; Brooklee Han		Matilda Friend / William Badaoui; Chantelle Kerry / Andrew Dodds
Brazil		Isadora Williams		
Canada	Keegan Messing; Nicolas Nadeau; Nam Nguyen	Larkyn Austman; Alaine Chartrand; Véronik Mallet	Kirsten Moore-Towers / Michael Marinaro; Camille Ruest / Andrew Wolfe; Evelyn Walsh / Trennt Michaud	Laurence Fournier Beaudry / Nikolaj Sørensen; Piper Gilles / Paul Poirier; Kaitlyn Weaver / Andrew Poje
China	Jin Boyang; Zhang He	Chen Hongyi	Peng Cheng / Jin Yang; Sui Wenjing / Han Cong	Chen Hong / Sun Zhuoming; Ning Wanqi / Wang Chao; Wang Shiyue / Liu Xinyu
Chinese Taipei	Micah Tang	Amy Lin		
Hong Kong	Leslie Man Cheuk Ip; Harrison Jon-Yen Wong	Yi Christy Leung; Joanna So		
Japan	Keiji Tanaka; Kazuki Tomono; Shoma Uno	Rika Kihira; Mai Mihara; Kaori Sakamoto		Misato Komatsubara / Tim Koleto
Kazakhstan	Nikita Manko	Elizabet Tursynbaeva		
Malaysia	Chew Kai Xiang; Julian Yee			
Mexico	Donovan Carrillo	Andrea Montesinos Cantu		
Philippines		Alisson Krystle Perticheto		
South Korea	Cha Jun-hwan; Lee June-hyoung; Lee Si-hyeong	Kim Ha-nul; Kim Ye-lim; Lim Eun-soo		
Thailand	Micah Kai Lynette			
United States	Jason Brown; Tomoki Hiwatashi; Vincent Zhou	Mariah Bell; Ting Cui; Bradie Tennell	Ashley Cain / Timothy LeDuc; Haven Denney / Brandon Frazier; Tarah Kayne / Danny O'Shea	Madison Chock / Evan Bates; Kaitlin Hawayek / Jean-Luc Baker; Madison Hubbell / Zachary Donohue

=== Changes to preliminary assignments ===
Date	Discipline	Withdrew	Added	Reason/Other notes	Refs
January 31, 2019	Pairs	(Australia) Ekaterina Alexandrovskaya / Harley Windsor	None	Unspecified Injury	
January 31, 2019	Pairs	(North Korea) Ryom Tae-ok / Kim Ju-sik	None	No specified reason	
February 3, 2019	Pairs	(Japan) Miu Suzaki / Ryuichi Kihara	None	Concussion	
February 7, 2019	Men	(Chinese Taipei) Tsao Chih-i	None	Ankle injury	

== Records ==
The following new ISU best scores were set during this competition:

Event	Component	Skaters	Score	Date	Ref
Men	Free skating	(Japan) Shoma Uno	197.36	February 9, 2019	

== Results ==
=== Men ===
Rank	Name	Nation	Total points	SP		FS	
1	Shoma Uno	Japan	289.12	4	91.76	1	197.36
2	Jin Boyang	China	273.51	3	92.17	2	181.34
3	Vincent Zhou	United States	272.22	1	100.18	5	172.04
4	Keegan Messing	Canada	267.61	5	88.18	3	179.43
5	Jason Brown	United States	258.89	6	86.57	4	172.32
6	Cha Jun-hwan	South Korea	255.83	2	97.33	8	158.50
7	Keiji Tanaka	Japan	251.54	7	83.93	6	167.61
8	Tomoki Hiwatashi	United States	236.79	9	76.95	7	159.84
9	Brendan Kerry	Australia	224.44	10	76.81	9	147.63
10	Nam Nguyen	Canada	216.49	8	79.55	10	136.94
11	Nicolas Nadeau	Canada	209.65	11	74.44	11	135.21
12	Kazuki Tomono	Japan	206.41	12	74.16	12	132.25
13	Andrew Dodds	Australia	191.40	13	71.91	15	119.49
14	Lee June-hyoung	South Korea	188.10	16	64.19	14	123.91
15	Lee Si-hyeong	South Korea	183.98	21	56.03	13	127.95
16	Zhang He	China	179.59	15	67.38	18	112.51
17	Donovan Carrillo	Mexico	174.70	14	71.16	20	103.54
18	Micah Tang	Chinese Taipei	174.59	17	62.95	19	111.64
19	Micah Kai Lynette	Thailand	174.44	19	57.45	16	116.99
20	Julian Zhi Jie Yee	Malaysia	174.10	18	61.23	17	112.87
21	Harrison Jon-Yen Wong	Hong Kong	148.54	20	56.27	22	92.27
22	Leslie Man Cheuk Ip	Hong Kong	146.60	23	50.40	21	96.20
23	Nikita Manko	Kazakhstan	138.40	22	51.15	23	87.25
24	Mark Webster	Australia	126.41	24	50.24	24	76.17
Did not advance to free skating
25	Chew Kai Xiang	Malaysia	46.38	25	46.38	—	

=== Ladies ===
Rank	Name	Nation	Total points	SP		FS	
1	Rika Kihira	Japan	221.99	5	68.85	1	153.14
2	Elizabet Tursynbaeva	Kazakhstan	207.46	6	68.09	3	139.37
3	Mai Mihara	Japan	207.12	8	65.15	2	141.97
4	Kaori Sakamoto	Japan	206.79	2	73.36	4	133.43
5	Bradie Tennell	United States	202.07	1	73.91	5	128.16
6	Mariah Bell	United States	193.94	3	70.02	6	123.92
7	Lim Eun-soo	South Korea	191.85	4	69.14	8	122.71
8	Kim Ye-lim	South Korea	187.93	9	64.42	7	123.51
9	Véronik Mallet	Canada	170.46	12	54.97	9	115.49
10	Larkyn Austman	Canada	165.21	11	54.99	12	110.22
11	Ting Cui	United States	164.84	7	66.73	14	98.11
12	Yi Christy Leung	Hong Kong	164.79	15	53.93	11	110.86
13	Kim Ha-nul	South Korea	162.48	17	51.44	10	111.04
14	Chen Hongyi	China	150.50	13	54.44	15	96.06
15	Kailani Craine	Australia	149.52	10	60.64	17	88.88
16	Alaine Chartrand	Canada	147.54	21	45.89	13	101.65
17	Isadora Williams	Brazil	138.26	19	47.92	16	90.34
18	Alisson Krystle Perticheto	Philippines	136.97	16	51.66	19	85.31
19	Amy Lin	Chinese Taipei	134.56	20	46.99	18	87.57
20	Andrea Montesinos Cantu	Mexico	124.51	22	42.92	20	81.59
21	Joanna So	Hong Kong	117.82	18	50.00	21	67.82
WD	Brooklee Han	Australia	withdrew	14	54.22	withdrew from competition	

=== Pairs ===
Rank	Name	Nation	Total points	SP		FS	
1	Sui Wenjing / Han Cong	China	211.11	2	74.19	1	136.92
2	Kirsten Moore-Towers / Michael Marinaro	Canada	211.05	1	74.66	2	136.39
3	Peng Cheng / Jin Yang	China	205.42	3	69.48	3	135.94
4	Ashley Cain / Timothy LeDuc	United States	196.82	4	67.49	4	129.33
5	Haven Denney / Brandon Frazier	United States	184.18	7	61.71	5	122.47
6	Tarah Kayne / Danny O'Shea	United States	180.36	5	66.34	6	114.02
7	Evelyn Walsh / Trennt Michaud	Canada	159.05	6	61.91	8	97.14
8	Camille Ruest / Andrew Wolfe	Canada	158.91	8	57.38	7	101.53

=== Ice dancing ===
Rank	Name	Nation	Total points	RD		FD	
1	Madison Chock / Evan Bates	United States	207.42	2	81.17	1	126.25
2	Kaitlyn Weaver / Andrew Poje	Canada	203.93	3	80.56	3	123.37
3	Piper Gilles / Paul Poirier	Canada	202.45	4	78.05	2	124.40
4	Madison Hubbell / Zachary Donohue	United States	201.66	1	81.95	4	119.71
5	Kaitlin Hawayek / Jean-Luc Baker	United States	189.87	5	74.42	5	115.45
6	Laurence Fournier Beaudry / Nikolaj Sørensen	Canada	186.91	6	73.30	6	113.61
7	Wang Shiyue / Liu Xinyu	China	169.11	7	64.37	7	104.74
8	Chen Hong / Sun Zhuoming	China	156.89	8	59.44	8	97.45
9	Misato Komatsubara / Tim Koleto	Japan	149.14	9	54.94	9	94.20
10	Chantelle Kerry / Andrew Dodds	Australia	138.53	10	53.98	10	84.55
11	Ning Wanqi / Wang Chao	China	130.92	11	52.10	11	78.82
12	Matilda Friend / William Badaoui	Australia	118.22	12	43.64	12	74.58

== Medals summary ==
=== Medalists ===
Medals awarded to the skaters who achieve the highest overall placements in each discipline:

Discipline	Gold	Silver	Bronze
Men	(Japan) Shoma Uno	(China) Jin Boyang	(United States) Vincent Zhou
Ladies	(Japan) Rika Kihira	(Kazakhstan) Elizabet Tursynbaeva	(Japan) Mai Mihara
Pairs	(China) Sui Wenjing / Han Cong	(Canada) Kirsten Moore-Towers / Michael Marinaro	(China) Peng Cheng / Jin Yang
Ice dancing	(United States) Madison Chock / Evan Bates	(Canada) Kaitlyn Weaver / Andrew Poje	(Canada) Piper Gilles / Paul Poirier

Small medals awarded to the skaters who achieve the highest short program or rhythm dance placements in each discipline:

Discipline	Gold	Silver	Bronze
Men	(United States) Vincent Zhou	(South Korea) Cha Jun-hwan	(China) Jin Boyang
Ladies	(United States) Bradie Tennell	(Japan) Kaori Sakamoto	(United States) Mariah Bell
Pairs	(Canada) Kirsten Moore-Towers / Michael Marinaro	(China) Sui Wenjing / Han Cong	(China) Peng Cheng / Jin Yang
Ice dancing	(United States) Madison Hubbell / Zachary Donohue	(United States) Madison Chock / Evan Bates	(Canada) Kaitlyn Weaver / Andrew Poje

Small medals awarded to the skaters who achieve the highest free skating or free dance placements in each discipline:

Discipline	Gold	Silver	Bronze
Men	(Japan) Shoma Uno	(China) Jin Boyang	(Canada) Keegan Messing
Ladies	(Japan) Rika Kihira	(Japan) Mai Mihara	(Kazakhstan) Elizabet Tursynbaeva
Pairs	(China) Sui Wenjing / Han Cong	(Canada) Kirsten Moore-Towers / Michael Marinaro	(China) Peng Cheng / Jin Yang
Ice dancing	(United States) Madison Chock / Evan Bates	(Canada) Piper Gilles / Paul Poirier	(Canada) Kaitlyn Weaver / Andrew Poje

=== Medals by country ===
Table of medals for overall placement:

* Host nation (United States)

Rank	Nation	Gold	Silver	Bronze	Total
1	Japan	2	0	1	3
2	China	1	1	1	3
3	United States*	1	0	1	2
4	Canada	0	2	1	3
5	Kazakhstan	0	1	0	1
Totals (5 entries)		4	4	4	12
