= 2018 Four Continents Figure Skating Championships =

2018 Four Continents Championships
- Type: ISU Championship
- Date: January 22 – 28
- Season: 2017-18
- Location: Taipei, Taiwan
- Host: Chinese Taipei Skating Union
- Venue: Taipei Arena

Champions
- Men's singles: (China) Jin Boyang
- Ladies' singles: (Japan) Kaori Sakamoto
- Pairs: (United States) Tarah Kayne / Danny O'Shea
- Ice dance: (United States) Kaitlin Hawayek / Jean-Luc Baker
- Previous: 2017 Four Continents Championships
- Next: 2019 Four Continents Championships

The 2018 Four Continents Figure Skating Championships were held in Taipei, Taiwan on January 22–28, 2018. Medals were awarded in men's singles, ladies' singles, pair skating, and ice dance.

== Qualification ==
This competition is open to skaters from all non-European member nations of the International Skating Union. Skaters must have reached the age of 15 before July 1, 2017, to participate. The corresponding competition for European skaters is the 2018 European Figure Skating Championships.

Each National Federation from the four represented regions are permitted to send up to three skaters/couples for each discipline. National Federations can select their entries based on their own criteria, as long as the selected skater/couples attains a minimum technical elements score (TES) at an international senior event prior to the Four Continents.

=== Minimum TES ===
The ISU stipulates that the minimum scores must be achieved at an ISU-recognized senior international competition in the ongoing or preceding season, no later than 21 days before the first official practice day.

Minimum technical scores (TES)
Discipline	SP / SD	FS / FD
Men	25	45
Ladies	20	36
Pairs	20	36
Ice dance	19	29
SP and FS scores may be attained at different events.

== Entries ==
Member nations began announcing their selections in December 2017.

Country	Men	Ladies	Pairs	Ice dance
Australia	Andrew Dodds; Brendan Kerry; Mark Webster	Kailani Craine; Brooklee Han	Ekaterina Alexandrovskaya / Harley Windsor	Matilda Friend / William Badaoui; Chantelle Kerry / Andrew Dodds
Canada	Elladj Balde; Nam Nguyen; Kevin Reynolds	Alaine Chartrand; Michelle Long; Alicia Pineault	Lubov Ilyushechkina / Dylan Moscovitch; Sydney Kolodziej / Maxime Deschamps; Camille Ruest / Andrew Wolfe	Sarah Arnold / Thomas Williams; Haley Sales / Nikolas Wamsteeker; Carolane Soucisse / Shane Firus
China	Jin Boyang; Yan Han; Zhang He	Li Xiangning; Zhao Ziquan		Song Linshu / Sun Zhuoming; Wang Shiyue / Liu Xinyu
Chinese Taipei	Micah Tang; Chih-I Tsao	Amy Lin		
North Korea			Ryom Tae-ok / Kim Ju-sik	
Hong Kong	Leslie Man Cheuk Ip; Harry Hau Yin Lee; Harrison Jon-Yen Wong	Joanna So		
Japan	Takahito Mura; Keiji Tanaka; Shoma Uno	Mai Mihara; Satoko Miyahara; Kaori Sakamoto	Riku Miura / Shoya Ichihashi; Miu Suzaki / Ryuichi Kihara	Rikako Fukase / Aru Tateno; Misato Komatsubara / Timothy Koleto; Kana Muramoto / Chris Reed
Kazakhstan	Abzal Rakimgaliev; Denis Ten	Aiza Mambekova; Elizabet Tursynbayeva		
Malaysia	Kai Xiang Chew; Julian Zhi Jie Yee			
Mexico	Donovan Carrillo			
South Korea	An Geon-hyeong; Lee June-hyoung; Lee Si-hyeong	Choi Da-bin; Kim Ha-nul; Park So-youn	Kim Kyu-eun / Alex Kangchan Kam	Yura Min / Alexander Gamelin
Singapore		Chloe Ing		
Thailand	Micah Kai Lynette	Thita Lamsam; Natalie Sangkagalo		
United States	Max Aaron; Jason Brown; Grant Hochstein	Starr Andrews; Mariah Bell; Angela Wang	Ashley Cain-Gribble / Timothy LeDuc; Tarah Kayne / Danny O'Shea; Deanna Stellato / Nathan Bartholomay	Kaitlin Hawayek / Jean-Luc Baker; Lorraine McNamara / Quinn Carpenter; Rachel Parsons / Michael Parsons
Uzbekistan	Misha Ge			

=== Changes to initial assignments ===
Announced	Country	Discipline	Initial	Replacement	Reference
January 10, 2018	Singapore	Ladies	Yu Shuran	None	
January 13, 2018	United States	Men	Ross Miner	Grant Hochstein	
January 13, 2018	United States	Ladies	Ashley Wagner	Angela Wang	
January 17, 2018	Japan	Pairs	Narumi Takahashi / Ryo Shibata	None	
January 17, 2018	South Korea	Men	Cha Jun-hwan	An Geon-hyeong	
January 19, 2018	China	Pairs	Sui Wenjing / Han Cong	None	
January 19, 2018	China	Pairs	Peng Cheng / Jin Yang	None	

== Results ==
=== Men ===
Rank	Name	Nation	Total points	SP		FS	
1	Jin Boyang	China	300.95	2	100.17	1	200.78
2	Shoma Uno	Japan	297.97	1	100.49	2	197.45
3	Jason Brown	United States	269.22	4	89.78	3	179.44
4	Keiji Tanaka	Japan	260.31	3	90.68	5	169.63
5	Max Aaron	United States	255.45	6	84.15	4	171.30
6	Misha Ge	Uzbekistan	248.96	8	82.27	7	166.69
7	Kevin Reynolds	Canada	241.50	13	74.65	6	166.85
8	Elladj Balde	Canada	238.20	12	75.17	8	163.03
9	Nam Nguyen	Canada	237.52	7	84.09	10	153.43
10	Yan Han	China	227.93	5	84.74	12	143.19
11	Grant Hochstein	United States	226.39	15	70.80	9	155.59
12	Takahito Mura	Japan	225.41	10	76.66	11	148.75
13	Brendan Kerry	Australia	219.95	9	79.57	14	140.38
14	Lee June-hyoung	South Korea	211.86	16	69.93	13	141.93
15	Denis Ten	Kazakhstan	210.82	11	75.30	15	135.52
16	Julian Zhi Jie Yee	Malaysia	197.68	17	68.45	16	129.23
17	Chih-I Tsao	Chinese Taipei	195.21	14	72.57	19	122.64
18	Donovan Carrillo	Mexico	185.91	22	59.07	17	126.84
19	Zhang He	China	184.82	19	63.62	20	121.20
20	An Geon-hyeong	South Korea	180.26	23	56.67	18	123.59
21	Andrew Dodds	Australia	177.81	18	63.69	23	114.12
22	Lee Si-hyeong	South Korea	177.07	20	62.65	22	114.42
23	Abzal Rakimgaliev	Kazakhstan	175.58	21	60.77	21	114.81
24	Leslie Man Cheuk Ip	Hong Kong	150.23	24	53.80	24	96.43
Did not advance to free skating
25	Micah Kai Lynette	Thailand	53.29	25	53.29	—N/a	
26	Harrison Jon-Yen Wong	Hong Kong	52.78	26	52.78	—N/a	
27	Kai Xiang Chew	Malaysia	50.92	27	50.92	—N/a	
28	Mark Webster	Australia	49.45	28	49.45	—N/a	
29	Harry Hau Yin Lee	Hong Kong	43.98	29	43.98	—N/a	
30	Micah Tang	Chinese Taipei	43.05	30	43.05	—N/a	

=== Ladies ===
Rank	Name	Nation	Total points	SP		FS	
1	Kaori Sakamoto	Japan	214.21	2	71.34	1	142.87
2	Mai Mihara	Japan	210.57	3	69.84	2	140.73
3	Satoko Miyahara	Japan	207.02	1	71.74	3	135.28
4	Choi Da-bin	South Korea	190.23	5	62.30	4	127.93
5	Mariah Bell	United States	185.84	4	62.90	5	122.94
6	Kim Ha-nul	South Korea	173.10	6	61.15	8	111.95
7	Starr Andrews	United States	172.65	7	60.61	7	112.04
8	Alaine Chartrand	Canada	172.41	8	59.86	6	112.55
9	Angela Wang	United States	161.04	9	58.97	11	102.07
10	Li Xiangning	China	160.40	10	57.01	10	103.39
11	Park So-youn	South Korea	159.48	12	53.05	9	106.43
12	Elizabet Tursynbayeva	Kazakhstan	156.19	11	56.52	13	99.67
13	Alicia Pineault	Canada	152.81	14	51.53	12	101.28
14	Brooklee Han	Australia	150.65	13	52.29	14	98.36
15	Michelle Long	Canada	147.50	17	49.77	15	97.73
16	Kailani Craine	Australia	141.04	16	50.79	16	90.25
17	Zhao Ziquan	China	139.01	18	48.78	17	90.23
18	Amy Lin	Chinese Taipei	137.40	15	51.14	18	86.26
19	Chloe Ing	Singapore	129.70	19	45.30	20	84.40
20	Aiza Mambekova	Kazakhstan	121.00	20	36.87	19	84.53
21	Joanna So	Hong Kong	107.69	21	35.51	21	72.18
22	Natalie Sangkagalo	Thailand	93.61	22	33.50	22	60.11
23	Thita Lamsam	Thailand	79.33	23	28.26	23	51.07

=== Pairs ===
Rank	Name	Nation	Total points	SP		FS	
1	Tarah Kayne / Danny O'Shea	United States	194.42	3	65.74	1	128.68
2	Ashley Cain-Gribble / Timothy LeDuc	United States	190.61	1	66.76	2	123.85
3	Ryom Tae-ok / Kim Ju-sik	North Korea	184.98	4	65.25	3	119.73
4	Lubov Ilyushechkina / Dylan Moscovitch	Canada	179.00	5	64.50	5	114.50
5	Deanna Stellato / Nathan Bartholomay	United States	178.38	6	60.93	4	117.45
6	Ekaterina Alexandrovskaya / Harley Windsor	Australia	178.10	2	66.45	6	111.65
7	Camille Ruest / Andrew Wolfe	Canada	159.73	9	54.70	7	105.03
8	Miu Suzaki / Ryuichi Kihara	Japan	157.27	7	56.95	8	100.32
9	Sydney Kolodziej / Maxime Deschamps	Canada	153.57	8	56.18	9	97.39
10	Riku Miura / Shoya Ichihashi	Japan	126.19	10	44.25	10	81.94
WD	Kim Kyu-eun / Alex Kangchan Kam	South Korea	withdrew from competition				

=== Ice dance ===
Rank	Name	Nation	Total points	SD		FD	
1	Kaitlin Hawayek / Jean-Luc Baker	United States	174.29	1	69.08	1	105.21
2	Carolane Soucisse / Shane Firus	Canada	164.96	3	65.11	2	99.85
3	Kana Muramoto / Chris Reed	Japan	163.86	2	65.27	3	98.59
4	Lorraine McNamara / Quinn Carpenter	United States	160.12	4	62.83	4	97.29
5	Wang Shiyue / Liu Xinyu	China	158.21	5	62.36	5	95.85
6	Rachel Parsons / Michael Parsons	United States	155.30	6	60.18	6	95.12
7	Yura Min / Alexander Gamelin	South Korea	151.38	7	60.11	7	91.27
8	Sarah Arnold / Thomas Williams	Canada	140.10	9	52.50	8	87.60
9	Haley Sales / Nikolas Wamsteeker	Canada	139.48	8	57.21	10	82.27
10	Misato Komatsubara / Timothy Koleto	Japan	138.18	10	52.45	9	85.73
11	Rikako Fukase / Aru Tateno	Japan	124.02	12	47.15	11	76.87
12	Song Linshu / Sun Zhuoming	China	122.53	11	50.34	12	72.19
13	Chantelle Kerry / Andrew Dodds	Australia	115.62	13	45.42	13	70.20
14	Matilda Friend / William Badaoui	Australia	92.05	14	33.09	14	58.96

== Medals summary ==
=== Medalists ===
Medals for overall placement:

Discipline	Gold	Silver	Bronze
Men	(China) Jin Boyang	(Japan) Shoma Uno	(United States) Jason Brown
Ladies	(Japan) Kaori Sakamoto	(Japan) Mai Mihara	(Japan) Satoko Miyahara
Pairs	(United States) Tarah Kayne / Danny O'Shea	(United States) Ashley Cain-Gribble / Timothy LeDuc	(North Korea) Ryom Tae-ok / Kim Ju-sik
Ice dance	(United States) Kaitlin Hawayek / Jean-Luc Baker	(Canada) Carolane Soucisse / Shane Firus	(Japan) Kana Muramoto / Chris Reed

Small medals for placement in the short segment:

Discipline	Gold	Silver	Bronze
Men	(Japan) Shoma Uno	(China) Jin Boyang	(Japan) Keiji Tanaka
Ladies	(Japan) Satoko Miyahara	(Japan) Kaori Sakamoto	(Japan) Mai Mihara
Pairs	(United States) Ashley Cain-Gribble / Timothy LeDuc	(Australia) Ekaterina Alexandrovskaya / Harley Windsor	(United States) Tarah Kayne / Danny O'Shea
Ice dance	(United States) Kaitlin Hawayek / Jean-Luc Baker	(Japan) Kana Muramoto / Chris Reed	(Canada) Carolane Soucisse / Shane Firus

Small medals for placement in the free segment:

Discipline	Gold	Silver	Bronze
Men	(China) Jin Boyang	(Japan) Shoma Uno	(United States) Jason Brown
Ladies	(Japan) Kaori Sakamoto	(Japan) Mai Mihara	(Japan) Satoko Miyahara
Pairs	(United States) Tarah Kayne / Danny O'Shea	(United States) Ashley Cain-Gribble / Timothy LeDuc	(North Korea) Ryom Tae-ok / Kim Ju-sik
Ice dance	(United States) Kaitlin Hawayek / Jean-Luc Baker	(Canada) Carolane Soucisse / Shane Firus	(Japan) Kana Muramoto / Chris Reed

=== Medals by country ===
Table of medals for overall placement:

Rank	Nation	Gold	Silver	Bronze	Total
1	United States (USA)	2	1	1	4
2	Japan (JPN)	1	2	2	5
3	China (CHN)	1	0	0	1
4	Canada (CAN)	0	1	0	1
5	North Korea (PRK)	0	0	1	1
Totals (5 entries)		4	4	4	12

== See also ==
- List of sporting events in Taiwan
