= 2017 Four Continents Figure Skating Championships =

2017 Four Continents Championships
- Type: ISU Championship
- Date: February 15 – 19
- Season: 2016–17
- Location: Gangneung, South Korea
- Host: Korea Skating Union
- Venue: Gangneung Ice Arena

Champions
- Men's singles: (United States) Nathan Chen
- Ladies' singles: (Japan) Mai Mihara
- Pairs: (China) Sui Wenjing / Han Cong
- Ice dance: (Canada) Tessa Virtue / Scott Moir
- Previous: 2016 Four Continents Championships
- Next: 2018 Four Continents Championships

The 2017 Four Continents Figure Skating Championships was an international figure skating competition in the 2016–17 figure skating season. It was held at the Gangneung Ice Arena in Gangneung, South Korea on February 16–19. Medals were awarded in the disciplines of men's singles, ladies' singles, pair skating, and ice dancing. The competition served as the figure skating test event for the 2018 Winter Olympics in Pyeongchang.

== Qualification ==
The competition was open to skaters from non-European member nations of the International Skating Union who reached the age of 15 before July 1, 2016. The corresponding competition for European skaters was the 2017 European Figure Skating Championships.

Each National Federation from the four represented regions were permitted to send up to three skaters/couples for each discipline. National Federations could select their entries based on their own criteria, as long as the selected skater/couples attained a minimum technical elements score (TES) at an international senior event prior to the Four Continents.

=== Minimum TES ===
Minimum technical scores (TES)
| Discipline | SP / SD | FS / FD |
| Men | 25 | 45 |
| Ladies | 20 | 36 |
| Pairs | 20 | 36 |
| Ice dance | 19 | 29 |
|---|---|---|
Must be achieved at an ISU-recognized international event in the ongoing or preceding season. SP and FS scores may be attained at different events.

== Entries ==
A total of 111 athletes (26 men, 23 ladies, 15 pair teams, and 16 ice dancing teams) competed at the championship. The ISU published a list of entries on 27 January:

| Country | Men | Ladies | Pairs | Ice dancing |
|---|---|---|---|---|
| Australia | Andrew Dodds; Brendan Kerry; Mark Webster | Kailani Craine; Brooklee Han | Ekaterina Alexandrovskaya / Harley Windsor | Matilda Friend / William Badaoui; Kimberley Hew-Low / Timothy McKernan; Adele Morrison / Demid Rokachev |
| Canada | Patrick Chan; Kevin Reynolds; Nam Nguyen | Alaine Chartrand; Gabrielle Daleman; Kaetlyn Osmond | Meagan Duhamel / Eric Radford; Lubov Ilyushechkina / Dylan Moscovitch; Kirsten Moore-Towers / Michael Marinaro | Tessa Virtue / Scott Moir; Piper Gilles / Paul Poirier; Kaitlyn Weaver / Andrew Poje |
| China | Jin Boyang; Yan Han | Li Xiangning; Li Zijun; Zhao Ziquan | Peng Cheng / Jin Yang; Sui Wenjing / Han Cong; Yu Xiaoyu / Zhang Hao | Chen Hong / Zhao Yan; Song Linshu / Sun Zhuoming; Wang Shiyue / Liu Xinyu |
| Chinese Taipei | Micah Tang; Chih-I Tsao | Amy Lin | | |
| Hong Kong | Leslie Man Cheuk Ip; Harry Hau Yin Lee; Harrison Jon-Yen Wong | Maisy Hiu Ching Ma | | |
| Japan | Yuzuru Hanyu; Shoma Uno; Keiji Tanaka | Wakaba Higuchi; Rika Hongo; Mai Mihara | Sumire Suto / Francis Boudreau Audet; Miu Suzaki / Ryuichi Kihara | Emi Hirai / Marien de la Asuncion; Kana Muramoto / Chris Reed |
| Kazakhstan | | Elizabet Tursynbayeva | | |
| Malaysia | Kai Xiang Chew; Julian Zhi Jie Yee | | | |
| Philippines | Michael Christian Martinez | | | |
| South Korea | Kim Jin-seo; Lee June-hyoung; Lee Si-Hyeong | Choi Da-bin; Kim Na-hyun; Son Suh-hyun | Ji Min-ji / Themistocles Leftheris; Kim Kyu-eun / Alex Kang-chan Kam; Kim Su-yeon / Kim Hyung-tae | Lee Ho-jung / Richard Kang-in Kam; Yura Min / Alexander Gamelin |
| Singapore | | Chloe Ing; Yu Shuran | | |
| South Africa | | Michaela du Toit | | |
| United States | Jason Brown; Nathan Chen; Grant Hochstein | Mariah Bell; Karen Chen; Mirai Nagasu | Ashley Cain / Timothy LeDuc; Haven Denney / Brandon Frazier; Alexa Scimeca Knierim / Chris Knierim | Madison Chock / Evan Bates; Madison Hubbell / Zachary Donohue; Maia Shibutani / Alex Shibutani |
| Uzbekistan | Misha Ge | | | |

=== Changes to initial assignments ===
| Announced | Country | Discipline | Initial | Replacement | Reason/Other notes |
|---|---|---|---|---|---|
| February 7, 2017 | Kazakhstan | Men | Abzal Rakimgaliev | N/A | |
| February 7, 2017 | Japan | Ladies | Satoko Miyahara | Rika Hongo | Stress fracture |
| February 9, 2017 | Kazakhstan | Men | Denis Ten | N/A | |

== Competition schedule ==
All times are Korea Standard Time (UTC+9).

| Discipline | Event | Start |
Thursday, 16 February
| Ice Dancing | Short dance | 11:00 |
| Pairs | Short program | 14:15 |
| | Opening ceremony | 17:30 |
| Ladies | Short program | 18:30 |
Friday, 17 February
| Ice dancing | Free dance | 13:30 |
| Ice dancing | Victory ceremony | 16:20 |
| Men | Short program | 17:45 |
Saturday, 18 February
| Pairs | Free skating | 14:00 |
| Pairs | Victory ceremony | 16:55 |
| Ladies | Free skating | 18:00 |
| Ladies | Victory ceremony | 21:50 |
Sunday, 19 February
| Men | Free skating | 11:00 |
| Men | Victory ceremony | 15:10 |
| | Exhibition gala | 17:30 |

== Results ==
=== Men ===
The last warm-up group in Men's free skating

| Rank | Name | Nation | Total points | SP | | FS | |
|---|---|---|---|---|---|---|---|
| 1 | Nathan Chen | United States | 307.46 | 1 | 103.12 | 2 | 204.34 |
| 2 | Yuzuru Hanyu | Japan | 303.71 | 3 | 97.04 | 1 | 206.67 |
| 3 | Shoma Uno | Japan | 288.05 | 2 | 100.28 | 3 | 187.77 |
| 4 | Patrick Chan | Canada | 267.98 | 5 | 88.46 | 4 | 179.52 |
| 5 | Jin Boyang | China | 267.51 | 4 | 91.33 | 5 | 176.18 |
| 6 | Jason Brown | United States | 245.85 | 9 | 80.77 | 6 | 165.08 |
| 7 | Misha Ge | Uzbekistan | 239.41 | 8 | 81.85 | 8 | 157.56 |
| 8 | Nam Nguyen | Canada | 237.08 | 13 | 72.99 | 7 | 164.09 |
| 9 | Grant Hochstein | United States | 235.72 | 7 | 81.94 | 9 | 153.78 |
| 10 | Yan Han | China | 235.45 | 6 | 84.08 | 10 | 151.37 |
| 11 | Brendan Kerry | Australia | 227.39 | 10 | 78.11 | 11 | 149.28 |
| 12 | Kevin Reynolds | Canada | 222.31 | 12 | 76.36 | 12 | 145.95 |
| 13 | Keiji Tanaka | Japan | 220.18 | 11 | 77.55 | 13 | 142.63 |
| 14 | Michael Christian Martinez | Philippines | 214.15 | 14 | 72.47 | 14 | 141.68 |
| 15 | Julian Zhi Jie Yee | Malaysia | 202.67 | 15 | 72.21 | 16 | 130.46 |
| 16 | Lee Si-hyeong | South Korea | 195.72 | 17 | 65.40 | 17 | 130.32 |
| 17 | Kim Jin-seo | South Korea | 195.05 | 18 | 64.26 | 15 | 130.79 |
| 18 | Lee June-hyoung | South Korea | 187.58 | 16 | 67.55 | 18 | 120.03 |
| 19 | Chih-I Tsao | Chinese Taipei | 169.63 | 22 | 51.02 | 19 | 118.61 |
| 20 | Andrew Dodds | Australia | 162.05 | 19 | 60.17 | 21 | 101.88 |
| 21 | Mark Webster | Australia | 160.03 | 20 | 54.92 | 20 | 105.11 |
| 22 | Leslie Man Cheuk Ip | Hong Kong | 146.74 | 21 | 52.86 | 22 | 93.88 |
| 23 | Kai Xiang Chew | Malaysia | 138.46 | 23 | 47.38 | 23 | 91.08 |
| 24 | Micah Tang | Chinese Taipei | 135.79 | 24 | 46.41 | 24 | 89.38 |
did not advance to Free Skating
| 25 | Harry Hau Yin Lee | Hong Kong | — | 25 | 45.27 | — | |
| 26 | Harrison Jon-Yen Wong | Hong Kong | — | 26 | 45.12 | — | |

=== Ladies ===
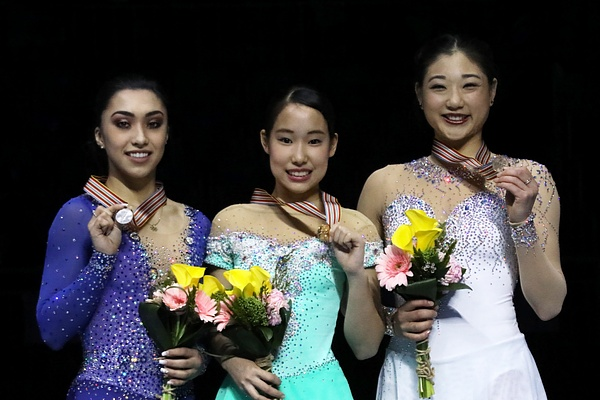
The ladies podium at the 2017 Four Continents Championships

| Rank | Name | Nation | Total points | SP | | FS | |
|---|---|---|---|---|---|---|---|
| 1 | Mai Mihara | Japan | 200.85 | 4 | 66.51 | 1 | 134.34 |
| 2 | Gabrielle Daleman | Canada | 196.91 | 1 | 68.25 | 3 | 128.66 |
| 3 | Mirai Nagasu | United States | 194.95 | 5 | 62.91 | 2 | 132.04 |
| 4 | Kaetlyn Osmond | Canada | 184.17 | 2 | 68.21 | 6 | 115.96 |
| 5 | Choi Da-bin | South Korea | 182.41 | 6 | 61.62 | 4 | 120.79 |
| 6 | Mariah Bell | United States | 177.10 | 7 | 61.21 | 7 | 115.89 |
| 7 | Li Zijun | China | 177.05 | 8 | 60.37 | 5 | 116.68 |
| 8 | Elizabet Tursynbaeva | Kazakhstan | 176.65 | 3 | 66.87 | 11 | 109.78 |
| 9 | Wakaba Higuchi | Japan | 172.05 | 10 | 58.83 | 9 | 113.22 |
| 10 | Rika Hongo | Japan | 167.42 | 9 | 59.16 | 13 | 108.26 |
| 11 | Alaine Chartrand | Canada | 167.12 | 14 | 53.64 | 8 | 113.48 |
| 12 | Karen Chen | United States | 166.82 | 12 | 55.60 | 10 | 111.22 |
| 13 | Li Xiangning | China | 164.85 | 11 | 55.73 | 12 | 109.12 |
| 14 | Brooklee Han | Australia | 152.05 | 16 | 48.44 | 14 | 103.61 |
| 15 | Zhao Ziquan | China | 147.37 | 15 | 49.97 | 15 | 97.40 |
| 16 | Kailani Craine | Australia | 136.91 | 13 | 54.70 | 17 | 82.21 |
| 17 | Amy Lin | Chinese Taipei | 125.02 | 18 | 45.40 | 19 | 79.62 |
| 18 | Maisy Ma | Hong Kong | 124.65 | 19 | 43.55 | 18 | 81.10 |
| 19 | Son Suh-hyun | South Korea | 122.35 | 22 | 38.61 | 16 | 83.74 |
| 20 | Chloe Ing | Singapore | 120.18 | 21 | 41.61 | 20 | 78.57 |
| 21 | Shuran Yu | Singapore | 118.40 | 20 | 43.26 | 21 | 75.14 |
| WD | Kim Na-hyun | South Korea | withdrew | 17 | 45.95 | withdrew from competition | |
| WD | Michaela du Toit | South Africa | withdrew | 23 | 33.39 | withdrew from competition | |

=== Pairs ===
| Rank | Name | Nation | Total points | SP | | FS | |
|---|---|---|---|---|---|---|---|
| 1 | Sui Wenjing / Han Cong | China | 225.03 | 1 | 80.75 | 1 | 144.28 |
| 2 | Meagan Duhamel / Eric Radford | Canada | 212.23 | 3 | 74.31 | 2 | 137.92 |
| 3 | Liubov Ilyushechkina / Dylan Moscovitch | Canada | 205.31 | 4 | 73.04 | 4 | 132.27 |
| 4 | Yu Xiaoyu / Zhang Hao | China | 203.40 | 2 | 75.20 | 5 | 128.20 |
| 5 | Peng Cheng / Jin Yang | China | 202.92 | 7 | 66.44 | 3 | 136.48 |
| 6 | Alexa Scimeca Knierim / Chris Knierim | United States | 193.91 | 6 | 69.10 | 6 | 124.81 |
| 7 | Kirsten Moore-Towers / Michael Marinaro | Canada | 192.35 | 5 | 70.89 | 7 | 121.46 |
| 8 | Haven Denney / Brandon Frazier | United States | 179.45 | 8 | 63.39 | 8 | 116.06 |
| 9 | Ashley Cain / Timothy LeDuc | United States | 168.87 | 9 | 62.58 | 10 | 106.27 |
| 10 | Sumire Suto / Francis Boudreau-Audet | Japan | 164.96 | 10 | 58.14 | 9 | 106.82 |
| 11 | Ekaterina Alexandrovskaya / Harley Windsor | Australia | 154.10 | 11 | 56.10 | 11 | 98.00 |
| 12 | Kim Su-yeon / Kim Hyung-tae | South Korea | 140.68 | 13 | 49.88 | 12 | 90.80 |
| 13 | Miu Suzaki / Ryuichi Kihara | Japan | 130.85 | 12 | 50.48 | 14 | 80.37 |
| 14 | Ji Min-ji / Themistocles Leftheris | South Korea | 129.19 | 14 | 45.81 | 13 | 83.38 |
| 15 | Kim Kyu-eun / Alex Kang-chan Kam | South Korea | 118.91 | 15 | 41.06 | 15 | 77.85 |

=== Ice dancing ===
| Rank | Name | Nation | Total points | SD | | FD | |
|---|---|---|---|---|---|---|---|
| 1 | Tessa Virtue / Scott Moir | Canada | 196.95 | 1 | 79.75 | 1 | 117.20 |
| 2 | Maia Shibutani / Alex Shibutani | United States | 191.85 | 2 | 76.59 | 2 | 115.26 |
| 3 | Madison Chock / Evan Bates | United States | 185.58 | 3 | 74.67 | 3 | 110.91 |
| 4 | Madison Hubbell / Zachary Donohue | United States | 180.82 | 4 | 73.79 | 6 | 107.03 |
| 5 | Kaitlyn Weaver / Andrew Poje | Canada | 180.09 | 5 | 71.15 | 4 | 108.94 |
| 6 | Piper Gilles / Paul Poirier | Canada | 170.14 | 7 | 61.21 | 5 | 108.93 |
| 7 | Wang Shiyue / Liu Xinyu | China | 154.23 | 6 | 61.45 | 7 | 92.78 |
| 8 | Yura Min / Alexander Gamelin | South Korea | 144.69 | 8 | 59.01 | 8 | 85.68 |
| 9 | Kana Muramoto / Chris Reed | Japan | 140.38 | 9 | 57.80 | 9 | 82.58 |
| 10 | Chen Hong / Zhao Yan | China | 128.55 | 11 | 51.34 | 10 | 77.21 |
| 11 | Song Linshu / Sun Zhuoming | China | 124.59 | 10 | 51.60 | 11 | 72.99 |
| 12 | Emi Hirai / Marien de la Asuncion | Japan | 121.71 | 12 | 49.35 | 12 | 72.36 |
| 13 | Lee Ho-jung / Richard Kang-in Kam | South Korea | 112.42 | 13 | 44.57 | 13 | 67.85 |
| 14 | Adele Morrison / Demid Rokachev | Australia | 96.35 | 14 | 37.87 | 14 | 58.48 |
| 15 | Matilda Friend / William Badaoui | Australia | 89.29 | 16 | 32.75 | 15 | 56.54 |
| 16 | Kimberley Hew-Low / Timothy McKernan | Australia | 84.97 | 15 | 33.54 | 16 | 51.43 |

== Medals summary ==
=== Medalists ===
Medals for overall placement:

| Discipline | Gold | Silver | Bronze |
|---|---|---|---|
| Men | (United States) Nathan Chen | (Japan) Yuzuru Hanyu | (Japan) Shoma Uno |
| Ladies | (Japan) Mai Mihara | (Canada) Gabrielle Daleman | (United States) Mirai Nagasu |
| Pairs | (China) Sui Wenjing / Han Cong | (Canada) Meagan Duhamel / Eric Radford | (Canada) Liubov Ilyushechkina / Dylan Moscovitch |
| Ice dancing | (Canada) Tessa Virtue / Scott Moir | (United States) Maia Shibutani / Alex Shibutani | (United States) Madison Chock / Evan Bates |

Small medals for placement in the short segment:

| Discipline | Gold | Silver | Bronze |
|---|---|---|---|
| Men | (United States) Nathan Chen | (Japan) Shoma Uno | (Japan) Yuzuru Hanyu |
| Ladies | (Canada) Gabrielle Daleman | (Canada) Kaetlyn Osmond | (Kazakhstan) Elizabet Tursynbaeva |
| Pairs | (China) Sui Wenjing / Han Cong | (China) Yu Xiaoyu / Zhang Hao | (Canada) Meagan Duhamel / Eric Radford |
| Ice dancing | (Canada) Tessa Virtue / Scott Moir | (United States) Maia Shibutani / Alex Shibutani | (United States) Madison Chock / Evan Bates |

Small medals for placement in the free segment:

| Discipline | Gold | Silver | Bronze |
|---|---|---|---|
| Men | (Japan) Yuzuru Hanyu | (United States) Nathan Chen | (Japan) Shoma Uno |
| Ladies | (Japan) Mai Mihara | (United States) Mirai Nagasu | (Canada) Gabrielle Daleman |
| Pairs | (China) Sui Wenjing / Han Cong | (Canada) Meagan Duhamel / Eric Radford | (China) Peng Cheng / Jin Yang |
| Ice dancing | (Canada) Tessa Virtue / Scott Moir | (United States) Maia Shibutani / Alex Shibutani | (United States) Madison Chock / Evan Bates |

=== Medals by country ===
Table of medals for overall placement:

| Rank | Nation | Gold | Silver | Bronze | Total |
|---|---|---|---|---|---|
| 1 | Canada (CAN) | 1 | 2 | 1 | 4 |
| 2 | United States (USA) | 1 | 1 | 2 | 4 |
| 3 | Japan (JPN) | 1 | 1 | 1 | 3 |
| 4 | China (CHN) | 1 | 0 | 0 | 1 |
| Totals (4 entries) | | 4 | 4 | 4 | 12 |
