= Alisson Perticheto =

Filipino figure skater (born 1997)

Alisson Krystle Perticheto
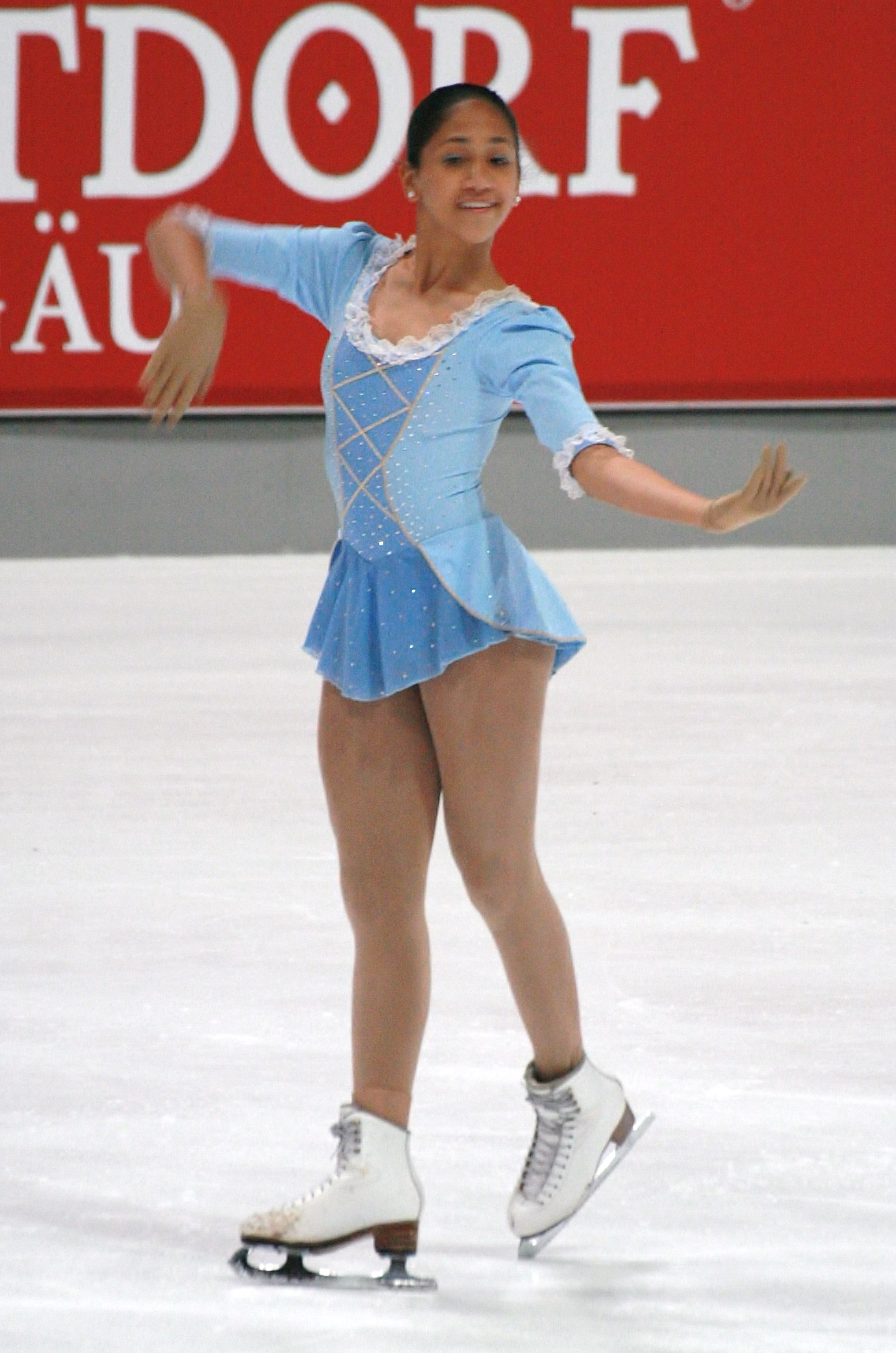
- Perticheto in 2013

Personal information
- Born: 18 September 1997 (age 28) Geneva, Switzerland
- Home town: Mies, Vaud, Switzerland
- Height: 1.60 m (5 ft 3 in)

Figure skating career
- Country: Philippines (2011–2022); Switzerland (until 2011)
- Coach: Roberto Moschella, Mario Perticheto
- Skating club: CPG Geneva
- Began skating: 2004
- Retired: 10 August 2022

Alisson Krystle Perticheto (born 18 September 1997) is a former figure skater. Born in Switzerland, she last represented the Philippines. She is the 2017 Egna Spring Trophy champion, 2015 Skate Helena silver medalist, and 2014 Philippines national champion. She has competed in the free skate at three ISU Championships, placing 18th at 2013 Junior Worlds in Milan, Italy; 17th at 2014 Four Continents in Taipei, Taiwan; and 16th at 2015 Four Continents in Seoul, South Korea.

In August 2022, Perticheto transitioned to coaching.

== Programs ==
Season	Short program	Free skating	Exhibition
2019–2020	Milonga Del Angel by Michel Ratei	Galicia Flamenca by Gino d'Auri	
2018–2019	Perhaps, Perhaps, Perhaps; Sway; performed by The Pussycat Dolls	Tangata dell'alba; Tema di Maria; Yo Soy Maria; by Astor Piazzolla	
2017–2018	Quizás, Quizás, Quizás by Osvaldo Farrés	The Umbrellas of Cherbourg by Michel Legrand; Masquerade: Waltz by Aram Khachaturian	
2016–2017	Luz de Luna; by Álvaro Carrillo: La cumparsita; by Gerardo Matos Rodríguez performed by Xavier Cugat	unknown	
2014–2015	Luz de Luna; by Álvaro Carrillo: La cumparsita; by Gerardo Matos Rodríguez performed by Xavier Cugat	Masquerade: Waltz by Aram Khachaturian	
2013–2014	Capriccio Brillant	The Sleeping Beauty by Pyotr Ilyich Tchaikovsky	
2012–2013	Il Rondo de Hummel	The Sleeping Beauty by Pyotr Ilyich Tchaikovsky	
2010–2011	Violin Concerto No. 4 by Niccolò Paganini	Le diable à quatre by Adolphe Adam	The Birds by Ottorino Respighi
2008–2009	unknown	The Tales of Beatrix Potter by John Lanchbery	Les Misérables by Claude-Michel Schönberg

== Competitive highlights ==
=== For the Philippines ===
- CS – Event of the ISU Challenger Series
- JGP – Event of the ISU Junior Grand Prix Series

Competition placements at senior level
Season	2012–13	2013–14	2014–15	2016–17	2017–18	2018–19	2019–20	2020–21	2021–22
World Championships		WD	34th		WD		C	WD	
Four Continents		17th	16th			18th	18th		
CS Cup of Tyrol								C	
CS Finlandia					17th	WD	15th		
CS Golden Spin						23rd		WD	WD
CS Lombardia					23rd	WD			
CS Nebelhorn					11th	WD	12th	WD	
CS Warsaw Cup							16th		WD
Bavarian Open				13th					
Bosphorus Cup						1st			
Coupe du Printemps				4th					
Cup of Nice		13th		20th					
Cup of Tyrol				9th					
EduSport Trophy						2nd			
Egna Trophy	5th			1st					
Nebelhorn Trophy		18th							
SEA Games					3rd		2nd		
Skate Helena			2nd						
Toruń Cup							WD		
Philippine Championships		1st			1st	1st			

Competition placements at junior level
Season	2011–12	2012–13	2013–14	2016–17
Junior Worlds		18th	WD	
JGP Slovenia		13th		
Bavarian Open		2nd		
Grand Prix of Bratislava				2nd
Philippine Championships	1st	1st		

== Detailed results ==
=== Senior level ===
- CS – Event of the ISU Challenger Series

Results in the 2019–20 season
Date	Event	SP		FS		Total	
Date	Event	P	Score	P	Score	P	Score
Sep 25–28, 2019	(Germany) 2019 CS Nebelhorn Trophy	11	48.56	14	87.37	12	135.93
Oct 11–13, 2019	(Finland) 2019 CS Finlandia Trophy	18	39.77	15	83.09	15	122.86
Nov 14–17, 2019	(Poland) 2019 CS Warsaw Cup	19	46.50	16	93.20	16	139.70
Nov 29–1 Dec 2019	(Philippines) 2019 Southeast Asian Games	1	53.65	2	79.11	2	132.76
Feb 4–9, 2020	(South Korea) 2020 Four Continents Championships	5	40.67	9	89.32	7	129.99

Results in the 2018–19 season
Date	Event	SP		FS		Total	
Date	Event	P	Score	P	Score	P	Score
Sep 12–16, 2018	(Italy) 2018 CS Lombardia Trophy	21	36.62	–	–	WD	–
Nov 28–1 Dec 2018	(Turkey) 2018 Bosphorus Cup	4	49.88	1	103.37	1	153.25
Dec 5–8, 2018	(Croatia) 2018 CS Golden Spin of Zagreb	18	45.48	25	73.92	23	119.40
Jan 9–12, 2019	(Romania) 2019 EduSport Trophy	2	51.41	5	88.52	2	139.93
Feb 4–10, 2019	(United States) 2019 Four Continents Championships	16	51.66	19	85.31	18	136.97

Results in the 2017–18 season
Date	Event	SP		FS		Total	
Date	Event	P	Score	P	Score	P	Score
Aug 26–27, 2017	(Malaysia) 2017 Southeast Asian Games	2	48.54	4	64.86	3	113.40
Sep 14–17, 2017	(Germany) 2017 CS Nebelhorn Trophy	23	43.55	24	76.57	23	120.12
Sep 27–30, 2017	(Italy) 2017 CS Lombardia Trophy	12	46.75	11	89.91	11	136.66
Oct 6–8, 2017	(Finland) 2017 CS Finlandia Trophy	17	45.57	17	83.35	17	128.92

Results in the 2016–17 season
Date	Event	SP		FS		Total	
Date	Event	P	Score	P	Score	P	Score
Oct 14–16, 2016	(France) 2016 Cup of Nice	19	43.69	22	64.95	20	108.64
Feb 14–19, 2017	(Germany) 2017 Bavarian Open	18	40.02	11	84.56	13	124.58
Feb 28–5 Mar 2017	(Austria) 2017 Cup of Tyrol	7	46.59	11	79.72	9	126.31
Mar 10–12, 2017	(Luxembourg) 2017 Coupe du Printemps	4	48.68	4	87.70	4	136.38
Apr 6–9, 2017	(Italy) 2017 Egna Spring Trophy	1	53.55	1	90.06	1	143.61

Results in the 2014–15 season
Date	Event	SP		FS		Total	
Date	Event	P	Score	P	Score	P	Score
Oct 14–16, 2015	(Serbia) 2015 Skate Helena	2	41.79	2	76.16	2	117.95
Feb 10–15, 2015	(South Korea) 2015 Four Continents Championships	17	41.63	16	74.24	16	115.87
Mar 26–3 Apr 2015	(China) 2015 World Championships	34	38.75	–	–	34	38.75
Apr 15–19, 2015	(Slovenia) 2015 Triglav Trophy	5	36.60	5	67.00	5	103.60

Results in the 2013–14 season
Date	Event	SP		FS		Total	
Date	Event	P	Score	P	Score	P	Score
Sep 25–28, 2013	(Germany) 2013 Nebelhorn Trophy	16	45.17	25	68.31	18	113.48
Oct 23–27, 2013	(France) 2013 Cup of Nice	22	41.13	11	83.11	13	124.24
Jan 20–29, 2014	(Taiwan) 2014 Four Continents Championships	16	47.81	19	67.14	17	114.95

Results in the 2012–13 season
Date	Event	SP		FS		Total	
Date	Event	P	Score	P	Score	P	Score
Apr 2–3, 2013	(Italy) 2013 Gardena Spring Trophy	5	48.75	3	88.30	5	137.05

=== Junior level ===
- JGP – Event of the ISU Junior Grand Prix Series
- A – advanced novice level
- D – debs
- N– novice level

Results in the 2016–17 season
Date	Event	SP		FS		Total	
Date	Event	P	Score	P	Score	P	Score
Dec 16–18, 2016	(Slovakia) Grand Prix of Bratislava	3	41.92	2	79.97	2	121.89

Results in the 2013–14 season
Date	Event	SP		FS		Total	
Date	Event	P	Score	P	Score	P	Score
Sep 27–29, 2012	2012 JGP Slovenia	12	43.33	15	71.55	13	114.88
Feb 6–11, 2013	(Germany) 2013 Bavarian Open	2	44.00	2	81.11	2	125.11
Feb 25–3 Mar 2013	(Italy) 2013 World Junior Championships	24	41.25	16	78.51	18	119.76

Results in the 2010–11 season
Date	Event	SP		FS		Total	
Date	Event	P	Score	P	Score	P	Score
Nov 9–14, 2010	(Austria) 2010 Ice Challenge (A)	1	36.62	2	52.16	1	88.78
Dec 9–11, 2010	(Switzerland) 2011 Swiss Senior Championships	8	33.62	4	73.58	6	107.20
Feb 9–13, 2011	(Germany) 2011 Bavarian Open (N)	1	36.55	1	53.03	1	89.58

Results in the 2009–10 season
Date	Event	SP		FS		Total	
Date	Event	P	Score	P	Score	P	Score
Dec 10–12, 2009	(Switzerland) 2010 Swiss Championships	1	42.38	2	72.38	1	114.76
Jan 28–31, 2010	(Germany) 2010 Bavarian Open (N)	2	34.50	1	56.15	1	90.65

Results in the 2008–09 season
Date	Event	SP		FS		Total	
Date	Event	P	Score	P	Score	P	Score
Mar 4–8, 2009	(Netherlands) 2009 Challenge Cup (D)	3	30.86	2	61.59	2	92.45
