= Kailani Craine =

Australian figure skater

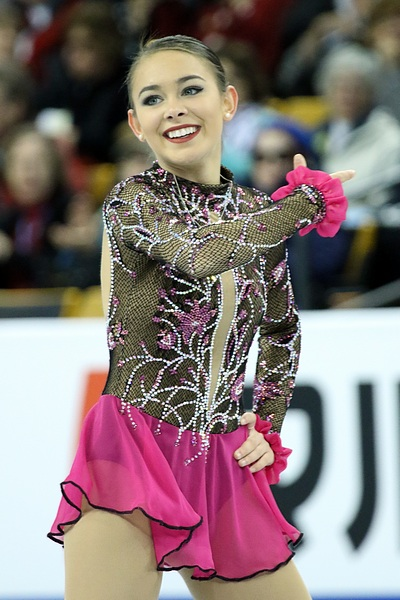
- Craine at the 2016 World Championships

Personal information
- Born: 13 August 1998 (age 28) Newcastle, New South Wales, Australia
- Home town: Newcastle, New South Wales
- Height: 1.60 m (5 ft 3 in)

Figure skating career
- Country: Australia
- Coach: Tiffany Chin
- Skating club: Hunter ISC
- Began skating: 2007
- Retired: 30 November 2022

Kailani Craine (born 13 August 1998) is a former Australian figure skater. She is the 2017 CS Nebelhorn Trophy champion, the 2016 CS Warsaw Cup silver medalist, the 2015 Toruń Cup silver medalist, and a six-time Australian national champion (2014–2019). She represented Australia at the 2018 and 2022 Winter Olympics, finishing 17th and 29th, respectively.

== Personal life ==
Kailani Craine was born on 13 August 1998 in Newcastle, New South Wales, Australia. She is the daughter and only child of Katrina and Stephen Craine. She graduated from St Francis Xavier's College, Hamilton in 2016.

== Career ==
=== Early career ===
Craine started skating at the age of eight. Tiffany Chin became her coach in 2010. Craine won gold at the 2010-11 Australian Championships at the novice level. She placed fourth at the 2011-12 Australian Championships at the junior level.

=== 2012-2013 season ===
Craine competed at the 2012 Cup of Nice placing twenty-third in the junior women level. She competed in 2012 Ice Challenge finishing seventeenth. In December, Craine competed at the 2012–13 Australian Championships and won her first junior national title.

=== 2013–2014 season ===
Craine debuted on the ISU Junior Grand Prix series at the 2013 JGP Kosice. She placed twenty-fifth in the short program and eighteenth in the free skate, finishing twenty-first overall. In December, Craine won her second junior national title at the 2013–14 Australian Championships. In March 2014, she made her first ISU Championship appearance at the 2014 World Junior Championships in Sofia, Bulgaria; she did not advance to the free skate after placing 35th in the short program.

=== 2014–2015 season ===
In December 2014, Craine won her third junior and first senior national title at the 2014-15 Australian Championships.Ranked second in the short program and first in the free skate, she outscored the defending senior champion, Brooklee Han, by 2.18 points overall.Making her senior international debut, she took the silver medal at the Toruń Cup in January 2015. Craine placed twelfth at the 2015 Four Continents Championships in Seoul, South Korea, and sixteenth at the 2015 World Junior Championships in Tallinn, Estonia.

Craine performing at the 2016 Four Continents Championships

=== 2015–2016 season ===
In December 2015, Craine repeated as Australia's junior and senior national champion. She placed ninth in the free skate and thirteenth overall at the 2016 Four Continents Championships. At the 2016 World Championships, she did not qualify to the free skate.

=== 2016–2017 season ===
After taking bronze at the Volvo Open Cup, Craine stepped on her first ISU Challenger Series podium. She received the silver medal at the 2016 CS Warsaw Cup, finishing 2.54 points behind Germany's Nicole Schott. In December, she outscored Brooklee Han by 6.94 points to win her third senior national title.

In December 2016, Craine was named to Australia's team for the 2017 Asian Winter Games in Sapporo, Japan. She placed fifth at the Asian Games and sixteenth at the 2017 Four Continents Championships. In March, she qualified to the free skate at the 2017 World Championships and went on to finish twenty-fourth overall.

Craine performing her free program at the 2018 Winter Olympics

=== 2017–2018 season: Pyeongchang Olympics ===
Craine won bronze at the Asian Open Figure Skating Trophy in August 2017 and silver at the Slovenia Open the following month. Later in September, she competed at the 2017 CS Nebelhorn Trophy, the final qualifying opportunity for the 2018 Winter Olympics; she won the gold medal and earned a spot for Australia in the ladies singles event at the Olympics. Shortly afterwards, Craine was invited to the 2017 Skate Canada International, her debut on the Grand Prix.

After winning another Australian national title, Craine competed at the 2018 Four Continents Championships, placing sixteenth. She placed seventeenth at the 2018 Winter Olympics, and also at the 2018 World Championships.

=== 2018–2019 season ===
Craine began her season at the Autumn Classic International, where she finished fourth and won the silver medal at the Warsaw Cup. She competed on the Grand Prix at the 2018 NHK Trophy, where she placed twelfth. After winning a fifth consecutive Australian national title, she placed fifteenth at the 2019 Four Continents Championships and thirty-sixth at the 2019 World Championships.

Craine competing at the 2019 Cup of China

=== 2019–2020 season ===
On the Challenger series, Craine placed fifth at the 2019 CS Autumn Classic International and fourth at the 2019 CS Asian Open. Initially without assignment on the Grand Prix, Craine was first assigned to the Cup of China to replace a withdrawn Mai Mihara. She placed twelfth at the 2020 Four Continents Championships.

Craine was assigned to compete at the World Championships in Montreal, but these were cancelled as a result of the coronavirus pandemic.

=== 2020–2021 season ===
In her only event of the season, Craine competed at the 2021 World Championships, placing twenty-sixth.

=== 2021–2022 season ===
Following not making the free skate at the World Championships, Craine sought a second opportunity to qualify a berth for Australia at the 2022 Winter Olympics by competing at the 2021 CS Nebelhorn Trophy. She placed fourth in the short program and tenth in the free skate, for seventh place overall and the sixth of six available places. Competing next at the 2021 CS Finlandia Trophy, Craine placed sixteenth before concluding the fall season by finishing eighth at the 2021 CS Golden Spin of Zagreb.

With the Australian championships cancelled for a second year, Craine was assigned to the 2022 Four Continents Championships in Tallinn to compete for her country's Olympic spot against domestic rival Victoria Alcantara. Craine finished twelfth at the event, five ordinals and twenty-five points ahead of Alcantara. Days later, she was named to the Australian Olympic team. Craine called this "the end goal" of the preceding four years, which she was proud to have achieved. She was twenty-eighth in the short program of the Olympic women's event after she doubled her triple lutz, and did not advance to the free skate. She went on to finish the season with a twenty-second-place finish at the 2022 World Championships.

She announced her retirement from competitive skating on 30 November 2022.

== Programs ==
Season	Short program	Free skating	Exhibition
2021–2022	Heart of Glass by Philip Glass and Blondie	Gangsta's Paradise	
2020–2021	Heart of Glass by Philip Glass and Blondie	Shout by Tears for Fears performed by Think Up Anger feat. Malia J; Lux Aeterna (from Requiem for a Dream) by Clint Mansell	
2019–2020	I Like It Like That by Pete Rodriguez choreo. by Alex Chang	Shout by Tears for Fears performed by Think Up Anger feat. Malia J; Lux Aeterna (from Requiem for a Dream) by Clint Mansell	
2018–2019	Adagio in G Minor by Tomaso Albinoni	Bei Mir Bistu Shein by Sholom Secunda performed Janis Siegel; Sing, Sing, Sing by Louis Prima	
2017–2018	Dream a Little Dream performed by Ella Fitzgerald; One Day (Swingrowers Remix) performed by Caro Emerald	Closing Credits: Bolero; Hindi Sad Diamonds (from Moulin Rouge!)	Circus performed by Britney Spears
2016–2017	Dream a Little Dream performed by Ella Fitzgerald; One Day (Swingrowers Remix) performed by Caro Emerald	Hallelujah	
2015–2016	Flamenco Fire by Didulia choreo. by Alex Chang	Romeo + Juliet; Kissing You by Des'ree; O Verona by Craig Armstrong choreo. by Alex Chang	
2014–2015	Broken Sorrow by Nuttin' But Stringz	Primavera by Ludovico Einaudi	Diamonds by Rihanna
2013–2014	Broken Sorrow by Nuttin' But Stringz	Bolero by Steve Charles	
2012–2013	Spanish Caravan by The Doors	Bolero (from Moulin Rouge!) by Craig Armstrong (composer)	
2010–2011	unknown	Tosca by Giacomo Puccini	

== Competitive highlights ==
GP: Grand Prix; CS: Challenger Series; JGP: Junior Grand Prix

International
Event	11–12	12–13	13–14	14–15	15–16	16–17	17–18	18–19	19–20	20–21	21–22
Olympics							17th				28th
Worlds					27th	24th	17th	36th	C	26th	22nd
Four Continents				12th	13th	16th	16th	15th	12th		12th
GP Cup of China									10th		
GP NHK Trophy								12th	10th		
GP Skate Canada							10th				
CS Asian Open									4th		
CS Autumn Classic								4th	5th		
CS Denis Ten											WD
CS Finlandia Trophy											16th
CS Golden Spin											8th
CS Ice Challenge					7th						
CS Nebelhorn					8th		1st				7th
CS Ondrej Nepela							8th				
CS Warsaw Cup						2nd			WD		
Asian Games						5th					
Asian Open							3rd				
Cranberry Cup											12th
Shanghai Trophy							5th				
Slovenia Open							2nd				
Toruń Cup				2nd							
Volvo Open Cup						3rd					
Warsaw Cup								2nd			
International: Junior
Junior Worlds			35th	16th							
JGP Estonia				12th							
JGP Slovakia			21st								
JGP Spain					8th						
JGP U.S.					12th						
Cup of Nice		23rd									
Ice Challenge		17th									
Lombardia Trophy			2nd	1st							
Skate Down Under			1st								
National
Australian Champ.				1st	1st	1st	1st	1st	1st	C	C
Australian Junior Champ.	4th J	1st J	1st J	1st J	1st J						
