= Yu Shuran =

Singaporean figure skater

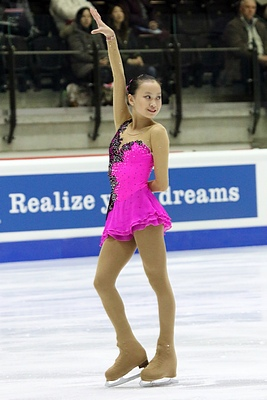
- Yu at the 2015 World Junior Championships

Personal information
- Native name: 于书然
- Other names: Jessica Shuran Yu
- Born: August 4, 2000 (age 26) Beijing, China
- Height: 1.53 m (5 ft 0 in)

Figure skating career
- Country: Singapore
- Coach: Gao Song
- Skating club: Champion Ice SC, Singapore
- Began skating: 2006
- Retired: June 2018
Medal record
Representing Singapore
Southeast Asian Games
Gold medal – first place	2017 Kuala Lumpur	Ladies's singles

Yu Shuran, also known as Jessica Shuran Yu, (于书然, born August 4, 2000) is a Chinese-born former competitive figure skater who represented Singapore internationally. Competing in ladies' singles, she became the 2017 Southeast Asian Games champion and a two-time national champion. She skated in the final segment at two ISU Championships.

== Personal life ==
Yu was born on August 4, 2000, in Beijing, China. Her mother and father were born in China, with her father obtaining Singaporean citizenship subsequently. As of 2020, Yu is enrolled at Fordham University in New York City.

== Skating career ==
=== 2014–2015 season ===
Gao Song coached Yu in Beijing, China, since at least the 2014–2015 season. Making her junior international debut, Yu placed 8th at the Asian Open Trophy in August 2014. In October of the same year, she appeared at her first ISU Junior Grand Prix (JGP) event, placing 9th in Zagreb, Croatia. In March 2015, she qualified for the free skate at her first ISU Championship – the 2015 World Junior Championships in Tallinn, Estonia and finished 24th overall.

=== 2015–2016 season ===
Yu remained on the junior level during the 2015–2016 season. She placed 28th and was eliminated after the short program at the 2016 World Junior Championships, held in March in Debrecen, Hungary.

=== 2016–2017 season ===
Yu's senior international debut came in August 2016 at the Asian Open Trophy in Manila, Philippines. After placing 5th at the event, Yu competed at a JGP event in Germany and then returned to the senior level. In February 2017, she placed 21st at the Four Continents Championships in Gangneung, South Korea, and 6th at the Asian Winter Games in Sapporo, Japan. In Japan, she obtained the minimum technical scores to compete at the 2017 World Championships in Helsinki, Finland, making her the first figure skater to represent Singapore at the World Championships.

=== 2017–2018 season ===
Yu began her season by becoming the first female figure skater to win a gold medal at the Southeast Asian Games. She placed first in the short program and second in the free skate.

In September 2017, Yu competed in Oberstdorf, Germany, at the 2017 CS Nebelhorn Trophy, the final qualifying opportunity for the 2018 Winter Olympics. Her placement, 9th out of 35 skaters, was not high enough to qualify but Singapore became the second alternate for an Olympic spot.

Around January 2018, Yu was hospitalized and diagnosed with a neurological disorder. As a result, she missed the rest of the season, including the 2018 Singapore National Championships and the 2018 Four Continents Championships. Although her health improved with treatment, she learned that she would not be able to return to competition. In June 2018, she officially announced her retirement from competitive skating.

=== Training abuse in China ===
In July 2020, Yu stated that she was abused from the age of 11 while training in China. She said that her coach would often hit her with a plastic skate guard, sometimes more than ten times in a row, and when she was 14, he kicked her in the shin with a toe pick (jagged teeth on the front of a skate blade). She also described what she witnessed while working as a coach in Beijing: "I saw one junior skater get hit and dragged off the ice, while another was pressured into competing on two torn ligaments, which left them needing surgery afterwards."

== Programs ==
Season	Short program	Free skating
2016–2018	Blues Instrumental by Jethro Tull; Maria Maria by Wyclef Jean	The Great Gatsby; Young and Beautiful by Lana Del Rey; A Little Party Never Killed Nobody by Fergie, GoonRock, and Q-Tip
2015–2016	Réveil (from Cirque du Soleil's Quidam) by Benoît Jutras	The Great Gatsby; Young and Beautiful by Lana Del Rey; A Little Party Never Killed Nobody by Fergie, GoonRock, and Q-Tip
2014–2015	Fancy Free	Coppélia by Léo Delibes

== Competitive highlights ==
GP: Grand Prix; CS: Challenger Series; JGP: Junior Grand Prix

International
Event	14–15	15–16	16–17	17–18
World Champ.			25th	
Four Continents Champ.			21st	
CS Nebelhorn Trophy				9th
Asian Games			6th	
Asian Trophy			5th	
SEA Games				1st
International: Junior
World Junior Champ.	24th	28th		
JGP Croatia	9th			
JGP Germany			15th	
JGP Slovakia		15th		
JGP Spain		15th		
Asian Trophy	8th J			
National
Singapore Champ.	1st		1st	
J = Junior level
