= Figure skating at the 2019 SEA Games =

- Figure skating pictogram
- Venue: SM Skating Megamall
- Location: Mandaluyong, Metro Manila, Philippines
- Dates: 29 November – 1 December
- Competitors: 16 from 5 nations

Medalists
gold medal	Julian Zhi Jie Yee (MAS); Chloe Ing (SGP)
silver medal	Christopher Caluza (PHI); Alisson Krystle Perticheto (PHI)
bronze medal	Micah Kai Lynette (THA); Savika Refa Zahira (INA)

The figure skating competition at the 2019 Southeast Asian Games in the Philippines was held from 29 November to 1 December 2019 at the SM Skating Megamall ice skating rink in Mandaluyong.

== Competition schedule ==
The following is the schedule for the figure skating competitions. All times are Philippine Standard Time (UTC+8).

Date	Time	Event	Phase
29 November	16:15	Ladies' singles	Short program
29 November	17:40	Men's singles	Short program
1 December	16:15	Ladies' singles	Free skating
1 December	18:05	Men's singles	Free skating

== Results ==
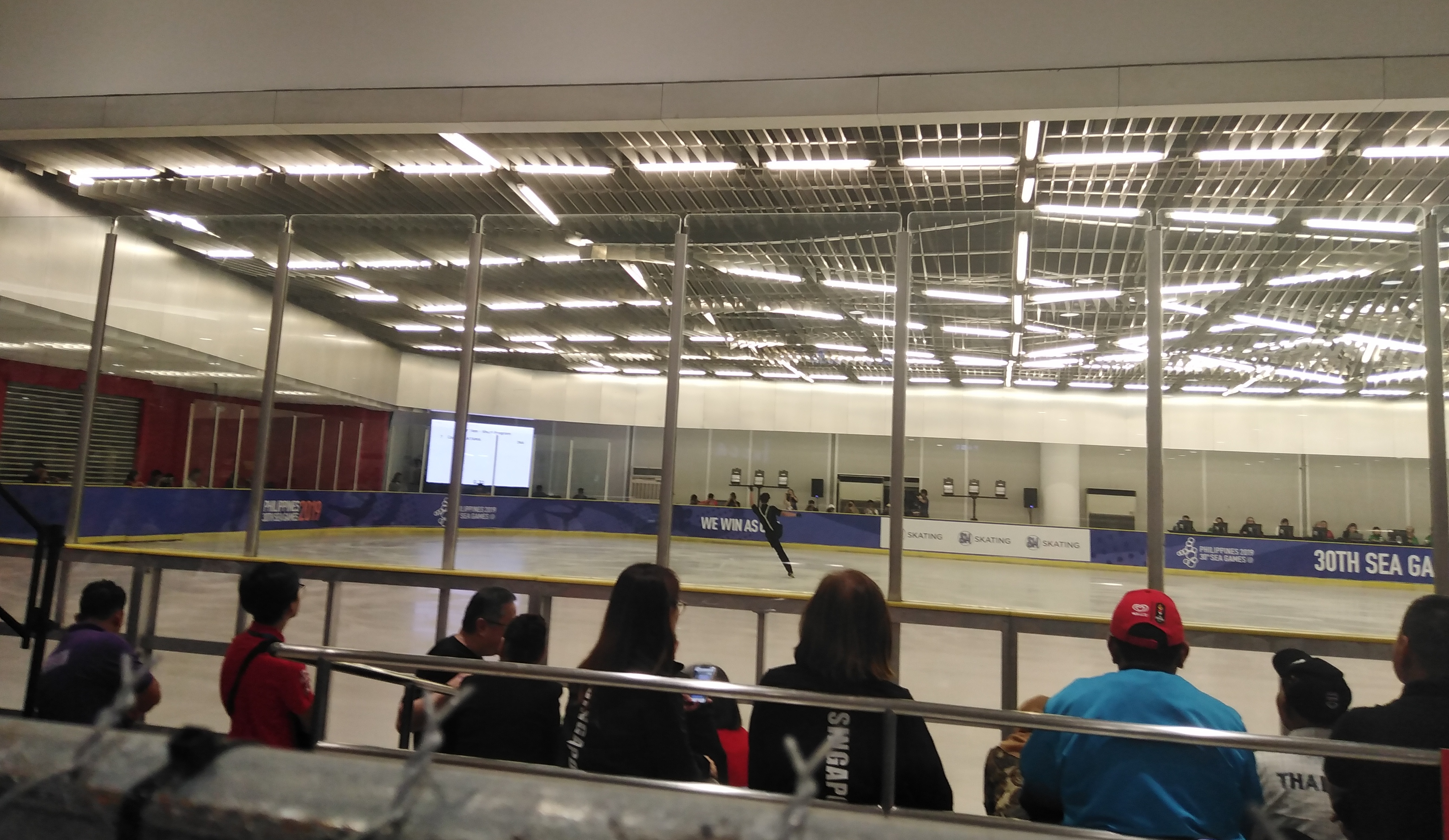
SM Skating Megamall during the men's single short program.

=== Men's singles ===
Rank	Name	Nation	Total points	SP		FS	
1	Julian Zhi Jie Yee	Malaysia	202.62	1	63.35	1	139.27
2	Christopher Caluza	Philippines	180.22	2	62.37	2	117.85
3	Micah Kai Lynette	Thailand	174.06	4	60.77	3	113.29
4	Edrian Paul Celestino	Philippines	169.59	3	61.52	4	108.07
5	Pagiel Yie Ken Sng	Singapore	135.17	5	52.06	5	83.11
6	Muhammad Dwi Apolianto	Indonesia	115.48	6	38.78	6	76.70
7	Calvin Pratama	Indonesia	86.23	7	31.04	7	55.19

=== Ladies' singles ===
Rank	Name	Nation	Total points	SP		FS	
1	Chloe Ing	Singapore	152.67	2	50.67	1	102.00
2	Alisson Krystle Perticheto	Philippines	132.76	1	53.65	2	79.11
3	Savika Refa Zahira	Indonesia	100.80	3	32.62	3	68.18
4	Thita Lamsam	Thailand	89.38	4	27.30	5	62.08
5	Tasya Putri	Indonesia	88.84	5	26.34	4	62.50
6	Aina Sorfina Mohd Aminudin	Malaysia	85.24	7	25.66	6	59.58
7	Teekhree Silpa-archa	Thailand	78.61	6	26.18	7	52.43
8	Chew Sze Chyi	Malaysia	71.76	8	22.78	9	48.98
9	Cirinia Renee Gillett	Philippines	71.23	9	20.93	8	50.30

== Medal summary ==
=== Medal table ===
Key

Host nation

Rank	Nation	Gold	Silver	Bronze	Total
1	Malaysia	1	0	0	1
1	Singapore	1	0	0	1
3	Philippines*	0	2	0	2
4	Indonesia	0	0	1	1
4	Thailand	0	0	1	1
Totals (5 entries)		2	2	2	6

=== Medalists ===
Event	Gold	Silver	Bronze
Men's singles	Julian Yee Zhi-Jie; Malaysia	Christopher Caluza; Philippines	Micah Kai Lynette; Thailand
Ladies' singles	Chloe Ing; Singapore	Alisson Krystle Perticheto; Philippines	Savika Refa Zahira; Indonesia
