= Micah Kai Lynette =

Thai-American figure skater (born 2001)

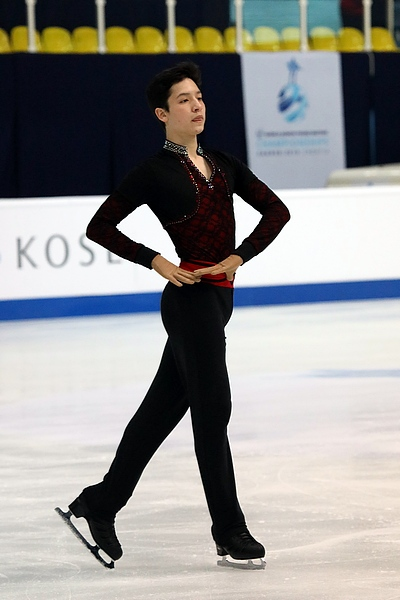
- Lynette at the 2019 World Junior Championships

Personal information
- Born: March 17, 2001 (age 25) Honolulu, Hawaii, U.S.
- Home town: Bellingham, Washington, U.S.
- Height: 5 ft 7 in (1.70 m)

Figure skating career
- Country: Thailand
- Coach: Keegan Murphy, Leah Warwick, Eileen Murphy
- Skating club: Connaught SC Richmond
- Began skating: 2008

Micah Kai Lynette (born March 17, 2001) is a Thai-American figure skater. He is the 2019 Southeast Asian Games bronze medalist and has competed in the final segment at three ISU Championships – 2018 Junior Worlds, 2019 Four Continents, and 2020 Four Continents.

== Personal life ==
Lynette was born March 17, 2001, in Honolulu, Hawaii. He is the son of Fai, originally from Thailand, and Ethan Lynette, and has two siblings – twin brother Shane and younger sister Sasha. In 2019, he graduated from Sehome High School in Bellingham, Washington.

== Career ==
=== Early years ===
Lynette started skating as a seven-year-old, in 2008. As a child, he skated at Bellingham Sportsplex in Bellingham, Washington. Around 2012, he began training at the Connaught Skating Club in Richmond, British Columbia, travelling across the border as often as five days a week.

=== 2017–18 season ===
In August 2017, making his senior international debut, Lynette placed 12th at the Asian Open Trophy in Hong Kong and fourth at the 2017 Southeast Asian Games in Malaysia. The following month, he appeared at his first ISU Junior Grand Prix (JGP) event.

In January, he competed at the 2018 Four Continents Championships in Taipei, Taiwan. Ranked 25th in the short program, he just missed the cutoff for the free skate. He was more successful in March at the 2018 World Junior Championships in Sofia, Bulgaria, where he qualified to the final segment and finished 23rd overall.

=== 2018–19 season ===
Lynette reached the final at the 2019 Four Continents Championships, which took place in February in Anaheim, California. He ranked 19th in the short, 16th in the free, and 19th overall. In March, he competed at the 2019 World Junior Championships in Zagreb, Croatia, but did not advance to the final after placing 28th in the short.

=== 2019–20 season ===
In December, Lynette won the bronze medal at the 2019 Southeast Asian Games in Mandaluyong, Philippines. He ranked 23rd in the short, 20th in the free, and 21st overall at the 2020 Four Continents Championships in February in Seoul, South Korea.

== Programs ==
| Season | Short program | Free skating |
|---|---|---|
| 2019–2020 | Ameksa: The Shepard by Taalbi Brothers; Poeta En El Viento by Vicente Amigo | Piano Concerto in F: Allegro by George Gershwin |
| 2018–2019 | Ameksa: The Shepard by Taalbi Brothers; Poeta En El Viento by Vicente Amigo | Nocturnal Animals by Abel Korzeniowski |
| 2017–2018 | Turning Page (from Breaking Dawn – Part 1) by Ryan O'Neal | Nocturnal Animals by Abel Korzeniowski |

== Competitive highlights ==
CS: Challenger Series; JGP: Junior Grand Prix

International
| Event | 16–17 | 17–18 | 18–19 | 19–20 |
|---|---|---|---|---|
| Four Continents | | 25th | 19th | 21st |
| CS Inge Solar | | | 11th | |
| CS Tallinn Trophy | | 18th | | |
| CS U.S. Classic | | | | 7th |
| SEA Games | | 4th | | 3rd |
| Asian Open | | 12th | | |
International: Junior
| Junior Worlds | | 23rd | 28th | WD |
| JGP Canada | | | 11th | |
| JGP Croatia | | 15th | | |
| JGP France | | | | 11th |
National
| Thailand | 1st | 1st | 1st | |
WD = Withdrew
