= Chloe Ing =

Singaporean-Canadian figure skater

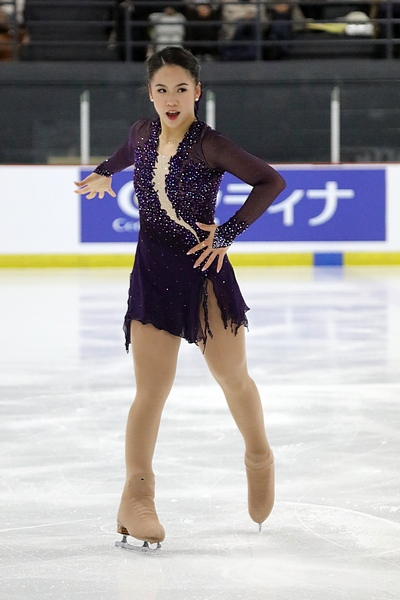
- Ing at the 2017 CS Autumn Classic International

Personal information
- Born: September 12, 1998 (age 27) Singapore
- Height: 158 cm (5 ft 2 in)

Figure skating career
- Country: Singapore
- Coach: Michelle Leigh, Doug Leigh
- Skating club: Ice Angels Singapore
- Began skating: 2006
Medal record
Representing Singapore
Southeast Asian Games
Gold medal – first place	2019 Philippines	Ladies's singles
Silver medal – second place	2017 Kuala Lumpur	Ladies's singles
Merano Cup
Bronze medal – third place	2017 Merano	Ladies's singles
Sofia Trophy
Bronze medal – third place	2018 Sofia Trophy	Ladies's singles
ISU World Development Trophy (figure skating)
Gold medal – first place	2014 Manila	Junior ladies's singles
Bronze medal – third place	2015 Kuala Lumpur	Junior ladies's singles

Chloe Ing (Chinese: 伍宣菱, born 12 September 1998) is a Singaporean former figure skater. She is the 2019 Southeast Asian Games champion, 2017 Southeast Asian Games silver medalist and a four-time senior national champion. She has competed in the final segment at three ISU Championships – the 2017 Four Continents, 2018 Four Continents, and 2018 Junior Worlds. At the 2017 Merano Cup, she became the first skater representing Singapore to win a senior ladies medal in an ISU-recognized international competition. She won her second international medal at the 2018 Sofia Trophy.

== Skating career ==
=== Early years ===
Ing grew an interest in skating after watching the 2002 Winter Olympics. She began learning to skate while traveling abroad to visit relatives, and during a trip to Canada, she and her sister took lessons from a coach who told their parents they had potential. In 2006, when Ing was 7, the family moved to Toronto to allow them to receive coaching.

She made her ISU Junior Grand Prix (JGP) debut in 2013 and would also compete on the JGP series during the following four seasons.

In 2014, Ing won the National Figure Skating Championships in the Senior Ladies' Free Skate category, representing the Ice Angels Club. In 2016, she won the National Figure Skating Championships again and was also awarded the Ice Angels Artistic Trophy, for the most artistic presentation of a routine.

She placed 20th at the 2017 Four Continents Championships in Gangneung, South Korea, and 34th at the 2017 World Junior Championships in Taipei, Taiwan.

=== 2017–2018 season ===
Ing began her season by winning the silver medal at the 2017 Southeast Asian Games. She obtained the highest free skate score to finish second overall. She then took bronze at the 2017 Merano Cup, making her the first figure skater to win a senior ladies' medal for Singapore at an ISU international competition.

Ing received the gold medal at the 2018 Singapore National Figure Skating Championships. At the 2018 Four Continents Championships, she placed 19th in the short program and 20th in the free skate to finish 19th overall. She then competed at the 2018 World Junior Figure Skating Championships, placing 20th in the short to qualify for the free skate, finishing 23rd overall.

=== 2018–2019 season ===
Outside of the Singapore Championships, which she won, Ing did not compete this season.

=== 2019–2020 season ===
Ing competed at the 2019 SEA Games, where she won the gold medal in women's singles. Ing said later that in her free skate, she was able to let go of the pressure of trying to win and focus on her performance.

Due to COVID-19 pandemic, Ing was forced to stop training in March, as rinks were closed. She decided to focus on academics while she was unable to train.

== Personal life ==
Ing was born on September 12, 1998, in Singapore, together with her twin sister, Chantelle. Her sister was also a skater, but she was forced to stop training in 2011 due to developing tendonitis in her foot.

She studied health sciences at the University of Toronto. Ing was inspired to study the subject by having seen athletes like her sister who had their careers interrupted by health issues, which she wanted to help them recover from. To cover her training fees, she worked as both a tutor and a skating coach. She graduated in 2024 and applied to law school in both Canada and Singapore; she enrolled at the National University of Singapore Faculty of Law.

== Programs ==
Season	Short program	Free skating	Ref
2013–2014	Danse Macabre by Camille Saint-Saens	Yellow River Piano Concerto	
2014–2016	Por Una Cabeza	Merry Go Round by Joe Hisaishi	
2016–2017	Can't Help Falling in Love by H. Peretti, L. Creatore, G.D. Weiss	Nocturne in E Major Op. 9 No. 2 (Fantaisie-Impromptu) by Frédéric Chopin	
2017–2018	Can't Help Falling in Love by H. Peretti, L. Creatore, G.D. Weiss	Ave Maria (medley) by Franz Schubert Nocturne in E Major Op. 9 No. 2 (Fantasie Impromptu) by Frédéric Chopin	
2018-2020	Perfect by Ed Sheeran, Emma Heesters, Kurt Hugo Schneider	Ave Maria (medley) by Franz Schubert	

== Results ==
CS: Challenger Series; JGP: Junior Grand Prix

International
Event	13–14	14–15	15–16	16–17	17–18	18–19	19–20
Four Continents				20th	19th		WD
CS Autumn Classic		8th		10th	10th		11th
CS Tallinn Trophy					14th		
CS Warsaw Cup				15th			
Asian Games				11th			
FBMA Trophy				5th			
Jégvirág Cup							4th
Merano Cup					3rd		
Philadelphia SI					11th		
SEA Games					2nd		1st
Sofia Trophy					3rd		
International: Junior
Junior Worlds				34th	23rd		
JGP Japan		17th		14th			
JGP Mexico	11th						
JGP Poland					14th		
JGP U.S.			16th				
Autumn Classic			5th				
Dragon Trophy	8th						
Philadelphia SI			6th				
National
Singapore	1st	2nd	1st	2nd	1st	1st	
J = Junior level
