= Figure skating at the 2025 SEA Games =

- Venue: Imperial World Samrung Mall
- Location: Samut Prakan, Thailand
- Dates: 12–13 December 2025
- Competitors: 17 from 5 nations

Figure skating competitions at the 2025 SEA Games took place at Imperial World Samrung Mall in Samut Prakan, Thailand from 12 to 13 December 2025. Medals were awarded in 2 events, consist of men's and women's tournament.

== Participating nations ==
- Indonesia (3)
- Malaysia (4)
- Philippines (4)
- Thailand (4) (host)
- Vietnam (2)

== Medal table ==
* Host nation (Thailand)

| Rank | Nation | Gold | Silver | Bronze | Total |
|---|---|---|---|---|---|
| 1 | Thailand* | 1 | 1 | 1 | 3 |
| 2 | Malaysia | 1 | 0 | 0 | 1 |
| 3 | Philippines | 0 | 1 | 1 | 2 |
| Totals (3 entries) | | 2 | 2 | 2 | 6 |

== Medalists ==
| Event | Gold | Silver | Bronze |
|---|---|---|---|
| Men's singles | Fang Ze Zeng; Malaysia | Aaron Kulvatunyou; Thailand | Paolo Borromeo; Philippines |
| Women's single | Phattaratida Kaneshige; Thailand | Maxine Marie Bautista; Philippines | Pimmpida Lerdpraiwan; Thailand |

== Results ==
=== Men's singles ===
| Rank | Name | Nation | Total points | SP | | FS | |
|---|---|---|---|---|---|---|---|
| 1st place, gold medalist(s) | Fang Ze Zeng | Malaysia | 213.95 | 1 | 56.73 | 1 | 157.22 |
| 2nd place, silver medalist(s) | Aaron Kulvatunyou | Thailand | 190 | 2 | 52.02 | 2 | 137.98 |
| 3rd place, bronze medalist(s) | Paolo Borromeo | Philippines | 178.67 | 3 | 50.28 | 3 | 128.39 |
| 4 | Brandon James Baldoz | Philippines | 176.59 | 4 | 48.69 | 4 | 127.90 |
| 5 | Tharon Warasittichai | Thailand | 165.05 | 5 | 45.09 | 5 | 119.96 |
| 6 | Rafif Herfianto Putra | Indonesia | 150.85 | 6 | 36.83 | 6 | 114.02 |
| 7 | Low Chun Hong | Malaysia | 118.43 | 7 | 27.31 | 7 | 91.12 |
| 8 | Nguyễn Hữu Hoàng | Vietnam | 73.05 | 8 | 19.29 | 8 | 53.76 |

=== Women's singles ===
| Rank | Name | Nation | Total points | SP | | FS | |
|---|---|---|---|---|---|---|---|
| 1st place, gold medalist(s) | Phattaratida Kaneshige | Thailand | 200.92 | 1 | 50.18 | 1 | 150.74 |
| 2nd place, silver medalist(s) | Maxine Marie Bautista | Philippines | 176.99 | 3 | 47.66 | 2 | 129.33 |
| 3rd place, bronze medalist(s) | Pimmpida Lerdpraiwan | Thailand | 164.41 | 4 | 42.30 | 3 | 122.11 |
| 4 | Cathryn Limketkai | Philippines | 163.96 | 2 | 47.66 | 5 | 116.30 |
| 5 | Audrey En Yu Lee | Malaysia | 156.69 | 5 | 39.72 | 4 | 116.97 |
| 6 | Chilly Ann Sintana Wongso | Indonesia | 138.91 | 6 | 36.17 | 6 | 102.74 |
| 7 | Safia Nurdeta Aulia Andiko | Indonesia | 128.89 | 7 | 35.96 | 7 | 92.93 |
| 8 | Afrina Diyanah Mohammad Oryza Ananda | Malaysia | 115.33 | 9 | 26.62 | 8 | 88.71 |
| 9 | Nguyễn Cao Hà My | Vietnam | 104.25 | 8 | 29.94 | 9 | 74.31 |
