= Savika Refa Zahira =

Indonesian figure skater

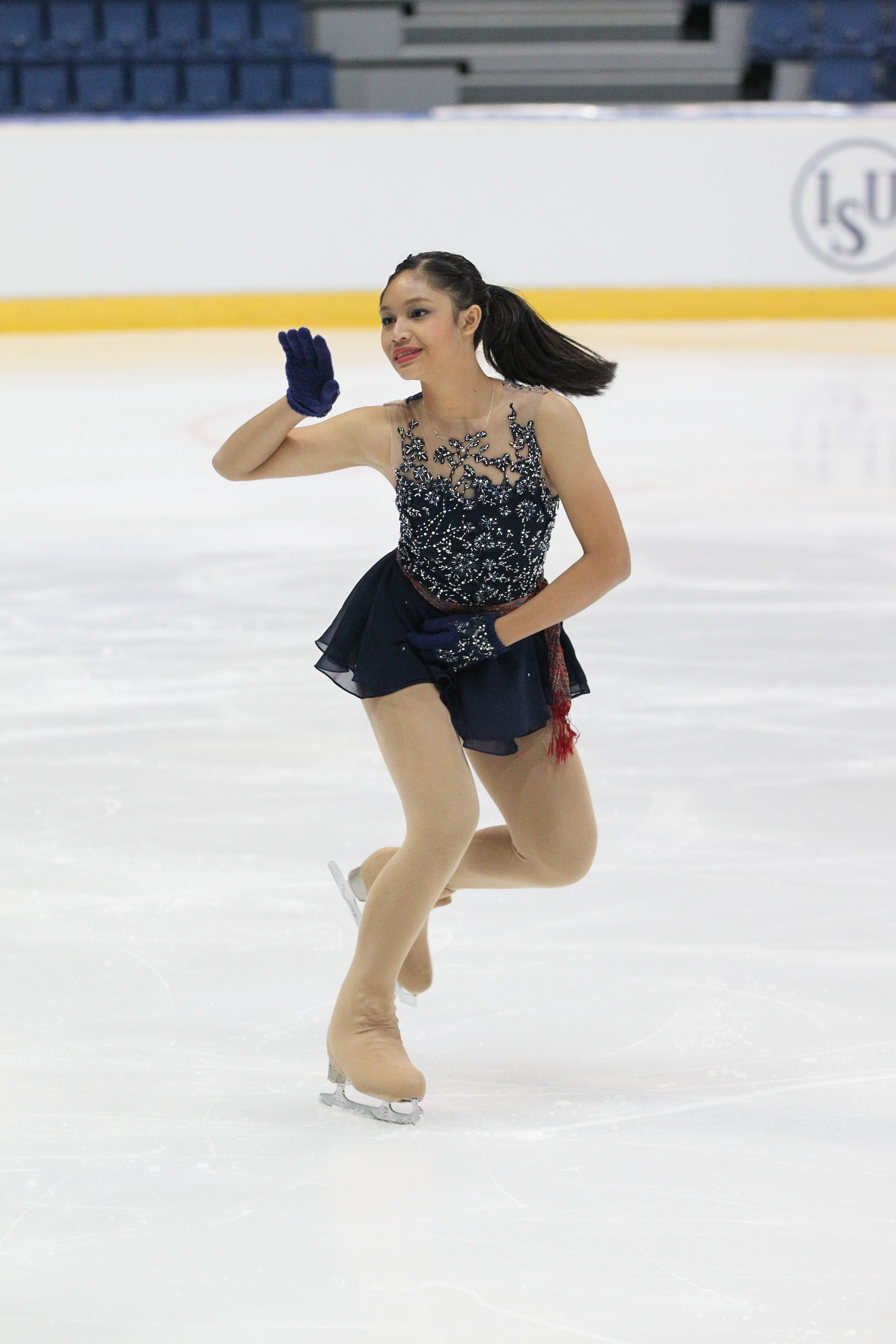

Personal information
- Born: 4 April 2004 (age 22) Jakarta, Indonesia
- Home town: Jakarta
- Height: 1.58 m (5 ft 2 in)

Figure skating career
- Coach: A.J Gunawi, B.A Nugroho, L. Aranton
- Skating club: BX Rink Tangerang Selatan
- Began skating: 2012
Medal record
Ladie's Figure skating
Representing Indonesia
Event	1st	2nd	3rd
Southeast Asian Games	0	0	1
Total	0	0	1
Ladies' Figure skating
Representing Indonesia
Bronze medal – third place	2019 Philippines	Ladies' singles

Savika Refa Zahira (born in Jakarta, 4 April 2004) is an Indonesian figure skater. She competed at the 2019 Southeast Asian Games in Manila, Philippines.

== Results ==
CS: Challenger Series; JGP: Junior Grand Prix

Event	16–17	17–18	18–19	19–20	20–21	21–22	22–23
International
Southeast Asian Games				3rd			
International: Junior
JGP Croatia	27th						
JGP Slovakia		31st					
JGP U.S.			25th				
Asian Open	12th	11th					
National: Junior
Indonesia National Figure Skating Championships							1st
