= Chew Kai Xiang =

Malaysian figure skater

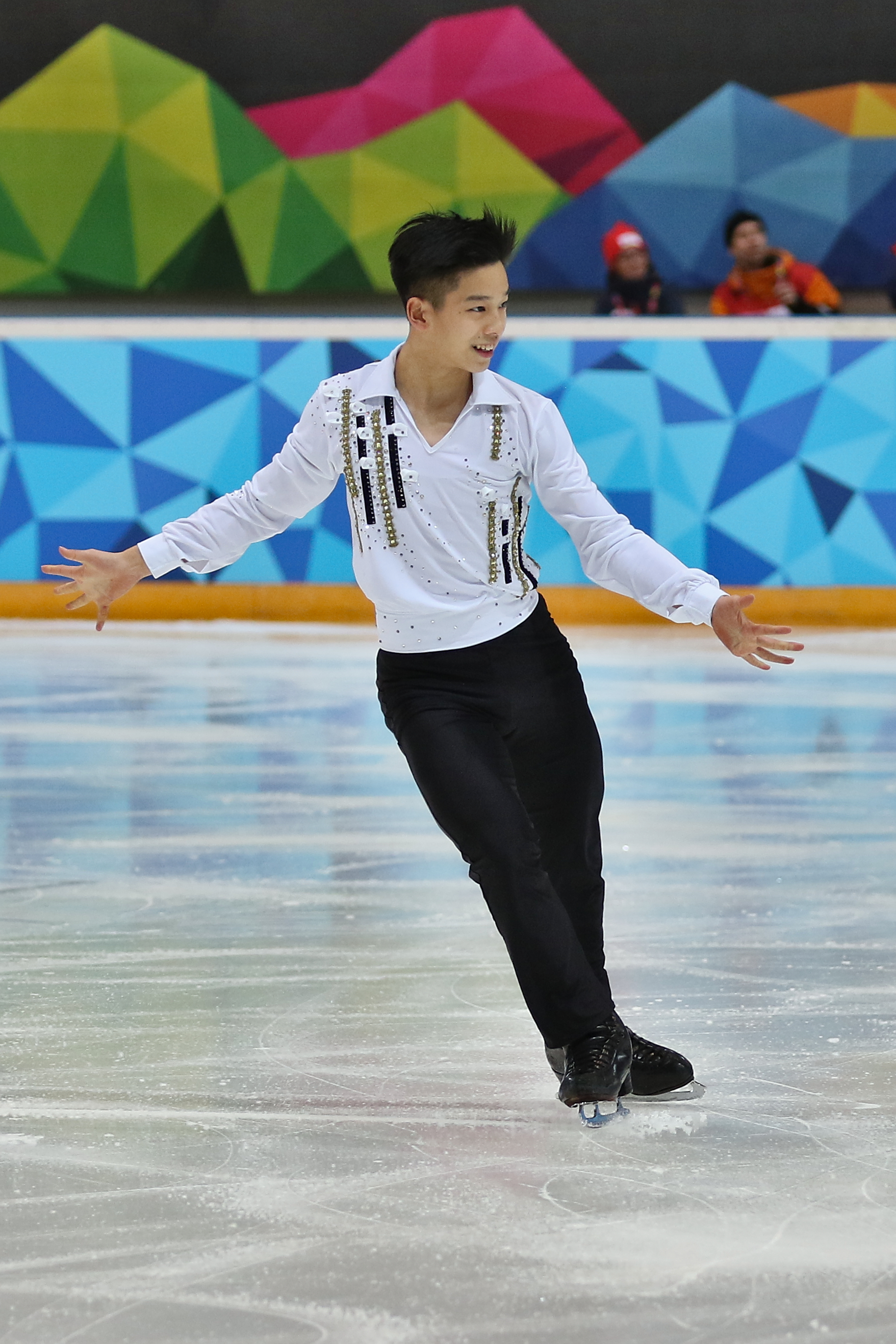
- Chew at the 2016 Winter Youth Olympics

Personal information
- Full name: Chew Kai Xiang
- Other names: Kai Xiang Chew
- Born: 11 July 1999 (age 26) Klang, Malaysia
- Height: 1.73 m (5 ft 8 in)

Figure skating career
- Country: Malaysia
- Skating club: Ice Skating Association of Malaysia
- Began skating: 2003
Medal record
Representing Malaysia
Men’s figure skating
Southeast Asian Games
Bronze medal – third place	2017 Kuala Lumpur	Men’s singles

Chinese name
- Traditional Chinese: 周凱翔
- Simplified Chinese: 周凯翔
- Hanyu Pinyin: Zhōu Kǎixiáng
- Jyutping: Zau1 Hoi2 Coeng4
- Hokkien POJ: Chiu Khái-siông
- Tâi-lô: Tsiu Khái-siông

Kai Xiang Chew (Chinese: 周凱翔; pinyin: Zhōu Kǎixiáng; Jyutping: Zau1 Hoi2 Coeng4; Pe̍h-ōe-jī: Chiu Khái-siông; born 11 July 1999) is a Malaysian figure skater.

== Career ==
Chew is a three-time Malaysian senior national silver medalist (2014–2016) and the 2013 Malaysian junior national champion. He has competed in the final segment of one ISU Figure Skating Championship, the 2017 Four Continents, finishing 23rd. He has also competed in the 2016 and 2017 World Junior Figure Skating Championships, finishing 37th and 42nd, respectively.

Chew trained without a coach during the 2018–19 season.

== Programs ==
Season	Short program	Free skating
2018-2019	Orange Coloured Sky performed by Michael Bublé	Earned It; Losers by The Weeknd
2017–2018	Orange Coloured Sky performed by Michael Bublé	Slow Dancing in the Big City by Bill Conti
2016–2017	Fanatico by Edvin Marton	Slow Dancing in the Big City by Bill Conti
2014–2016	Everything by Safri Duo	Guardians of the Gate by Audiomachine

== Results ==
CS: Challenger Series; JGP: Junior Grand Prix

International
Event	12–13	13–14	14–15	15–16	16–17	17–18	18–19
Four Continents					23rd	27th	25th
CS Tallinn Trophy						15th	
CS Warsaw Cup						10th	
Asian Games					14th		
SEA Games						3rd	
Toruń Cup					16th		
International: Junior
Junior Worlds				37th	42nd	26th	WD
Youth Olympics				11th			
JGP Austria				19th			
JGP Croatia				15th			
JGP Czech Rep.			16th				
JGP Germany					23rd		
JGP Japan					17th		
JGP Latvia						9th	
JGP Poland						13th	
Asian Open	3rd N		6th J	2nd J			
WD Trophy			1st J				
New Year's Cup		5th J					
National
Malaysia	1st J	2nd	2nd	2nd			
