= Christopher Caluza =

Filipino-American figure skater

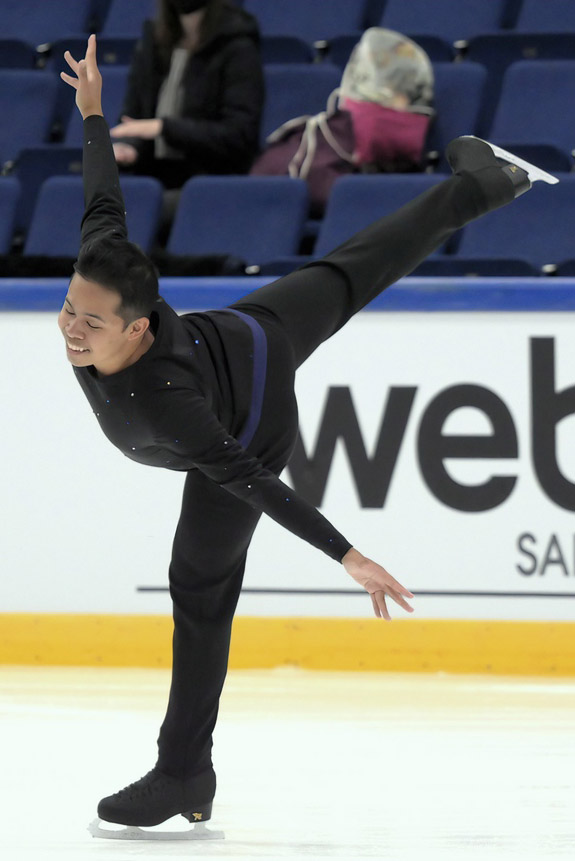
- Caluza performing a spiral at the 2021 Finlandia Trophy

Personal information
- Other names: CC
- Born: July 3, 1990 (age 36) Chula Vista, California
- Height: 1.60 m (5 ft 3 in)

Figure skating career
- Country: Philippines
- Coach: Natasha Bobrina
- Skating club: San Diego FSC
- Began skating: 1997
- Retired: November 23, 2021

Christopher Caluza (born July 3, 1990) is a retired Filipino-American figure skater. He is the 2013 Lombardia Trophy silver medalist, 2012 Bavarian Open bronze medalist, and the three-time Philippines national champion.

== Career ==
Caluza, who began skating on roller blades at age six, took up figure skating when he was seven following the roller rink's closure.

Caluza won the bronze medal at the 2012 Bavarian Open and at the same time earned the minimum score necessary to compete in an ISU Championships. He went on to place 12th at the 2012 Four Continents Championships and 21st at the 2012 World Championships.

The Philippines used the 2013 Four Continents to determine who would receive their sole men's spot at the 2013 World Championships. Caluza finished 14th, ahead of Michael Christian Martinez, and was sent to Worlds, where he finished 34th.

== Personal life ==
Caluza was born in Chula Vista, California. His parents are from the Philippines. He is a dual citizen of the United States and the Philippines. Caluza studied business at Palomar College. He came out as gay to his closest friends and family in 2015 while he was still in college.

== Programs ==
Season	Short program	Free skating
2021–2022	Claire de Lune by Claude Debussy	Experience by Ludovico Einaudi
2019–2020	Claire de Lune by Claude Debussy	La terre vue du ciel by Armand Amar
2013–2014	Arabesque by Claude Debussy	Piano Concerto in C Minor by Edvard Grieg
2012–2013	Alice in Wonderland by Danny Elfman	Concerto de Quebec by Andre Mathieu
2011–2012	Assassin's Tango (from Mr. & Mrs. Smith) by John Powell	Piano Concerto in A minor Op. 16 by Edvard Grieg

== Competitive highlights ==
=== For the Philippines ===
International
Event	2011–12	2012–13	2013–14	2018–19	2019–20	2021–22
World Championships	21st	34th	19th			
Four Continents	12th	14th	12th		18th	
CS Autumn Classic					8th	
CS Finlandia Trophy					10th	25th
CS Nebelhorn Trophy					7th	
Bavarian Open	3rd					
Cranberry Cup						10th
EduSport Trophy				1st		
Ice Challenge		5th				
Lombardia Trophy			2nd			
SEA Games					2nd	
U.S. Classic		6th	5th			10th
National
Philippine Championships	1st	1st	1st	2nd		

=== For the United States ===
Event	2009–10	2010–11
U.S. Championships	8th J.	19th
