= 2018 CS Asian Open Figure Skating Trophy =

- Type: ISU Challenger Series
- Date: August 1 – 5
- Season: 2018–19
- Location: Bangkok, Thailand
- Host: Figure and Speed Skating Association of Thailand
- Venue: IWIS International Training Center

Champions
- Men's singles: (Japan) Sōta Yamamoto
- Ladies' singles: (South Korea) Lim Eun-soo
- Pairs: (China) Peng Cheng / Jin Yang
- Ice dance: (China) Wang Shiyue / Liu Xinyu
- Next: 2018 CS Lombardia Trophy

The 2018 CS Asian Open Figure Skating Trophy was held from August 1–5, 2018, in Bangkok, Thailand. It was part of the 2018–19 ISU Challenger Series. Medals were awarded in men's singles, women's singles, pair skating, and ice dance.

== Entries ==
The International Skating Union published the list of entries on July 25, 2018.

| Country | Men | Ladies | Pairs | Ice dance |
|---|---|---|---|---|
| Australia | Jordan Dodds; Charlton Doherty; James Min | | | Chantelle Kerry / Andrew Dodds |
| China | | Chen Hongyi | Peng Cheng / Jin Yang | Ning Wanqi / Wang Chao; Wang Shiyue / Liu Xinyu |
| Chinese Taipei | Cheng Chih-sheng; Tsao Chih-i | Stephanie Yuung-shuh Cheng; Amy Lin | | |
| Hong Kong | Leslie Man Cheuk Ip; Kwun Hung Leung; Harrison Jon-Yen Wong | Hiu Ching Kwong; Yi Christy Leung; Joanna So | | |
| Indonesia | Alberto Widjaja | Erika Sanjaya | | |
| Japan | Mitsuki Sumoto; Sōta Yamamoto | Yuna Shiraiwa; Mako Yamashita | | Misato Komatsubara / Tim Koleto |
| North Korea | Han Kwang-bom | | Ryom Tae-ok / Kim Ju-sik | Phyo Yong-myong / Choe Min |
| Russia | Artem Lezheev | | | |
| Singapore | Chadwick Wang | | | |
| South Korea | Byun Se-jong; Park Geon-woo; Park Sung-hoon | Lim Eun-soo; Yoon Seo-young | | |
| Thailand | | Thita Lamsam | | Suthatta Yilansuwan / Karn Luanpreda / Hawraa H.M |
| United States | | Starr Andrews | | Rachel Parsons / Michael Parsons |

=== Changes to preliminary assignments ===
| Date | Discipline | Withdrew | Added | Notes | Ref. |
|---|---|---|---|---|---|
| July 27 | Pairs | (China) Tang Feiyao / Yang Yongchao | —N/a | Not senior age-eligible | |
| July 30 | Men | (South Korea) Lee Si-hyeong | (South Korea) Park Geon-woo | | |
| July 30 | Ice dance | —N/a | (United States) Rachel Parsons / Michael Parsons | | |

== Results ==
=== Men's singles ===
| Rank | Skater | Nation | Total points | SP | | FS | |
|---|---|---|---|---|---|---|---|
| 1st place, gold medalist(s) | Sōta Yamamoto | Japan | 198.92 | 6 | 57.92 | 1 | 141.00 |
| 2nd place, silver medalist(s) | Tsao Chih-i | Chinese Taipei | 195.40 | 1 | 65.57 | 2 | 129.83 |
| 3rd place, bronze medalist(s) | Byun Se-jong | South Korea | 193.38 | 2 | 65.47 | 3 | 127.91 |
| 4 | Mitsuki Sumoto | Japan | 182.39 | 3 | 63.65 | 4 | 118.74 |
| 5 | Artem Lezheev | Russia | 170.31 | 7 | 54.49 | 5 | 115.82 |
| 6 | Harrison Wong | Hong Kong | 166.26 | 4 | 58.78 | 6 | 107.48 |
| 7 | Park Sung-hoon | South Korea | 163.76 | 5 | 58.62 | 8 | 105.14 |
| 8 | James Min | Australia | 155.22 | 9 | 49.00 | 7 | 106.22 |
| 9 | Park Geon-woo | South Korea | 146.79 | 11 | 43.03 | 9 | 103.76 |
| 10 | Charlton Doherty | Australia | 137.75 | 10 | 47.82 | 10 | 89.93 |
| 11 | Han Kwang-bom | North Korea | 135.81 | 8 | 53.15 | 13 | 82.66 |
| 12 | Jordan Dodds | Australia | 126.13 | 13 | 41.30 | 12 | 84.83 |
| 13 | Chadwick Wang | Singapore | 121.07 | 17 | 34.57 | 11 | 86.50 |
| 14 | Leslie Ip | Hong Kong | 117.50 | 16 | 35.30 | 14 | 82.20 |
| 15 | Chih-Sheng Chang | Chinese Taipei | 116.51 | 12 | 41.57 | 15 | 74.94 |
| 16 | Kwun Hung Leung | Hong Kong | 104.30 | 15 | 35.55 | 16 | 68.75 |
| 17 | Alberto Widjaja | Indonesia | 101.86 | 14 | 36.85 | 17 | 65.01 |

=== Ladies' singles ===
| Rank | Skater | Nation | Total points | SP | | FS | |
|---|---|---|---|---|---|---|---|
| 1st place, gold medalist(s) | Lim Eun-soo | South Korea | 184.33 | 1 | 68.09 | 2 | 116.24 |
| 2nd place, silver medalist(s) | Yuna Shiraiwa | Japan | 173.01 | 4 | 54.47 | 1 | 118.54 |
| 3rd place, bronze medalist(s) | Mako Yamashita | Japan | 163.45 | 6 | 50.97 | 3 | 112.48 |
| 4 | Yi Christy Leung | Hong Kong | 161.01 | 3 | 57.99 | 4 | 103.02 |
| 5 | Starr Andrews | United States | 159.76 | 2 | 62.60 | 5 | 97.16 |
| 6 | Chen Hongyi | China | 140.88 | 5 | 53.06 | 6 | 87.82 |
| 7 | Amy Lin | Chinese Taipei | 121.58 | 7 | 44.40 | 7 | 77.18 |
| 8 | Hiu Ching Kwong | Hong Kong | 116.25 | 8 | 44.14 | 8 | 72.11 |
| 9 | Joanna So | Hong Kong | 97.82 | 9 | 32.38 | 9 | 65.44 |
| 10 | Yoon Seo-young | South Korea | 84.47 | 10 | 27.84 | 10 | 56.63 |
| 11 | Stephanie Yuung-Shuh Chang | Chinese Taipei | 72.73 | 11 | 23.90 | 11 | 48.83 |
| 12 | Erika Sanjaya | Indonesia | 69.84 | 12 | 21.60 | 12 | 48.24 |
| WD | Thita Lamsam | Thailand | withdrew from competition | | | | |

=== Pairs ===
Note: For this category, the 2018 Asian Open was not considered a Challenger Series event, since the minimum required number of entries for a Challenger Series event was not reached.

| Rank | Team | Nation | Total points | SP | | FS | |
|---|---|---|---|---|---|---|---|
| 1st place, gold medalist(s) | Peng Cheng / Jin Yang | China | 206.42 | 1 | 71.54 | 1 | 134.88 |
| 2nd place, silver medalist(s) | Ryom Tae-ok / Kim Ju-sik | North Korea | 173.20 | 2 | 60.40 | 2 | 112.80 |

=== Ice dance ===
| Rank | Team | Nation | Total points | RD | | FD | |
|---|---|---|---|---|---|---|---|
| 1st place, gold medalist(s) | Wang Shiyue / Liu Xinyu | China | 160.54 | 2 | 63.60 | 1 | 96.94 |
| 2nd place, silver medalist(s) | Rachel Parsons / Michael Parsons | United States | 157.13 | 1 | 64.47 | 3 | 92.66 |
| 3rd place, bronze medalist(s) | Misato Komatsubara / Timothy Koleto | Japan | 154.75 | 3 | 61.28 | 2 | 93.47 |
| 4 | Chantelle Kerry / Andrew Dodds | Australia | 123.23 | 5 | 43.59 | 4 | 79.64 |
| 5 | Ning Wanqi / Wang Chao | China | 116.89 | 4 | 43.71 | 5 | 73.18 |
| 6 | Phyo Yong-myong / Choe Min | North Korea | 91.64 | 6 | 34.82 | 6 | 56.82 |
| WD | Suthatta Yilansuwan / Karn Luanpreda | Thailand | withdrew from competition | | | | |
