= 2016 Four Continents Figure Skating Championships =

Figure skating competitions

2016 Four Continents Championships
- Type: ISU Championship
- Date: February 16 – 21
- Season: 2015–16
- Location: Taipei, Taiwan
- Host: Chinese Taipei Skating Union
- Venue: Taipei Arena

Champions
- Men's singles: (Canada) Patrick Chan
- Ladies' singles: (Japan) Satoko Miyahara
- Pairs: (China) Sui Wenjing / Han Cong
- Ice dance: (United States) Maia Shibutani / Alex Shibutani
- Previous: 2015 Four Continents Championships
- Next: 2017 Four Continents Championships

The 2016 Four Continents Figure Skating Championships was an international figure skating competition in the 2015–16 season. It was held at the Taipei Arena in Taipei, Taiwan on February 16–21. Medals were awarded in the disciplines of men's singles, ladies' singles, pair skating, and ice dancing.

== Qualification ==
The competition was open to skaters from non-European member nations of the International Skating Union who reached the age of 15 before 1 July 2015. The corresponding competition for European skaters was the 2016 European Figure Skating Championships.

National associations selected their entries based on their own criteria but the ISU mandated that their selections achieve a minimum technical elements score (TES) at an international event prior to the Four Continents.

=== Minimum TES ===
Minimum technical scores (TES)
Discipline	SP / SD	FS / FD
Men	25	45
Ladies	20	36
Pairs	20	36
Ice dance	19	29
Must be achieved at an ISU-recognized international event in the ongoing or preceding season. SP and FS scores may be attained at different events.

== Entries ==
The ISU published the list of entries on 28 January 2016. Some national associations announced their selections earlier.

Country	Men	Ladies	Pairs	Ice dancing
Argentina	Denis Margalik			
Australia	Andrew Dodds; Brendan Kerry	Kailani Craine; Brooklee Han; Katie Pasfield		Matilda Friend / William Badaoui
Canada	Patrick Chan; Liam Firus; Kevin Reynolds	Alaine Chartrand; Kaetlyn Osmond; Véronik Mallet	Meagan Duhamel / Eric Radford; Lubov Ilyushechkina / Dylan Moscovitch; Vanessa Grenier / Maxime Deschamps	Kaitlyn Weaver / Andrew Poje; Piper Gilles / Paul Poirier; Élisabeth Paradis / François-Xavier Ouellette
China	Jin Boyang; Song Nan; Yan Han	Li Zijun; Zhao Ziquan; Zheng Lu	Sui Wenjing / Han Cong; Yu Xiaoyu / Jin Yang	Li Xibei / Xiang Guangyao; Wang Shiyue / Liu Xinyu; Zhang Yiyi / Wu Nan
Chinese Taipei	Chih-I Tsao	Amy Lin		
North Korea			Ryom Tae-ok / Kim Ju-sik	
Hong Kong	Leslie Ip; Harry Hau Yin Lee	Maisy Hiu Ching Ma		
Japan	Shoma Uno; Takahito Mura; Keiji Tanaka	Satoko Miyahara; Rika Hongo; Kanako Murakami	Sumire Suto / Francis Boudreau-Audet	Kana Muramoto / Chris Reed; Emi Hirai / Marien de la Asuncion
Kazakhstan				Anastasia Khromova / Daryn Zhunussov
Malaysia	Julian Zhi Jie Yee			
Philippines	Michael Christian Martinez			
South Korea	Kim Jin-seo; Lee June-hyoung; Byun Se-jong	Choi Da-bin; Park So-youn; Kim Na-hyun		Rebeka Kim / Kirill Minov; Lee Ho-jung / Richard Kang-in Kam; Min Yura / Alexander Gamelin
South Africa		Michaela Du Toit		
Thailand		Thita Lamsam		
United States	Max Aaron; Grant Hochstein; Ross Miner	Karen Chen; Gracie Gold; Mirai Nagasu	Marissa Castelli / Mervin Tran; Tarah Kayne / Daniel O'Shea; Alexa Scimeca / Chris Knierim	Madison Chock / Evan Bates; Madison Hubbell / Zachary Donohue; Maia Shibutani / Alex Shibutani

- On 15 January 2016, Mao Asada withdrew from the event to focus on Worlds. She was replaced by Kanako Murakami.
- On 26 January 2016, Ashley Wagner withdrew from the event to focus on Worlds. She was replaced by Mirai Nagasu.
- On 4 February 2016, it was announced that Adam Rippon had withdrawn from the event to focus on Worlds. He was replaced by Ross Miner.
- On 11 February 2016, Skate Canada announced that Gabrielle Daleman and Julianne Séguin / Charlie Bilodeau had withdrawn from the event as a precaution – Daleman and Séguin having sustained minor injuries in practice – and would be replaced by Véronik Mallet and Vanessa Grenier / Maxime Deschamps, respectively.
- On 12 February 2016, Polina Edmunds withdrew from the event "due to lack of time to break in my new skates." She was replaced by Karen Chen.
- On 20 February 2016, Meagan Duhamel / Eric Radford withdrew before the free skating due to Duhamel's illness.

== Results ==
=== Men ===
Rank	Name	Nation	Total points	SP		FS	
1	Patrick Chan	Canada	290.21	5	86.22	1	203.99
2	Jin Boyang	China	289.83	1	98.45	2	191.38
3	Yan Han	China	271.55	3	89.57	3	181.98
4	Shoma Uno	Japan	269.81	2	92.99	5	176.82
5	Takahito Mura	Japan	268.43	4	89.08	4	179.35
6	Keiji Tanaka	Japan	222.70	7	74.82	7	147.88
7	Max Aaron	United States	220.94	8	69.48	6	151.46
8	Grant Hochstein	United States	216.34	6	75.79	10	140.55
9	Michael Christian Martinez	Philippines	211.59	9	69.15	9	142.44
10	Kim Jin-seo	South Korea	201.43	12	65.13	11	136.30
11	Kevin Reynolds	Canada	198.87	20	55.14	8	143.73
12	Song Nan	China	194.81	11	66.04	15	128.77
13	Liam Firus	Canada	194.02	14	61.81	13	132.21
14	Ross Miner	United States	191.12	17	58.27	12	132.85
15	Julian Zhi Jie Yee	Malaysia	190.32	15	59.70	14	130.62
16	Lee June-hyoung	South Korea	180.92	10	67.35	19	113.57
17	Denis Margalik	Argentina	177.65	18	57.71	16	119.94
18	Byun Se-jong	South Korea	176.15	16	58.30	17	117.85
19	Brendan Kerry	Australia	172.26	19	55.83	18	116.43
20	Andrew Dodds	Australia	161.47	13	61.88	21	99.59
21	Chih-I Tsao	Chinese Taipei	159.13	22	51.83	20	107.30
22	Leslie Ip	Hong Kong	152.29	21	54.81	22	97.48
23	Harry Hau Yin Lee	Hong Kong	110.95	23	42.54	23	68.41

=== Ladies ===
Rank	Name	Nation	Total points	SP		FS	
1	Satoko Miyahara	Japan	214.91	1	72.48	1	142.43
2	Mirai Nagasu	United States	193.86	3	66.06	2	127.80
3	Rika Hongo	Japan	181.78	4	64.27	5	117.51
4	Park So-youn	South Korea	178.92	5	62.49	7	116.43
5	Gracie Gold	United States	178.39	9	57.26	3	121.13
6	Kaetlyn Osmond	Canada	175.63	11	56.14	4	119.49
7	Kanako Murakami	Japan	175.12	2	68.51	13	106.61
8	Choi Da-bin	South Korea	173.71	10	56.79	6	116.92
9	Kim Na-hyun	South Korea	170.70	8	58.40	8	112.30
10	Li Zijun	China	167.88	6	60.04	11	107.84
11	Alaine Chartrand	Canada	165.73	7	59.71	14	106.02
12	Karen Chen	United States	161.52	12	53.55	10	107.97
13	Kailani Craine	Australia	157.82	16	49.02	9	108.80
14	Véronik Mallet	Canada	155.98	15	51.88	15	104.10
15	Amy Lin	Chinese Taipei	155.61	17	47.88	12	107.73
16	Zhao Ziquan	China	147.79	13	53.24	16	94.55
17	Brooklee Han	Australia	135.75	14	52.80	17	82.95
18	Michaela Du Toit	South Africa	121.12	19	45.18	18	75.94
19	Zheng Lu	China	118.73	18	45.72	20	73.01
20	Maisy Hiu Ching Ma	Hong Kong	115.10	20	42.06	19	73.04
21	Katie Pasfield	Australia	95.78	22	34.63	21	61.15
22	Thita Lamsam	Thailand	89.56	21	38.91	22	50.65

=== Pairs ===
Rank	Name	Nation	Total points	SP		FS	
1	Sui Wenjing / Han Cong	China	221.91	1	78.51	1	143.40
2	Alexa Scimeca / Chris Knierim	United States	207.96	3	67.61	2	140.35
3	Yu Xiaoyu / Jin Yang	China	187.33	4	64.99	3	122.34
4	Tarah Kayne / Daniel O'Shea	United States	182.02	7	59.72	4	122.30
5	Lubov Ilyushechkina / Dylan Moscovitch	Canada	179.67	5	61.97	5	117.70
6	Marissa Castelli / Mervin Tran	United States	175.08	6	61.34	6	113.74
7	Ryom Tae-ok / Kim Ju-sik	North Korea	157.24	8	53.83	7	103.41
8	Vanessa Grenier / Maxime Deschamps	Canada	148.82	10	50.07	8	98.75
9	Sumire Suto / Francis Boudreau Audet	Japan	145.33	9	52.70	9	92.63
WD	Meagan Duhamel / Eric Radford	Canada	withdrew	2	71.90	withdrew from competition	

=== Ice dancing ===
Rank	Name	Nation	Total points	SD		FD	
1	Maia Shibutani / Alex Shibutani	United States	181.62	1	72.86	1	108.76
2	Madison Chock / Evan Bates	United States	174.64	4	67.05	2	107.59
3	Kaitlyn Weaver / Andrew Poje	Canada	173.85	2	72.42	4	101.43
4	Madison Hubbell / Zachary Donohue	United States	172.29	3	69.36	3	102.93
5	Piper Gilles / Paul Poirier	Canada	162.19	5	63.92	5	98.27
6	Élisabeth Paradis / François-Xavier Ouellette	Canada	146.94	6	60.15	7	86.79
7	Kana Muramoto / Chris Reed	Japan	145.83	7	57.13	6	88.70
8	Min Yura / Alexander Gamelin	South Korea	138.42	9	55.23	8	83.19
9	Wang Shiyue / Liu Xinyu	China	135.57	8	56.49	10	79.08
10	Lee Ho-jung / Richard Kang-in Kam	South Korea	128.27	11	47.46	9	80.81
11	Rebeka Kim / Kirill Minov	South Korea	122.69	13	44.69	11	78.00
12	Emi Hirai / Marien de la Asuncion	Japan	117.06	12	47.09	13	69.97
13	Zhang Yiyi / Wu Nan	China	114.84	14	42.01	12	72.83
14	Anastasia Khromova / Daryn Zhunussov	Kazakhstan	110.71	10	48.19	15	62.52
15	Li Xibei / Xiang Guangyao	China	103.75	15	39.64	14	64.11
16	Matilda Friend / William Badaoui	Australia	85.70	16	33.00	16	52.70

== Medals summary ==
=== Medalists ===
Medals for overall placement:

Discipline	Gold	Silver	Bronze
Men	(Canada) Patrick Chan	(China) Jin Boyang	(China) Yan Han
Ladies	(Japan) Satoko Miyahara	(United States) Mirai Nagasu	(Japan) Rika Hongo
Pairs	(China) Sui Wenjing / Han Cong	(United States) Alexa Scimeca / Chris Knierim	(China) Yu Xiaoyu / Jin Yang
Ice dancing	(United States) Maia Shibutani / Alex Shibutani	(United States) Madison Chock / Evan Bates	(Canada) Kaitlyn Weaver / Andrew Poje

Small medals for placement in the short segment:

Discipline	Gold	Silver	Bronze
Men	(China) Jin Boyang	(Japan) Shoma Uno	(China) Yan Han
Ladies	(Japan) Satoko Miyahara	(Japan) Kanako Murakami	(United States) Mirai Nagasu
Pairs	(China) Sui Wenjing / Han Cong	(Canada) Meagan Duhamel / Eric Radford	(United States) Alexa Scimeca / Chris Knierim
Ice dancing	(United States) Maia Shibutani / Alex Shibutani	(Canada) Kaitlyn Weaver / Andrew Poje	(United States) Madison Hubbell / Zachary Donohue

Small medals for placement in the free segment:

Discipline	Gold	Silver	Bronze
Men	(Canada) Patrick Chan	(China) Jin Boyang	(China) Yan Han
Ladies	(Japan) Satoko Miyahara	(United States) Mirai Nagasu	(United States) Gracie Gold
Pairs	(China) Sui Wenjing / Han Cong	(United States) Alexa Scimeca / Chris Knierim	(China) Yu Xiaoyu / Jin Yang
Ice dancing	(United States) Maia Shibutani / Alex Shibutani	(United States) Madison Chock / Evan Bates	(United States) Madison Hubbell / Zachary Donohue

=== Medals by country ===
Table of medals for overall placement:

Rank	Nation	Gold	Silver	Bronze	Total
1	United States (USA)	1	3	0	4
2	China (CHN)	1	1	2	4
3	Canada (CAN)	1	0	1	2
3	Japan (JPN)	1	0	1	2
Totals (4 entries)		4	4	4	12

== See also ==
- List of sporting events in Taiwan
