= 2019 Cup of China =

Figure skating competition

- Type: Grand Prix
- Date: November 8 – 10
- Season: 2019–20
- Location: Chongqing
- Host: Chinese Skating Association
- Venue: Chongqing Huaxi Culture and Sports Center

Champions
- Men's singles: (China) Jin Boyang
- Ladies' singles: (Russia) Anna Shcherbakova
- Pairs: (China) Sui Wenjing / Han Cong
- Ice dance: (Russia) Victoria Sinitsina / Nikita Katsalapov
- Previous: 2017 Cup of China
- Next: 2020 Cup of China
- Previous Grand Prix: 2019 Internationaux de France
- Next Grand Prix: 2019 Rostelecom Cup

The 2019 SHISEIDO Cup of China was the fourth event of the 2019–20 ISU Grand Prix of Figure Skating, a senior-level international invitational competition series. It was held at Chongqing Huaxi Culture and Sports Center in Chongqing, China from November 8–10. Medals were awarded in the disciplines of men's singles, ladies' singles, pair skating, and ice dance. Skaters earned points toward qualifying for the 2019–20 Grand Prix Final.

== Entries ==
The ISU announced the preliminary assignments on June 20, 2019.

Country	Men	Ladies	Pairs	Ice dance
Australia	Brendan Kerry	Kailani Craine		
Canada	Keegan Messing; Conrad Orzel		Liubov Ilyushechkina / Charlie Bilodeau	Laurence Fournier Beaudry / Nikolaj Sørensen
China	Jin Boyang; Yan Han; Zhang He	Chen Hongyi; Zhu Yi	Peng Cheng / Jin Yang; Sui Wenjing / Han Cong; Tang Feiyao / Yang Yongchao	Chen Hong / Sun Zhuoming; Guo Yuzhu / Zhao Pengkun; Wang Shiyue / Liu Xinyu
Chinese Taipei	Tsao Chih-i			
Hong Kong		Yi Christy Leung		
Italy	Matteo Rizzo		Nicole Della Monica / Matteo Guarise	
Japan	Keiji Tanaka	Marin Honda; Satoko Miyahara		Misato Komatsubara / Tim Koleto
North Korea			Ryom Tae-ok / Kim Ju-sik	
Russia	Andrei Lazukin	Sofia Samodurova; Anna Shcherbakova; Elizaveta Tuktamysheva	Alisa Efimova / Alexander Korovin	Sofia Evdokimova / Egor Bazin; Victoria Sinitsina / Nikita Katsalapov; Anastasia Skoptcova / Kirill Aleshin
South Korea	Cha Jun-hwan	Choi Yu-jin; You Young		
United States	Camden Pulkinen	Amber Glenn	Tarah Kayne / Danny O'Shea	Madison Chock / Evan Bates; Kaitlin Hawayek / Jean-Luc Baker

=== Changes to preliminary assignments ===
Discipline	Withdrew		Added		Notes	Ref.
Discipline	Date	Skater(s)	Date	Skater(s)	Notes	Ref.
Men	—		September 23	(China) Zhang He	Host picks	
Pairs	—		September 23	(China) Tang Feiyao / Yang Yongchao	Host picks	
Ice dance	—		September 23	(China) Guo Yuzhu / Zhao Pengkun	Host picks	
Ladies	—		October 14	(Hong Kong) Yi Christy Leung	Host picks	
Ladies	October 20	(Japan) Mai Mihara	October 25	(Australia) Kailani Craine	Health	
Men	October 22	(United States) Vincent Zhou	October 25	(Canada) Conrad Orzel	Personal reasons	
Men	October 25	(Russia) Roman Savosin	October 26	(Australia) Brendan Kerry		
Ladies	October 25	(Kazakhstan) Elizabet Tursynbaeva	October 28	(South Korea) You Young	Injury	
Ladies	October 29	(Finland) Viveca Lindfors	November 1	(United States) Amber Glenn		
Ladies	October 30	(Canada) Gabrielle Daleman	November 1	(South Korea) Choi Yu-jin	Health	

== Results ==
=== Men ===
Rank	Name	Nation	Total points	SP		FS	
1	Jin Boyang	China	261.53	2	85.43	1	176.10
2	Yan Han	China	249.45	1	86.46	2	162.99
3	Matteo Rizzo	Italy	241.88	3	81.72	4	160.15
4	Keegan Messing	Canada	237.36	5	76.80	3	160.56
5	Keiji Tanaka	Japan	233.63	7	74.64	5	158.98
6	Cha Jun-hwan	South Korea	222.26	11	69.40	6	152.86
7	Brendan Kerry	Australia	220.31	9	73.96	7	146.35
8	Camden Pulkinen	United States	218.67	4	78.92	9	139.75
9	Zhang He	China	217.42	6	76.03	8	141.39
10	Andrei Lazukin	Russia	210.01	8	74.31	10	135.70
11	Conrad Orzel	Canada	192.60	10	72.22	12	120.38
12	Tsao Chih-i	Chinese Taipei	186.82	12	64.07	11	122.75

=== Ladies ===
Rank	Name	Nation	Total points	SP		FS	
1	Anna Shcherbakova	Russia	226.04	1	73.51	1	152.53
2	Satoko Miyahara	Japan	211.18	2	68.91	3	142.27
3	Elizaveta Tuktamysheva	Russia	209.10	4	65.57	2	143.53
4	You Young	South Korea	191.81	7	61.49	4	130.32
5	Sofia Samodurova	Russia	185.29	5	63.99	5	121.30
6	Amber Glenn	United States	178.35	3	67.69	6	110.66
7	Marin Honda	Japan	168.09	6	61.73	7	106.36
8	Yi Christy Leung	Hong Kong	157.47	8	53.90	9	103.57
9	Chen Hongyi	China	155.12	11	49.44	8	105.68
10	Kailani Craine	Australia	149.83	10	53.01	10	96.82
11	Zhu Yi	China	139.63	9	53.19	11	86.44
12	Choi Yu-jin	South Korea	131.48	12	48.75	12	82.73

=== Pairs ===
Rank	Name	Nation	Total points	SP		FS	
1	Sui Wenjing / Han Cong	China	228.37	1	80.90	1	147.47
2	Peng Cheng / Jin Yang	China	199.97	3	68.50	2	131.47
3	Liubov Ilyushechkina / Charlie Bilodeau	Canada	190.73	2	68.98	3	121.75
4	Nicole Della Monica / Matteo Guarise	Italy	182.88	4	64.24	5	118.64
5	Ryom Tae-ok / Kim Ju-sik	North Korea	179.55	8	60.50	4	119.05
6	Tarah Kayne / Danny O'Shea	United States	178.79	5	64.08	6	114.71
7	Tang Feiyao / Yang Yongchao	China	172.63	7	61.85	7	110.68
8	Alisa Efimova / Alexander Korovin	Russia	170.19	6	63.97	8	106.22

=== Ice dance ===
Rank	Name	Nation	Total points	RD		FD	
1	Victoria Sinitsina / Nikita Katsalapov	Russia	209.90	1	85.39	2	124.51
2	Madison Chock / Evan Bates	United States	208.55	2	80.34	1	128.21
3	Laurence Fournier Beaudry / Nikolaj Sørensen	Canada	190.74	3	78.41	3	112.33
4	Wang Shiyue / Liu Xinyu	China	186.45	4	74.77	4	111.68
5	Kaitlin Hawayek / Jean-Luc Baker	United States	179.96	5	74.70	5	105.26
6	Sofia Evdokimova / Egor Bazin	Russia	169.27	7	64.07	6	105.20
7	Anastasia Skoptcova / Kirill Aleshin	Russia	169.24	6	69.19	8	100.05
8	Chen Hong / Sun Zhuoming	China	162.91	8	61.83	7	101.08
9	Guo Yuzhu / Zhao Pengkun	China	150.91	9	57.10	9	93.81
10	Misato Komatsubara / Tim Koleto	Japan	145.35	10	56.60	10	88.75
