= Charlie Bilodeau =

Canadian pair skater

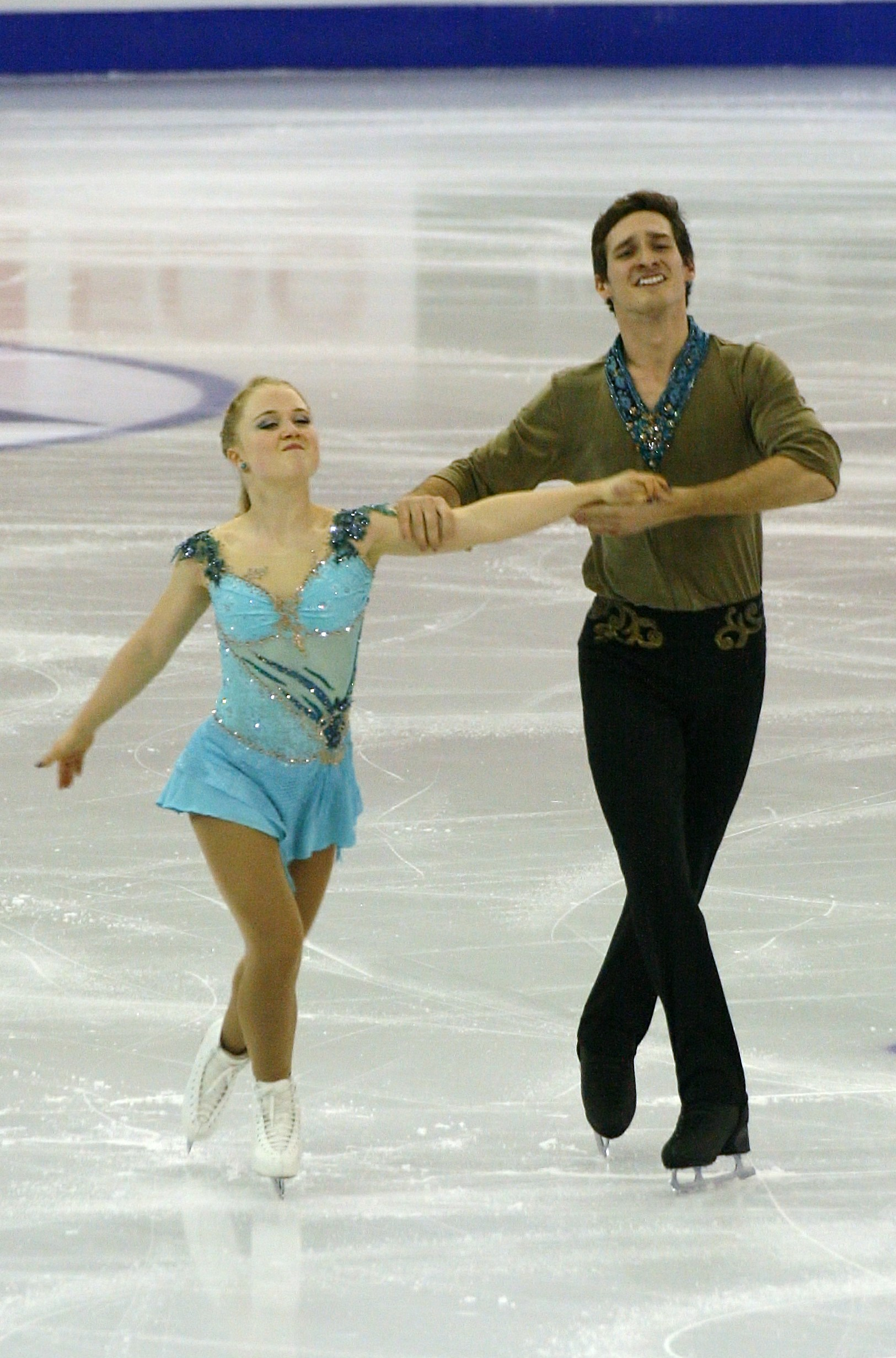
- Séguin and Bilodeau at the 2015–16 Grand Prix Final

Personal information
- Born: August 6, 1993 (age 33) Rimouski, Quebec, Canada
- Home town: Montreal, Quebec
- Height: 1.80 m (5 ft 11 in)

Figure skating career
- Country: Canada
- Coach: Richard Gauthier
- Skating club: CPA Drummondville
- Began skating: 1996
- Retired: April 16th 2020
Medal record
Representing Canada
Figure skating: Pairs
World Junior Championships
Silver medal – second place	2015 Tallinn	Pairs
Junior Grand Prix Final
Gold medal – first place	2014–15 Barcelona	Pairs

Charlie Bilodeau (born August 6, 1993) is a retired Canadian pair skater.

With former partner Julianne Séguin, he is the 2016 Skate America champion, the 2015 World Junior silver medallist, the 2014 Junior Grand Prix Final champion, and a three-time Canadian national medallist.

They placed 9th at the 2018 Winter Olympics.

With former partner Liubov Ilyushechkina he is the 2019 Cup of China bronze medalist, the 2019 CSFinlandia Trophy bronze medalist, and the 2020 Canadian national bronze medalist.

== Personal life ==
Charlie Bilodeau was born on August 6, 1993, in Rimouski, Quebec, Canada. He is the brother of singer-songwriter Marilie Bilodeau. His father died from diabetes in 2014. He speaks French and English.

== Skating career ==
=== Early years ===
Bilodeau began learning to skate in 1996. He teamed up with Krystel Desjardins by 2008. The pair won gold on the novice level at the 2010 Canadian Championships and silver on the junior level at the 2012 Canadian Championships. They debuted on the ISU Junior Grand Prix series in the 2012–2013 season but ended their partnership after placing tenth in Lake Placid, New York and ninth in Zagreb, Croatia.

Bilodeau teamed up with Julianne Séguin in November 2012.

=== 2013–2014 season: Debut of Séguin/Bilodeau ===
Séguin/Bilodeau debuted internationally in autumn 2013. Competing in the 2013–14 ISU Junior Grand Prix series, they placed fourth in the Czech Republic and fifth in Belarus. They won the junior silver medal at the 2014 Canadian Championships and were assigned to represent Canada at the 2014 World Junior Championships. The pair withdrew due to Séguin's back injury.

=== 2014–2015 season: Junior World silver ===
During the 2014 JGP series, Séguin/Bilodeau outscored Russia's Lina Fedorova / Maxim Miroshkin for the gold medal in Ostrava, Czech Republic. Upon winning another gold in Dresden, Germany, the pair qualified for the JGP Final. At the latter event, held in December 2014 in Barcelona, they placed first in both segments and won the gold medal by a margin of 9.79 points over Fedorova/Miroshkin.

In January 2015, Séguin/Bilodeau took the senior bronze medal at the Canadian Championships and were named in Canada's teams to the junior and senior World Championships. In February, they were awarded the silver medal at Junior Worlds in Tallinn, Estonia, having placed second to China's Yu Xiaoyu / Jin Yang. In March, they ranked tenth in both segments and finished eighth overall at the World Championships in Shanghai, China.

=== 2015–2016 season: Injury ===
Séguin/Bilodeau won silver at the 2016 Canadian Nationals. While practicing a throw jump in early February, she injured her ankle, resulting in torn ligaments and a bone contusion which would take two to three months to heal. The pair withdrew from the 2016 Four Continents. They later withdrew from 2016 Worlds as well, stating that the injury was not fully healed and they had missed many practices.

=== 2016–2017 season: Grand Prix gold ===
Séguin/Bilodeau won the 2016 CS Autumn Classic International and 2016 Skate America. They finished fifth at the 2016 Rostelecom Cup and 2016–17 Grand Prix Final. Séguin sustained a concussion on December 24, 2016, and did not resume training until February 1, 2017. As a result, the pair withdrew from the 2017 Canadian Championships. They placed 11th at the 2017 World Championships in Helsinki, Finland.

Séguin sustained two further concussions – the second occurred at an ice show in April and the third while practicing a lift in July 2017. Bilodeau underwent a knee operation in June 2017.

=== 2017–2018 season: Pyeongchang Olympics ===
Séguin/Bilodeau began their season with bronze at the 2017 CS Autumn Classic International. Their Grand Prix results – fifth at the 2017 Rostelecom Cup and fourth at the 2017 NHK Trophy – were insufficient to qualify to the Grand Prix Final. At the Rostelecom Cup, Séguin experienced blurred vision, dizziness, and nausea. Her concussion-related symptoms continued until December and in a later interview she said that, with the Olympics approaching, she took risks that she would not normally have taken.

In January, Séguin/Bilodeau won the silver medal at the 2018 Canadian Championships, having placed second in both segments, and were nominated to represent Canada at the Olympics. The two placed twelfth in the short, eighth in the free, and ninth overall at the 2018 Winter Olympics, which took place in February in Pyeongchang, South Korea. The pair had less success at the 2018 World Championships in Milan, Italy. Ranked twenty-second in the short program, they would not qualify to the free skate.

=== 2018–2019 season: End of Séguin/Bilodeau ===
Séguin/Bilodeau were invited to the 2018 Grand Prix of Helsinki and the 2018 Internationaux de France. They planned to use Groove Is in the Heart by Deee-Lite for the short program and Wicked Game by Theory of a Deadman for the free skate. However, in mid-July 2018, Bilodeau decided to dissolve their partnership.

On March 4, 2019, Skate Canada announced that Bilodeau had formed a new partnership with Liubov Ilyushechkina, whose previous partner, Dylan Moscovitch, had retired at the end of the 2017–18 season. The new pair will train in Montreal with coaches Richard Gauthier and Bruno Marcotte.

=== 2019–2020 season: Debut of Ilyushechkina/Bilodeau ===
Ilyushechkina/Bilodeau made their competitive debut at the 2019 CS Finlandia Trophy. Placing third in the short program and second in the free skate, they won the bronze medal, less than a point behind silver medalists Alisa Efimova / Alexander Korovin. Bilodeau remarked "for a first ever international competition together with only seven months training we couldn't have hoped for better." For their Grand Prix debut, the team began at 2019 Skate Canada International, where they were fifth. At their second Grand Prix, the 2019 Cup of China, they placed second in the short program with their third consecutive short program score of around 68 points, what Ilyushechkina deemed their "lucky 68". They were third in the free skate after a number of jump and throw errors, taking the bronze medal overall. Bilodeau said "it means a lot to us to have won a medal in only our second Grand Prix together. It shows that it was a good decision to come back and to skate together."

Entering the 2020 Canadian Championships favoured to win the silver medal, Ilyushechkina/Bilodeau placed second in the short program behind defending champions Moore-Towers/Marinaro, and slightly ahead of defending silver medalists Walsh/Michaud. Ilyushechkina's underrotation on her triple toe loop was the only program error. In the free skate, she underrotated on both side-by-side jumps and fell on both throw jump attempts, dropping them to third place overall. Ilyushechkina afterward described it as "one blended set of errors" that left her "very unsatisfied." At the 2020 Four Continents Championships, they had several errors in both programs, placing seventh, again behind Walsh/Michaud, who were sixth. As a result, Skate Canada assigned Walsh/Michaud to Canada's second pairs berth at the 2020 World Championships.

On April 16, 2020, Bilodeau announced his retirement from the sport.

== Programs ==
=== With Ilyushechkina ===
Season	Short program	Free skating	Exhibition
2019–2020	My Funny Valentine by Richard Rodgers & Lorenz Hart performed by Michael Bublé choreo. by Marie-France Dubreuil & Guillaume Cizeron	Je voudrais voir la mer performed by Michel Rivard choreo. by Marie-France Dubreuil & Guillaume Cizeron	Feel It Still by Portugal. The Man

=== With Séguin ===
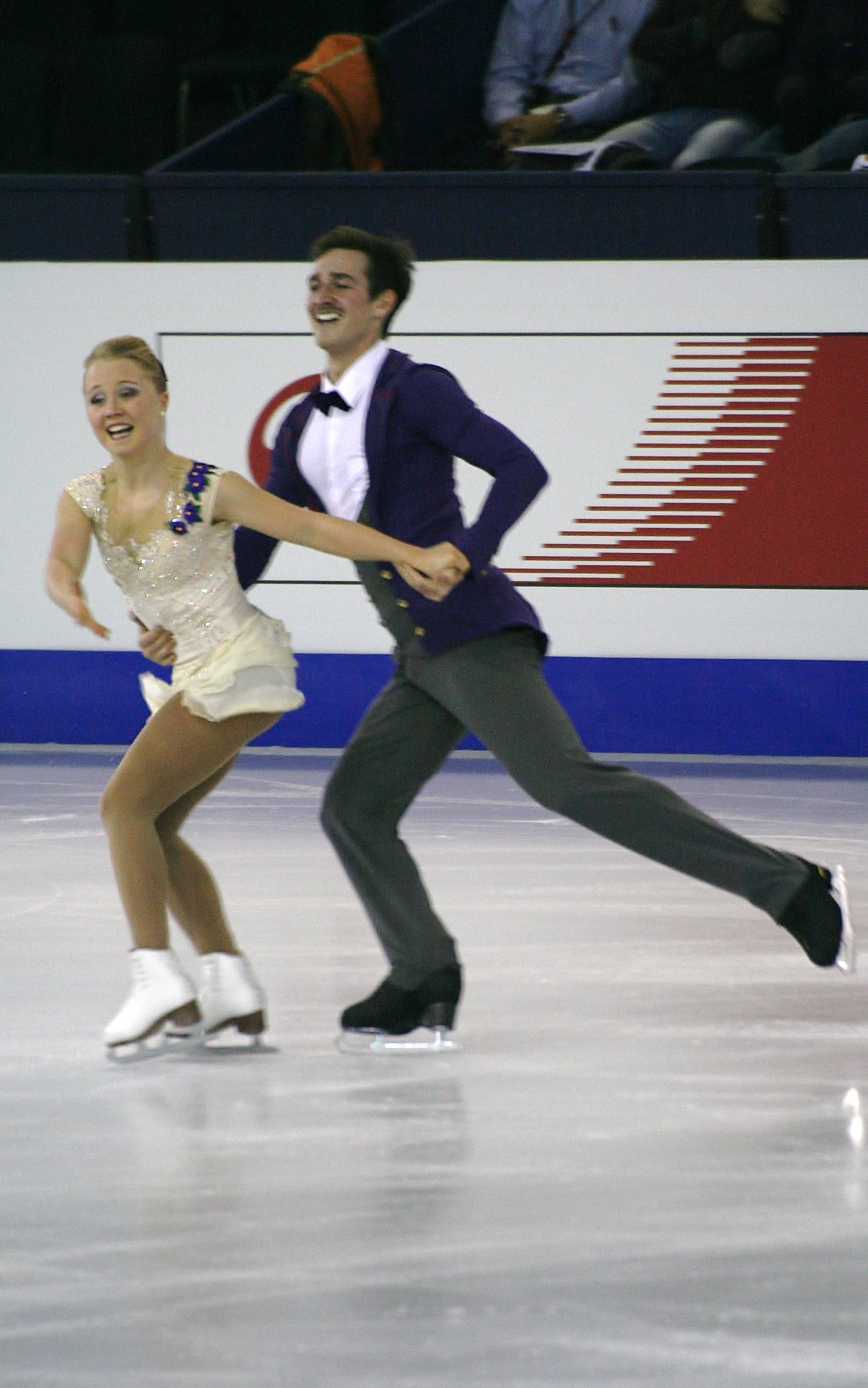
Séguin/Bilodeau at the 2014–15 Junior Grand Prix Final

Season	Short program	Free skating	Exhibition
2017–2018	Everybody Wants to Rule the World by Roland Orzabal, Ian Stanley, Chris Hughes performed by Lorde	Where's My Love by SYML	Charley, My Boy
2016–2017	Monde Inversé (from Kurios) by Raphaël Beau, Guy Dubuc, Marc Lessard; Skokiaan by Louis Armstrong	Cinema Paradiso by Ennio Morricone, Andrea Morricone choreo. by Marie-France Dubreuil, David Wilson	Shut Up and Dance by Walk the Moon
2015–2016	Monde Inversé (from Kurios) by Raphaël Beau, Guy Dubuc, Marc Lessard choreo. by Shae-Lynn Bourne, Shae Zukiwsky	A Whiter Shade of Pale by Procol Harum performed with The Danish National Concert Orchestra and Choir choreo. by Marie-France Dubreuil, Patrice Lauzon	Shut Up and Dance by Walk the Moon; If You've Only Got A Mustache by Stephen Foster
2014–2015	The Grand Budapest Hotel; s'Rothe-Zäuerli by Öse Schuppel; The Family Desgoffe und Taxis by Alexandre Desplat choreo. by Shae Zukiwsky	In Your Eyes; Wallflower by Peter Gabriel choreo. by Marie-France Dubreuil, Patrice Lauzon	If You've Only Got A Mustache by Stephen Foster
2013–2014	Do You Only Wanna Dance (from Dirty Dancing: Havana Nights)	James Bond by John Barry: Oddjob's Pressing Engagement (from Goldfinger); On Her Majesty's Secret Service; Alpine Drive Auric's Factory; Into Miami (from Goldfinger)	

=== With Desjardins ===
Season	Short program	Free skating
2012–2013	The Nutcracker by Pyotr I. Tchaikovsky	The Umbrellas of Cherbourg by Michel Legrand

== Competitive highlights ==
GP: Grand Prix; CS: Challenger Series; JGP: Junior Grand Prix

=== With Ilyushechkina ===
International
Event	19–20
Four Continents	7th
GP Cup of China	3rd
GP Skate Canada	5th
CS Finlandia Trophy	3rd
National
Canadian Champ.	3rd

=== With Séguin ===
International
Event	13–14	14–15	15–16	16–17	17–18
Olympics					9th
Worlds		8th	WD	11th	22nd
Four Continents			WD		
GP Final			4th	5th	
GP Finland					
GP France			3rd		
GP NHK Trophy					4th
GP Rostelecom Cup				5th	5th
GP Skate America			3rd	1st	
CS Autumn Classic				1st	3rd
CS Nebelhorn			5th		
International: Junior
Junior Worlds	WD	2nd			
JGP Final		1st			
JGP Belarus	4th				
JGP Czech Republic	4th	1st			
JGP Germany		1st			
National
Canadian Champ.	2nd J	3rd	2nd	WD	2nd

=== With Desjardins ===
International
Event	10–11	11–12	12–13
JGP Croatia			9th
JGP United States			10th
National
Canadian Champ.	5th J	2nd J	
