= Julianne Séguin =

Canadian pair skater

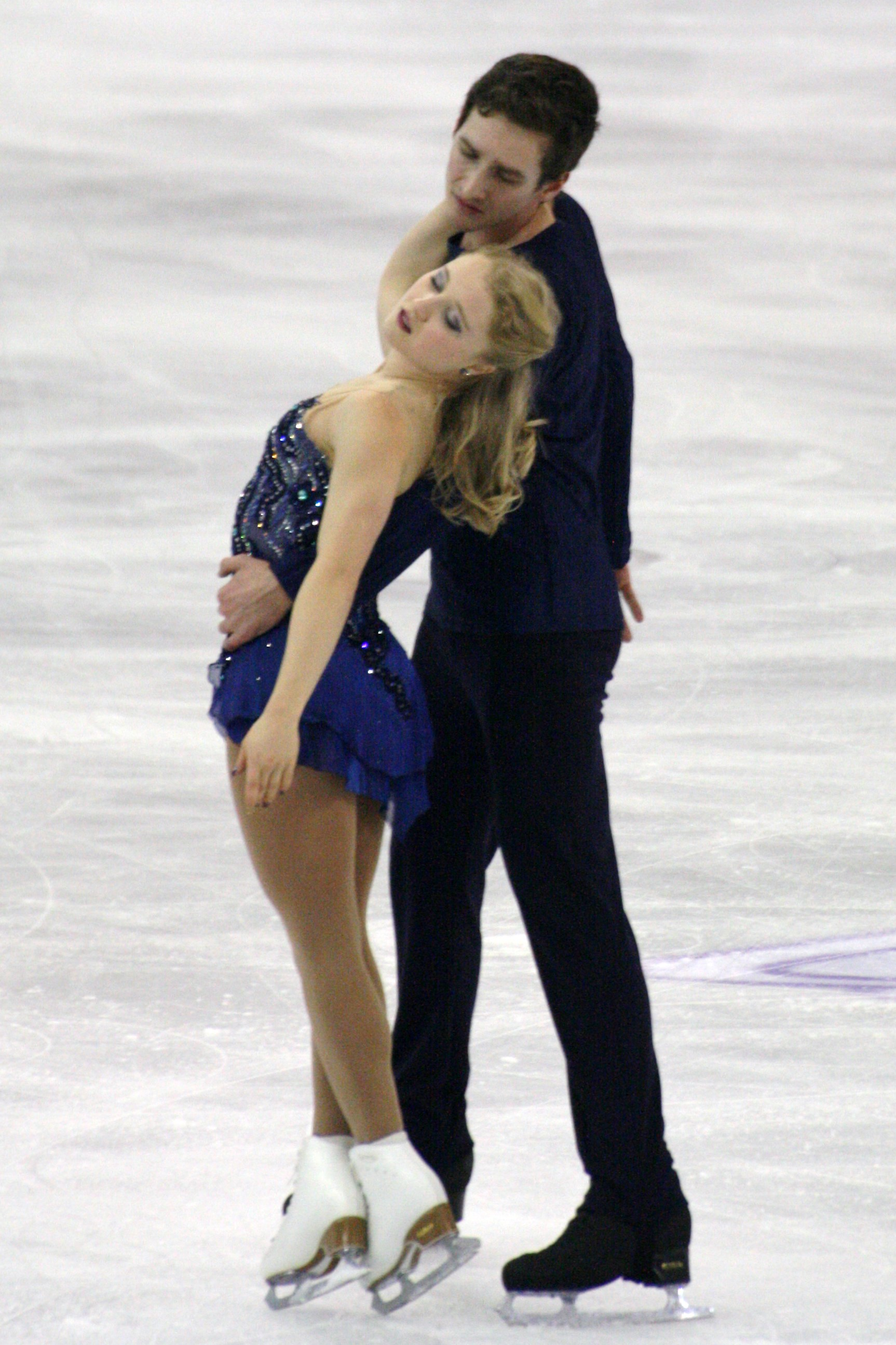
- Séguin and Bilodeau at the 2015–16 Grand Prix Final

Personal information
- Born: November 7, 1996 (age 29) Montreal, Quebec, Canada
- Home town: Longueuil, Quebec
- Height: 1.56 m (5 ft 1 in)

Figure skating career
- Country: Canada
- Coach: Josée Picard, Marc-André Craig, Valerie Saurette
- Skating club: CPA Longueuil
- Began skating: 2002
- Retired: 2018
Medal record
Representing Canada
Figure skating: Pairs
World Junior Championships
Silver medal – second place	2015 Tallinn	Pairs
Junior Grand Prix Final
Gold medal – first place	2014–15 Barcelona	Pairs

Julianne Séguin (born November 7, 1996) is a Canadian pair skater. With Charlie Bilodeau, she is the 2016 Skate America champion, the 2015 World Junior silver medallist, the 2014 Junior Grand Prix Final champion, and a three-time Canadian national medallist. The pair represented Canada at the 2018 Winter Olympics, finishing 9th.

== Personal life ==
Julianne Séguin was born on November 7, 1996, in Montreal, Quebec, Canada. She studied at a Boucherville high school in a Sports-études program. She speaks French and English.

== Skating career ==
=== Single skating ===
Séguin began learning to skate when she was five or six years old.

As a single skater, Séguin won the junior bronze medal at the 2012 Canadian Championships and began competing on the ISU Junior Grand Prix series in autumn 2012. After placing sixth on the senior level at the 2013 Canadians, she was assigned to the 2013 Four Continents Championships and finished 11th in her senior international debut.

Séguin was assigned to represent Canada in ladies' singles at the 2014 World Junior Championships. She withdrew after sustaining a back injury in practice. The following season, she won the bronze medal at an ISU Challenger Series event, the 2014 Skate Canada Autumn Classic.

=== Beginning of pair skating career ===
Séguin began competing as a pairs skater with Andrew Evans around 2011. In January 2012, they competed on the senior level at the Canadian Championships and placed ninth.

Séguin teamed up with Charlie Bilodeau in November 2012.

=== 2013–2014 season ===
Séguin/Bilodeau debuted internationally in autumn 2013. Competing in the 2013–14 ISU Junior Grand Prix series, they placed fourth in the Czech Republic and fifth in Belarus. They won the junior silver medal at the 2014 Canadian Championships and were assigned to represent Canada at the 2014 World Junior Championships. The pair withdrew due to Séguin's back injury.

=== 2014–2015 season ===
During the 2014 JGP series, Séguin/Bilodeau outscored Russia's Lina Fedorova / Maxim Miroshkin for the gold medal in Ostrava, Czech Republic. Upon winning another gold in Dresden, Germany, the pair qualified for the JGP Final. At the latter event, held in December 2014 in Barcelona, they placed first in both segments and won the gold medal by a margin of 9.79 points over Fedorova/Miroshkin.

In January 2015, Séguin/Bilodeau took the senior bronze medal at the Canadian Championships and were named in Canada's teams to the junior and senior World Championships. In February, they were awarded the silver medal at Junior Worlds in Tallinn, Estonia, having placed second to China's Yu Xiaoyu / Jin Yang. In March, they ranked tenth in both segments and finished eighth overall at the World Championships in Shanghai, China.

=== 2015–2016 season ===
Séguin/Bilodeau won silver at the 2016 Canadian Nationals. While practicing a throw jump in early February, she injured her ankle, resulting in torn ligaments and a bone contusion which would take two to three months to heal. The pair withdrew from the 2016 Four Continents. They later withdrew from 2016 Worlds as well, stating that the injury was not fully healed and they had missed many practices.

=== 2016–2017 season ===
Séguin/Bilodeau won the 2016 CS Autumn Classic International and 2016 Skate America. They finished 5th at the 2016 Rostelecom Cup and 2016–17 Grand Prix Final. Séguin sustained a concussion on December 24, 2016, and did not resume training until February 1, 2017. As a result, the pair withdrew from the 2017 Canadian Championships. They placed 11th at the 2017 World Championships in Helsinki, Finland.

Séguin sustained two further concussions – the second occurred at an ice show in April and the third while practicing a lift in July 2017. Bilodeau underwent a knee operation in June 2017.

=== 2017–2018 season ===
Séguin/Bilodeau began their season with bronze at the 2017 CS Autumn Classic International. Their Grand Prix results – 5th at the 2017 Rostelecom Cup and 4th at the 2017 NHK Trophy – were insufficient to qualify to the Grand Prix Final. At the Rostelecom Cup, Séguin experienced blurred vision, dizziness, and nausea. Her concussion-related symptoms continued until December and in a later interview she said that, with the Olympics approaching, she took risks that she would not normally have taken.

In January, Séguin/Bilodeau won the silver medal at the 2018 Canadian Championships, having placed second in both segments, and were nominated to represent Canada at the Olympics. The two placed 12th in the short, 8th in the free, and 9th overall at the 2018 Winter Olympics, which took place in February in Pyeongchang, South Korea. The pair had less success at the 2018 World Championships in Milan, Italy. Ranked 22nd in the short program, they would not qualify to the free skate.

=== Retirement ===
Séguin/Bilodeau were invited to the 2018 Grand Prix of Helsinki and 2018 Internationaux de France. They planned to use "Groove Is in the Heart" by Deee-Lite for the short program and "Wicked Game" by Theory of a Deadman for the free skate. However, in mid-July 2018, Bilodeau decided to dissolve their partnership.

In December 2018, Séguin said that she had returned to the ice a couple of weeks earlier, following a pause during which she questioned her future in skating. She stated that her aim was to be prepared for tryouts in January. However, ongoing health issues made this impossible, and Séguin retired from competition. Interviewed in 2021, she was still suffering from long-term effects of her series of concussions in 2017, which had been exacerbated by not following federation guidelines for safe return to the ice following injuries. She considered that Bilodeau's ending of their partnership may have inadvertently saved her life.

== Programs ==
=== With Bilodeau ===
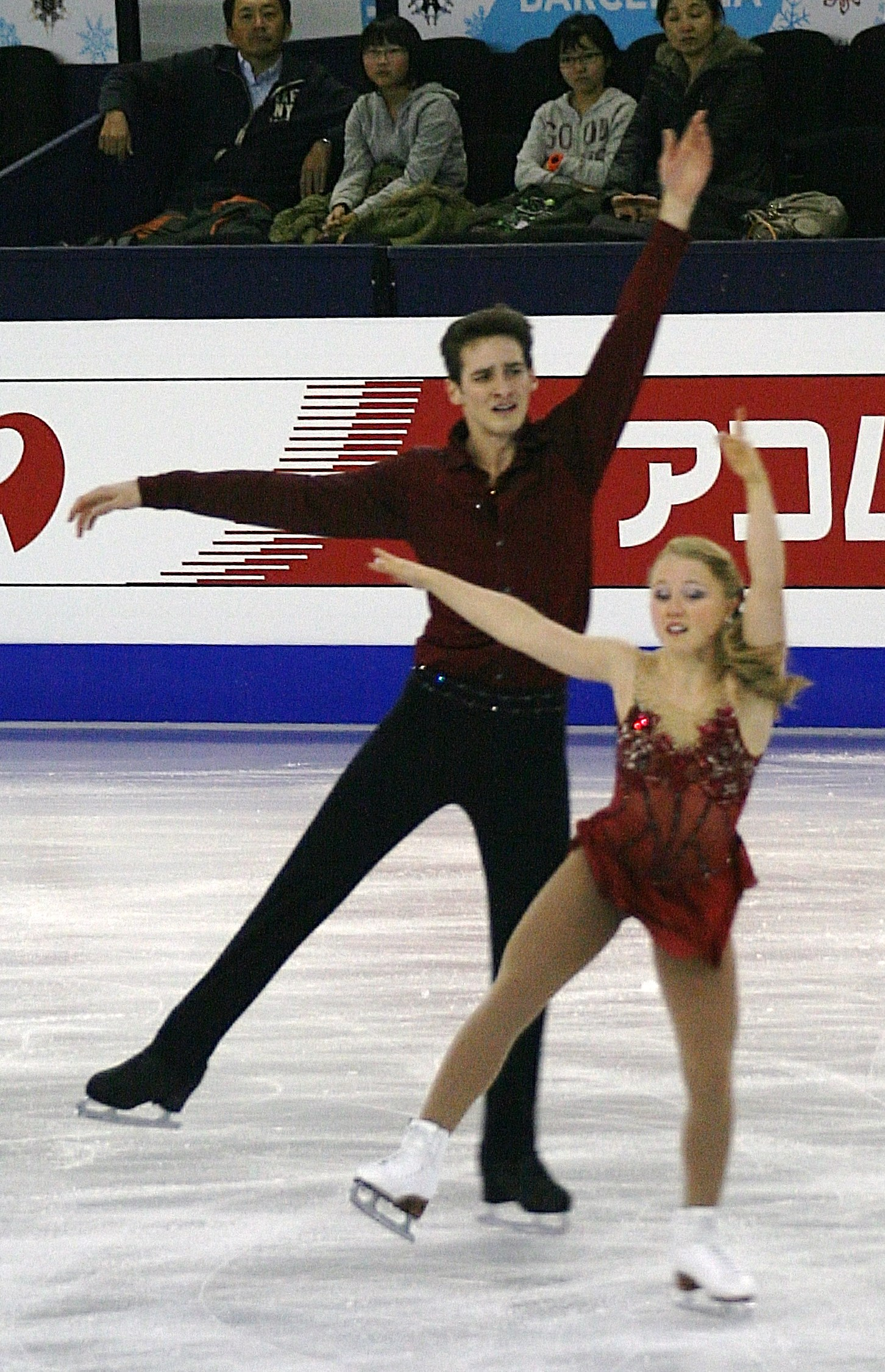
Séguin/Bilodeau at the 2014–15 Junior Grand Prix Final

Season	Short program	Free skating	Exhibition
2017–2018	Everybody Wants to Rule the World by Roland Orzabal, Ian Stanley, Chris Hughes performed by Lorde	Where's My Love by SYML	Charley, My Boy
2016–2017	Monde Inversé (from Kurios) by Raphaël Beau, Guy Dubuc, Marc Lessard; Skokiaan by Louis Armstrong	Cinema Paradiso by Ennio Morricone, Andrea Morricone choreo. by Marie-France Dubreuil, David Wilson	Shut Up and Dance by Walk the Moon
2015–2016	Monde Inversé (from Kurios) by Raphaël Beau, Guy Dubuc, Marc Lessard choreo. by Shae-Lynn Bourne, Shae Zukiwsky	A Whiter Shade of Pale by Procol Harum performed with The Danish National Concert Orchestra and Choir choreo. by Marie-France Dubreuil, Patrice Lauzon	Shut Up and Dance by Walk the Moon; If You've Only Got A Mustache by Stephen Foster
2014–2015	The Grand Budapest Hotel; s'Rothe-Zäuerli by Öse Schuppel; The Family Desgoffe und Taxis by Alexandre Desplat choreo. by Shae Zukiwsky	In Your Eyes; Wallflower by Peter Gabriel choreo. by Marie-France Dubreuil, Patrice Lauzon	Fly Me to the Moon by Frank Sinatra; If You've Only Got A Mustache by Stephen Foster
2013–2014	Do You Only Wanna Dance (from Dirty Dancing: Havana Nights)	James Bond by John Barry: Oddjob's Pressing Engagement (from Goldfinger); On Her Majesty's Secret Service; Alpine Drive Auric's Factory; Into Miami (from Goldfinger)	

=== Single skating ===
Season	Short program	Free skating
2014–2015	Gypsy Tango; Tanguera (Tango Argentino)	Aria and 30 Variations (The Goldberg Variations); Heart of Stone; Sonata No. 14 in E sharp minor for Piano op. 27, No. 2 "Moonlight" by Ludwig van Beethoven
2013–2014	Jinsei no merry go round (from Freedom Piano Stories 4) by Joe Hisaishi	Gigi; Over the Rainbow; The Parisians
2012–2013	Fever; Sing, Sing, Sing	Rhapsody in Blue by George Gershwin

== Competitive highlights ==
GP: Grand Prix; CS: Challenger Series; JGP: Junior Grand Prix

=== Pairs with Bilodeau ===
International
Event	13–14	14–15	15–16	16–17	17–18
Olympics					9th
Worlds		8th	WD	11th	22nd
Four Continents			WD		
GP Final			4th	5th	
GP Finland					
GP France			3rd		
GP NHK Trophy					4th
GP Rostelecom Cup				5th	5th
GP Skate America			3rd	1st	
CS Autumn Classic				1st	3rd
CS Nebelhorn			5th		
International: Junior
Junior Worlds	WD	2nd			
JGP Final		1st			
JGP Belarus	4th				
JGP Czech Republic	4th	1st			
JGP Germany		1st			
National
Canadian Champ.	2nd J	3rd	2nd	WD	2nd

=== Pairs with Evans ===
National
Event	2011–12
Canadian Championships	9th

=== Single skating ===
International
Event	11–12	12–13	13–14	14–15
Four Continents		11th		
GP Skate Canada				12th
CS Autumn Classic				3rd
International: Junior
Junior Worlds			WD	
JGP Czech Republic			9th	
JGP France		7th		
JGP Mexico			6th	
JGP Slovenia		10th		
National
Canadian Champ.	3rd J	6th	7th	
