= Yi Christy Leung =

Hong Kong figure skater

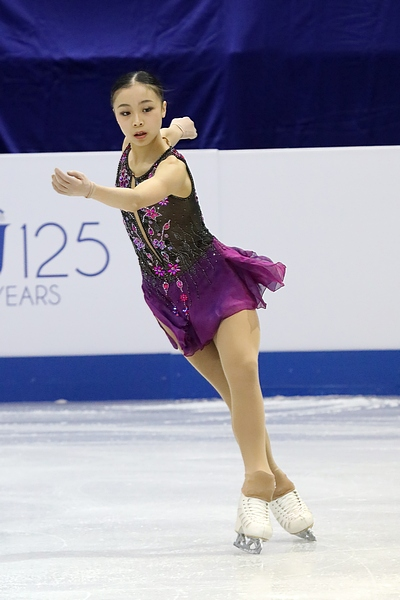
- Leung at 2017 Junior Worlds

Personal information
- Native name: 梁懿
- Other names: Liang Yi
- Born: December 12, 2002 (age 23) Hong Kong
- Height: 1.70 m (5 ft 7 in)

Figure skating career
- Country: Hong Kong
- Coach: Tammy Gambill
- Skating club: Hong Kong Skating Union
- Began skating: 2009

Yi Christy Leung, also known as Liang Yi, (Chinese: 梁懿; born December 12, 2002) is a Hong Kong figure skater. She has finished within the top twelve at three ISU Championships. She is the 2019 Chinese national champion.

== Career ==
=== Early years ===
Leung began learning to skate in 2009. In the 2015–2016 season, she placed fourth in the senior ranks at the 2016 Chinese Championships but was ineligible for senior and junior internationals due to her age.

=== 2016–2017 season ===
Making her junior international debut, Leung placed fifth at the Asian Open Trophy in August 2016 and tenth at an October Junior Grand Prix event in Dresden, Germany. In March, she ranked eighth in the short program, tenth in the free skate, and ninth overall at the 2017 World Junior Championships in Taipei. She became the first Hong Kong skater to finish in the top ten at an ISU Championship. Her result allowed Hong Kong to send two ladies' single skaters to the 2018 edition.

=== 2017–2018 season ===
Leung finished eleventh at the 2018 World Junior Championships in Sofia, Bulgaria.

=== 2018–2019 season ===
In her senior international debut, Leung finished fourth at the 2018 CS Asian Open Figure Skating Trophy in Bangkok, Thailand in August 2018. She finished fourth at the 2019 JGP Slovakia in Bratislava, Slovakia in August 2018, where she achieved her personal best short program score of 61.96 and personal best total score of 177.22. She next made her Challenger series debut at the 2018 CS U.S. International Figure Skating Classic, where Leung also ranked fourth. At the 2018 JGP Slovenia in October 2018, Leung ranked seventh. She finished sixth at the 2018 CS Tallinn Trophy, her second Challenger event of the year. In December 2018, Leung won the gold medal at the Chinese Figure Skating Championships.

Leung ranked twelfth at the 2019 Four Continents Figure Skating Championships and twenty-first in the 2019 World Junior Championships. At the 2019 World Championships in March 2019, she ranked fourteenth in the short program with a score of 58.60 and fourteenth in the free skate with a score of 118.62, to finish fourteenth overall with a repeat of her personal best total score of 177.22.

=== 2019–2020 season ===
Leung began the season at the 2019 Shanghai Trophy, where she finished fourth. Leung was invited to make her senior Grand Prix debut at the 2019 Skate America, replacing an injured Elizabet Tursynbaeva, and was also named as one of China's selections for the 2019 Cup of China. She placed ninth at Skate America and eighth at the Cup of China.

After withdrawing from the Four Continents Championships, Leung was assigned to compete at the World Championships in Montreal, but these were cancelled as a result of the coronavirus pandemic.

=== 2020–2021 season ===
Leung was scheduled to compete for the only time in the pandemic-constrained season at the 2021 World Championships in Stockholm, the first of two qualifiers for the 2022 Winter Olympics in Beijing. On arrival, however, she twisted her foot in a practice session and was forced to withdraw.

== Programs ==
Season	Short program	Free skating
2020–2022	Black Swan by Clint Mansell choreo. by Ilona Melnichenko	Breath of Life by Florence and the Machine choreo. by Shae-Lynn Bourne
2019–2020	Whatever Lola Wants (from Damn Yankees) by Richard Adler, Jerry Ross performed by Sarah Vaughan choreo. by Shae-Lynn Bourne	Cirque du Soleil; Réveil; Seisouso; Réveil by Benoît Jutras choreo. by Tom Dickson
2018–2019	Scène d'amour by Francis Lai performed by Sarah Brightman choreo. by Rohene Ward	Breath of Life by Florence and the Machine choreo. by Shae-Lynn Bourne
2017–2018	California Dreamin' (from San Andreas) performed by Sia	Romantic Revenge by Michał Jelonek
2016–2017	Hana's Eyes by Maksim Mrvica	Romantic Revenge by Michał Jelonek

== Competitive highlights ==
GP: Grand Prix; CS: Challenger Series; JGP: Junior Grand Prix

International
Event	14–15	15–16	16–17	17–18	18–19	19–20	20–21	21–22
Worlds					14th	C	WD	
Four Continents					12th	WD		
GP Cup of China						8th		
GP Skate America						9th		
CS Asian Open					4th	5th		
CS Tallinn Trophy					6th			
CS U.S. Classic					4th			
Shanghai Trophy						4th		
U.S. Classic								WD
International: Junior
Junior Worlds			9th	11th	21st			
JGP Australia				14th				
JGP Germany			10th					
JGP Slovakia					4th			
JGP Slovenia					7th			
Asian Open			5th	6th				
Cup of Nice			2nd					
National
Hong Kong		1st J	1st J					
Chinese Champ.	6th	4th	5th		1st			
TBD = Assigned; WD = Withdrew; C = Cancelled; Levels: J = Junior

== Detailed results ==
=== Senior ===
2019–20 season
Date	Event	SP	FS	Total
November 8–10, 2019	2019 Cup of China	8; 53.90	9; 103.57	8; 157.47
Oct. 30 – Nov. 3, 2019	2019 CS Asian Open	4; 58.34	6; 93.11	5; 151.45
October 18–20, 2019	2019 Skate America	10; 54.25	7; 109.43	9; 163.68
October 3–5, 2019	2019 Shanghai Trophy	5; 52.47	4; 100.73	4; 153.20

=== Junior ===
2018–19 season
Date	Event	Level	SP	FS	Total
March 18–24, 2019	2019 World Championships	Senior	14; 58.60	14; 118.62	14; 177.22
March 4–10, 2019	2019 World Junior Championships	Junior	22; 47.62	20; 88.23	21; 135.85
February 7–10, 2019	2019 Four Continents Championships	Senior	15; 53.93	11; 110.86	12; 164.79
December 27–30, 2018	2019 Chinese Nationals	Senior	2; 65.93	1; 124.24	1; 190.17
November 26 – December 2, 2018	2018 CS Tallinn Trophy	Senior	5; 56.70	6; 115.25	6; 171.95
October 3–6, 2018	2018 JGP Slovenia	Junior	7; 50.16	5; 109.25	7; 159.41
September 12–16, 2018	2018 CS U.S. International Classic	Senior	5; 58.10	3; 115.73	4; 173.83
August 22–25, 2018	2018 JGP Slovakia	Junior	4; 61.96	5; 115.26	4; 177.22
August 1–5, 2018	2018 CS Asian Open	Senior	3; 57.99	4; 103.02	4; 161.01
2017–18 season
Date	Event	Level	SP	FS	Total
March 5–11, 2018	2018 World Junior Championship	Junior	11; 56.97	13; 99.25	11; 156.22
August 23–26, 2017	2018 Junior Grand Prix, Australia	Junior	12; 38.81	15; 69.07	14; 107.88
August 2–5, 2017	2017 Asian Open Trophy	Junior	6; 42.88	6; 89.25	6; 132.13
