= 2018 Grand Prix of Helsinki =

Figure skating competition

- Type: Grand Prix
- Date: November 2 – 4
- Season: 2018–19
- Location: Helsinki, Finland

Champions
- Men's singles: (Japan) Yuzuru Hanyu
- Ladies' singles: (Russia) Alina Zagitova
- Pairs: (Russia) Natalia Zabiiako / Alexander Enbert
- Ice dance: (Russia) Alexandra Stepanova / Ivan Bukin
- Next: 2022 Grand Prix of Espoo
- Previous Grand Prix: 2018 Skate Canada International
- Next Grand Prix: 2018 NHK Trophy

The 2018 Grand Prix of Helsinki was held in Helsinki, Finland, from November 2–4. It was the third event of the 2018–19 ISU Grand Prix of Figure Skating, a senior-level international invitational competition series. Finland was chosen as the host after the Chinese Skating Association declined to host their annual Grand Prix event, the Cup of China. Medals were awarded in the disciplines of men's singles, ladies' singles, pair skating, and ice dancing. Skaters competed to earn points toward qualifying for the 2018–19 Grand Prix Final. Over 20,000 tickets were sold.

== Entries ==
The ISU published the preliminary assignments on June 29, 2018.

Country	Men	Ladies	Pairs	Ice dancing
Austria			Miriam Ziegler / Severin Kiefer	
Belgium		Loena Hendrickx		
China	Jin Boyang			
Czech Republic	Michal Březina			
North Korea			Ryom Tae-ok / Kim Ju-sik	
Finland	Valtter Virtanen	Viveca Lindfors; Emmi Peltonen		Juulia Turkkila / Matthias Versluis
Germany				Shari Koch / Christian Nüchtern; Katharina Müller / Tim Dieck
Israel	Alexei Bychenko			
Italy			Nicole Della Monica / Matteo Guarise	Charlène Guignard / Marco Fabbri; Jasmine Tessari / Francesco Fioretti
Japan	Yuzuru Hanyu; Keiji Tanaka	Rika Hongo; Kaori Sakamoto; Yuna Shiraiwa	Miu Suzaki / Ryuichi Kihara	
Russia	Mikhail Kolyada; Andrei Lazukin	Stanislava Konstantinova; Daria Panenkova; Alina Zagitova	Daria Pavliuchenko / Denis Khodykin; Natalia Zabiiako / Alexander Enbert	Betina Popova / Sergey Mozgov; Alexandra Stepanova / Ivan Bukin
South Korea	Cha Jun-hwan	Kim Ha-nul		
Spain			Laura Barquero / Aritz Maestu	Sara Hurtado / Kirill Khaliavin
United Kingdom	Phillip Harris			
United States	Alexei Krasnozhon	Angela Wang	Deanna Stellato / Nathan Bartholomay	Christina Carreira / Anthony Ponomarenko; Lorraine McNamara / Quinn Carpenter

=== Changes to preliminary assignments ===
Date	Discipline	Withdrew	Added	Reason/Other notes	Refs
July 19 and August 10	Pairs	(Canada) Julianne Séguin / Charlie Bilodeau	(Japan) Miu Suzaki / Ryuichi Kihara	Split	
July 30 and August 9	Pairs	(China) Sui Wenjing / Han Cong	(China) Li Xiangning / Xie Zhong	Injury recovery (Sui)	
August 6	Pairs	—	(United States) Deanna Stellato / Nathan Bartholomay	Host picks	
August 9 and 26	Ladies	(Slovakia) Nicole Rajičová	(Finland) Viveca Lindfors	Host picks	
August 15 and 16	Ice dance	(Czech Republic) Cortney Mansour / Michal Češka	(Germany) Shari Koch / Christian Nüchtern		
August 15 and 31	Men	(Belgium) Jorik Hendrickx	(South Korea) Cha Jun-hwan		
August 25	Men	—	(Finland) Valtter Virtanen	Host picks	
August 28	Ice dance	—	(Finland) Juulia Turkkila / Matthias Versluis	Host picks	
September 21	Ladies	—	(Finland) Emmi Peltonen	Host picks	
September 21	Ice dance	(Finland) Cecilia Törn / Jussiville Partanen	(Italy) Jasmine Tessari / Francesco Fioretti	Host picks	
October 8 and 9	Pairs	(China) Li Xiangning / Xie Zhong	(Spain) Laura Barquero / Aritz Maestu		
October 15 and 16	Ladies	(United States) Karen Chen	(United States) Angela Wang	Injury recovery	
October 16 and 18	Ice dance	(United States) Madison Chock / Evan Bates	(Germany) Katharina Müller / Tim Dieck	Injury recovery (Chock)	
October 20 and 23	Ladies	(Italy) Carolina Kostner	(South Korea) Kim Ha-nul	Hip injury	
October 29	Men	(Russia) Alexey Erokhov	—		
October 29	Ladies	(Germany) Nicole Schott	—		

== Records ==
The following new ISU best scores were set during this competition:

Event	Component	Skater(s)	Score	Date	Ref
Men	Short program	(Japan) Yuzuru Hanyu	106.69	November 3, 2018	
Men	Free skating	(Japan) Yuzuru Hanyu	190.43	4 November 2018	
Men	Total score	(Japan) Yuzuru Hanyu	297.12	4 November 2018	

== Results ==
=== Men ===
Rank	Name	Nation	Total points	SP		FS	
1	Yuzuru Hanyu	Japan	297.12	1	106.69	1	190.43
2	Michal Březina	Czech Republic	257.98	2	93.31	2	164.67
3	Cha Jun-hwan	South Korea	243.19	4	82.82	3	160.37
4	Mikhail Kolyada	Russia	238.79	6	81.76	4	157.03
5	Jin Boyang	China	227.28	3	85.97	5	141.31
6	Andrei Lazukin	Russia	218.22	5	82.54	7	135.68
7	Alexei Krasnozhon	United States	211.03	8	74.05	6	136.98
8	Keiji Tanaka	Japan	206.82	7	80.60	9	126.22
9	Alexei Bychenko	Israel	202.33	9	73.44	8	128.89
10	Phillip Harris	United Kingdom	182.66	10	58.99	10	123.67
11	Valtter Virtanen	Finland	154.74	11	48.16	11	106.58

=== Ladies ===
Rank	Name	Nation	Total points	SP		FS	
1	Alina Zagitova	Russia	215.29	1	68.90	1	146.39
2	Stanislava Konstantinova	Russia	197.57	4	62.56	3	135.01
3	Kaori Sakamoto	Japan	197.42	7	57.26	2	140.16
4	Yuna Shiraiwa	Japan	191.46	2	63.77	5	127.69
5	Loena Hendrickx	Belgium	191.22	3	63.17	4	128.05
6	Daria Panenkova	Russia	161.48	6	58.23	9	103.25
7	Kim Ha-nul	South Korea	160.15	8	55.38	8	104.77
8	Viveca Lindfors	Finland	159.62	10	52.95	6	106.67
9	Emmi Peltonen	Finland	158.72	5	59.90	10	98.82
10	Rika Hongo	Japan	156.59	11	51.11	7	105.48
11	Angela Wang	United States	149.57	9	53.76	11	95.81

=== Pairs ===
Rank	Name	Nation	Total points	SP		FS	
1	Natalia Zabiiako / Alexander Enbert	Russia	198.51	2	67.59	1	130.92
2	Nicole Della Monica / Matteo Guarise	Italy	185.77	1	68.18	3	117.59
3	Daria Pavliuchenko / Denis Khodykin	Russia	185.61	3	63.80	2	121.81
4	Miriam Ziegler / Severin Kiefer	Austria	174.81	4	62.69	5	112.12
5	Ryom Tae-ok / Kim Ju-sik	North Korea	174.24	5	56.87	4	117.37
6	Deanna Stellato-Dudek / Nathan Bartholomay	United States	159.21	6	56.44	6	102.77
7	Laura Barquero / Aritz Maestu	Spain	149.54	7	50.91	8	98.63
8	Miu Suzaki / Ryuichi Kihara	Japan	145.65	8	46.22	7	99.43

=== Ice dancing ===
Rank	Name	Nation	Total points	RD		FD	
1	Alexandra Stepanova / Ivan Bukin	Russia	200.09	1	78.18	1	121.91
2	Charlène Guignard / Marco Fabbri	Italy	196.29	2	77.36	2	118.93
3	Lorraine McNamara / Quinn Carpenter	United States	176.66	3	71.40	4	105.26
4	Sara Hurtado / Kirill Khaliavin	Spain	172.09	5	66.25	3	105.84
5	Christina Carreira / Anthony Ponomarenko	United States	167.28	4	66.93	5	100.35
6	Juulia Turkkila / Matthias Versluis	Finland	160.62	6	63.06	6	97.56
7	Betina Popova / Sergey Mozgov	Russia	157.56	7	62.35	8	95.21
8	Jasmine Tessari / Francesco Fioretti	Italy	153.89	8	58.48	7	95.41
9	Shari Koch / Christian Nüchtern	Germany	143.62	9	56.71	10	86.91
10	Katharina Müller / Tim Dieck	Germany	143.59	10	56.59	9	87.00
