= Kim Ju-sik =

North Korean pair skater (born 1992)

Kim Ju Sik
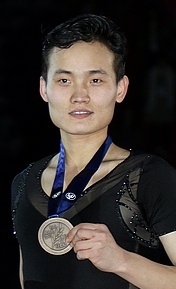
- Kim on the podium at the 2018 Four Continents Championships.

Personal information
- Born: September 25, 1992 (age 34) Pyongyang, North Korea
- Height: 1.74 m (5 ft 9 in)

Figure skating career
- Country: North Korea
- Partner: Ryom Tae-ok (2015–2021); Kang Kyong-mi (2012–2014)
- Coach: Kim Hyon-son
- Skating club: Taesongsan SC
- Began skating: 2001
- Retired: 2021
Medal record
Representing North Korea
Figure skating: Pairs
Four Continents Championships
Bronze medal – third place	2018 Taipei	Pairs
Asian Winter Games
Bronze medal – third place	2017 Almaty	Pairs

- Kim Ju-sik
- Hangul: 김주식
- Hanja: 金柱植
- RR: Gim Jusik
- MR: Kim Chusik

Kim Ju Sik (Korean: 김주식; born September 25, 1992) is a retired North Korean pair skater. With his former partner, Ryom Tae-ok, he is the 2018 Four Continents bronze medalist, the 2017 Asian Winter Games bronze medalist, 2016 Cup of Tyrol bronze medalist, and 2016 Asian Open Trophy champion. Ryom and Kim were the first North Korean figure skaters to win a medal at an ISU event.

== Personal life ==
Kim was born on September 25, 1992 in Pyongyang, North Korea. Following his retirement from competitive figure skating, he began working as a figure skating coach.

As of 2024, he is married and has a son.

== Career ==
=== Early career ===
Kim began figure skating in 2001 at the age of nine after visiting the Pyongyang Ice Rink with his father. He originally competed as a singles skater before switching to pair skating when teamed up with Kang Kyong-mi in 2012. Together, they competed on the 2012–13 ISU Junior Grand Prix circuit, finishing tenth at 2012 JGP Germany. Their partnership would dissolve following the 2013–14 figure skating season and Kim would eventually team up with Ryom Tae-ok in 2015.

==== 2015–2016 season: Debut of Ryom/Kim ====
Ryom/Kim made their international debut in October 2015 at the 2015 CS Ice Challenge, where they placed fifth. The pair would later go on to place seventh at the 2016 Four Continents in Taipei, Taiwan, before ending the season with the bronze medal at the 2016 Cup of Tyrol.

Following the season, the pair established a working relationship with Canadian figure skating choreographer, Julie Marcotte.

==== 2016–2017 season ====
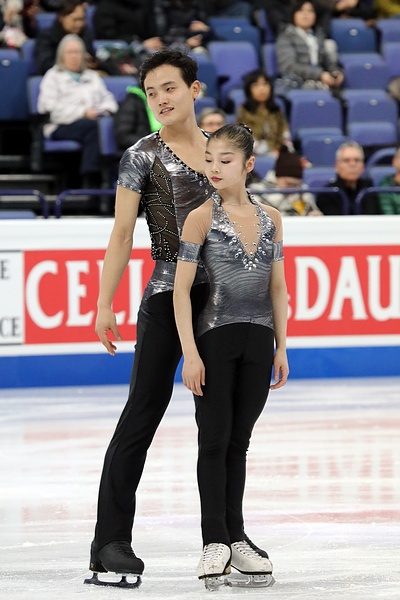
Ryom and Kim at the 2017 World Championships.

The pair started the season by taking gold at the 2016 Asian Open Trophy and at the 2016 Merano Cup. Additionally, they won their first national title at the 2017 North Korean Championships.

In February, the pair would take the bronze medal at the 2017 Asian Winter Games. One month later, they made their World Championship debut at the 2017 World Championships in Helsinki, Finland, where they would finish fifteenth.

==== 2017–2018 season: Four Continents bronze medal and 2018 PyeongChang Winter Olympics ====
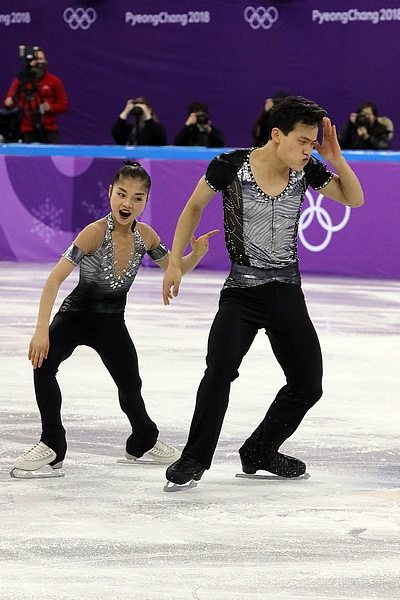
Ryom and Kim during their short program at the 2018 Winter Olympics.

During the off-season and in anticipation for the upcoming 2018 Winter Olympics, Ryom/Kim, their coach, and a member of the North Korean Figure Skating Federation traveled to Montreal, Quebec, Canada from June to August to work with Canadian pair skating coach, Bruno Marcotte. Looking back on his time training them, Marcotte remarked, "I had to make all the arrangements for them, because I mean, they don't have a credit card. So they cannot just book a hotel. They do not have [a] driver's licence, so I could not just find a place anywhere in Montreal... They were often all of them together, but they were not constantly watched or surveyed, no. They spoke to everybody. I mean, they got really integrated, they integrated themselves really well with all the other kids... Every time I spoke to them, they always made sure that they never wanted me to feel and confuse politics with sport. And they always wanted to make sure that I saw them as sportsmen and not as political representatives. I think they want to be pioneers."

Ryom/Kim started their season by competing at the 2017 CS Nebelhorn Trophy, which served as the final qualification event for the 2018 Winter Olympics. The top five pair skating teams that had not already qualified berths for the Winter Olympics at the 2017 World Championships would have a chance to earn a spot for their country. At the event, Ryom/Kim would place sixth out of the sixteen pair teams that competed and third out of the five pair teams that had yet to earn a berth for the Winter Olympics. Thus their result qualified North Korea to send a pair team to the Winter Olympics.

The possibility of the team's participation at the 2018 Winter Olympics in Pyeongchang, South Korea, garnered widespread attention from media outlets due to the historical tensions between the two countries and North Korea having previously boycotted 1988 Summer Olympics in Seoul, South Korea. The country also hadn't sent any athletes to compete at the Winter Olympics in Sochi, Russia. Despite this, South Korean officials stated that they were organizing the event with the belief that North Korea would participate. In addition, Anita DeFrantz, a member of the International Olympic Committee (IOC) stated, "We hope [North Korea competes]. I hope there's no reason for them not to. I know we're doing everything we can to insure that there is no barrier."

Although the Olympic Committee of the Democratic People's Republic of Korea would miss the deadline to register the team to compete at the Olympic games, it was announced in early January 2018, that the IOC extended an invitation to Ryom/Kim to compete in the Olympic pairs event as wild cards.

Ryom/Kim went on to compete at the North Korean Championships, which they won for a second time. At the 2018 Four Continents Championships at the end of January, Ryom/Kim took the bronze medal.

During the pairs event at the 2018 Winter Olympics in mid-February, a North Korean cheerleading squad attended the event to cheer for Ryom/Kim, chanting their names and waving North Korean flags. Ryom/Kim managed to skate a clean short program to A Day in the Life by The Beatles and immediately became crowd favorites of the South Korean audience. They would place eleventh in that segment of the competition, thus qualifying for the free skate segment. Their short program song selection also attracted international attention due to North Korea's history of music censorship. During the free skate segment, the pair once again delivered a clean program, to the crowd's delight. The pair would place twelfth in the free skate and finish the competition in thirteenth place overall. Moved by the team's performances, South Korean spectator, Lee Sae-rom said, "This may be the last time I see North Koreans compete at an Olympics in South Korea. My daughter is so young that she does not even know that the two Koreas are divided, but I hope she feels that they should be reunited through sport." The team were later invited to skate in the gala exhibition.

One month later, at the 2018 World Championships in Milan, Italy, the pair came in twelfth place.

==== 2018–2019 season ====
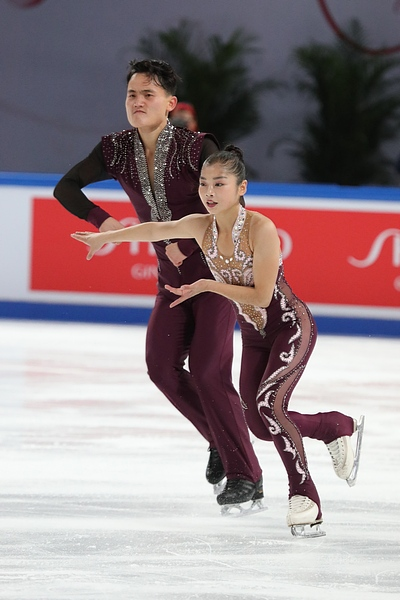
Ryom and Kim at the 2019 Cup of China.

Ryom/Kim began the season by winning silver at the 2018 CS Asian Open Figure Skating Trophy. They went on to debut on the Grand Prix circuit, placing fifth at the 2018 Grand Prix of Helsinki and fourth at the 2018 Internationaux de France. They also won the third national title at the 2019 North Korean Championships.

At the 2019 World Championships in Saitama, Japan, Ryom/Kim finished eleventh.

==== 2019–2020 season ====
Due to Kim getting plagued with injuries, Ryom/Kim only competed at two international events, 2019 CS Nebelhorn Trophy and the 2019 Cup of China, where they finished third and fourth, respectively. The pair would also go on to win their fourth consecutive national title at the 2020 North Korean Championships.

==== 2020–2021 seasons: End of Ryom/Kim ====
Ryom/Kim only competed at the 2021 North Korean Championships where they won their fifth national title.

Their partnership would later dissolve due to Kim choosing to retire from competitive figure skating.

== Programs ==
=== With Ryom ===
Season	Short program	Free skating	Exhibition
2019–2020	We Will Never Forget by Om Ha Jin performed by the National Symphonic Orchestra choreo. by Julie Marcotte; Malagueña by Ernesto Lecuona choreo. by Julie Marcotte	Fly High, Doves by Choe Hong Nam choreo. by Julie Marcotte	
2018–2019	A Day in the Life by The Beatles performed by Jeff Beck choreo. by Julie Marcotte	Je suis qu'une chanson by Diane Justler, performed by Ginette Reno choreo. by Julie Marcotte	Gobaek by Hwang Jun Yong
2017–2018	A Day in the Life by The Beatles performed by Jeff Beck choreo. by Julie Marcotte	Je suis qu'une chanson by Diane Justler, performed by Ginette Reno choreo. by Julie Marcotte	Bangabsumnida (Nice to Meet You) by Hwang Jun Yong
2016–2017	A Day in the Life by The Beatles performed by Jeff Beck choreo. by Julie Marcotte	The Prince and the Sugarplum Fairy (from The Nutcracker) by Pyotr Ilyich Tchaikovsky choreo. by Kim Hyon-son	
2015–2016	Salute to Love by Pyotr Ilyich Tchaikovsky choreo. by Kim Hyon-son	The Prince and the Sugarplum Fairy (from The Nutcracker) by Pyotr Ilyich Tchaikovsky choreo. by Kim Hyon-son	

=== With Kang ===
Season	Short program	Free skating
2012–2013	Flamenco by Didulia	The Person Who the Era Needs by Kim Jong-min

== Competitive highlights ==
GP: Grand Prix; CS: Challenger Series; JGP: Junior Grand Prix

=== Pairs with Ryom ===
International
Event	15–16	16–17	17–18	18–19	19–20	20–21
Olympics			13th			
Worlds		15th	12th	11th		
Four Continents	7th		3rd			
GP Cup of China					5th	
GP Finland				5th		
GP France				4th	WD	
CS Ice Challenge	5th					
CS Nebelhorn			6th		3rd	
Asian Games		3rd				
Asian Open		1st		2nd		
Cup of Tyrol	3rd					
National
North Korean Champ.		1st	1st	1st	1st	1st
TBD = Assigned; WD = Withdrew

=== Pairs with Kang ===
International
Event	12–13	13–14
JGP Germany	10th	
National
North Korean Champ.	3rd	4th

=== Men's singles ===
National
Event	11–12
North Korean Champ.	5th

== Detailed results ==
=== With Ryom Tae-ok ===
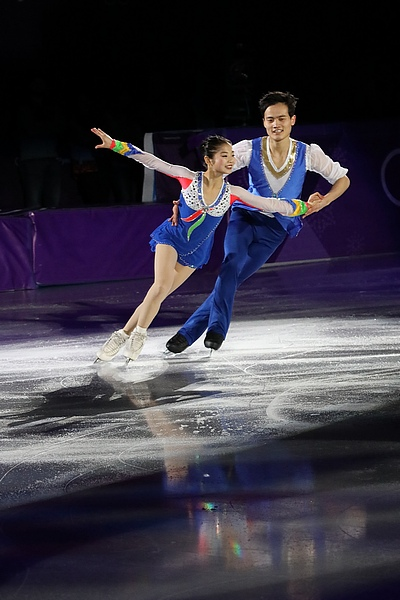
Ryom and Kim at the exhibition gala at the 2018 Winter Olympics.

Small medals for short and free programs awarded only at ISU Championships.

2019–20 season
Date	Event	SP	FS	Total
November 8–10, 2019	2019 Cup of China	8; 60.50	4; 119.05	5; 179.55
November 25–28, 2019	2019 CS Nebelhorn Trophy	4; 66.91	5; 116.61	3; 183.02
2018–19 season
Date	Event	SP	FS	Total
March 18–24, 2019	2019 World Championships	13; 58.77	10; 116.54	11; 175.31
November 23–25, 2018	2018 Internationaux de France	2; **67.18**	4; **120.77**	4; **187.95**
November 2–4, 2018	2018 Grand Prix of Helsinki	5; 56.87	4; 117.37	5; 172.24
August 1–5, 2018	2018 Asian Open Trophy	2; 60.40	2; 112.80	2; 173.20
2017–18 season
Date	Event	SP	FS	Total
March 19–25, 2018	2018 World Championships	12; 66.32	12; 122.45	12; 188.77
February 14–23, 2018	2018 Winter Olympics	11; **69.40**	12; **124.23**	13; **193.63**
January 22–28, 2018	2018 Four Continents Championships	4; 65.25	3; 119.73	3; 184.98
September 28–30, 2017	2017 CS Nebelhorn Trophy	5; 60.09	6; 119.90	6; 180.09
August 10–13, 2017	Championnats québécois d'été 2017	2; 67.38	2; 113.62	2; 181.00
2016–2017 season
Date	Event	SP	FS	Total
March 27–April 2, 2017	2017 World Championships	14; 64.52	15; 105.13	15; 169.65
February 19–26, 2017	2017 Asian Winter Games	3; 65.22	3; 112.18	3; 177.40
August 4–7, 2016	2016 Asian Open Trophy	2; 51.16	1; 92.99	1; 144.15
2015–16 season
Date	Event	SP	FS	Total
March 9–13, 2016	2016 Cup of Tyrol	3; 53.64	3; 106.39	3; 160.03
February 16–21, 2016	2016 Four Continents Championships	8; 53.83	7; 103.41	7; 157.24
October 27–31, 2015	2015 CS Ice Challenge	5; 44.16	5; 88.02	5; 132.18

- ISU Personal bests highlighted in **bold**.
