= Figure skating at the 2018 Winter Olympics – Pair skating =

Pair skating at the XXIII Olympic Winter Games
- Venue: Gangneung Ice Arena; Gangneung, South Korea
- Dates: 14–15 February 2018
- Competitors: 22 teams from 14 nations
- Winning score: 235.90 points

Medalists
1st place, gold medalist(s)		Aljona Savchenko and Bruno Massot	Germany
2nd place, silver medalist(s)		Sui Wenjing and Han Cong	China
3rd place, bronze medalist(s)		Meagan Duhamel and Eric Radford	Canada

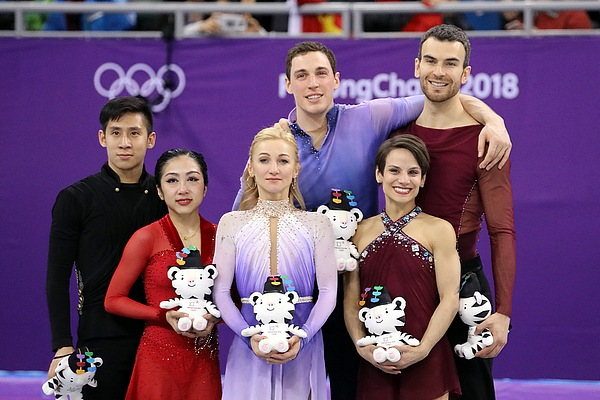
The medalists from the pairs event at the 2018 Winter Olympics (from left to right): Sui Wenjing and Han Cong of China (silver), Aljona Savchenko and Bruno Massot of Germany (gold), and Meagan Duhamel and Eric Radford of Canada (bronze)

The pairs figure skating competition at the 2018 Winter Olympics was held on 14 and 15 February 2018 at the Gangneung Ice Arena in Gangneung, South Korea, and featured 22 teams from 14 different nations. Aljona Savchenko and Bruno Massot of Germany had finished in fourth place after the short program, but rallied back in the free skate to win the gold, setting a new world record score in the process. Savchenko's fifth appearance at the Winter Olympics was a record for a pairs skater; she had already won bronze medals in both 2010 and 2014. Sui Wenjing and Han Cong of China won the silver, and Meagan Duhamel and Eric Radford of Canada won the bronze. While North Korea had originally declined to send athletes to the Olympics, after successful negotiations with South Korea, the International Olympic Committee granted an additional quota spot in pair skating for Ryom Tae-ok and Kim Ju-sik of North Korea. Controversy arose after the competition when an investigation by the International Skating Union determined that the Chinese judge in the pairs event had given preferential scores to the Chinese skaters, while simultaneously giving low scores to their strongest competitors.

== Background ==
In 2016, an independent report commissioned by the World Anti-Doping Agency confirmed allegations that the Russian Olympic team had been involved in a state-sponsored doping program from at least late 2011 through February 2014, when Russia hosted the Winter Olympics in Sochi. On 5 December 2017, the International Olympic Committee announced that the Russian Olympic Committee had been suspended from the 2018 Winter Olympics. Athletes with no previous drug violations and a consistent history of drug testing were allowed to compete under the Olympic flag as an "Olympic Athlete from Russia" (OAR). Under the terms of the decree, neither the Russian flag nor anthem were to be used at the Olympics; the Olympic flag and Olympic Anthem were used instead.

The pair skating event was one of five figure skating competitions contested at the 2018 Winter Olympics in Gangneung, South Korea. It was held at the Gangneung Ice Arena over two days: the short program took place on 14 February and the free skating on 15 February. The competition featured 22 teams representing 14 nations. The 2018 Winter Olympics were the first to allow vocal music for all skating disciplines; the International Skating Union modified its policies which had limited skaters to the use of only instrumental music after the 2014 Winter Olympics. Sui Wenjing and Han Cong of China were seen as likely candidates for Olympic medals. Sui and Han were the reigning world champions and four-time Four Continents champions. They were well-regarded for their technical skill, emotional performance, and quality transitions between elements. Meagan Duhamel and Eric Radford were two-time world champions and were part of the Canadian team that had earlier won the team event. They were also two-time Four Continents champions and seven-time Canadian national champions. Aljona Savchenko and Bruno Massot were two-time German national champions, but Savchenko had previously competed with different partners. With Robin Szolkowy, they had won the bronze medals at both the 2010 and 2014 Winter Olympics, and were five-time world champions, four-time European champions, and eight-time German national champions. The 2018 Winter Olympics were the fifth for Savchenko, having previously competed three times with Szolkowy, as well as in 2002 when she was partnered with Stanislav Morozov and competed for Ukraine. Savchenko was the first pairs skater to compete at five Olympic Games.

== Qualification ==
Sixteen quota spots in the pairs event were awarded based on results at the 2017 World Championships. France had originally qualified two quota spots at the World Championships; however, they relinquished one of their spots. That extra quota spot was made available at the 2017 Nebelhorn Trophy along with the other four spots originally allocated.

Although South Korea did not qualify a pairs team through the normal process, as the host nation, they had the privilege of entering a skater or team in any skating events for which they did not otherwise qualify; in this case, their pairs team was entered as the twenty-first team. North Korea had originally qualified one quota spot in pair skating after Ryom Tae-ok and Kim Ju-sik finished in sixth place at the Nebelhorn Trophy. However, after North Korea missed the deadline to submit their entries for the Olympics, their spot was re-allocated to Japan. Following negotiations with South Korea – the first in more than two years – North Korea agreed to "actively cooperate" at the Olympics, and on 20 January 2018, the International Olympic Committee (IOC) announced that they had granted accreditation to North Korea for twenty-two athletes to compete at the Olympics as part of the "Olympic Korean Peninsula Declaration", and they allocated an additional quota spot for Ryom and Kim to compete. In addition, the IOC approved the request from the North and South Korean Olympic committees to allow the two delegations to enter the arena together under the name "Korea" during the opening ceremony. Thomas Bach, then-president of the IOC, stated: "The Olympic spirit is about respect, dialogue and understanding. The Olympic Winter Games PyeongChang 2018 are hopefully opening the door to a brighter future on the Korean Peninsula, and inviting the world to join in a celebration of hope."

Qualifying nations in pairs
Event	Teams per NOC	Qualifying NOCs	Total teams
2017 World Championships	3	China (International Olympic Committee) OAR; Canada	15
2017 World Championships	2	Germany; ~~France~~; Italy	15
2017 World Championships	1	France; United States	15
2017 Nebelhorn Trophy	1	Australia; Austria; ~~North Korea~~; Israel; Czech Republic; Japan	5
Host nation privilege	1	South Korea	1
"Olympic Korean Peninsula Declaration"	1	North Korea	1
Total			22

== Required performance elements ==
Couples competing in pair skating performed their short programs on 14 February. Lasting 2 minutes 40 seconds (+/− 10 seconds), the short program had to include the following elements: one hip lift, one double or triple twist lift, one double or triple throw jump, one double or triple solo jump, one pair spin combination with a change of foot, one death spiral, and a step sequence using the full ice surface.

The sixteen highest-scoring couples after completion of the short program moved on to the free skating, which was held on 15 February. Lasting 4 minutes 30 seconds (+/− 10 seconds), the free skate had to include the following: three pair lifts, one twist lift, two different throw jumps, one solo jump, one jump combination or sequence, one pair spin combination, one death spiral, and a choreographic sequence.

== Judging ==
Skaters were judged according to the required technical elements of their program (such as jumps and spins), as well as the overall presentation of their program, based on five components (skating skills, transitions, performance, composition, and musical interpretation/timing). Each technical element in a figure skating performance was assigned a predetermined base point value and scored by a panel of nine judges on a scale from −3 to +3 based on the quality of its execution. Each Grade of Execution (GOE) from –3 to +3 was assigned a value as indicated on the Scale of Values. For example, a triple Axel was worth a base value of 8.50 points and a GOE of +3 was worth 3.00 points, so a triple Axel with a GOE of +3 earned 11.50 points. The judging panel's GOE for each element was determined by calculating the trimmed mean (the average after discarding the highest and lowest scores). The panel's scores for all elements were added together to generate a Total Elements Score. At the same time, the judges evaluated each performance based on the five aforementioned program components and assigned each one a score from 0.25 to 10 in 0.25-point increments. The judging panel's final score for each program component was also determined by calculating the trimmed mean. Those scores were then multiplied by the factor shown on the chart below; the results were added together to generate a total Program Component Score.

Program component factoring
Discipline	Short program	Free skate
Pairs	0.80	1.60

Deductions were applied for certain violations, such as time infractions or falls. The Total Elements Score and Program Component Score were then added together, minus any deductions, to generate a final performance score for each skater or team.

== Results ==
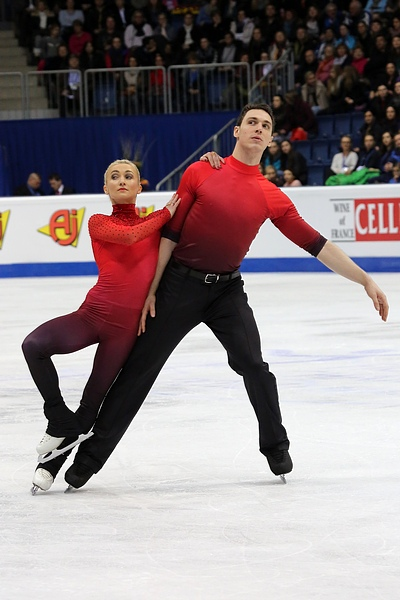
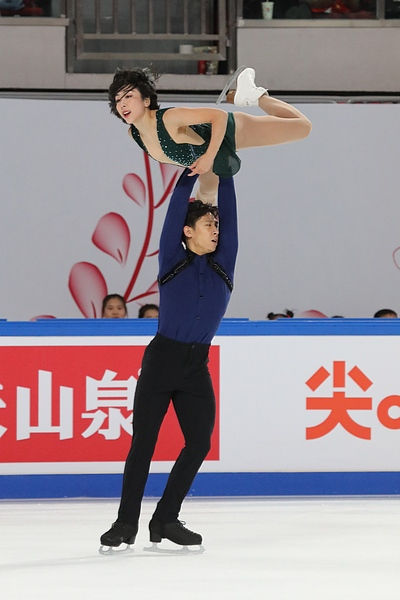
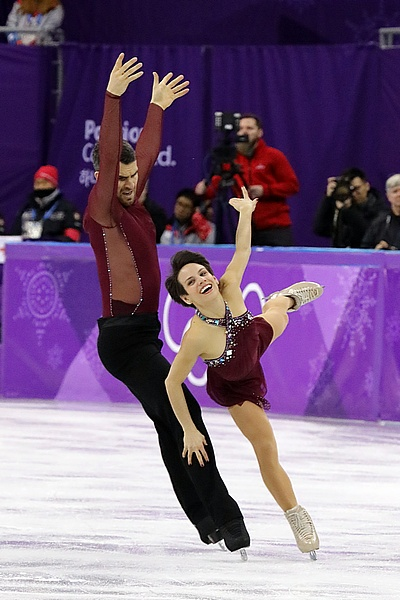
The gold, silver, and bronze medalists from the pairs event at the 2022 Winter Olympics (from left to right):
Aljona Savchenko and Bruno Massot of Germany (gold); Sui Wenjing and Han Cong of China (silver); and Meagan Duhamel and Eric Radford of Canada (bronze)

Code key

- TSS – Total Segment Score
- TES – Total Elements Score
- PCS – Program Component Score
- SS – Skating skills
- TR – Transitions
- PE – Performance
- CO – Composition
- IN – Musical interpretation
- DED – Deductions

=== Short program ===
The pairs short program was held on 14 February 2018. Sui Wenjing and Han Cong of China finished in first place, barely edging out Evgenia Tarasova and Vladimir Morozov of Russia with what Dave Skretta of the Associated Press described as a "breathtaking" performance to "Hallelujah" by Leonard Cohen. Their score of 82.39 was a new season-best and less than one point over that of Tarasova and Morozov. The Russian pair skated to a piano concerto by Sergei Rachmaninoff and scored 81.68; also a new season-best score. Meagan Duhamel and Eric Radford of Canada, who performed to April Meservy's cover of "With or Without You", finished in third place, less than one point ahead of Aljona Savchenko and Bruno Massot of Germany. Massot landed a planned triple Salchow as a double, causing the German pair to lose nearly four points from their technical score.

Some of the biggest applause of the night was received by Ryom Tae-ok and Kim Ju-sik of North Korea. Ryom and Kim, North Korea's only elite-level athletes at the Olympics, finished in eleventh place. Their goal was to be able to advance to the free skate, which required finishing among the top sixteen teams. The North Korean duo spoke positively about their experience in South Korea, including friendly interactions with the other skaters: Ryom received a birthday gift from Kim Kyu-eun, a South Korean pair skater, while Meagan Duhamel took the pair shopping. "Everyone is really supportive of them,” said Alex Kam, Kim Kyu-eun's skating partner. “It’s good to see how sports brings everyone together without boundaries." As Ryom and Kim came from what was considered the world's most isolated country, they were the focus of much attention and curiosity. Many South Koreans in the audience cheered for them and held up signs referencing Korean reunification.

Pairs short program results
Pl.	Team	Nation	TSS	TES	PCS	SS	TR	PE	CO	IN	DED
1	Sui Wenjing; Han Cong	China	82.39	44.49	37.90	9.36	9.32	9.61	9.50	9.57	0.00
2	Evgenia Tarasova; Vladimir Morozov	(International Olympic Committee) OAR	81.68	43.97	37.71	9.46	9.25	9.54	9.50	9.39	0.00
3	Meagan Duhamel; Eric Radford	Canada	76.82	41.26	35.56	8.89	8.64	8.89	9.00	9.04	0.00
4	Aljona Savchenko; Bruno Massot	Germany	76.59	39.16	37.43	9.29	9.18	9.32	9.46	9.54	0.00
5	Yu Xiaoyu; Zhang Hao	China	75.58	42.10	33.48	8.39	8.29	8.46	8.50	8.21	0.00
6	Vanessa James; Morgan Ciprès	France	75.34	40.67	34.67	8.64	8.43	8.89	8.68	8.71	0.00
7	Valentina Marchei; Ondřej Hotárek	Italy	74.50	40.36	34.14	8.32	8.29	8.68	8.68	8.71	0.00
8	Natalia Zabiiako; Alexander Enbert	(International Olympic Committee) OAR	74.35	40.13	34.22	8.68	8.25	8.64	8.57	8.64	0.00
9	Nicole Della Monica; Matteo Guarise	Italy	74.00	40.41	33.59	8.43	8.25	8.46	8.46	8.39	0.00
10	Kristina Astakhova; Alexei Rogonov	(International Olympic Committee) OAR	70.52	38.93	31.59	7.89	7.71	8.00	7.96	7.93	0.00
11	Ryom Tae-ok; Kim Ju-sik	North Korea	69.40	38.79	30.61	7.61	7.36	7.86	7.71	7.71	0.00
12	Julianne Séguin; Charlie Bilodeau	Canada	67.52	35.63	31.89	7.96	7.79	8.04	8.04	8.04	0.00
13	Kirsten Moore-Towers; Michael Marinaro	Canada	65.68	34.46	31.22	7.89	7.64	7.68	7.96	7.86	0.00
14	Alexa Scimeca Knierim; Chris Knierim	United States	65.55	34.18	31.37	7.96	7.54	7.82	7.89	8.00	0.00
15	Anna Dušková; Martin Bidař	Czech Republic	63.25	34.62	28.63	7.18	7.04	7.11	7.29	7.18	0.00
16	Annika Hocke; Ruben Blommaert	Germany	63.04	34.61	28.43	7.11	6.96	7.18	7.11	7.18	0.00
17	Peng Cheng; Jin Yang	China	62.61	33.50	30.11	7.64	7.46	7.50	7.61	7.43	1.00
18	Ekaterina Alexandrovskaya; Harley Windsor	Australia	61.55	34.70	26.85	7.00	6.64	6.75	6.71	6.46	0.00
19	Paige Conners; Evgeni Krasnopolski	Israel	60.35	34.26	26.09	6.54	6.32	6.68	6.57	6.50	0.00
20	Miriam Ziegler; Severin Kiefer	Austria	58.80	31.71	28.09	7.07	6.93	6.96	7.07	7.07	1.00
21	Miu Suzaki; Ryuichi Kihara	Japan	57.74	32.89	24.85	6.39	5.96	6.29	6.25	6.18	0.00
22	Kim Kyu-eun; Alex Kam	South Korea	42.93	21.04	22.89	6.04	5.54	5.57	5.79	5.68	1.00

=== Free skating ===
The pairs free skate was held on 15 February 2018. In a stunning rebound, Aljona Savchenko and Bruno Massot, who had finished the short program in fourth place, performed what Gabrielle Tetrault-Farbera and Elaine Lies of Reuters described as a "flawless" free skate with "flowing choreography", leapfrogging to an Olympic gold medal finish. Their free skate also set a new world record score, breaking the previous record, which had been set by them at the 2018 Grand Prix Final. Savchenko had twice won an Olympic bronze medal with her previous partner Robin Szolkowy, but this was her first Olympic gold medal. Savchenko and Massot performed a triple twist lift, a side-by-side triple Salchow-double toe loop jump combination, a throw triple flip, and a throw triple Salchow. It was Germany's first Olympic gold medal in pair skating in 66 years.

Skating to music from Turandot, Sui Wenjing and Han Cong finished in second place after they made some errors with their jumps, ultimately losing to Savchenko and Massot by 0.47 points. Sui and Han successfully performed a quadruple twist lift, a throw triple flip, and a throw triple Salchow. Meagan Duhamel and Eric Radford's performance to "Hometown Glory" by Adele featured a throw quadruple Salchow, a throw triple Lutz, and a triple Salchow-double toe loop-double toe loop jump combination. Their score of 153.33 in the free skate was a new season-best, allowing them to place second in the free skate, but they ultimately finished in third place and won the bronze medals. Evgenia Tarasova and Vladimir Morozov ultimately finished in fourth place after Tarasova missed her throw triple Salchow and landed the side-by-side triple Salchow as a double. Ryom Tae-ok and Kim Ju-sik earned a new personal-best score and finished in thirteenth place.

Pairs free skate results
Pl.	Team	Nation	TSS	TES	PCS	SS	TR	PE	CO	IN	DED
1	Aljona Savchenko; Bruno Massot	Germany	159.31	82.07	77.24	9.57	9.46	9.82	9.64	9.79	0.00
2	Meagan Duhamel; Eric Radford	Canada	153.33	79.86	73.47	9.21	9.04	9.32	9.21	9.14	0.00
3	Sui Wenjing; Han Cong	China	153.08	76.29	76.79	9.57	9.46	9.54	9.71	9.71	0.00
4	Evgenia Tarasova; Vladimir Morozov	(International Olympic Committee) OAR	143.25	70.08	74.17	9.54	9.18	9.14	9.32	9.18	1.00
5	Vanessa James; Morgan Ciprès	France	143.19	71.59	71.60	8.96	8.82	8.93	9.04	9.00	0.00
6	Valentina Marchei; Ondřej Hotárek	Italy	142.09	73.94	68.15	8.39	8.32	8.64	8.57	8.68	0.00
7	Natalia Zabiiako; Alexander Enbert	(International Olympic Committee) OAR	138.53	70.36	68.17	8.54	8.25	8.57	8.61	8.64	0.00
8	Julianne Séguin; Charlie Bilodeau	Canada	136.50	71.28	65.22	8.11	7.93	8.25	8.18	8.29	0.00
9	Kirsten Moore-Towers; Michael Marinaro	Canada	132.43	70.42	62.01	7.82	7.50	7.86	7.79	7.79	0.00
10	Nicole Della Monica; Matteo Guarise	Italy	128.74	64.60	65.14	8.18	8.00	8.07	8.25	8.21	1.00
11	Yu Xiaoyu; Zhang Hao	China	128.52	62.98	67.54	8.68	8.43	8.21	8.57	8.32	2.00
12	Ryom Tae-ok; Kim Ju-sik	North Korea	124.23	63.65	60.58	7.68	7.29	7.71	7.61	7.57	0.00
13	Kristina Astakhova; Alexei Rogonov	(International Olympic Committee) OAR	123.93	62.17	63.76	8.04	7.82	7.71	8.21	8.07	2.00
14	Anna Dušková; Martin Bidař	Czech Republic	123.08	64.34	58.74	7.43	7.39	7.21	7.36	7.32	0.00
15	Alexa Scimeca Knierim; Chris Knierim	United States	120.27	60.57	60.70	7.68	7.54	7.43	7.75	7.54	1.00
16	Annika Hocke; Ruben Blommaert	Germany	108.94	53.79	55.15	6.93	6.82	6.79	7.00	6.93	0.00

=== Overall ===
Pairs results
Rank	Team	Nation	Total	SP		FS	
1st place, gold medalist(s)	Aljona Savchenko; Bruno Massot	Germany	235.90	4	76.59	1	159.31
2nd place, silver medalist(s)	Sui Wenjing; Han Cong	China	235.47	1	82.39	3	153.08
3rd place, bronze medalist(s)	Meagan Duhamel; Eric Radford	Canada	230.15	3	76.82	2	153.33
4	Evgenia Tarasova; Vladimir Morozov	(International Olympic Committee) OAR	224.93	2	81.68	4	143.25
5	Vanessa James; Morgan Ciprès	France	218.53	6	75.34	5	143.19
6	Valentina Marchei; Ondřej Hotárek	Italy	216.59	7	74.50	6	142.09
7	Natalia Zabiiako; Alexander Enbert	(International Olympic Committee) OAR	212.88	8	74.35	7	138.53
8	Yu Xiaoyu; Zhang Hao	China	204.10	5	75.58	11	128.52
9	Julianne Séguin; Charlie Bilodeau	Canada	204.02	12	67.52	8	136.50
10	Nicole Della Monica; Matteo Guarise	Italy	202.74	9	74.00	10	128.74
11	Kirsten Moore-Towers; Michael Marinaro	Canada	198.11	13	65.68	9	132.43
12	Kristina Astakhova; Alexei Rogonov	(International Olympic Committee) OAR	194.45	10	70.52	13	123.93
13	Ryom Tae-ok; Kim Ju-sik	North Korea	193.63	11	69.40	12	124.23
14	Anna Dušková; Martin Bidař	Czech Republic	186.33	15	63.25	14	123.08
15	Alexa Scimeca Knierim; Chris Knierim	United States	185.82	14	65.55	15	120.27
16	Annika Hocke; Ruben Blommaert	Germany	171.98	16	63.04	16	108.94
17	Peng Cheng; Jin Yang	China	62.61	17	62.61	Did not advance to free skate	
18	Ekaterina Alexandrovskaya; Harley Windsor	Australia	61.55	18	61.55	Did not advance to free skate	
19	Paige Conners; Evgeni Krasnopolski	Israel	60.35	19	60.35	Did not advance to free skate	
20	Miriam Ziegler; Severin Kiefer	Austria	58.80	20	58.80	Did not advance to free skate	
21	Miu Suzaki; Ryuichi Kihara	Japan	57.74	21	57.74	Did not advance to free skate	
22	Kim Kyu-eun; Alex Kam	South Korea	42.93	22	42.93	Did not advance to free skate	

== Records ==
The following new record high score was set during this competition.

Record high scores
Date	Skater(s)	Segment	Score	Ref.
15 February	(Germany); Aljona Savchenko; Bruno Massot	Free skate	159.31	

== Judging investigation ==
The International Skating Union (ISU) launched an investigation into two Chinese judges following the 2018 Winter Olympics: Chen Weiguang, who had been a judge in the men's event, and Huang Feng, who had been a judge in the pairs event. It was determined that both judges had given "preferential marking" to Chinese skaters and deliberately low scores to their strongest competitors. The investigation into Huang began in March 2018 and was concluded in June 2018. Huang had given Sui Wenjing and Han Cong of China scores of +3 in seven different elements, while giving Aljona Savchenko and Bruno Massot of Germany the lowest scores of all nine judges. The ISU concluded that Huang had "obviously favoured his pair... vis-à-vis the other top candidates for the Olympic gold medal". As a result, he received a one-year suspension from judging. The ISU described the behavior of both judges as "one of the most serious ethical offences" that a judge can commit.

== Works cited ==
- "Special Regulations & Technical Rules – Single & Pair Skating and Ice Dance 2016". International Skating Union. p. 24. Archived from the original on 4 January 2018.
