= Thita Lamsam =

Thai figure skater

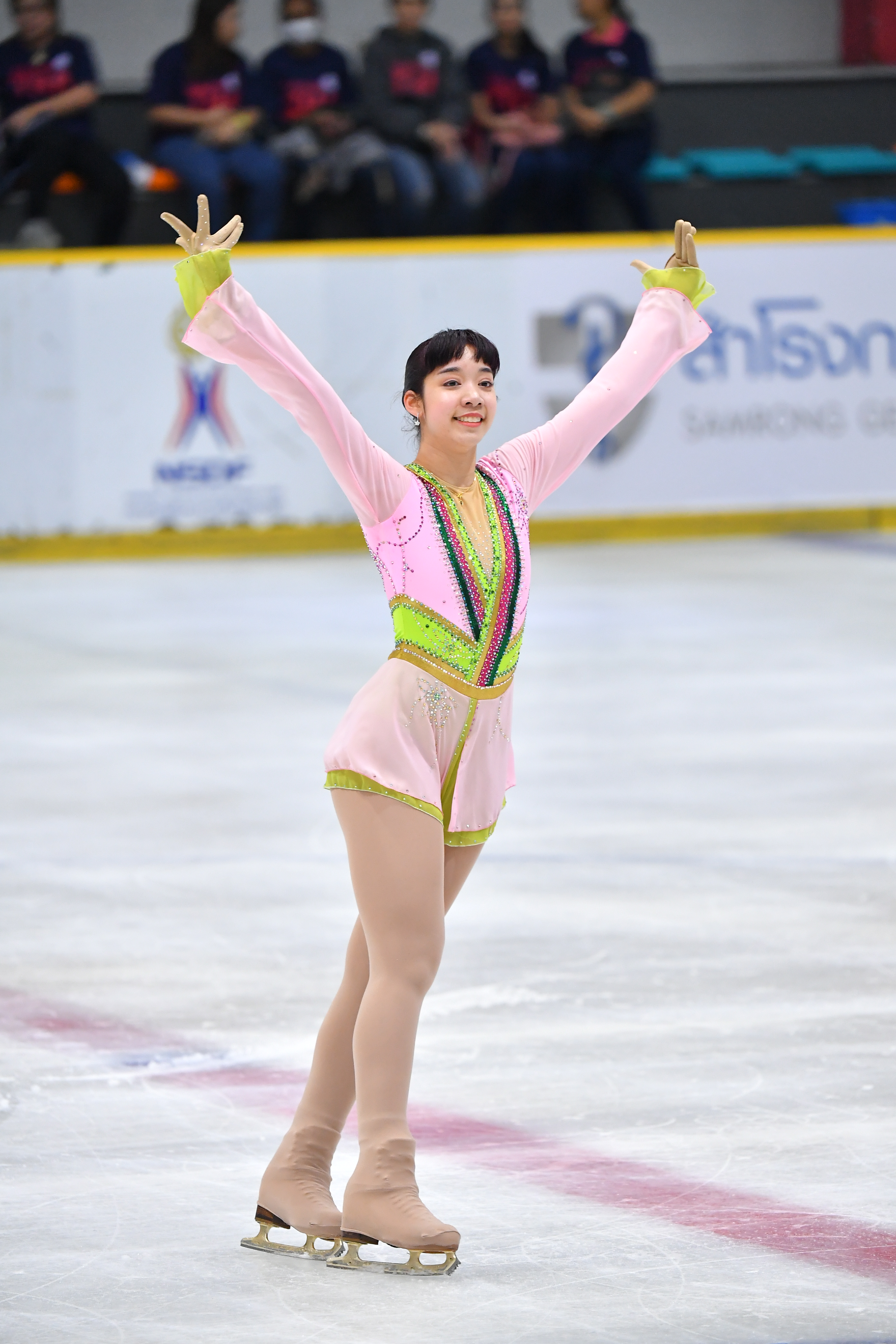

Personal information
- Born: January 17, 2000 (age 26) Bangkok, Thailand
- Height: 164 cm (5 ft 5 in)

Figure skating career
- Country: Thailand
- Coach: Kirsten Miller-Zisholz, Rui Pang
- Skating club: Imperial World Ice Skating
- Began skating: 2007

Palmy (Thita) Lamsam (born 17 January 2000) is a Thai former figure skater. She is a five-time Thai national champion (2014, 2016, 2018, 2019 and 2020) and a 2016 FBMA Trophy bronze medalist. She competed in the final segment of two ISU Championships – the 2016 Four Continents, finishing 22nd, and the 2018 Four Continents, finishing 23rd.

== Biography ==
Lamsam became interested in figure skating after watching the movie Ice Princess. As there were no rinks in Thailand at the time, she and her sister would pretend to skate in their socks. She was able to begin skating at age 7 and often trained in the United States during holiday breaks.

She was the first Thai skater to qualify for the World Junior Figure Skating Championships.

Lamsam studied at Michigan State University in the United States, then took a gap year to focus on figure skating before beginning the Marriage and Family Therapy program at Northwestern University. In 2021, she appeared on The Iron Butterfly, a podcast hosted by fellow figure skater Polina Edmunds, where she discussed mental health struggles she went through as a competitor, including an eating disorder.

She retired from competition in February 2023. She is now a licensed therapist.

== Programs ==
Season	Short Program	Free Skating
2021–2022	Adios Nonino by Astor Piazzolla	Memoirs of a Geisha by John Williams
2017–2018	The Tale of Princess Kaguya by Joe Hisaishi	The Phantom of the Opera by Andrew Lloyd Webber
2016–2017	Save My Soul by Big Bad Voodoo Daddy; Diamonds Are a Girl's Best Friend performed by Nicole Kidman	The Phantom of the Opera by Andrew Lloyd Webber
2015–2016	Cinderella by Sergei Prokofiev	Red Violin; Fire Dance by Bill Whelan
2014–2015	Cinderella by Sergei Prokofiev	Red Violin; Fire Dance by Bill Whelan
2013–2014	I Got Rhythm by George Gershwin	Giselle Variation by Adolphe Adam
2009–2010		Carmen by Georges Bizet

== Results ==
CS: Challenger Series; JGP: Junior Grand Prix

International
Event	10–11	11–12	12–13	13–14	14–15	15–16	16–17	17–18	18–19	19–20	20–21	21–22	22–23
Four Continents						22nd		23rd					
CS Alpen Trophy									29th				
CS Finlandia													25th
CS Golden Spin						14th							WD
CS Nebelhorn								28th	WD			36th	
Asian Games							17th						
Asian Open						5th		8th				WD	
FBMA Trophy						3rd	14th	5th					
Hellmut Seibt			14th										
NRW Trophy						10th							
Skate Helena							12th						
SEA Games								6th		4th			
Winter Universiade									27th				
International: Junior
Junior Worlds				38th	43rd	43rd							
JGP Canada									20th				
JGP Croatia					23rd	21st							
JGP Czech Republic				13th	17th								
JGP France							17th						
JGP Latvia								32nd					
JGP Poland						27th							
Asian Open				6th	11th								
Dragon Trophy				7th				22nd					
Dubai Golden Cup				1st									
Skate Celje				12th									
Triglav Trophy	21st												
National
Thai Champ.			3rd	1st	2nd	1st	2nd	1st	1st	1st			
Thai Junior Champ.			1st										
