= Charley, My Boy =

1924 song by Ted Fio Rito and Gus Kahn

- Song by Ted Fiorito
- Text: Gus Kahn
- Publisher: Irving Berlin Inc.
- Recorded: 1924
- Scoring: Voice and piano

Audio sample
- Recording of Charley, My Boy, performed by Billy Murray (1924): file; help

"Charley, My Boy" is a song with music by Ted Fio Rito and lyrics by Gus Kahn. The Russo-FioRito Oriole Orchestra introduced the song in 1924. The most popular recording was released by Eddie Cantor. The sheet music was published for voice and piano by Irving Berlin Inc., and in Australia by J. Albert & Son.

The refrain is four lines, of which the first two are:

Charley, my boy; oh, Charley, my boy
You thrill me, you chill me, with shivers of joy

It is sung from the viewpoint of a woman enamored of a man whom she finds to be an exceptional lover, even better than Romeo:

And when we dance, I read in your glance
Whole pages and ages of love and romance
They tell me Romeo was some lover, too
But boy, he should have taken lessons from you

On July 18, 1923, singing comedian Eddie Cantor recorded the song, which he released as a single on Columbia Records in 1924. It was recorded by several of his contemporaries, including Billy Murray. Murray's version is wrapped inside a lively instrumental that is clearly intended for dancing the Charleston or other popular Jazz Age dances. Murray's version featured a short instrumental interlude between the two sets of verses, which included a bar from an earlier Murray recording with a similar theme, also introduced by Eddie Cantor:

He's not so good in a crowd,
But when you get him alone,
You'd Be Surprised

In 1949, "Charley" was recorded on the Decca Records label by the Andrews Sisters as the A-side of a single which had "She Wore A Yellow Ribbon" (from the popular 1949 John Wayne movie of the same name) as the B-side. It was also one of two theme songs used by the popular radio program The Spike Jones Show.

It is now most easily found as a square dance tune, with at least three different publications, two by MacGregor and one by Hi Hat Records, the latter using the alternate spelling and punctuation "Charlie, My Boy." Several of the old versions, including the performance by Billy Murray, are available on YouTube.
