= Tsao Chih-i =

Taiwanese figure skater

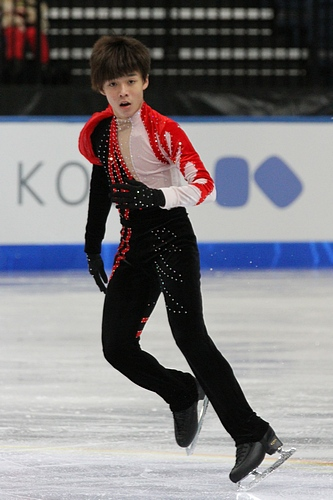
- Tsao in 2012

Personal information
- Native name: 曹志禕
- Born: October 6, 1997 (age 29) Taipei, Taiwan
- Home town: Taipei
- Height: 1.68 m (5 ft 6 in)

Figure skating career
- Country: Chinese Taipei
- Coach: Anthony Liu; Song Gao
- Skating club: Desert Ice Castle; Taipei Arena
- Began skating: 2007

Tsao Chih-I (Chinese: 曹志禕; born October 6, 1997) is a Taiwanese figure skater. He is a seven-time national champion of Taiwan. He has qualified to the final segment at five World Junior Championships and five Four Continents Championships.

== Programs ==
Season	Short program	Free skating
2019–2020	Rain, In Your Black Eyes by Ezio Bosso	House of the Rising Sun by Heavy Young Heathens; I'll Take Care of You by Beth Hart
2018-19	Je suis malade by Serge Lama	Heroes Crusade by Immediate Music; The Vision by X-Ray Dog; Gods and Demons by Future World Music
2017–2018	Je suis malade by Serge Lama; Feeling Good by Michael Bublé	Heroes Crusade by Immediate Music; The Vision by X-Ray Dog; Gods and Demons by Future World Music
2016–2017	Feeling Good by Michael Bublé	Adiós Nonino by Astor Piazzolla
2014–2016	Beethoven's Last Night by Trans-Siberian Orchestra	Romeo and Juliet performed by Edvin Marton
2013–2014	Fantasy for Violin and Orchestra (from Ladies in Lavender) performed by Joshua Bell	Loreley by Naoki Sato
2012–2013	Fantasy for Violin and Orchestra (from Ladies in Lavender) performed by Joshua Bell; Dark Eyes; Sing, Sing, Sing	Loreley by Naoki Sato; Dark Angel; Secret; Requiem For a Tower
2011–2012	Jumping Jack by Big Bad Voodoo Daddy; Bolero (from Moulin Rouge!)	Requiem For a Tower; The Three Musketeers

== Competitive highlights ==
CS: Challenger Series; JGP: Junior Grand Prix

International
Event	11–12	12–13	13–14	14–15	15–16	16–17	17–18	18–19	19–20
Worlds						32nd	30th		
Four Continents			18th	19th	21st	19th	17th	WD	23rd
GP Cup of China									12th
CS Asian Open								2nd	9th
CS Nebelhorn							15th		
CS Ondrej Nepela							14th		
Asian Games						11th			
Asian Trophy				4th		5th	4th		
FBMA Trophy					2nd				
Golden Bear						9th			
Hellmut Seibt			5th						
Warsaw Cup								2nd	
Universiade						18th			
International: Junior
Junior Worlds	23rd	23rd	18th	27th	20th	18th			
JGP Australia	11th								
JGP Belarus			6th						
JGP Croatia		9th							
JGP Japan				8th		8th			
JGP Poland			7th						
JGP Slovenia				12th					
JGP U.S.		11th							
Asian Trophy	5th	1st	2nd						
NRW Trophy	10th	7th							
Toruń Cup		1st							
National
Taiwan Champ.	1st J	1st J	1st	1st	1st	1st	1st	1st	1st
N = Advanced Novice level; J = Junior level; WD = Withdrew
