= Chantelle Kerry =

Australian figure skater

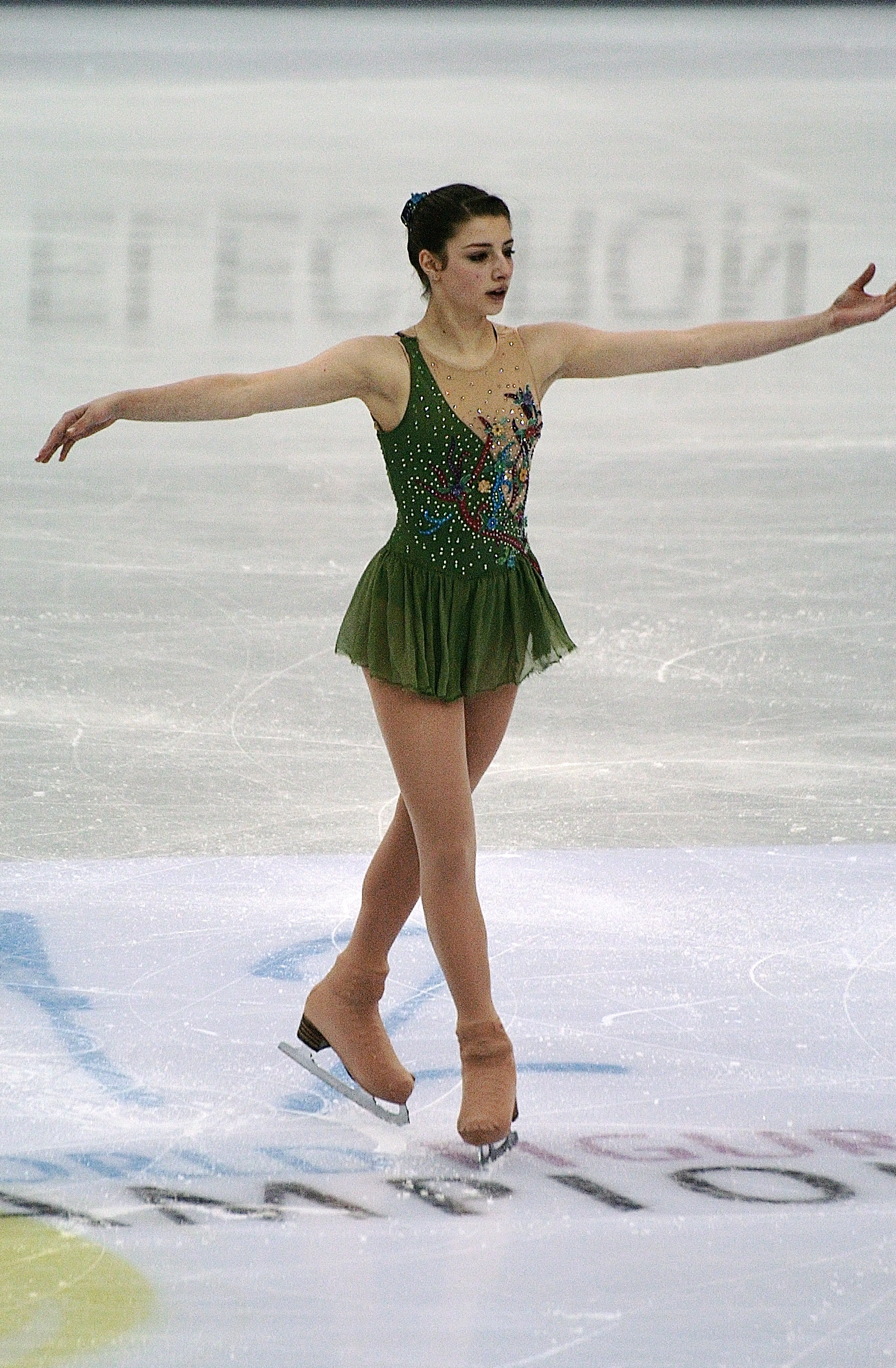
- Kerry in Nice, France at the 2012 World Championships

Personal information
- Born: 9 June 1996 (age 30) Sydney
- Home town: Sydney
- Height: 1.59 m (5 ft 2 1/2 in)

Figure skating career
- Country: Australia
- Coach: Monica MacDonald; Kylie Fennel
- Skating club: Macquarie ISC
- Began skating: 2005

Chantelle Kerry (born 9 June 1996) is an Australian figure skater. As an ice dancer with Andrew Dodds, she is a two-time Australian national champion and has competed at two Four Continents Championships. Earlier in her career, she competed in ladies' singles. She is the 2013 Skate Down Under champion and 2013 Australian national champion, and competed in the final segment at two Four Continents.

== Personal life ==
Chantelle Kerry was born on 9 June 1996, in Sydney, Australia. She is the daughter of Monica MacDonald, a former competitive ice dancer, and sister of Brendan Kerry, who competes in men's singles.

On June 11, 2022, she became engaged to American ice dancer Zachary Donohue. They were married on September 18, 2022, in Sydney, Australia.

== Skating career ==
Kerry joined a skating club, Macquarie ISC in Sydney, in 2005. She won her first junior national title in the 2010–2011 season and repeated in 2011–2012. She debuted on the ISU Junior Grand Prix series in autumn 2011. In January 2012, Kerry competed at the Winter Youth Olympics and finished 10th. After placing 17th at the 2012 Four Continents Championships, she came in 22nd in the preliminary round at her first World Championships and did not advance further.

In the 2012–2013 season, Kerry became the Australian senior champion and placed 14th at the 2013 Four Continents. At the start of the following season, she won gold at Skate Down Under.

Kerry passed her senior ice dancing tests in 2016 and had a tryout with single skater, Andrew Dodds, in April 2017. They announced their partnership in mid-May, after Dodds had passed his own dance tests. The two are coached by Monica MacDonald and John Dunn in Sydney, Australia.

== Programs ==
=== Ice dancing ===
Season	Rhythm dance	Free dance
2019–2020	Swing: Sweet Transvestite; Jive: Time Warp from The Rocky Horror Picture Show by Richard O'Brien, Richard Hartley	Love Is a Bitch by Two Feet; Never Tear Us Apart by INXS; Love Is a Bitch by Two Feet
2018–2019	Tango, Blues: Sweet Dreams (Are Made of This); Wachet auf, ruft uns die Stimme, BWV 140 performed by Laurindo Almeida; Night Fever performed by Bee Gees	Enchantress by Two Steps from Hell; 03 - Victory 1 - Extreme Music/Two Steps from Hell by Nick Phoenix / Thomas Bergersen; Your Disco Needs You by Kylie Minogue
	Short dance	
2017–2018	Ain't No Sunshine by Bill Withers; Let's Get Loud by Jennifer Lopez	Ruled by Secrecy by Muse

=== Single skating ===
Season	Short program	Free skating
2014–2015	My Immortal by Evanescence	Black Swan by Pyotr Ilyich Tchaikovsky, Clint Mansell
2013–2014	My Immortal by Evanescence	Once Upon a Time by Mark Isham
2012–2013	The Balcony by Marcelo Zarvos	Alice in Wonderland by Danny Elfman; Alice Returns; Blood of the Jabberwocky; Proposal; Alice Returns
2011–2012	Zoot Zoot Riot by Cherry Poppin Daddies; The Silver Strut by Rickey Woodad; Zoot Zoot Riot by Cherry Poppin Daddies	Alice in Wonderland by Danny Elfman; Alice Returns; Blood of the Jabberwocky; Proposal; Alice Returns

== Competitive highlights ==
CS: Challenger Series; JGP: Junior Grand Prix

=== Ice dancing with Dodds ===
International
Event	17–18	18–19	19–20	20–21	21–22
Worlds	30th	26th			
Four Continents	13th	10th	14th		WD
CS Alpen Trophy		11th			
CS Asian Open		4th	WD		
CS Finlandia Trophy					14th
CS Lombardia Trophy					WD
CS Warsaw Cup	13th		12th		
Cup of Nice	16th				
Lake Placid IDI					9th
Mezzaluna Cup					2nd
Open d'Andorra			4th		4th
Toruń Cup			14th		
U.S. Classic					6th
Warsaw Cup		5th			
National
Australian Champ.	1st	1st	2nd	C	C
TBD = Assigned; C = Event cancelled

=== Ladies' singles ===
International
Event	09–10	10–11	11–12	12–13	13–14	14–15	15–16
Worlds			40th				
Four Continents			17th	14th			
Open d'Andorra							3rd
Skate Down Under					1st		
International: Junior
Youth Olympics			10th				
JGP Australia			13th				
JGP Croatia				11th			
JGP Estonia			24th		17th		
JGP Japan						19th	
JGP Poland					8th		
JGP Slovenia				19th			
NZ Winter Games	3rd		2nd				
National
Australian Champ.	2nd J	1st J	1st J	1st	WD		3rd
J = Junior level; WD = Withdrew
