= 2026 CS Warsaw Cup =

Figure skating competition

2026 Warsaw Cup
- Type: ISU Challenger Series
- Date: 25 November – 29 November
- Season: 2026–27
- Location: Warsaw, Poland
- Host: Polish Figure Skating Association
- Venue: Arena COS Torwar
- Previous: 2025 Warsaw Cup
- Previous CS: 2026 Tallinn Trophy
- Next CS: 2026 Golden Spin of Zagreb

The 2026 Warsaw Cup is a figure skating competition sanctioned by the International Skating Union (ISU), organized and hosted by the Polish Figure Skating Association, and the eleventh event of the 2026–27 ISU Challenger Series. It will be held at the Arena COS Torwar in Warsaw, Poland, from 25 to 29 November 2026. Medals will be awarded in men's singles, women's singles, pair skating, and ice dance, and skaters will earn ISU World Standing points based on their results.

== Background ==
The inaugural edition of the Warsaw Cup was held in 2002 and consisted only of the men's and women's events at the junior level. The Warsaw Cup was exclusively a junior-level competition until 2010, when a senior-level pairs event was added. Men's and women's events at the senior level were added in 2012.

The ISU Challenger Series was introduced in 2014. It is a series of international figure skating competitions sanctioned by the ISU and organized by ISU member nations. Its objective is to ensure consistent organization and structure within a series of linked international competitions, providing opportunities for senior-level skaters to compete at the international level and to earn ISU World Standing points. The Warsaw Cup was a Challenger Series event from 2014 to 2017. It was held in 2018, but not as part of the Challenger Series, and returned to the Challenger Series in 2019. No competition was held in 2020 due to the COVID-19 pandemic. The competition returned in 2021 and has been a Challenger Series event ever since. In 2025, a pairs event was held, but it was not part of the Challenger Series. The 2026–27 Challenger Series consists of thirteen events, of which the Warsaw Cup is the eleventh, and this year's edition features all four disciplines.

== Entries ==
The International Skating Union published the list of entrants following the release of the event announcement.

Entries
Country	Men	Women	Pairs	Ice dance
Armenia	Mikayel Salazaryan	—N/a	—N/a	—N/a
Austria	Tobia Oellerer	—N/a	—N/a	—N/a
Belgium	—N/a	—N/a	—N/a	Olivia Josephine Shilling; Léo Baeten
Bulgaria	Beat Schümperli	Krista Georgieva	—N/a	—N/a
Bulgaria	Alexander Zlatkov	Krista Georgieva	—N/a	—N/a
China	—N/a	—N/a	Liu Xuanyu; Han Wenbao	—N/a
Chinese Taipei	Li Yu-hsiang	Tsai Yu-feng	—N/a	—N/a
Croatia	Maksim Varakin	—N/a	—N/a	—N/a
Czech Republic	Georgii Reshtenko	Kateřina Hanušová	—N/a	—N/a
Czech Republic	Tadeáš Václavík	Michaela Málková	—N/a	—N/a
Czech Republic	Tadeáš Václavík	Barbora Vránková	—N/a	—N/a
Estonia	—N/a	Nataly Langerbaur	—N/a	—N/a
Estonia	—N/a	Olesja Leonova	—N/a	—N/a
Estonia	—N/a	Kristina Lisovskaja	—N/a	—N/a
Finland	Matias Lindfors	Janna Jyrkinen	—N/a	Daniela Ivanitskiy; Matthew Sperry
Finland	Makar Suntsev	Minja Peltonen	—N/a	Daniela Ivanitskiy; Matthew Sperry
Finland	Valtter Virtanen	Selma Välitalo	—N/a	Daniela Ivanitskiy; Matthew Sperry
France	Samy Hammi	Milana Mozeiko	—N/a	Celina Fradji; Jean-Hans Fourneaux
France	Xan Rols	Milana Mozeiko	—N/a	Natacha Lagouge; Arnaud Caffa
France	Corentin Spinar	Milana Mozeiko	—N/a	Evgeniia Lopareva; Geoffrey Brissaud
Georgia	Makar Nikolaev	—N/a	—N/a	—N/a
Germany	Nikita Starostin	—N/a	—N/a	Charise Matthaei; Max Liebers
Great Britain	Jedidiah Lincoln	—N/a	—N/a	—N/a
Hungary	—N/a	Polina Dzsumanyijazova	—N/a	Emese Csiszér; Mark Shapiro
(Individual Neutral Athletes) Individual Neutral Athlete	—N/a	—N/a	—N/a	Anna Kolomenskaia; Artem Frolov
(Individual Neutral Athletes) Individual Neutral Athlete	—N/a	—N/a	—N/a	Ekaterina Mironova; Evgenii Ustenko
Israel	Mark Gorodnitsky	Mariia Dmitrieva	—N/a	Shira Ichilov; Mikhail Nosovitskiy
Israel	Tamir Kuperman	Julia Fennell	—N/a	Shira Ichilov; Mikhail Nosovitskiy
Israel	Lev Vinokur	Elizabet Gervits	—N/a	Shira Ichilov; Mikhail Nosovitskiy
Italy	Nikolaj Memola	Gioia Fiori	Sofia Tridello; Alberto Tommasi	Giulia Isabella Paolino; Andrea Tuba
Kazakhstan	Rakhat Bralin	—N/a	—N/a	—N/a
Kyrgyzstan	—N/a	Zhasmin Shlaga	—N/a	—N/a
Latvia	Nikolajs Krivoseja	Paula Belevica	—N/a	—N/a
Latvia	Nikolajs Krivoseja	Linda Dzerve	—N/a	—N/a
Latvia	Nikolajs Krivoseja	Adelija Matjunina	—N/a	—N/a
Lithuania	—N/a	Evelina Stavickytė	—N/a	—N/a
Lithuania	—N/a	Meda Variakojytė	—N/a	—N/a
Mexico	—N/a	Andrea Montesinos Cantú	—N/a	—N/a
Monaco	Davide Lewton Brain	—N/a	—N/a	—N/a
Netherlands	—N/a	Julia van Dijk	—N/a	—N/a
Netherlands	—N/a	Jolanda Vos	—N/a	—N/a
New Zealand	Yanhao Li	—N/a	—N/a	—N/a
Norway	Daniil Valanov	—N/a	—N/a	—N/a
Poland	Jakub Lofek	Karolina Białas	—N/a	Zofia Grzegorzewska; Oleg Muratov
Poland	Kornel Witkowski	Julia Kasprzyk	—N/a	Xuantong Li; Filip Bojanowski
Poland	Matvii Yefymenko	Ekaterina Kurakova	—N/a	Xuantong Li; Filip Bojanowski
Poland	Matvii Yefymenko	Oliwia Strokosz	—N/a	Xuantong Li; Filip Bojanowski
Poland	Matvii Yefymenko	Yelyzaveta Surova	—N/a	Xuantong Li; Filip Bojanowski
Poland	Matvii Yefymenko	Laura Szczęsna	—N/a	Xuantong Li; Filip Bojanowski
Slovakia	Jozef Curma	Olivia Lengyelová	—N/a	—N/a
Slovakia	Jozef Curma	Vanesa Šelmeková	—N/a	—N/a
South Korea	—N/a	—N/a	—N/a	Hannah Kihyun Kim; Ye Quan
Spain	Mahery Randrianarivony	Ariadna Gupta Espada	—N/a	Philomène Sabourin; Raúl Bermejo
Spain	Mahery Randrianarivony	Ariadna Gupta Espada	—N/a	Sofía Val; Asaf Kazimov
Sweden	—N/a	—N/a	—N/a	Milla Ruud Reitan; Nikolaj Majorov
Switzerland	Aurelian Chervet	Sayra Bessire	Laura Gauch; Linus Mager	Arianna Sassi; Luca Morini
Switzerland	Ean Weiler	Ophélie Clerc	Laura Gauch; Linus Mager	Arianna Sassi; Luca Morini
Ukraine	Kyrylo Marsak	Sofiia Ekzarkhova	—N/a	Zoe Larson; Andrii Kapran
Ukraine	Kyrylo Marsak	Sofiia Hryhorenko	—N/a	Zoe Larson; Andrii Kapran
Ukraine	Kyrylo Marsak	Sofiia Rymshyna	—N/a	Zoe Larson; Andrii Kapran
United States	Lucas Broussard	Alexa Gasparotto	Starr Andrews; Daniil Parkman	Isabella Flores; Linus Colmor Jepsen
United States	Lucius Kazanecki	Alexa Gasparotto	Katie McBeath; Balázs Nagy	Eva Pate; Logan Bye
United States	Jacob Sanchez	Alexa Gasparotto	Sarah Nunez; Blake Eisenach	Eva Pate; Logan Bye

=== Changes to preliminary entries ===
Discipline	Withdrew		Added		Notes	Ref.
Discipline	Date	Skater(s)	Date	Skater(s)	Notes	Ref.
Men	Nov 21	(Armenia); Mikayel Salazaryan				
Men	Nov 21	(Bulgaria); Beat Schuemperli				
Men	Nov 21	(Bulgaria); Alexander Zlatkov				
Men	Nov 21	(Georgia (country)); Makar Nikolaev				
Men	Nov 21	(Israel); Tamir Kuperman				
Men	Nov 21	(Kazakhstan); Rakhat Bralin				
Men	Nov 21	(United States); Jacob Sanchez				
Women	Nov 21	(Bulgaria); Krista Georgieva				
Women	Nov 21	(Slovenia); Vanesa Selmekova				
Pairs	Nov 21	(United States); Katie McBeath; Balazs Nagy				
Ice dance	Nov 21	(France); Evgeniia Lopareva; Geoffrey Brissaud				
Ice dance	Nov 21	(South Korea); Hannah Kim; Ye Quan				
Ice dance	Nov 21	(United States); Eva Pate; Evan Bye				

== Required performance elements ==
=== Single skating ===
Men and women competing in single skating first perform their short programs. Lasting no more than 2 minutes 40 seconds, the short program has to include the following elements:

For men: one double or triple Axel; one triple or quadruple jump; one jump combination consisting of a double jump and a triple jump, two triple jumps, or a quadruple jump and a double jump or triple jump; one flying spin; one camel spin or sit spin with a change of foot; one spin combination with a change of foot; and one step sequence using the full ice surface.

For women: one double or triple Axel; one triple jump; one jump combination consisting of a double jump and a triple jump, or two triple jumps; one flying spin; one layback spin, sideways leaning spin, camel spin, or sit spin without a change of foot; one spin combination with a change of foot; and one step sequence using the full ice surface.

Men and women then perform their free skates. The free skate can last no more than 4 minutes, and has to include the following: six jump elements, of which one has to be an Axel-type jump; three spins, of which one has to be a spin combination, one a flying spin, and one a choreographic spin; one step sequence; and a choreographic sequence.

=== Pair skating ===
Couples competing in pair skating first perform their short programs. Lasting no more than 2 minutes 40 seconds, the short program has to include the following elements: one pair lift, one double or triple twist lift, one double or triple throw jump, one double or triple solo jump, one pair spin combination, one death spiral, and one step sequence using the full ice surface.

Couples then perform their free skates. The free skate can last no more than 4 minutes, and has to include the following: two pair lifts, one twist lift, two different throw jumps, one solo jump, one jump combination or sequence, one choreographic pair spin, one choreographic pair lift, and one death spiral.

=== Ice dance ===
Couples competing in ice dance first perform their rhythm dances. The rhythm dance can last no more than 2 minutes 50 seconds, and the theme this season is "Rhythm and Waltz". The rhythm dance has to include the following elements: one section of the Golden Waltz pattern dance, one creative dance element, one dance lift, one set of sequential twizzles, and one step sequence while not touching.

Couples then perform their free dances. The free dance can last no longer than 4 minutes, and has to include the following: three dance lifts, or one short lift and one combination lift; one dance spin; one step sequence in hold; one set of synchronized twizzles; one one-foot turns sequence in hold; and two choreographic elements.

== Judging ==
Skaters are judged according to the required technical elements of their program (such as jumps and spins), as well as the overall presentation of their program, based on three program components (skating skills, presentation, and composition). Each technical element in a figure skating performance is assigned a predetermined base point value and scored by a panel of nine judges on a scale from −5 to +5 based on the quality of its execution. Each Grade of Execution (GOE) from −5 to +5 is assigned a value as indicated on the Scale of Values. For example, a triple Axel is worth a base value of 8.00 points, and a GOE of +3 is worth 2.40 points, so a triple Axel with a GOE of +3 earns 10.40 points. The judging panel's GOE for each element is determined by calculating the trimmed mean (the average after discarding the highest and lowest scores). The panel's scores for all elements are added together to generate a Total Elements Score. At the same time, the judges evaluate each performance based on the three aforementioned program components and assign each a score from 0.25 to 10 in 0.25-point increments. The judging panel's final score for each program component is also determined by calculating the trimmed mean. Those scores are then multiplied by the factor shown on the chart below; the results are added together to generate a total Program Component Score.

Program component factoring
Discipline	Short program or rhythm dance	Free skate or free dance
Men	1.67	3.33
Women	1.33	2.67
Pairs	1.33	2.67
Ice dance	1.33	2.00

Deductions are applied for certain violations, such as time infractions, stops and restarts, or falls. The Total Elements Score and Program Component Score are then added together, minus any deductions, to generate a final performance score for each skater or team.

== Works cited ==
- "Sports Rules – Single & Pair Skating and Ice Dance" (PDF). International Skating Union. Archived (PDF) from the original on 24 May 2026.
