= Rodney Clark =

Rodney Clark may refer to:

- Rodney Clark Donalds, Panamanian musician
- Rodney Clark, a short-time musician for The Moody Blues

== See also ==
- Rodney Clarke, Australian ice dancer
