= Matilda Friend =

Australian ice dancer

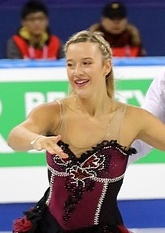
- Friend in 2017

Personal information
- Born: 30 August 1999 (age 26) Sydney
- Home town: Sydney
- Height: 1.58 m (5 ft 2 in)

Figure skating career
- Country: Australia
- Coach: Monica MacDonald; John Dunn
- Skating club: Macquarie ISC
- Began skating: 2007
- Retired: August 10, 2021

Matilda Friend (born 30 August 1999) is an Australian former competitive ice dancer. With her skating partner, William Badaoui, she is the 2016 Australian national champion and represented Australia at five Four Continents Figure Skating Championships.

== Career ==
Early in her career, Friend skated with Patrick Adderley. They won two Australian junior titles.

By the 2014–15 season, Friend had teamed up with William Badaoui. The two debuted on the ISU Junior Grand Prix (JGP) series and won the first of their three junior national titles.

In 2015–16, Friend/Badaoui returned to the JGP series and also made their senior international debut at the Open d'Andorra, in November 2015. They then competed at their first ISU Championships, placing 16th at the 2016 Four Continents Championships, held in February in Taiwan, and 30th at the 2016 World Junior Championships, which took place in March in Hungary.

Friend/Badaoui took the Australian national senior title in the 2016–17 season. They finished 15th at the 2017 Four Continents Championships in South Korea and 25th at the 2017 World Junior Championships in Taiwan.

The duo competed at three more Four Continents, placing 14th in 2018, 12th in 2019, and 15th in 2020.

They trained at Macquarie Ice Rink under 1988 Winter Olympian Monica MacDonald.

== Programs ==
with Badaoui

Season	Rhythm dance	Free dance
2019–2020	Priscilla, Queen of the Desert (musical); Disco: I Will Survive; Quickstep: Night Fever	Game of Thrones by Ramin Djawadi; Jenny of Oldstones; Game of Thrones Theme
2018–2019	Tango: Tango A La Haut by Tango Society	Million Reasons by Lady Gaga; Someone like You by Adele
2017–2018	Samba: Arranca by Manzanita; Rhumba: I'm Not Giving Up On You by Gloria Estefan; Samba: Arranca by Manzanita	Love Story by Henry Mancini
2016–2017	Hip Hop: One More Night by Maroon 5; Blues: Why Don't You Do Right? (from Who Framed Roger Rabbit); Hip Hop: One More Night by Maroon 5	It's So Overt, It's Covert (from Sherlock Holmes (2009 film)) by Hans Zimmer; Irene Adler - The Woman's Theme (from Sherlock (TV series)) by David Arnold
2015–2016	Waltz: Beethoven's Five Secrets by The Piano Guys	In the Mood; Moonlight Serenade by Glenn Miller; Boogie Woogie Bugle Boy performed by the Andrews Sisters
2014–2015	Sway by Luis Demetrio, Pablo Beltrán Ruiz; Calypso Samba by José Abreu	Chambermaid Swing by Parov Stelar; Minnie the Moocher by Cab Calloway; Booty Swing by Parov Stelar

== Competitive highlights ==
=== With Badaoui ===
CS: Challenger Series; JGP: Junior Grand Prix

International
Event	14–15	15–16	16–17	17–18	18–19	19–20
Four Continents		16th	15th	14th	12th	15th
CS Alpen Trophy					12th	
CS Asian Open						10th
CS Autumn Classic						6th
Asian Games			6th			
Lake Placid IDI				14th		
Open d'Andorra		8th				8th
Warsaw Cup					6th	
Winter Universiade					12th	
International: Junior
Junior Worlds		30th	25th			
JGP Austria					10th	
JGP Canada					9th	
JGP Croatia	15th	17th				
JGP Japan	12th		10th			
JGP U.S.		13th				
Lake Placid IDI					9th	
Toruń Cup		9th				
National
Australia			1st		2nd	3rd
Australia, Junior	1st	1st			1st	
J = Junior level; WD = Withdrew

=== With Adderley ===
National
Event	2011–12	2012–13
Australian Champ.	1st J	1st J
