= Andrew Dodds =

Australian figure skater

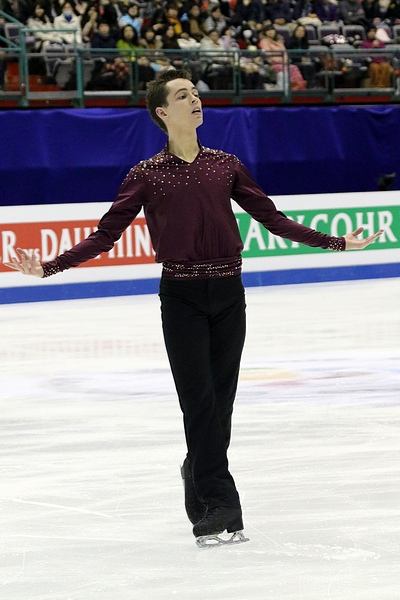

Personal information
- Born: 2 August 1991 (age 35) Gold Coast, Queensland, Australia
- Height: 1.75 m (5 ft 9 in)

Figure skating career
- Country: Australia
- Coach: Singles: Margaret Nicholls; Ice dance: Monica MacDonald, John Dunn
- Skating club: Boondall FSC
- Began skating: 1995

Andrew Dodds (born 2 August 1991) is an Australian figure skater who competes in both men's singles and ice dance. As a single skater, he is a three-time Australian national silver medalist and has competed in the final segment at four Four Continents Championships. As an ice dancer with partner Chantelle Kerry, he is a two-time Australian national champion (2017, 2018) and has appeared at two Four Continents.

== Personal life ==
Andrew Dodds was born on 2 August 1991, in Gold Coast, Queensland. He studied commerce at Griffiths University. He has also studied Japanese. His brothers Matthew Dodds, Ryan Dodds and Jordan Dodds have also represented Australia in figure skating.

== Career ==
=== Single skating ===
Dodds began learning to skate in 1995. He competed at one ISU Junior Grand Prix competition, in September 2010 in Karuizawa, Japan.

Dodds received bronze medals at the New Zealand Winter Games in 2009 and 2011. He won his first senior national medal, bronze, during the 2011–2012 season. His ISU Championship debut came at the 2014 Four Continents in Taipei, Taiwan; his short program placement (27th) did not allow him to compete in the free skate. Similarly, his appearance at the 2015 Four Continents Championships (Seoul, South Korea) ended after the short program, in which he ranked 25th.

During the 2015–2016 season, Dodds became the Australian national silver medalist and competed in the final segment at the 2016 Four Continents Championships in Taipei, finishing 20th. The following season, he took bronze at the Australian Championships and placed 20th at the 2017 Four Continents Championships in Gangneung, South Korea. He was coached by Margaret Nicholls in Gold Coast, Queensland.

=== Ice dancing ===
Dodds had a tryout with Australian single skater Chantelle Kerry in April 2017. They announced their partnership in mid-May, after Dodds had passed his dance tests. The two are coached by Monica MacDonald and John Dunn in Sydney, New South Wales, Australia.

Kerry/Dodds debuted their partnership at the 2017 International Cup of Nice, finishing 16th.

== In popular culture ==
In 2018, Andrew Dodds and Chantelle Kerry appeared in the music video of "Before I Go" by Australian singer Guy Sebastian.

== Programs ==
=== Ice dancing ===
| Season | Rhythm dance | Free dance |
|---|---|---|
| 2019–2020 | Swing: Sweet Transvestite; Jive: Time Warp from The Rocky Horror Picture Show by Richard O'Brien, Richard Hartley | Love Is a Bitch by Two Feet; Never Tear Us Apart by INXS; Love Is a Bitch by Two Feet |
| 2018–2019 | Tango, Blues: Sweet Dreams (Are Made of This); Wachet auf, ruft uns die Stimme, BWV 140 performed by Laurindo Almeida; Night Fever performed by Bee Gees | Enchantress by Two Steps from Hell; 03 - Victory 1 - Extreme Music/Two Steps from Hell by Nick Phoenix / Thomas Bergersen; Your Disco Needs You by Kylie Minogue |
| | Short dance | |
| 2017–2018 | Ain't No Sunshine by Bill Withers; Let's Get Loud by Jennifer Lopez | Ruled by Secrecy by Muse |

=== Single skating ===
| Season | Short program | Free skating |
|---|---|---|
| 2015–2017 | Empty Chairs at Empty Tables by Alain Boublil, Claude-Michel Schönberg | Warsaw Concerto by Richard Addinsell |
| 2014–2015 | Miracle Reunion; Wrath of the White Witch by Joe Hisaishi | Violin Fantasy on Puccini's Turandot by Vanessa-Mae |
| 2013–2014 | Pagliacci by Ruggero Leoncavallo | Violin Fantasy on Puccini's Turandot by Vanessa-Mae |
| 2010–2011 | Standing the Storm by William Joseph | Les Misérables by Claude-Michel Schönberg |

== Competitive highlights ==
CS: Challenger Series; JGP: Junior Grand Prix

=== Ice dancing with Kerry ===
International
| Event | 17–18 | 18–19 | 19–20 | 21–22 |
|---|---|---|---|---|
| Worlds | 30th | 26th | | |
| Four Continents | 13th | 10th | 14th | WD |
| CS Alpen Trophy | | 11th | | |
| CS Asian Open | | 4th | WD | |
| CS Finlandia Trophy | | | | 14th |
| CS Lombardia Trophy | | | | WD |
| CS Warsaw Cup | 13th | | 12th | |
| Cup of Nice | 16th | | | |
| Mezzaluna Cup | | | | 2nd |
| Lake Placid IDI | | | | 9th |
| Open d'Andorra | | | 4th | 4th |
| Toruń Cup | | | 14th | |
| U.S. Classic | | | | 6th |
| Warsaw Cup | | 5th | | |
National
| Australian Champ. | 1st | 1st | 2nd | C |
TBD = Assigned; C = Event cancelled

=== Men's singles ===
International
| Event | 07–08 | 08–09 | 09–10 | 10–11 | 11–12 | 12–13 | 13–14 | 14–15 | 15–16 | 16–17 | 17–18 | 18–19 | 19–20 |
|---|---|---|---|---|---|---|---|---|---|---|---|---|---|
| Four Continents | | | | | | | 27th | 25th | 20th | 20th | 21st | 13th | |
| CS Autumn Classic | | | | | | | | | | 13th | 10th | 10th | |
| CS Ice Challenge | | | | | | | | 13th | | | | | |
| CS Lombardia | | | | | | | | 12th | | | | WD | |
| CS Nebelhorn | | | | | | | | 14th | 14th | | | | |
| CS Ondrej Nepela | | | | | | | | | 8th | | | WD | |
| CS U.S. Classic | | | | | | | | | 9th | 11th | 13th | 9th | |
| Asian Open | | | | | | | | | | 8th | 9th | | |
| Bosphorus Cup | | | | | 12th | | | | | | | | |
| Crystal Skate | | | | | | 7th | | | | | | | |
| Cup of Nice | | | | | 23rd | 25th | 18th | | | | | | |
| Golden Spin | | | | | | 12th | | | | | | | |
| Istanbul Cup | | | | | 12th | | | | | | | | |
| NZ Winter Games | | | 3rd | | 3rd | | | | | | | | |
| Skate Down Under | | | | | | | 6th | | | | | | |
| Winter Universiade | | | | | | | 24th | | | | | | |
| Volvo Open Cup | | | | | | 11th | | | | 11th | | | |
| Warsaw Cup | | | | | | | | | | | | 3rd | |
International: Junior
| JGP Japan | | | | 20th | | | | | | | | | |
National
| Australian Champ. | | | 7th | 5th | 3rd | 5th | 4th | 3rd | 2nd | 3rd | 2nd | 2nd | 4th |
| Australian Junior Champ. | 6th J | 6th J | 4th J | | | | | | | | | | |
N = Novice; J = Junior level; WD = Withdrew
