= Monica MacDonald =

Australian figure skater and coach

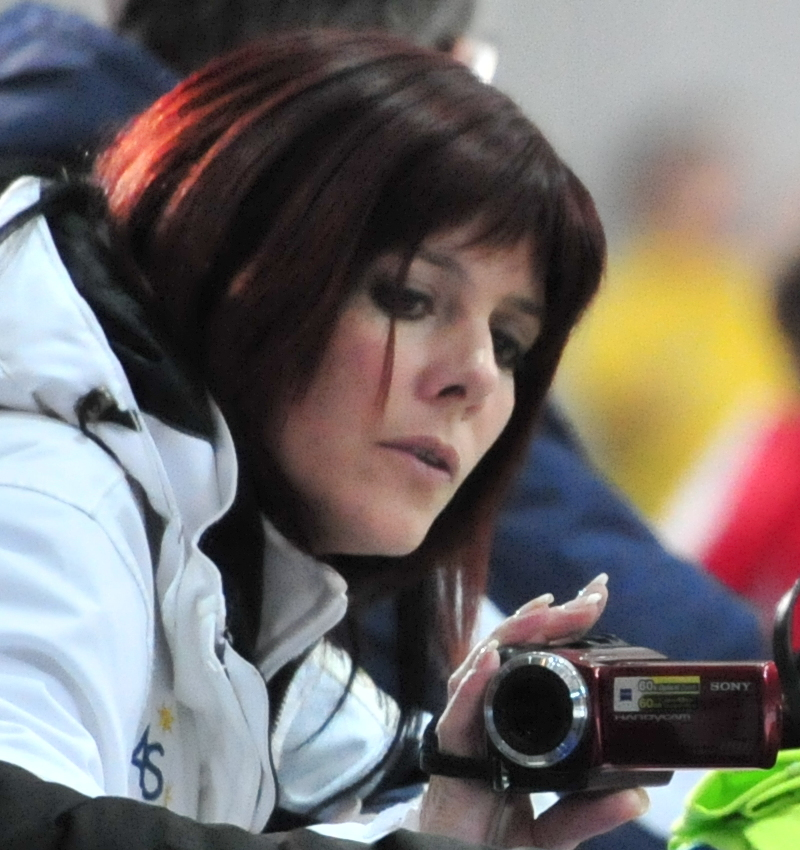

Personal information
- Born: 5 May 1967 (age 59)
- Home town: Sydney, Australia

Figure skating career
- Country: Australia
- Partner: Rodney Clarke, Duncan Smart
- Coach: Barbara Clarke
- Retired: 1992

Monica MacDonald (born 5 May 1967) is an Australian figure skating coach and former competitor in ice dancing. With Rodney Clarke, she became a four-time Australian national champion (1986–1989) and placed 20th at the 1988 Winter Olympics. She later won three national titles with Duncan Smart (1990–1992).

== Personal life ==
MacDonald was born on 5 May 1967. She is the mother of Brendan Kerry, who competed in men's singles at the 2014 and 2018 Winter Olympics, and of Chantelle Kerry, who competed in ladies' singles at the 2012 Winter Youth Olympics. She also has a third child, Alex MacDonald-Yan.

== Career ==
MacDonald began learning to skate at Homebush Ice Rink in Australia and, when she was almost 12 years old, became a student of Barbara Clarke. With Rodney Clarke, MacDonald won four consecutive national titles, beginning in 1985. The duo competed at the 1988 Winter Olympics, finishing in 20th place, and at three World Championships. They were the first Australian ice dancers to medal in an international event, taking bronze in Olomouc.

In 1989, MacDonald teamed up with Duncan Smart. The duo won the next three national titles and competed at four World Championships, from 1989 to 1992.

She retired from competition around 1992 and became a coach, working with singles and ice dancers. She is based at Macquarie Ice Rink in Sydney, Australia. She has coached:

- Brendan Kerry
- Chantelle Kerry
- Danielle O'Brien / Gregory Merriman
- Chantelle Kerry / Andrew Dodds
- Matilda Friend / William Badaoui

She is also an ISU Technical Specialist.

== Competitive highlights ==
=== With Clarke ===
International
| Event | 85–86 | 86–87 | 87–88 | 88–89 |
|---|---|---|---|---|
| Olympics | | | 20th | |
| Worlds | 19th | 19th | 22nd | |
National
| Australian Champ. | 1st | 1st | 1st | 1st |

=== With Smart ===
International
| Event | 88–89 | 89–90 | 90–91 | 91–92 |
|---|---|---|---|---|
| Worlds | 20th | 25th | 23rd | 24th |
National
| Australian Champ. | | 1st | 1st | 1st |
