= Rodney Clarke =

Australian former ice dancer

Rodney Clarke is an Australian former ice dancer. He was a four times Senior Australian Ice Dance champion at the Australian Figure Skating Championships.

With partner Monica MacDonald, Clarke won a junior national title and four consecutive senior national titles, beginning in 1984. The duo competed at the 1988 Winter Olympic Games, finishing in last place out of twenty couples.

== Competitive highlights ==
with MacDonald

Event	1985	1986	1987	1988
Winter Olympics			20th	
World Championships	19th	19th	22nd	
Australian Championships	1st	1st	1st	1st
