= Warsaw Cup =

International figure skating competition

- Status: Active
- Genre: ISU Challenger Series
- Frequency: Annual
- Venue: Arena COS Torwar
- Location: Warsaw
- Country: Poland
- Inaugurated: 2002
- Previous event: 2025 Warsaw Cup
- Next event: 2026 Warsaw Cup
- Organizer: Polish Figure Skating Association

The Warsaw Cup is an annual figure skating competition sanctioned by the International Skating Union (ISU), organized and hosted by the Polish Figure Skating Association (Polish: Polski Związek Łyżwiarstwa Figurowego) at the Arena COS Torwar in Warsaw, Poland. The Warsaw Cup debuted in 2002 as a junior-level competition. A pairs event for senior-level skaters was added in 2010, men's and women's in 2012, and ice dance in 2014. When the ISU launched the ISU Challenger Series in 2014, the Warsaw Cup was one of the inaugural competitions, and it has been a Challenger Series almost every year since. Medals are awarded in men's singles, women's singles, pair skating, and ice dance; and when the event is part of the Challenger Series, skaters earn points towards the World Standings and Season's World Ranking based on their results.

Alexander Majorov of Sweden and Vladimir Samoilov of Poland are tied for winning the most Warsaw Cup titles in men's singles (with two each), while Ekaterina Kurakova of Poland holds the record in women's singles (with three). Valentina Marchei and Ondřej Hotárek of Italy, and Anastasiia Metelkina and Luka Berulava of Georgia, are tied for winning the most titles in pair skating (with two each), while Evgeniia Lopareva and Geoffrey Brissaud of France hold the record in ice dance (with three).

== History ==
The inaugural edition of the Warsaw Cup was held in 2002 and consisted only of the men's and women's events at the junior level. The Warsaw Cup was exclusively a junior-level competition until 2010, when a senior-level pairs event was added. Men's and women's events at the senior level were added in 2012.

The ISU Challenger Series was introduced in 2014. It is a series of international figure skating competitions sanctioned by the International Skating Union and organized by ISU member nations. The objective is to ensure consistent organization and structure within a series of international competitions linked together, providing opportunities for senior-level skaters to compete at the international level and also earn points towards the World Standings and Season's World Ranking. When an event is held as part of the Challenger Series, it must host at least three of the four disciplines (men's singles, women's singles, pair skating, and ice dance) and representatives from at least ten different ISU member nations. The minimum number of entrants required for each discipline is eight skaters each in men's singles and women's singles, five teams in pair skating, and six teams in ice dance. Each ISU member nation is eligible to enter up to three skaters or teams per discipline in each competition, although the Polish Figure Skating Association may enter an unlimited number of entrants in their own event.

When the Warsaw Cup became a Challenger Series event in 2014, it marked the end of its junior-level competitions. Ice dance at the senior level was also added in 2014 to coincide with the competition's new Challenger Series status. The Warsaw Cup was a Challenger Series event from 2014 to 2017. The Warsaw Cup was held in 2018, but not as part of the Challenger Series, and junior-level competitions in the men's and women's events, and ice dance, made a one-time reappearance. The Warsaw Cup returned to the Challenger Series in 2019, but no competition was held in 2020 due to the COVID-19 pandemic. The competition returned in 2021 and has been a Challenger Series event ever since. The 2026 Warsaw Cup is scheduled to be held from 25 to 29 November.

== Senior medalists ==
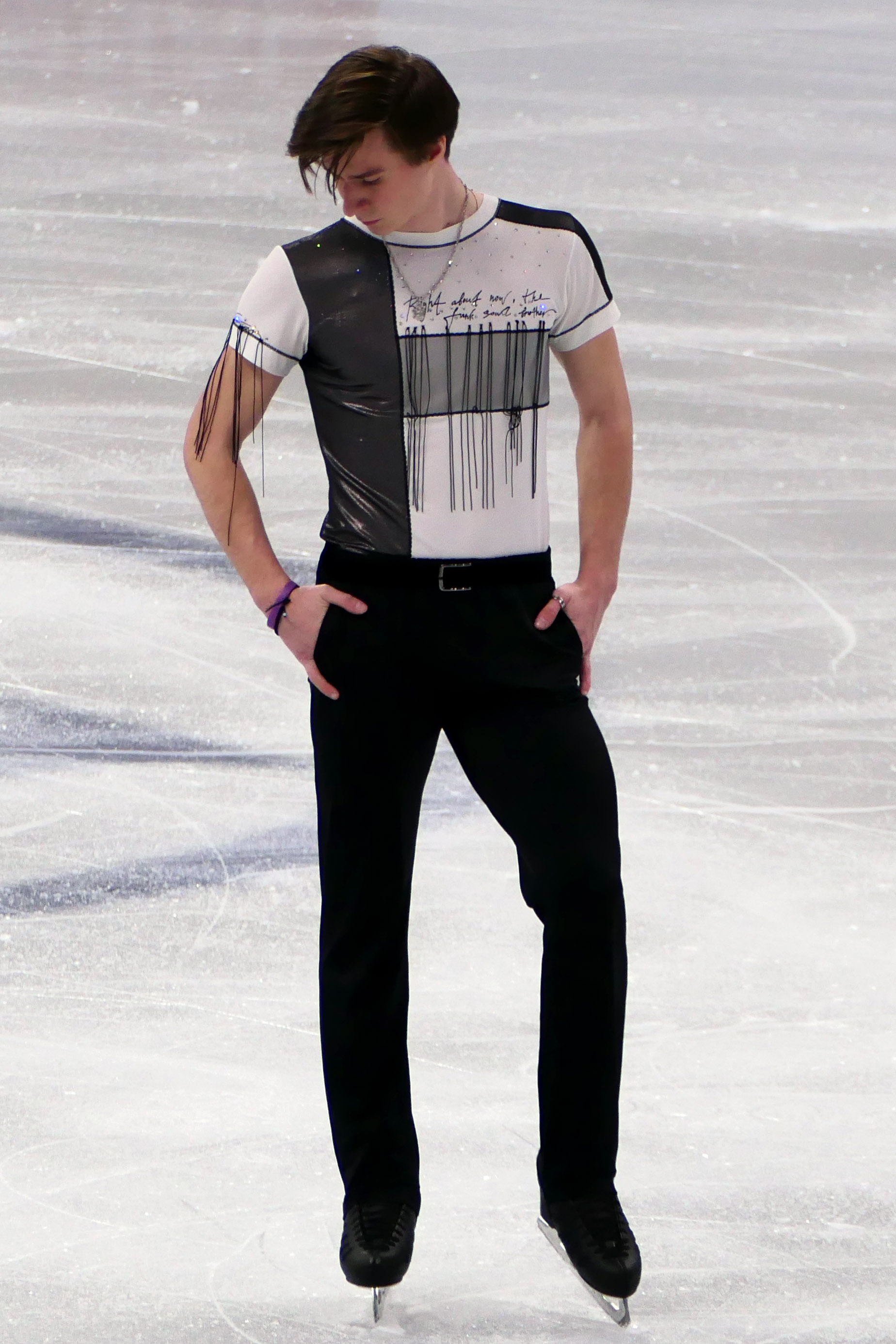
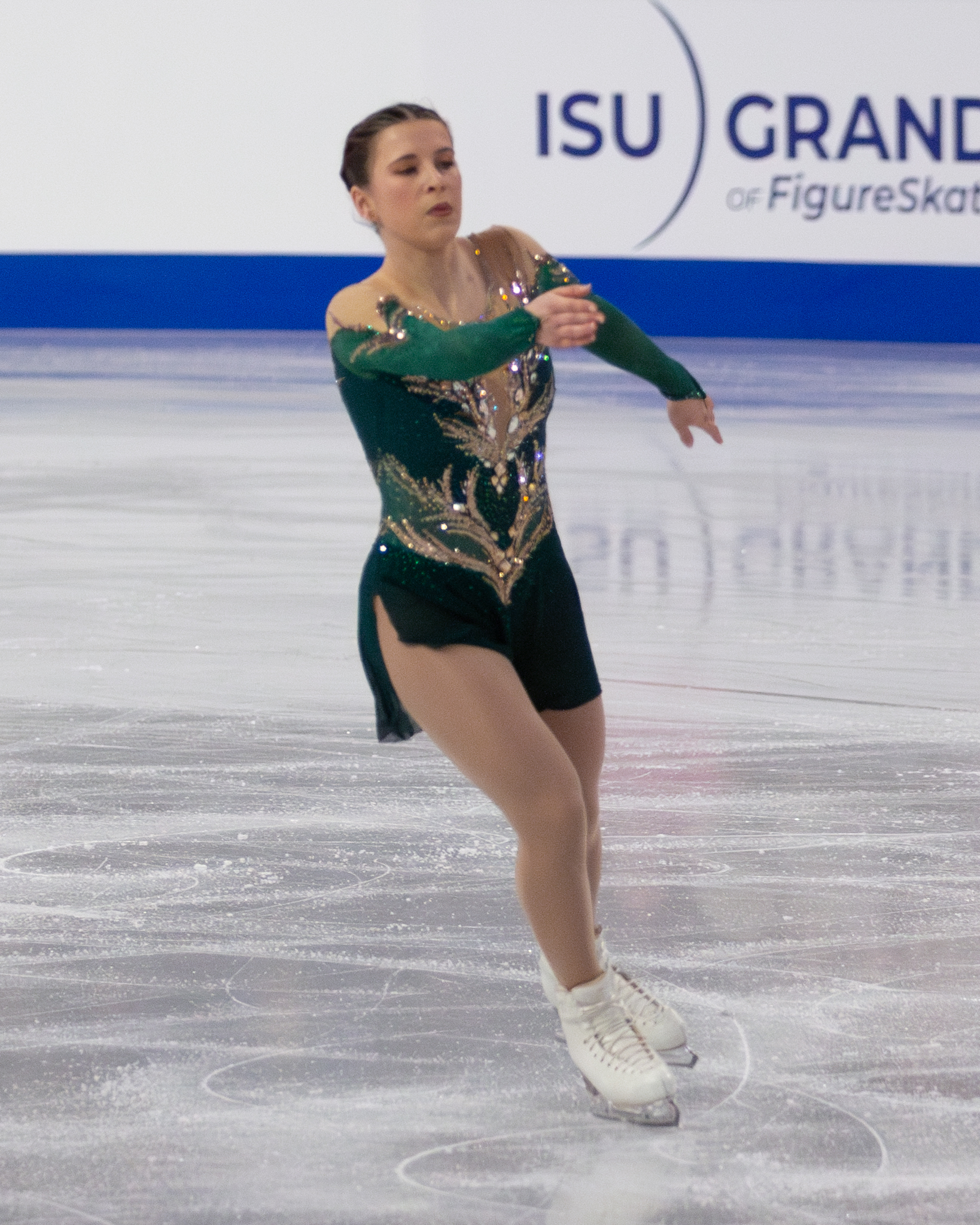
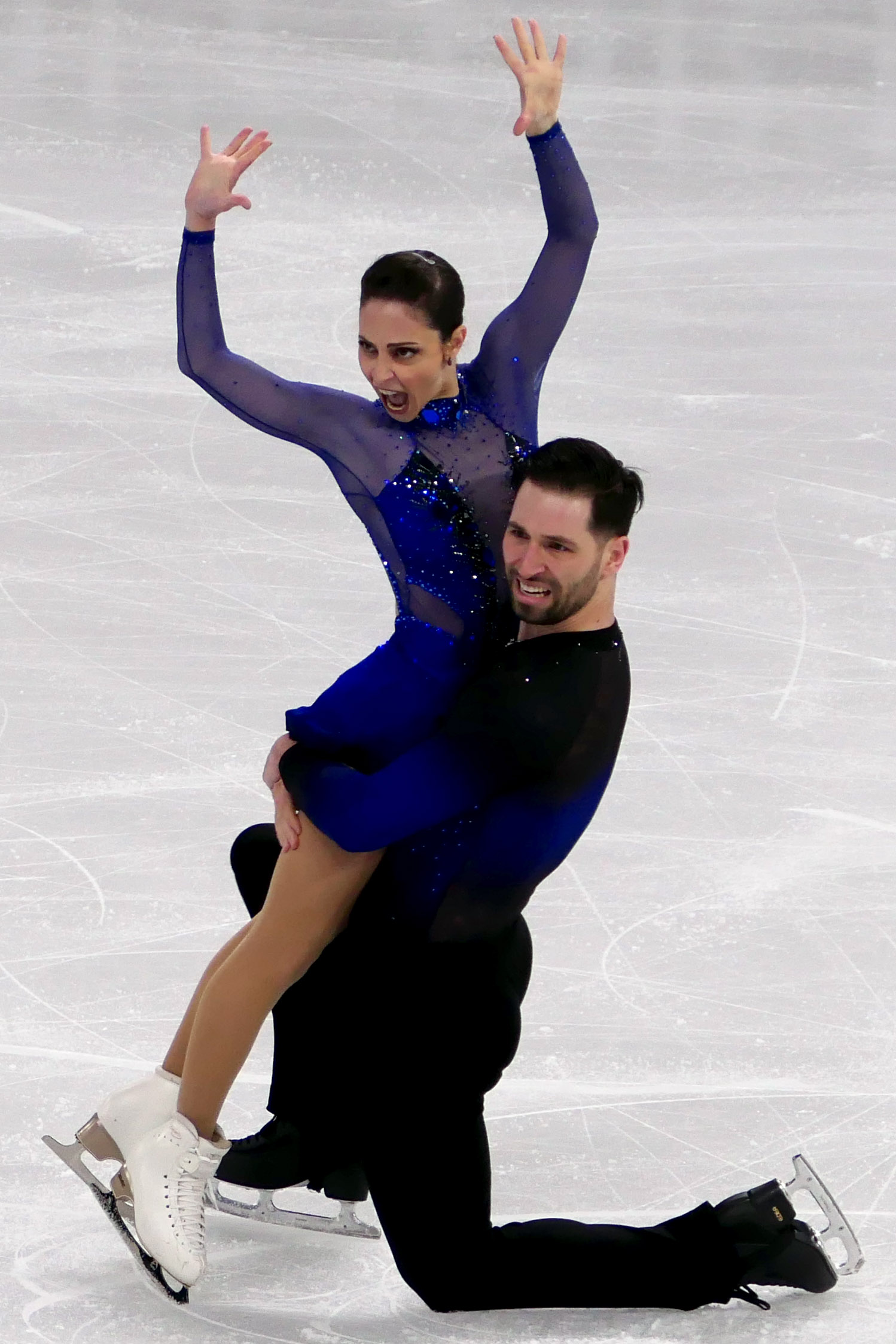
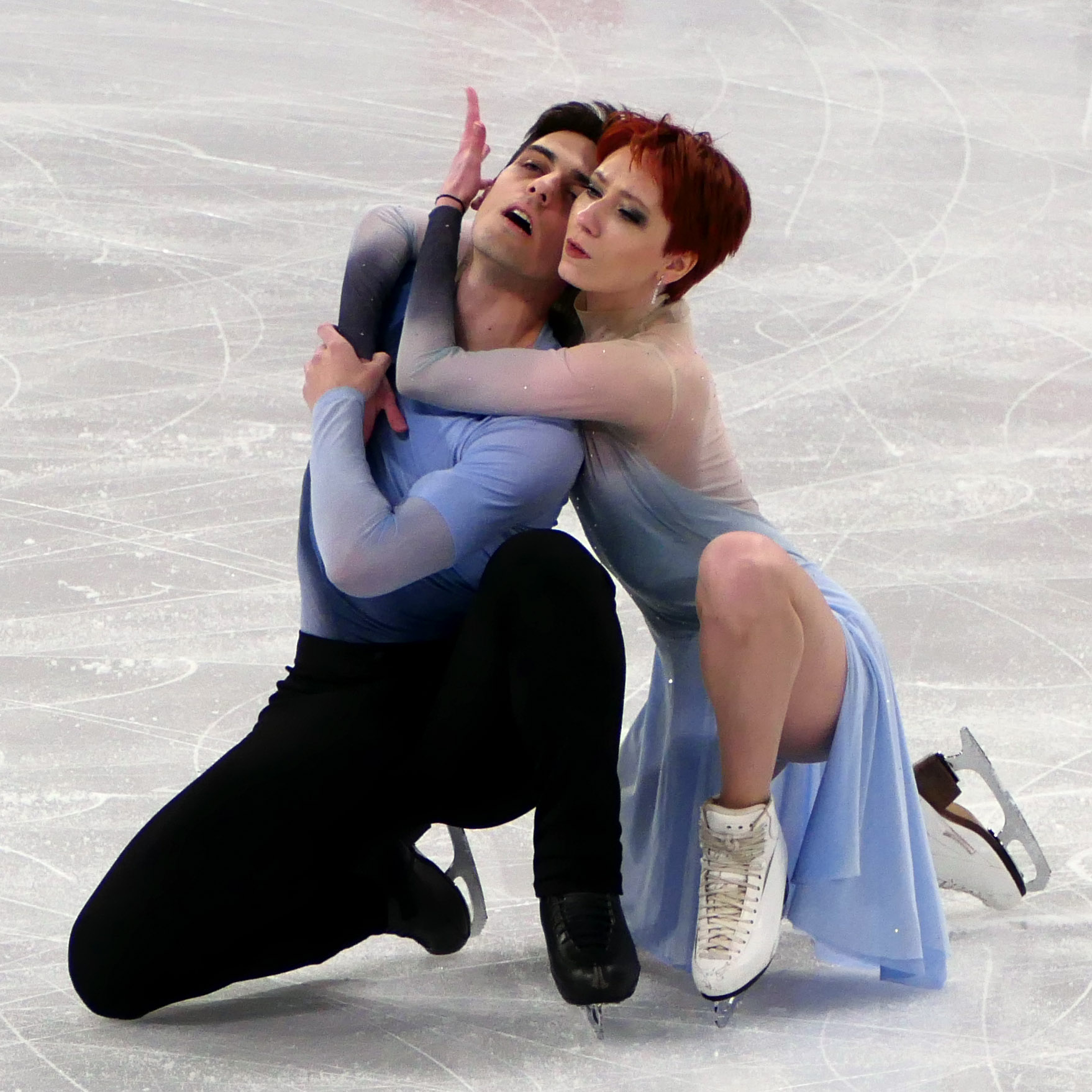
The 2025 Warsaw Cup champions (from left to right): Vladimir Samoilov of Poland (men's singles); Sara-Maude Dupuis of Canada (women's singles); Deanna Stellato-Dudek and Maxime Deschamps of Canada (pair skating); and Evgeniia Lopareva and Geoffrey Brissaud of France (ice dance)

CS: Challenger Series event

=== Men's singles ===
Senior men's event medalists
Year	Gold	Silver	Bronze	Ref.
No men's competitors prior to 2012
2012	(Sweden) Alexander Majorov	(Uzbekistan) Misha Ge	(Poland) Maciej Cieplucha	
2013	(Switzerland) Stéphane Walker	(Belgium) Jorik Hendrickx	(Poland) Maciej Cieplucha	
2014 CS	(Russia) Alexander Petrov	(Philippines) Michael Christian Martinez	(Italy) Matteo Rizzo	
2015 CS	(Russia) Alexander Samarin	(Russia) Anton Shulepov	(Russia) Zhan Bush	
2016 CS	(Sweden) Alexander Majorov	(Russia) Dmitri Aliev	(Switzerland) Stéphane Walker	
2017 CS	(Italy) Matteo Rizzo	(Switzerland) Stéphane Walker	(Canada) Liam Firus	
2018	(Italy) Daniel Grassl	(Chinese Taipei) Tsao Chih-i	(Australia) Andrew Dodds	
2019 CS	(Russia) Andrei Mozalev	(Russia) Petr Gumennik	(South Korea) Lee June-hyoung	
2020	Competition cancelled due to the COVID-19 pandemic			
2021 CS	(Japan) Sōta Yamamoto	(Italy) Daniel Grassl	(Russia) Petr Gumennik	
2022 CS	(France) Kévin Aymoz	(Italy) Daniel Grassl	(Switzerland) Lukas Britschgi	
2023 CS	(Switzerland) Lukas Britschgi	(Israel) Mark Gorodnitsky	(United States) Jason Brown	
2024 CS	(Poland) Vladimir Samoilov	(Italy) Gabriele Frangipani	(Ukraine) Ivan Shmuratko	
2025 CS	(Poland) Vladimir Samoilov	(Switzerland) Lukas Britschgi	(France) Samy Hammi	
2026 CS				

=== Women's singles ===
Senior women's event medalists
Year	Gold	Silver	Bronze	Ref.
No women's competitors prior to 2012
2012	(Sweden) Isabelle Olsson	(Ukraine) Natalia Popova	(Germany) Sandy Hoffmann	
2013	(Poland) Agata Kryger	(Norway) Camilla Gjersem	(Czech Republic) Elizaveta Ukolova	
2014 CS	(Russia) Elizaveta Tuktamysheva	(Armenia) Anastasiya Galustyan	(Lithuania) Aleksandra Golovkina	
2015 CS	(Russia) Elizaveta Tuktamysheva	(Russia) Serafima Sakhanovich	(Armenia) Anastasiya Galustyan	
2016 CS	(Germany) Nicole Schott	(Australia) Kailani Craine	(Russia) Alexandra Avstriyskaya	
2017 CS	(Russia) Serafima Sakhanovich	(Russia) Stanislava Konstantinova	(United States) Courtney Hicks	
2018	(Russia) Anastasia Gulyakova	(Australia) Kailani Craine	(Poland) Elżbieta Gabryszak	
2019 CS	(Poland) Ekaterina Kurakova	(United States) Bradie Tennell	(Russia) Elizaveta Nugumanova	
2020	Competition cancelled due to the COVID-19 pandemic			
2021 CS	(Russia) Maya Khromykh	(Estonia) Niina Petrõkina	(Poland) Ekaterina Kurakova	
2022 CS	(Poland) Ekaterina Kurakova	(Switzerland) Sarina Joos	(Finland) Janna Jyrkinen	
2023 CS	(Poland) Ekaterina Kurakova	(Italy) Anna Pezzetta	(United States) Elyce Lin-Gracey	
2024 CS	(Canada) Katherine Medland Spence	(Poland) Ekaterina Kurakova	(Italy) Marina Piredda	
2025 CS	(Canada) Sara-Maude Dupuis	(Italy) Marina Piredda	(Norway) Mia Risa Gomez	
2026 CS				

=== Pairs ===
Senior pairs event medalists
Year	Gold	Silver	Bronze	Ref.
2010	(Germany); Mari Vartmann; Aaron Van Cleave	(Germany); Katharina Gierok; Florian Just	(Czech Republic); Alexandra Herbríková; Alexandr Zaboev	
2011	(Russia); Anastasia Martiusheva; Alexei Rogonov	(Belarus); Lubov Bakirova; Mikalai Kamianchuk	No other competitors	
2012	(Russia); Evgenia Tarasova; Vladimir Morozov	(Belarus); Maria Paliakova; Nikita Bochkov	(Ukraine); Alexandra Gorovaya; Sergei Deynega	
2013	(Russia); Ksenia Stolbova; Fedor Klimov	(Russia); Lina Fedorova; Maxim Miroshkin	(Belarus); Maria Paliakova; Nikita Bochkov	
2014 CS	(Canada); Liubov Ilyushechkina; Dylan Moscovitch	(Russia); Lina Fedorova; Maxim Miroshkin	(Italy); Valentina Marchei; Ondřej Hotárek	
2015 CS	(Germany); Aljona Savchenko; Bruno Massot	(Italy); Nicole Della Monica; Matteo Guarise	(Lithuania); Goda Butkutė; Nikita Ermolaev	
2016 CS	(Italy); Valentina Marchei; Ondřej Hotárek	(United States); Chelsea Liu; Brian Johnson	(Germany); Minerva Fabienne Hase; Nolan Seegert	
2017 CS	(Italy); Valentina Marchei; Ondřej Hotárek	(Russia); Aleksandra Boikova; Dmitrii Kozlovskii	(Germany); Minerva Fabienne Hase; Nolan Seegert	
2018	No pairs competitors			
2019 CS	(United States); Jessica Calalang; Brian Johnson	(Russia); Alina Pepeleva; Roman Pleshkov	(Canada); Justine Brasseur; Mark Bardei	
2020	Competition cancelled due to the COVID-19 pandemic			
2021 CS	(Russia); Evgenia Tarasova; Vladimir Morozov	(United States); Jessica Calalang; Brian Johnson	(Russia); Yasmina Kadyrova; Ivan Balchenko	
2022 CS	(Australia); Anastasia Golubeva; Hektor Giotopoulos Moore	(Italy); Rebecca Ghilardi; Filippo Ambrosini	(Germany); Letizia Roscher; Luis Schuster	
2023	(Georgia (country)); Anastasiia Metelkina; Luka Berulava	(United Kingdom); Anastasia Vaipan-Law; Luke Digby	(Poland); Ioulia Chtchetinina; Michał Woźniak	
2024 CS	(Georgia (country)); Anastasiia Metelkina; Luka Berulava	(United Kingdom); Anastasia Vaipan-Law; Luke Digby	(Canada); Fiona Bombardier; Benjamin Mimar	
2025	(Canada); Deanna Stellato-Dudek; Maxime Deschamps	(United Kingdom); Anastasia Vaipan-Law; Luke Digby	(United States); Katie McBeath; Daniil Parkman	
2026 CS				

=== Ice dance ===
Senior ice dance event medalists
Year	Gold	Silver	Bronze	Ref.
No ice dance competitions prior to 2014
2014 CS	(Slovakia); Federica Testa; Lukáš Csölley	(Ukraine); Oleksandra Nazarova; Maksym Nikitin	(China); Wang Shiyue; Liu Xinyu	
2015 CS	(Italy); Charlène Guignard; Marco Fabbri	(Poland); Natalia Kaliszek; Maksym Spodyriev	(Finland); Cecilia Törn; Jussiville Partanen	
2016 CS	(Russia); Ekaterina Bobrova; Dmitri Soloviev	(Russia); Tiffany Zahorski; Jonathan Guerreiro	(Slovakia); Lucie Myslivečková; Lukáš Csölley	
2017 CS	(Russia); Betina Popova; Sergey Mozgov	(United States); Lorraine McNamara; Quinn Carpenter	(Ukraine); Oleksandra Nazarova; Maksym Nikitin	
2018	(Russia); Tiffany Zahorski; Jonathan Guerreiro	(Poland); Natalia Kaliszek; Maksym Spodyriev	(Finland); Juulia Turkkila; Matthias Versluis	
2019 CS	(France); Marie-Jade Lauriault; Romain Le Gac	(Russia); Ksenia Konkina; Pavel Drozd	(United States); Caroline Green; Michael Parsons	
2020	Competition cancelled due to the COVID-19 pandemic			
2021 CS	(Russia); Diana Davis; Gleb Smolkin	(Japan); Kana Muramoto; Daisuke Takahashi	(United States); Caroline Green; Michael Parsons	
2022 CS	(France); Loïcia Demougeot; Théo le Mercier	(Germany); Jennifer Janse van Rensburg; Benjamin Steffan	(France); Marie Dupayage; Thomas Nabais	
2023 CS	(France); Evgeniia Lopareva; Geoffrey Brissaud	(South Korea); Hannah Lim; Ye Quan	(France); Marie Dupayage; Thomas Nabais	
2024 CS	(France); Evgeniia Lopareva; Geoffrey Brissaud	(United States); Emilea Zingas; Vadym Kolesnik	(South Korea); Hannah Lim; Ye Quan	
2025 CS	(France); Evgeniia Lopareva; Geoffrey Brissaud	(South Korea); Hannah Lim; Ye Quan	(United States); Caroline Green; Michael Parsons	
2026 CS				

== Junior medalists ==
=== Men's singles ===
Junior men's event medalists
Year	Gold	Silver	Bronze	Ref.
2010	(Belarus) Vitali Luchanok	(Poland) Edwin Siwkowski	(Poland) Kamil Białas	
2011	(United Kingdom) Harry Mattick	(Belarus) Alexei Mialionkhin	(Poland) Kamil Dymowski	
2012	(Germany) Panagiotis Polizoakis	(Norway) Sondre Oddvoll Bøe	(Germany) Alexander Bjelde	
2013	(Norway) Sondre Oddvoll Bøe	(Poland) Krzysztof Gała	(Italy) Marco Pauletti	
2014–17	No junior-level competitions held			
2018	(Russia) Gleb Lutfullin	(France) Xan Rols	(France) Vincent Mimault	
No junior-level competitions since 2018

=== Women's singles ===
Junior women's event medalists
Year	Gold	Silver	Bronze	Ref.
2010	(Norway) Céline Mysen	(Norway) Camilla Gjersem	(Lithuania) Rimgailė Meškaitė	
2011	(Germany) Nicole Schott	(Austria) Sabrina Schulz	(Norway) Camilla Gjersem	
2012	(Germany) Annabelle Prölß	(France) Carla Monzali	(Denmark) Pernille Sorensen	
2013	(Lithuania) Deimantė Kizalaitė	(Germany) Lea Johanna Dastich	(Switzerland) Matilde Gianocca	
2014–17	No junior-level competitions held			
2018	(Italy) Lucrezia Beccari	(Chinese Taipei) Mandy Chiang	(Hong Kong) Cheuk Ka Kahlen Cheung	
No junior-level competitions since 2018

=== Pairs ===
Junior pairs event medalists
Year	Gold	Silver	Bronze	Ref.
2010	(Poland); Magdalena Klatka; Radosław Chruściński	(Poland); Anna Siedlecka; Jakub Tyc	(Poland); Magdalena Jaskółka; Piotr Snopek	
2011	(Russia); Valeria Grechukhina; Andrei Filonov	(Russia); Ekaterina Krutskikh; Vladimir Morozov	(Russia); Kamilla Gainetdinova; Ivan Bich	
2012	(Russia); Lina Fedorova; Maxim Miroshkin	(Germany); Annabelle Prölß; Ruben Blommaert	(Russia); Arina Cherniavskaia; Antonio Souza-Kordeiru	
2013	(Russia); Maria Vigalova; Egor Zakroev	(Russia); Anastasia Kholkina; Vladimir Arkhipov	(Germany); Julia Linckh; Konrad Hocker Scholler	
No junior-level competitions since 2013

=== Ice dance ===
Junior ice dance event medalists
Year	Gold	Silver	Bronze	Ref.
No junior ice dance competitions prior to 2018
2018	(Russia); Polina Ivanenko; Daniil Karpov	(Ukraine); Mariia Holubtsova; Kyryl Bielobrov	(Russia); Eva Kuts; Dmitrii Mikhailov	
No junior-level competitions since 2018

== Records ==
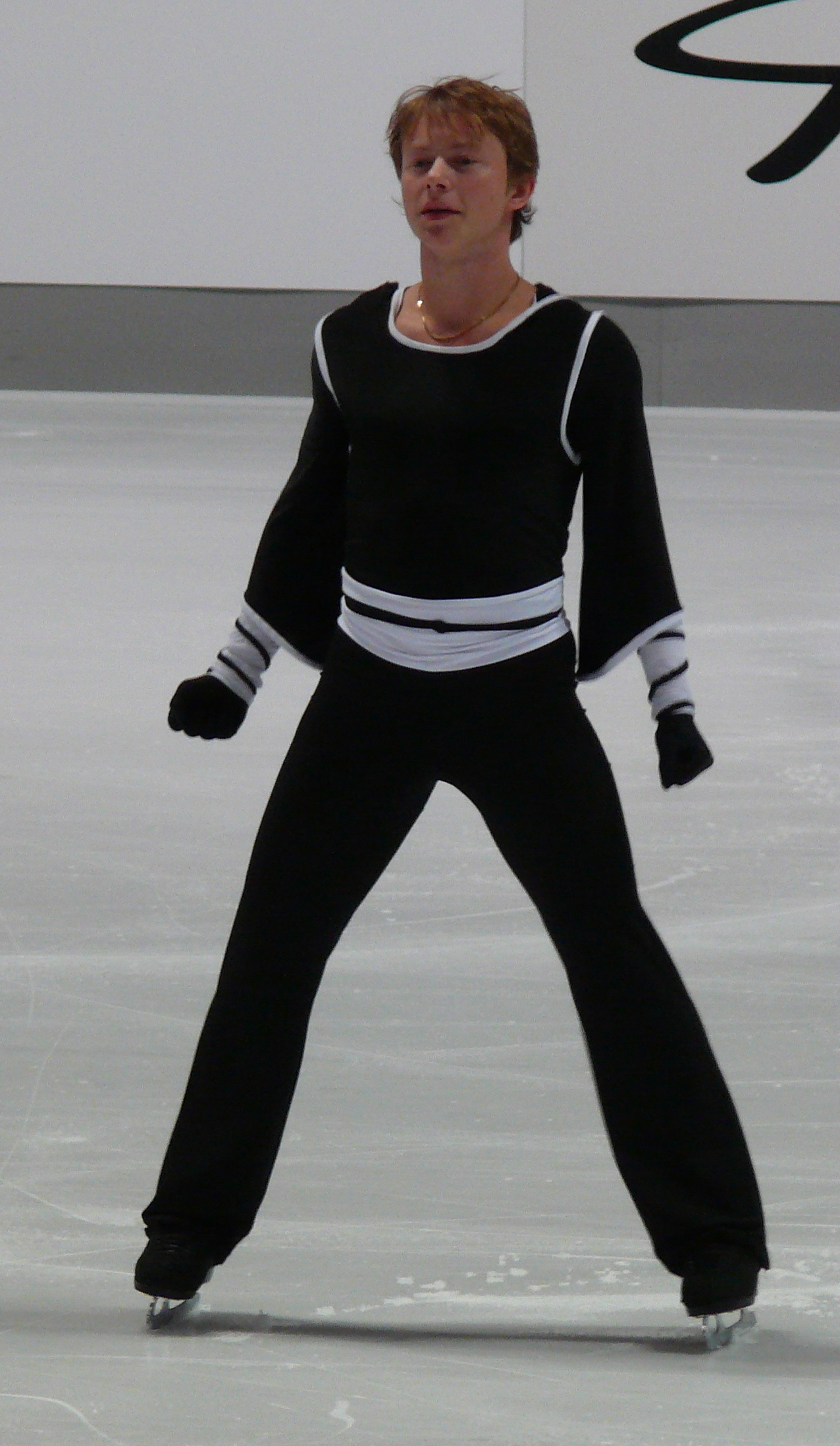
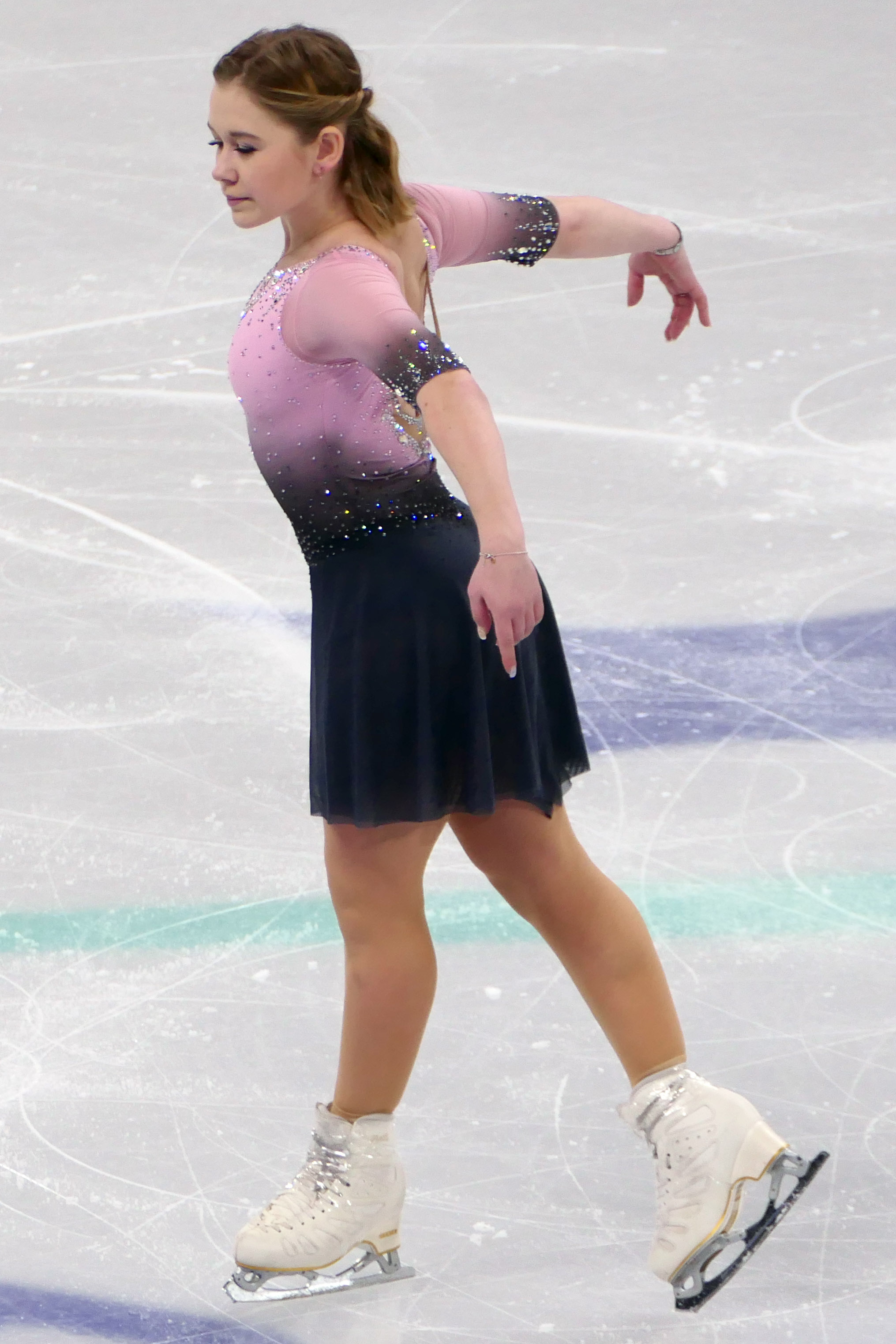
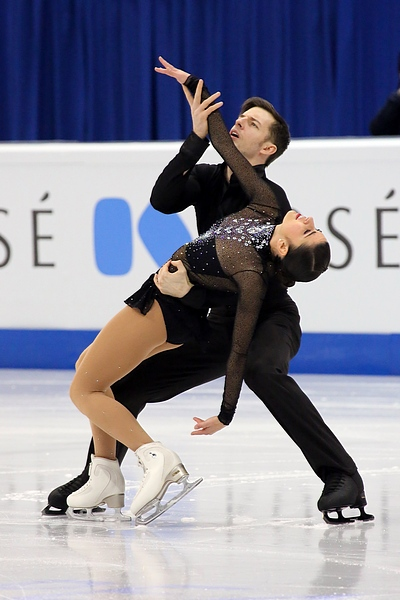
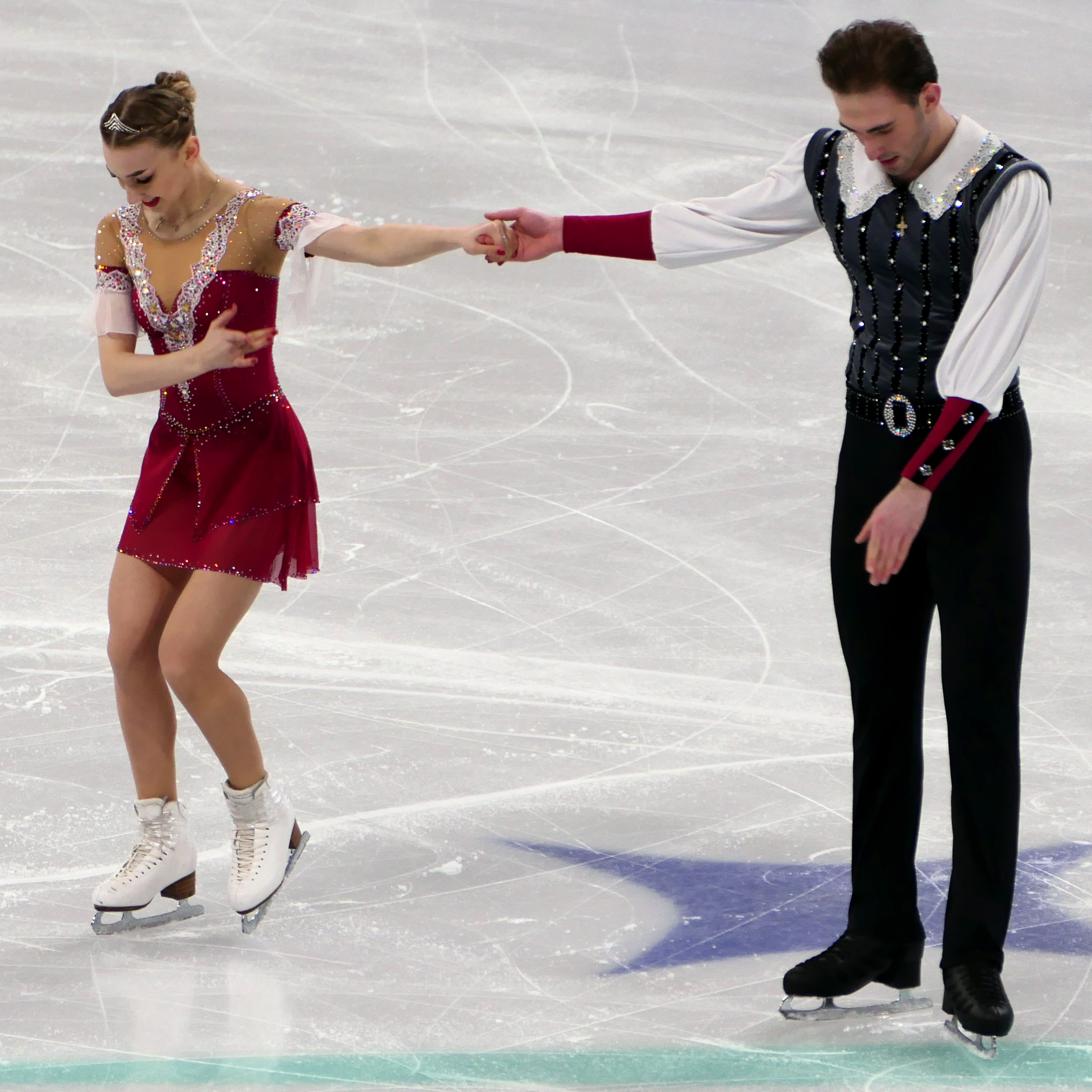
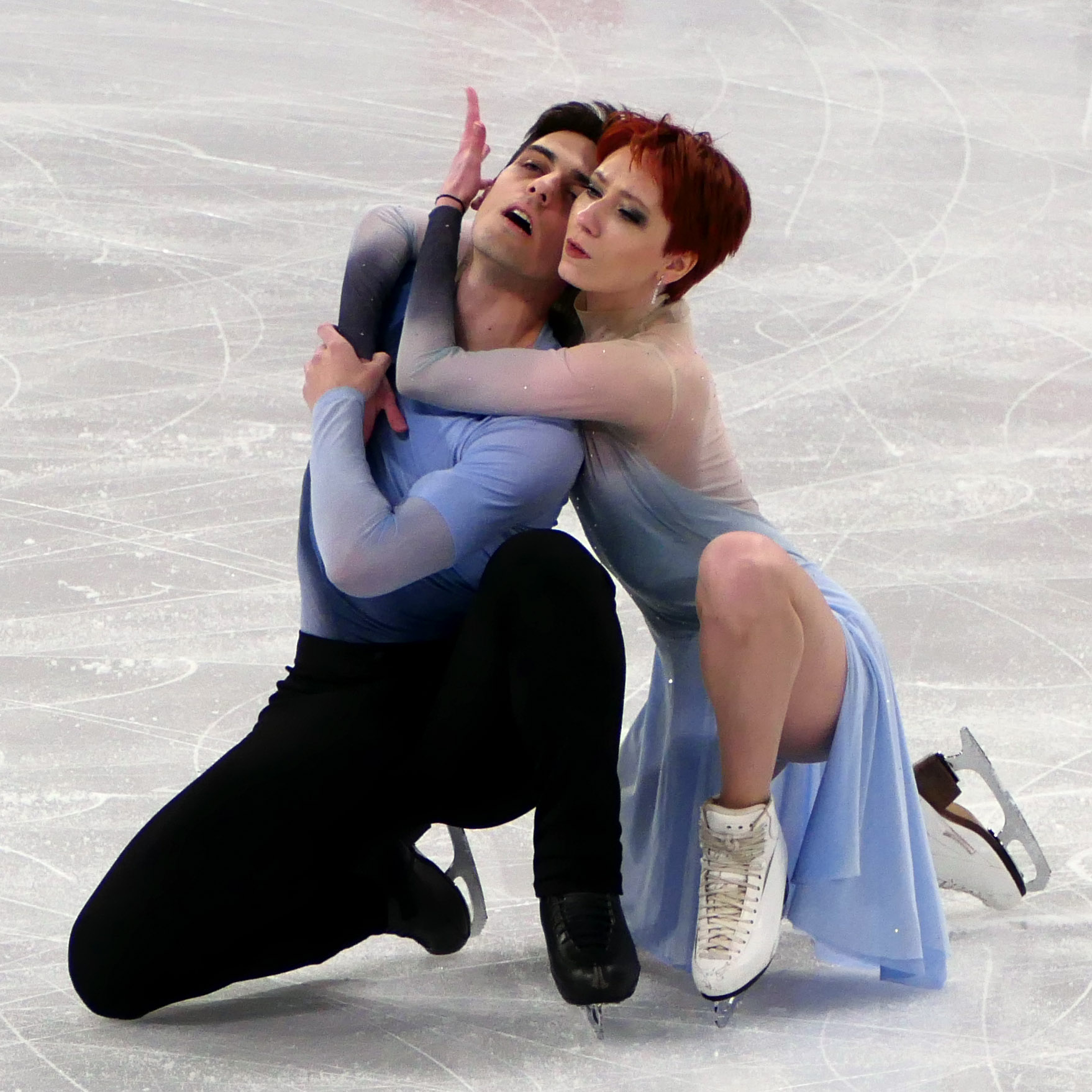
From left to right: Alexander Majorov of Sweden won two Warsaw Cup titles in men's singles; Ekaterina Kurakova of Poland has won three Warsaw Cup titles in women's singles; Valentina Marchei and Ondřej Hotárek of Italy, and Anastasiia Metelkina and Luka Berulava of Georgia, have each won two Warsaw Cup titles in pair skating; and Evgeniia Lopareva and Geoffrey Brissaud of France have won two Warsaw Cup titles in ice dance.

Records
Discipline	Most titles			
Discipline	Skater(s)	No.	Years	Ref.
Men's singles	(Sweden); Alexander Majorov	2	2012; 2016	
Men's singles	(Poland); Vladimir Samoilov	2	2024–25	
Women's singles	(Poland); Ekaterina Kurakova	3	2019; 2022–23	
Pairs	(Italy); Valentina Marchei; Ondřej Hotárek	2	2016–17	
Pairs	(Georgia (country)); Anastasiia Metelkina; Luka Berulava	2	2023–24	
Ice dance	(France); Evgeniia Lopareva; Geoffrey Brissaud	3	2023–25	

== Cumulative medal count (senior medalists) ==
=== Men's singles ===
Total number of Warsaw Cup medals in men's singles by nation
Rank	Nation	Gold	Silver	Bronze	Total
1	Russia	3	3	2	8
2	Italy	2	3	1	6
3	Switzerland	2	2	2	6
4	Poland	2	0	2	4
5	Sweden	2	0	0	2
6	France	1	0	1	2
7	Japan	1	0	0	1
8	Belgium	0	1	0	1
8	Chinese Taipei	0	1	0	1
8	Israel	0	1	0	1
8	Philippines	0	1	0	1
8	Uzbekistan	0	1	0	1
13	Australia	0	0	1	1
13	Canada	0	0	1	1
13	South Korea	0	0	1	1
13	Ukraine	0	0	1	1
13	United States	0	0	1	1
Totals (17 entries)		13	13	13	39

=== Women's singles ===
Total number of Warsaw Cup medals in women's singles by nation
Rank	Nation	Gold	Silver	Bronze	Total
1	Russia	5	2	2	9
2	Poland	4	1	2	7
3	Canada	2	0	0	2
4	Germany	1	0	1	2
5	Sweden	1	0	0	1
6	Italy	0	2	1	3
7	Australia	0	2	0	2
8	United States	0	1	2	3
9	Armenia	0	1	1	2
9	Norway	0	1	1	2
11	Estonia	0	1	0	1
11	Switzerland	0	1	0	1
11	Ukraine	0	1	0	1
14	Czech Republic	0	0	1	1
14	Finland	0	0	1	1
14	Lithuania	0	0	1	1
Totals (16 entries)		13	13	13	39

=== Pairs ===
Total number of Warsaw Cup medals in pairs by nation
Rank	Nation	Gold	Silver	Bronze	Total
1	Russia	4	4	1	9
2	Italy	2	2	1	5
3	Germany	2	1	3	6
4	Canada	2	0	2	4
5	Georgia	2	0	0	2
6	United States	1	2	1	4
7	Australia	1	0	0	1
8	Great Britain	0	3	0	3
9	Belarus	0	2	1	3
10	Czech Republic	0	0	1	1
10	Lithuania	0	0	1	1
10	Poland	0	0	1	1
10	Ukraine	0	0	1	1
Totals (13 entries)		14	14	13	41

=== Ice dance ===
Total number of Warsaw Cup medals in ice dance by nation
Rank	Nation	Gold	Silver	Bronze	Total
1	France	5	0	2	7
2	Russia	4	2	0	6
3	Slovakia	1	0	1	2
4	Italy	1	0	0	1
5	United States	0	2	3	5
6	South Korea	0	2	1	3
7	Poland	0	2	0	2
8	Ukraine	0	1	1	2
9	Germany	0	1	0	1
9	Japan	0	1	0	1
11	Finland	0	0	2	2
12	China	0	0	1	1
Totals (12 entries)		11	11	11	33

=== Total medals ===
Total number of Warsaw Cup medals by nation
Rank	Nation	Gold	Silver	Bronze	Total
1	Russia	16	11	5	32
2	Poland	6	3	5	14
3	France	6	0	3	9
4	Italy	5	7	3	15
5	Canada	4	0	3	7
6	Germany	3	2	4	9
7	Sweden	3	0	0	3
8	Switzerland	2	3	2	7
9	Georgia	2	0	0	2
10	United States	1	5	7	13
11	Australia	1	2	1	4
12	Japan	1	1	0	2
13	Slovakia	1	0	1	2
14	Great Britain	0	3	0	3
15	Ukraine	0	2	3	5
16	South Korea	0	2	2	4
17	Belarus	0	2	1	3
18	Armenia	0	1	1	2
18	Norway	0	1	1	2
20	Belgium	0	1	0	1
20	Chinese Taipei	0	1	0	1
20	Estonia	0	1	0	1
20	Israel	0	1	0	1
20	Philippines	0	1	0	1
20	Uzbekistan	0	1	0	1
26	Finland	0	0	3	3
27	Czech Republic	0	0	2	2
27	Lithuania	0	0	2	2
29	China	0	0	1	1
Totals (29 entries)		51	51	50	152
