= 2017–18 ISU Grand Prix of Figure Skating =

- Type: Grand Prix
- Date: October 20 – December 10, 2017
- Season: 2017–18
- Previous: 2016–17 Grand Prix
- Next: 2018–19 Grand Prix

The 2017–18 ISU Grand Prix of Figure Skating was a series of senior international competitions organized by the International Skating Union that were held from October through December 2017. Medals were awarded in men's singles, women's singles, pair skating, and ice dance. Skaters earned points based on their placements at each event and the top six in each discipline qualified to compete at the Grand Prix Final in Nagoya, Japan. The corresponding series for junior-level skaters was the 2017–18 ISU Junior Grand Prix.

== Competitions ==
The series included the following events.

Date	Event	Location
October 20–22	2017 Rostelecom Cup	Moscow, Russia
October 27–29	2017 Skate Canada International	Regina, Saskatchewan, Canada
November 3–5	2017 Cup of China	Beijing, China
November 10–12	2017 NHK Trophy	Osaka, Japan
November 17–19	2017 Internationaux de France	Grenoble, France
November 24–26	2017 Skate America	Lake Placid, New York, United States
December 7–10	2017–18 Grand Prix Final	Nagoya, Japan

== Requirements ==
Skaters are eligible to compete on the senior Grand Prix circuit if they had reached the age of 15 before July 1, 2017. They were also required to have earned a minimum total score at certain international events.

== Assignments ==
The ISU announced the preliminary assignments on May 26, 2017.

=== Men's singles ===
Nation	Skater	Assignment(s)	
Canada	Keegan Messing	Skate Canada International	NHK Trophy
Canada	Nam Nguyen	Rostelecom Cup	NHK Trophy
Canada	Kevin Reynolds	Cup of China	Skate America
China	Jin Boyang	Cup of China	Skate America
China	Yan Han	Cup of China	Skate America
Czech Republic	Michal Březina	Skate Canada International	NHK Trophy
Georgia	Moris Kvitelashvili	Rostelecom Cup	Internationaux de France
Israel	Alexei Bychenko	NHK Trophy	Internationaux de France
Israel	Daniel Samohin	Rostelecom Cup	Skate America
Japan	Takahito Mura	Skate Canada International	Skate America
Japan	Shoma Uno	Skate Canada International	Internationaux de France
Kazakhstan	Denis Ten	Rostelecom Cup	Internationaux de France
Latvia	Deniss Vasiļjevs	Rostelecom Cup	NHK Trophy
Russia	Dmitri Aliev	Rostelecom Cup	NHK Trophy
Russia	Mikhail Kolyada	Rostelecom Cup	Cup of China
Russia	Alexander Samarin	Skate Canada International	Internationaux de France
Russia	Sergei Voronov	NHK Trophy	Skate America
Spain	Javier Fernández	Cup of China	Internationaux de France
United States	Max Aaron	Cup of China	Internationaux de France
United States	Jason Brown	Skate Canada International	NHK Trophy
United States	Nathan Chen	Rostelecom Cup	Skate America
United States	Grant Hochstein	Rostelecom Cup	Cup of China
United States	Adam Rippon	NHK Trophy	Skate America
United States	Vincent Zhou	Cup of China	Internationaux de France
Uzbekistan	Misha Ge	Rostelecom Cup	Internationaux de France
Australia	Brendan Kerry	Skate Canada International	
Belgium	Jorik Hendrickx	Skate Canada International	
Canada	Patrick Chan	Skate Canada International	
Canada	Liam Firus	Skate America	
Canada	Nicolas Nadeau	Skate Canada International	
Canada	Roman Sadovsky	Skate America	
China	Zhang He	Cup of China	
France	Kévin Aymoz	Internationaux de France	
France	Romain Ponsart	Internationaux de France	
Germany	Paul Fentz	Skate Canada International	
Japan	Yuzuru Hanyu	Rostelecom Cup	
Japan	Hiroaki Sato	NHK Trophy	
Japan	Keiji Tanaka	Cup of China	
Japan	Kazuki Tomono	NHK Trophy	
Russia	Maxim Kovtun	Skate America	
Russia	Andrei Lazukin	Rostelecom Cup	
Russia	Alexander Petrov	Cup of China	
South Korea	Cha Jun-hwan	Skate Canada International	
Sweden	Alexander Majorov	Cup of China	
United States	Ross Miner	Skate America	

=== Ladies' singles ===
Nation	Skater	Assignment(s)	
Canada	Alaine Chartrand	Skate Canada International	NHK Trophy
Canada	Gabrielle Daleman	Cup of China	Skate America
Canada	Kaetlyn Osmond	Skate Canada International	Internationaux de France
China	Li Xiangning	Cup of China	Skate America
France	Laurine Lecavelier	Skate Canada International	Internationaux de France
France	Maé-Bérénice Méité	Rostelecom Cup	Internationaux de France
Germany	Nicole Schott	Rostelecom Cup	Internationaux de France
Italy	Carolina Kostner	Rostelecom Cup	NHK Trophy
Japan	Wakaba Higuchi	Rostelecom Cup	Cup of China
Japan	Marin Honda	Skate Canada International	Cup of China
Japan	Rika Hongo	Skate Canada International	NHK Trophy
Japan	Mai Mihara	Cup of China	Internationaux de France
Japan	Satoko Miyahara	NHK Trophy	Skate America
Japan	Kaori Sakamoto	Rostelecom Cup	Skate America
Japan	Yuna Shiraiwa	NHK Trophy	Internationaux de France
Kazakhstan	Elizabet Tursynbaeva	Rostelecom Cup	Internationaux de France
Russia	Alena Leonova	NHK Trophy	Skate America
Russia	Evgenia Medvedeva	Rostelecom Cup	NHK Trophy
Russia	Elena Radionova	Rostelecom Cup	Cup of China
Russia	Maria Sotskova	Skate Canada International	Internationaux de France
Russia	Polina Tsurskaya	NHK Trophy	Skate America
Russia	Elizaveta Tuktamysheva	Cup of China	Internationaux de France
Russia	Alina Zagitova	Cup of China	Internationaux de France
Slovakia	Nicole Rajičová	NHK Trophy	Skate America
United States	Mariah Bell	Rostelecom Cup	NHK Trophy
United States	Karen Chen	Skate Canada International	Skate America
United States	Mirai Nagasu	Rostelecom Cup	NHK Trophy
United States	Ashley Wagner	Skate Canada International	Skate America
Armenia	Anastasia Galustyan	Rostelecom Cup	
Australia	Kailani Craine	Skate Canada International	
Canada	Larkyn Austman	Skate Canada International	
China	Zhao Ziquan	Cup of China	
Russia	Valeria Mikhailova	Rostelecom Cup	
Russia	Anna Pogorilaya	Skate Canada International	
Russia	Serafima Sakhanovich	Skate America	
South Korea	Choi Da-bin	Cup of China	
South Korea	Park So-youn	NHK Trophy	
United States	Polina Edmunds	Internationaux de France	
United States	Amber Glenn	Cup of China	
United States	Courtney Hicks	Skate Canada International	
United States	Bradie Tennell	Skate America	

=== Pairs ===
Nation	Team	Assignment(s)	
Austria	Miriam Ziegler / Severin Kiefer	Rostelecom Cup	NHK Trophy
Canada	Meagan Duhamel / Eric Radford	Skate Canada International	Skate America
Canada	Liubov Ilyushechkina / Dylan Moscovitch	Skate Canada International	Internationaux de France
Canada	Kirsten Moore-Towers / Michael Marinaro	Cup of China	Skate America
Canada	Julianne Séguin / Charlie Bilodeau	Rostelecom Cup	NHK Trophy
China	Peng Cheng / Jin Yang	Skate Canada International	Internationaux de France
China	Sui Wenjing / Han Cong	Cup of China	NHK Trophy
China	Yu Xiaoyu / Zhang Hao	Cup of China	Skate America
France	Vanessa James / Morgan Ciprès	Skate Canada International	Internationaux de France
Germany	Aliona Savchenko / Bruno Massot	Skate Canada International	Skate America
Italy	Nicole Della Monica / Matteo Guarise	Cup of China	Internationaux de France
Italy	Valentina Marchei / Ondřej Hotárek	Rostelecom Cup	Cup of China
Japan	Sumire Suto / Francis Boudreau-Audet	Rostelecom Cup	NHK Trophy
Russia	Kristina Astakhova / Alexei Rogonov	Rostelecom Cup	NHK Trophy
Russia	Ksenia Stolbova / Fedor Klimov	Rostelecom Cup	NHK Trophy
Russia	Evgenia Tarasova / Vladimir Morozov	Rostelecom Cup	Internationaux de France
Russia	Natalia Zabiiako / Alexander Enbert	Skate Canada International	Skate America
United States	Marissa Castelli / Mervin Tran	Rostelecom Cup	Internationaux de France
United States	Haven Denney / Brandon Frazier	Skate Canada International	Skate America
United States	Alexa Scimeca Knierim / Chris Knierim	NHK Trophy	Skate America
Canada	Sydney Kolodziej / Maxime Deschamps	Skate Canada International	
China	Zhang Mingyang / Song Bowen	Cup of China	
France	Lola Esbrat / Andrei Novoselov	Internationaux de France	
Great Britain	Zoe Jones / Christopher Boyadji	Internationaux de France	
Japan	Miu Suzaki / Ryuichi Kihara	NHK Trophy	
United States	Ashley Cain / Timothy LeDuc	Cup of China	
United States	Deanna Stellato / Nathan Bartholomay	Skate America	

=== Ice dance ===
Nation	Team	Assignment(s)	
Canada	Piper Gilles / Paul Poirier	Rostelecom Cup	Skate America
Canada	Tessa Virtue / Scott Moir	Skate Canada International	NHK Trophy
Canada	Kaitlyn Weaver / Andrew Poje	Skate Canada International	Internationaux de France
China	Wang Shiyue / Liu Xinyu	Cup of China	Skate America
France	Angélique Abachkina / Louis Thauron	Cup of China	Internationaux de France
France	Marie-Jade Lauriault / Romain Le Gac	Rostelecom Cup	NHK Trophy
France	Gabriella Papadakis / Guillaume Cizeron	Cup of China	Internationaux de France
Italy	Anna Cappellini / Luca Lanotte	NHK Trophy	Skate America
Italy	Charlène Guignard / Marco Fabbri	Rostelecom Cup	Internationaux de France
Japan	Kana Muramoto / Chris Reed	NHK Trophy	Skate America
Poland	Natalia Kaliszek / Maksym Spodyriev	Skate Canada International	Internationaux de France
Russia	Ekaterina Bobrova / Dmitri Soloviev	Rostelecom Cup	Cup of China
Russia	Alla Loboda / Pavel Drozd	Skate Canada International	Internationaux de France
Russia	Victoria Sinitsina / Nikita Katsalapov	NHK Trophy	Skate America
Russia	Alexandra Stepanova / Ivan Bukin	Rostelecom Cup	Internationaux de France
Russia	Tiffany Zahorski / Jonathan Guerreiro	Cup of China	Skate America
Turkey	Alisa Agafonova / Alper Uçar	Rostelecom Cup	Skate Canada International
United States	Madison Chock / Evan Bates	Cup of China	Internationaux de France
United States	Kaitlin Hawayek / Jean-Luc Baker	Skate Canada International	Skate America
United States	Madison Hubbell / Zachary Donohue	Skate Canada International	NHK Trophy
United States	Rachel Parsons / Michael Parsons	Rostelecom Cup	Skate America
United States	Elliana Pogrebinsky / Alex Benoit	Cup of China	Internationaux de France
United States	Maia Shibutani / Alex Shibutani	Rostelecom Cup	Skate America
Canada	Carolane Soucisse / Shane Firus	Skate Canada International	
China	Chen Hong / Zhao Yan	Cup of China	
China	Wang Xiaotong / Zhao Kaige	Cup of China	
Czech Republic	Nicole Kuzmichová / Alexandr Sinicyn	Rostelecom Cup	
Denmark	Laurence Fournier Beaudry / Nikolaj Sørensen	NHK Trophy	
France	Lorenza Alessandrini / Pierre Souquet	Internationaux de France	
Germany	Kavita Lorenz / Joti Polizoakis	Skate Canada International	
Great Britain	Penny Coomes / Nicholas Buckland	NHK Trophy	
Japan	Misato Komatsubara / Timothy Koleto	NHK Trophy	
Russia	Betina Popova / Sergey Mozgov	Rostelecom Cup	
Spain	Olivia Smart / Adrià Díaz	Skate Canada International	
Ukraine	Alexandra Nazarova / Maxim Nikitin	NHK Trophy	
United States	Lorraine McNamara / Quinn Carpenter	Cup of China	

=== Changes to preliminary assignments ===
==== Rostelecom Cup ====
Discipline	Withdrew		Added		Notes	Ref.
Discipline	Date	Skater(s)	Date	Skater(s)	Notes	Ref.
Ladies	September 13	(Hungary) Ivett Tóth	September 26	(Germany) Nicole Schott	Injury	
Men	—N/a		September 14	(Russia) Andrei Lazukin	Host picks	
Pairs	—N/a		September 14	(Russia) Kristina Astakhova / Alexei Rogonov	Host picks	
Ice dance	—N/a		September 14	(Russia) Sofia Evdokimova / Egor Bazin	Host picks	
Ladies	—N/a		September 20	(Russia) Valeria Mikhailova	Host picks	
Pairs	September 20	(China) Wang Xuehan / Wang Lei	September 22	(Austria) Miriam Ziegler / Severin Kiefer	Injury (Xuehan)	
Ice dance	October 9	(Russia) Sofia Evdokimova / Egor Bazin	October 9	(Russia) Betina Popova / Sergey Mozgov	Injury (Evdokimova)	
Ladies	October 9	(South Korea) Park So-youn	October 10	(Armenia) Anastasia Galustyan	Injury recovery	
Men	October 16	(Japan) Keiji Tanaka	October 16	(Georgia (country)) Moris Kvitelashvili	Injury	

==== Skate Canada International ====
Discipline	Withdrew		Added		Notes	Ref.
Discipline	Date	Skater(s)	Date	Skater(s)	Notes	Ref.
Men	—N/a		September 13	(Canada) Nicolas Nadeau	Host picks	
Ladies	—N/a		September 13	(Canada) Larkyn Austman	Host picks	
Pairs	—N/a		September 13	(Canada) Sydney Kolodziej / Maxime Deschamps	Host picks	
Men	September 29	(Russia) Maxim Kovtun	October 2	(Czech Republic) Michal Březina	Recurring injury	
Ladies	October 9	(Italy) Roberta Rodeghiero	October 11	(United States) Courtney Hicks		
Ladies	October 9	(South Korea) Kim Na-hyun	October 12	(Australia) Kailani Craine		
Men	October 9	(France) Chafik Besseghier	October 12	(Germany) Paul Fentz		

==== Cup of China ====
Discipline	Withdrew		Added		Notes	Ref.
Discipline	Date	Skater(s)	Date	Skater(s)	Notes	Ref.
Pairs	September 15	(United States) Tarah Kayne / Daniel O'Shea	September 15	(United States) Ashley Cain / Timothy LeDuc	Focus on injury recovery (Kayne)	
Men	—N/a		September 20	(China) Zhang He	Host picks	
Pairs	—N/a		September 20	(China) Zhang Mingyang / Song Bowen	Host picks	
Ice dance	October 16	(China) Song Linshu / Sun Zhuoming	October 16	(China) Wang Xiaotong / Zhao Kaige		
Ladies	October 13	(United States) Gracie Gold	October 23	(United States) Amber Glenn	Focus on treatment	
Ladies	October 31	(China) Li Zijun	—N/a			
Pairs	October 31	(Czech Republic) Anna Dušková / Martin Bidař	—N/a		Injury (Dušková)	

==== NHK Trophy ====
Discipline	Withdrew		Added		Notes	Ref.
Discipline	Date	Skater(s)	Date	Skater(s)	Notes	Ref.
Men	—N/a		August 23	(Japan) Hiroaki Sato	Host picks	
Pairs	—N/a		September 19	(Japan) Miu Suzaki / Ryuichi Kihara	Host picks	
Ice dance	—N/a		September 19	(Japan) Misato Komatsubara / Timothy Koleto	Host picks	
Men	September 22	(United States) Joshua Farris	September 29	(Canada) Nam Nguyen		
Men	November 3	(Canada) Patrick Chan	November 3	(Canada) Keegan Messing	Focus on preparing for Canadian Nationals	
Men	November 6	(Japan) Daisuke Murakami	November 6	(Japan) Kazuki Tomono	Pneumonia	
Ice dance	November 8	(Israel) Isabella Tobias / Ilia Tkachenko	November 8	(United Kingdom) Penny Coomes / Nicholas Buckland		
Men	November 10	(Japan) Yuzuru Hanyu	—N/a		Injury	

==== Internationaux de France ====
Discipline	Withdrew		Added		Notes	Ref.
Discipline	Date	Skater(s)	Date	Skater(s)	Notes	Ref.
Pairs	—N/a		September 19	(France) Lola Esbrat / Andrei Novoselov	Host picks	
Ice dance	—N/a		September 19	(France) Lorenza Alessandrini / Pierre Souquet	Host picks	
Ladies	October 13	(United States) Gracie Gold	October 31	(Germany) Nicole Schott	Focus on treatment	
Pairs	October 25	(China) Wang Xuehan / Wang Lei	October 31	(United Kingdom) Zoe Jones / Christopher Boyadji		
Pairs	October 31	(Czech Republic) Anna Dušková / Martin Bidař	November 6	(United States) Marissa Castelli / Mervin Tran	Injury (Dušková)	
Ladies	November 6	(China) Li Zijun	—N/a			
Men	November 10	(France) Chafik Besseghier	—N/a			

==== Skate America ====
Discipline	Withdrew		Added		Notes	Ref.
Discipline	Date	Skater(s)	Date	Skater(s)	Notes	Ref.
Men	—N/a		September 19	(United States) Ross Miner	Host picks	
Ladies	—N/a		September 19	(United States) Bradie Tennell	Host picks	
Pairs	—N/a		September 19	(United States) Deanna Stellato / Nathan Bartholomay	Host picks	
Ice dance	—N/a		September 19	(United States) Rachel Parsons / Michael Parsons	Host picks	
Men	November 10	(Russia) Alexander Petrov	November 13	(Canada) Roman Sadovsky	Injury	
Men	November 16	(South Korea) Cha Jun-hwan	November 16	(China) Yan Han	Focus on injury recovery	
Ladies	November 17	(South Korea) Choi Da-bin	—N/a			
Ladies	November 20	(Russia) Anna Pogorilaya	November 20	(Russia) Serafima Sakhanovich	Focus on injury recovery	
Men	November 22	(Belgium) Jorik Hendrickx	November 22	(Canada) Liam Firus		
Ice dance	November 22	(Israel) Isabella Tobias / Ilia Tkachenko	—N/a			

== Medal summary ==
Event	Discipline	Gold	Silver	Bronze
(Russia) Rostelecom Cup	Men	(United States) Nathan Chen	(Japan) Yuzuru Hanyu	(Russia) Mikhail Kolyada
(Russia) Rostelecom Cup	Ladies	(Russia) Evgenia Medvedeva	(Italy) Carolina Kostner	(Japan) Wakaba Higuchi
(Russia) Rostelecom Cup	Pairs	(Russia) Evgenia Tarasova / Vladimir Morozov	(Russia) Ksenia Stolbova / Fedor Klimov	(Russia) Kristina Astakhova / Alexei Rogonov
(Russia) Rostelecom Cup	Ice dance	(United States) Maia Shibutani / Alex Shibutani	(Russia) Ekaterina Bobrova / Dmitri Soloviev	(Russia) Alexandra Stepanova / Ivan Bukin

Event	Discipline	Gold	Silver	Bronze
Skate Canada International	Men	(Japan) Shoma Uno	(United States) Jason Brown	(Russia) Alexander Samarin
Skate Canada International	Ladies	(Canada) Kaetlyn Osmond	(Russia) Maria Sotskova	(United States) Ashley Wagner
Skate Canada International	Pairs	(Canada) Meagan Duhamel / Eric Radford	(Germany) Aliona Savchenko / Bruno Massot	(France) Vanessa James / Morgan Ciprès
Skate Canada International	Ice dance	(Canada) Tessa Virtue / Scott Moir	(Canada) Kaitlyn Weaver / Andrew Poje	(United States) Madison Hubbell / Zachary Donohue

Event	Discipline	Gold	Silver	Bronze
Cup of China	Men	(Russia) Mikhail Kolyada	(China) Jin Boyang	(United States) Max Aaron
Cup of China	Ladies	(Russia) Alina Zagitova	(Japan) Wakaba Higuchi	(Russia) Elena Radionova
Cup of China	Pairs	(China) Sui Wenjing / Han Cong	(China) Yu Xiaoyu / Zhang Hao	(Canada) Kirsten Moore-Towers / Michael Marinaro
Cup of China	Ice dance	(France) Gabriella Papadakis / Guillaume Cizeron	(United States) Madison Chock / Evan Bates	(Russia) Ekaterina Bobrova / Dmitri Soloviev

Event	Discipline	Gold	Silver	Bronze
(Japan) NHK Trophy	Men	(Russia) Sergei Voronov	(United States) Adam Rippon	(Israel) Alexei Bychenko
(Japan) NHK Trophy	Ladies	(Russia) Evgenia Medvedeva	(Italy) Carolina Kostner	(Russia) Polina Tsurskaya
(Japan) NHK Trophy	Pairs	(China) Sui Wenjing / Han Cong	(Russia) Ksenia Stolbova / Fedor Klimov	(Russia) Kristina Astakhova / Alexei Rogonov
(Japan) NHK Trophy	Ice dance	(Canada) Tessa Virtue / Scott Moir	(United States) Madison Hubbell / Zachary Donohue	(Italy) Anna Cappellini / Luca Lanotte

Event	Discipline	Gold	Silver	Bronze
Internationaux de France	Men	(Spain) Javier Fernández	(Japan) Shoma Uno	(Uzbekistan) Misha Ge
Internationaux de France	Ladies	(Russia) Alina Zagitova	(Russia) Maria Sotskova	(Canada) Kaetlyn Osmond
Internationaux de France	Pairs	(Russia) Evgenia Tarasova / Vladimir Morozov	(France) Vanessa James / Morgan Cipres	(Italy) Nicole Della Monica / Matteo Guarise
Internationaux de France	Ice dance	(France) Gabriella Papadakis / Guillaume Cizeron	(United States) Madison Chock / Evan Bates	(Russia) Alexandra Stepanova / Ivan Bukin

Event	Discipline	Gold	Silver	Bronze
(United States) Skate America	Men	(United States) Nathan Chen	(United States) Adam Rippon	(Russia) Sergei Voronov
(United States) Skate America	Ladies	(Japan) Satoko Miyahara	(Japan) Kaori Sakamoto	(United States) Bradie Tennell
(United States) Skate America	Pairs	(Germany) Aliona Savchenko / Bruno Massot	(China) Yu Xiaoyu / Zhang Hao	(Canada) Meagan Duhamel / Eric Radford
(United States) Skate America	Ice dance	(United States) Maia Shibutani / Alex Shibutani	(Italy) Anna Cappellini / Luca Lanotte	(Russia) Victoria Sinitsina / Nikita Katsalapov

Event	Discipline	Gold	Silver	Bronze
(Japan) Grand Prix Final	Men	(United States) Nathan Chen	(Japan) Shoma Uno	(Russia) Mikhail Kolyada
(Japan) Grand Prix Final	Ladies	(Russia) Alina Zagitova	(Russia) Maria Sotskova	(Canada) Kaetlyn Osmond
(Japan) Grand Prix Final	Pairs	(Germany) Aliona Savchenko / Bruno Massot	(China) Sui Wenjing / Han Cong	(Canada) Meagan Duhamel / Eric Radford
(Japan) Grand Prix Final	Ice dance	(France) Gabriella Papadakis / Guillaume Cizeron	(Canada) Tessa Virtue / Scott Moir	(United States) Maia Shibutani / Alex Shibutani

=== Medal standings ===
Rank	Nation	Gold	Silver	Bronze	Total
1	Russia (RUS)	9	6	12	27
2	United States (USA)	5	6	5	16
3	Canada (CAN)	4	2	5	11
4	France (FRA)	3	1	1	5
5	Japan (JPN)	2	5	1	8
6	China (CHN)	2	4	0	6
7	Germany (GER)	2	1	0	3
8	Spain (ESP)	1	0	0	1
9	Italy (ITA)	0	3	2	5
10	Israel (ISR)	0	0	1	1
10	Uzbekistan (UZB)	0	0	1	1
Totals (11 entries)		28	28	28	84

== Qualification ==
At each event, skaters earned points toward qualifying for the Grand Prix Final. Following the sixth event, the top six highest-scoring skaters/teams advanced to the Final. The points earned per placement were as follows:

Placement	Singles	Pairs/Ice dance
1st	15	15
2nd	13	13
3rd	11	11
4th	9	9
5th	7	7
6th	5	5
7th	4	—N/a
8th	3	—N/a

There were originally seven tie-breakers in cases of a tie in overall points:

1. Highest placement at an event. If a skater placed 1st and 3rd, the tiebreaker is the 1st place, and that beats a skater who placed 2nd in both events.
2. Highest combined total scores in both events. If a skater earned 200 points at one event and 250 at a second, that skater would win in the second tie-break over a skater who earned 200 points at one event and 150 at another.
3. Participated in two events.
4. Highest combined scores in the free skating/free dancing portion of both events.
5. Highest individual score in the free skating/free dancing portion from one event.
6. Highest combined scores in the short program/short dance of both events.
7. Highest number of total participants at the events.

If a tie remained, it was considered unbreakable and the tied skaters all advanced to the Grand Prix Final.

=== Qualification standings ===
Pts.	Men	Ladies	Pairs	Ice dance
30	(United States) Nathan Chen	(Russia) Evgenia Medvedeva (Russia) Alina Zagitova	(China) Sui Wenjing / Han Cong (Russia) Evgenia Tarasova / Vladimir Morozov	(France) Gabriella Papadakis / Guillaume Cizeron (Canada) Tessa Virtue / Scott Moir (United States) Maia Shibutani / Alex Shibutani
28	(Japan) Shoma Uno	—N/a	(Germany) Aliona Savchenko / Bruno Massot	—N/a
26	(Russia) Mikhail Kolyada (Russia) Sergei Voronov (United States) Adam Rippon	(Canada) Kaetlyn Osmond (Italy) Carolina Kostner (Russia) Maria Sotskova	(Canada) Meagan Duhamel / Eric Radford (Russia) Ksenia Stolbova / Fedor Klimov (China) Yu Xiaoyu / Zhang Hao	(United States) Madison Chock / Evan Bates
24	—N/a	(Japan) Wakaba Higuchi	(France) Vanessa James / Morgan Ciprès	(United States) Madison Hubbell / Zachary Donohue (Italy) Anna Cappellini / Luca Lanotte (Russia) Ekaterina Bobrova / Dmitri Soloviev
22	(China) Jin Boyang (United States) Jason Brown	(Japan) Satoko Miyahara	(Russia) Kristina Astakhova / Alexei Rogonov	(Canada) Kaitlyn Weaver / Andrew Poje (Russia) Alexandra Stepanova / Ivan Bukin
20	(Spain) Javier Fernández (Uzbekistan) Misha Ge (Russia) Alexander Samarin	(Japan) Kaori Sakamoto (Russia) Polina Tsurskaya (Russia) Elena Radionova	(Italy) Nicole Della Monica / Matteo Guarise	(Russia) Victoria Sinitsina / Nikita Katsalapov
18	(Israel) Alexei Bychenko	(Japan) Mai Mihara	(Russia) Natalia Zabiiako / Alexander Enbert	(Canada) Piper Gilles / Paul Poirier
16	—N/a		(Canada) Kirsten Moore-Towers / Michael Marinaro (Italy) Valentina Marchei / Ondřej Hotárek (Canada) Julianne Séguin / Charlie Bilodeau	(United States) Kaitlin Hawayek / Jean-Luc Baker
15	(United States) Max Aaron	—N/a		
14	(China) Yan Han	(Japan) Marin Honda	(Canada) Liubov Ilyushechkina / Dylan Moscovitch (United States) Alexa Scimeca Knierim / Chris Knierim (China) Peng Cheng / Jin Yang	(Russia) Tiffany Zahorski / Jonathan Guerreiro (Italy) Charlène Guignard / Marco Fabbri
13	(Japan) Yuzuru Hanyu	—N/a	—N/a	—N/a
12	(Georgia (country)) Moris Kvitelashvili	—N/a	—N/a	—N/a
11	—N/a	(United States) Bradie Tennell (United States) Ashley Wagner	—N/a	—N/a
10	(Canada) Keegan Messing	(Kazakhstan) Elizabet Tursynbaeva (Canada) Gabrielle Daleman	(Austria) Miriam Ziegler / Severin Kiefer	—N/a
9	(United States) Vincent Zhou (Canada) Patrick Chan	(United States) Mirai Nagasu (United States) Courtney Hicks (Russia) Alena Leonova (Japan) Rika Hongo	—N/a	—N/a
8	(Russia) Dmitri Aliev (Latvia) Deniss Vasiļjevs	(Japan) Yuna Shiraiwa	—N/a	—N/a
7	(Belgium) Jorik Hendrickx	(Russia) Serafima Sakhanovich (United States) Karen Chen	—N/a	(Russia) Alla Loboda / Pavel Drozd (Denmark) Laurence Fournier Beaudry / Nikolaj Sørensen (United States) Lorraine McNamara / Quinn Carpenter
5	(Czech Republic) Michal Březina (United States) Ross Miner	(United States) Mariah Bell	(United States) Marissa Castelli / Mervin Tran (United States) Ashley Cain / Timothy LeDuc	(China) Wang Shiyue / Liu Xinyu (France) Angélique Abachkina / Louis Thauron (Russia) Betina Popova / Sergey Mozgov (Ukraine) Alexandra Nazarova / Maxim Nikitin (Spain) Olivia Smart / Adrià Díaz
4	(Canada) Nam Nguyen (Japan) Takahito Mura (Japan) Keiji Tanaka (Japan) Kazuki Tomono (Canada) Nicolas Nadeau	(Russia) Elizaveta Tuktamysheva (Germany) Nicole Schott (Russia) Valeria Mikhailova	—N/a	
3	(Kazakhstan) Denis Ten (Canada) Kevin Reynolds (Canada) Liam Firus	(China) Li Xiangning (France) Maé-Bérénice Méité (France) Laurine Lecavelier	—N/a	

=== Qualifiers ===
No.	Men	Ladies	Pairs	Ice dance
1	(United States) Nathan Chen	(Russia) ~~Evgenia Medvedeva~~ (withdrew)	(China) Sui Wenjing / Han Cong	(France) Gabriella Papadakis / Guillaume Cizeron
2	(Japan) Shoma Uno	(Russia) Alina Zagitova	(Russia) Evgenia Tarasova / Vladimir Morozov	(Canada) Tessa Virtue / Scott Moir
3	(Russia) Mikhail Kolyada	(Canada) Kaetlyn Osmond	(Germany) Aliona Savchenko / Bruno Massot	(United States) Maia Shibutani / Alex Shibutani
4	(Russia) Sergei Voronov	(Italy) Carolina Kostner	(Canada) Meagan Duhamel / Eric Radford	(United States) Madison Chock / Evan Bates
5	(United States) Adam Rippon	(Russia) Maria Sotskova	(Russia) Ksenia Stolbova / Fedor Klimov	(United States) Madison Hubbell / Zachary Donohue
6	(China) ~~Jin Boyang~~ (withdrew)	(Japan) Wakaba Higuchi	(China) Yu Xiaoyu / Zhang Hao	(Italy) Anna Cappellini / Luca Lanotte

Alternates

No.	Men	Ladies	Pairs	Ice dance
1	(United States) Jason Brown (called up)	(Japan) Satoko Miyahara (called up)	(France) Vanessa James / Morgan Ciprès	(Russia) Ekaterina Bobrova / Dmitri Soloviev
2	(Spain) Javier Fernández	(Japan) Kaori Sakamoto	(Russia) Kristina Astakhova / Alexei Rogonov	(Canada) Kaitlyn Weaver / Andrew Poje
3	(Uzbekistan) Misha Ge	(Russia) Polina Tsurskaya	(Italy) Nicole Della Monica / Matteo Guarise	(Russia) Alexandra Stepanova / Ivan Bukin

== Top scores ==
=== Men's singles ===
Top 10 best scores in the men's combined total
No.	Skater	Nation	Score	Event
1	Shoma Uno	Japan	301.10	2017 Skate Canada International
2	Nathan Chen	United States	293.79	2017 Rostelecom Cup
3	Yuzuru Hanyu	Japan	290.77	2017 Rostelecom Cup
4	Javier Fernández	Spain	283.71	2017 Internationaux de France
5	Mikhail Kolyada	Russia	282.00	2017–18 Grand Prix Final
6	Sergei Voronov	Russia	271.12	2017 NHK Trophy
7	Adam Rippon	United States	266.45	2017 Skate America
8	Jin Boyang	China	264.48	2017 Cup of China
9	Jason Brown	United States	261.14	2017 Skate Canada International
10	Max Aaron	United States	259.69	2017 Cup of China

Top 10 best scores in the men's short program
No.	Skater	Nation	Score	Event
1	Javier Fernández	Spain	107.86	2017 Internationaux de France
2	Nathan Chen	United States	104.12	2017 Skate America
3	Shoma Uno	Japan	103.62	2017 Skate Canada International
4	Mikhail Kolyada	Russia	103.13	2017 Cup of China
5	Yuzuru Hanyu	Japan	94.85	2017 Rostelecom Cup
6	Patrick Chan	Canada	94.43	2017 Skate Canada International
7	Jin Boyang	China	93.89	2017 Cup of China
8	Alexander Samarin	Russia	91.51	2017 Internationaux de France
9	Jason Brown	United States	90.71	2017 Skate Canada International
10	Sergei Voronov	Russia	90.06	2017 NHK Trophy

Top 10 best scores in the men's free skating
No.	Skater	Nation	Score	Event
1	Shoma Uno	Japan	197.48	2017 Skate Canada International
2	Yuzuru Hanyu	Japan	195.92	2017 Rostelecom Cup
3	Nathan Chen	United States	193.25	2017 Rostelecom Cup
4	Mikhail Kolyada	Russia	185.27	2017 Rostelecom Cup
5	Sergei Voronov	Russia	181.06	2017 NHK Trophy
6	Javier Fernández	Spain	179.40	2017 Internationaux de France
7	Adam Rippon	United States	177.41	2017 Skate America
8	Max Aaron	United States	176.58	2017 Cup of China
9	Vincent Zhou	United States	176.43	2017 Cup of China
10	Misha Ge	Uzbekistan	172.93	2017 Internationaux de France

=== Ladies ===
Top 10 best scores in the ladies' combined total
No.	Skater	Nation	Score	Event
1	Evgenia Medvedeva	Russia	231.21	2017 Rostelecom Cup
2	Alina Zagitova	Russia	223.30	2017–18 Grand Prix Final
3	Maria Sotskova	Russia	216.28	2017–18 Grand Prix Final
4	Carolina Kostner	Italy	215.98	2017 Rostelecom Cup
5	Kaetlyn Osmond	Canada	215.16	2017–18 Grand Prix Final
6	Satoko Miyahara	Japan	214.03	2017 Skate America
7	Wakaba Higuchi	Japan	212.52	2017 Cup of China
8	Kaori Sakamoto	Japan	210.59	2017 Skate America
9	Polina Tsurskaya	Russia	210.19	2017 NHK Trophy
10	Elena Radionova	Russia	206.82	2017 Cup of China

Top 10 best scores in the ladies' short program
No.	Skater	Nation	Score	Event
1	Evgenia Medvedeva	Russia	80.75	2017 Rostelecom Cup
2	Kaetlyn Osmond	Canada	77.04	2017–18 Grand Prix Final
3	Alina Zagitova	Russia	76.27	2017–18 Grand Prix Final
4	Carolina Kostner	Italy	74.62	2017 Rostelecom Cup
5	Satoko Miyahara	Japan	74.61	2017–18 Grand Prix Final
6	Maria Sotskova	Russia	74.00	2017–18 Grand Prix Final
7	Wakaba Higuchi	Japan	73.26	2017–18 Grand Prix Final
8	Gabrielle Daleman	Canada	70.65	2017 Cup of China
9	Elena Radionova	Russia	70.48	2017 Cup of China
10	Polina Tsurskaya	Russia	70.04	2017 NHK Trophy

Top 10 best scores in the ladies' free skating
No.	Skater	Nation	Score	Event
1	Alina Zagitova	Russia	151.34	2017 Internationaux de France
2	Evgenia Medvedeva	Russia	150.46	2017 Rostelecom Cup
3	Satoko Miyahara	Japan	143.31	2017 Skate America
4	Maria Sotskova	Russia	142.28	2017–18 Grand Prix Final
5	Wakaba Higuchi	Japan	141.99	2017 Cup of China
6	Carolina Kostner	Italy	141.83	2017–18 Grand Prix Final
7	Kaori Sakamoto	Japan	141.19	2017 Skate America
8	Polina Tsurskaya	Russia	140.15	2017 NHK Trophy
9	Mai Mihara	Japan	139.17	2017 Cup of China
10	Elizabet Tursynbaeva	Kazakhstan	138.69	2017 Internationaux de France

=== Pairs ===
Top 10 best scores in the pairs' combined total
No.	Team	Nation	Score	Event
1	Aliona Savchenko / Bruno Massot	Germany	236.68	2017–18 Grand Prix Final
2	Sui Wenjing / Han Cong	China	234.53	2017 NHK Trophy
3	Evgenia Tarasova / Vladimir Morozov	Russia	224.25	2017 Rostelecom Cup
4	Ksenia Stolbova / Fedor Klimov	Russia	222.74	2017 NHK Trophy
5	Meagan Duhamel / Eric Radford	Canada	222.22	2017 Skate Canada International
6	Yu Xiaoyu / Zhang Hao	China	219.20	2017 Skate America
7	Vanessa James / Morgan Ciprès	France	214.37	2017 Skate Canada International
8	Kristina Astakhova / Alexei Rogonov	Russia	203.64	2017 NHK Trophy
9	Natalia Zabiiako / Alexander Enbert	Russia	197.89	2017 Skate America
10	Nicole Della Monica / Matteo Guarise	Italy	197.59	2017 Internationaux de France

Top 10 best scores in the pairs' short program
No.	Team	Nation	Score	Event
1	Sui Wenjing / Han Cong	China	80.14	2017 Cup of China
2	Aliona Savchenko / Bruno Massot	Germany	79.43	2017–18 Grand Prix Final
3	Evgenia Tarasova / Vladimir Morozov	Russia	78.83	2017–18 Grand Prix Final
4	Meagan Duhamel / Eric Radford	Canada	75.37	2017 Skate America
5	Ksenia Stolbova / Fedor Klimov	Russia	75.05	2017 NHK Trophy
6	Yu Xiaoyu / Zhang Hao	China	73.67	2017 Skate America
7	Vanessa James / Morgan Ciprès	France	73.18	2017 Internationaux de France
8	Nicole Della Monica / Matteo Guarise	Italy	70.85	2017 Internationaux de France
9	Kristina Astakhova / Alexei Rogonov	Russia	70.47	2017 NHK Trophy
10	Natalia Zabiiako / Alexander Enbert	Russia	70.15	2017 Skate America

Top 10 best scores in the pairs' free skating
No.	Team	Nation	Score	Event
1	Aliona Savchenko / Bruno Massot	Germany	157.25	2017–18 Grand Prix Final
2	Sui Wenjing / Han Cong	China	155.10	2017 NHK Trophy
3	Ksenia Stolbova / Fedor Klimov	Russia	147.69	2017 NHK Trophy
4	Evgenia Tarasova / Vladimir Morozov	Russia	147.37	2017 Rostelecom Cup
5	Yu Xiaoyu / Zhang Hao	China	145.53	2017 Skate America
6	Meagan Duhamel / Eric Radford	Canada	144.79	2017 Skate Canada International
7	Vanessa James / Morgan Ciprès	France	141.33	2017 Skate Canada International
8	Kristina Astakhova / Alexei Rogonov	Russia	133.17	2017 NHK Trophy
9	Kirsten Moore-Towers / Michael Marinaro	Canada	132.00	2017 Cup of China
10	Julianne Séguin / Charlie Bilodeau	Canada	130.39	2017 NHK Trophy

=== Ice dance ===
Top 10 best scores in the combined total (ice dance)
No.	Team	Nation	Score	Event
1	Gabriella Papadakis / Guillaume Cizeron	France	202.16	2017–18 Grand Prix Final
2	Tessa Virtue / Scott Moir	Canada	199.86	2017 Skate Canada International
2	Tessa Virtue / Scott Moir	Canada	199.86	2017–18 Grand Prix Final
3	Maia Shibutani / Alex Shibutani	United States	194.25	2017 Skate America
4	Kaitlyn Weaver / Andrew Poje	Canada	190.01	2017 Skate Canada International
5	Madison Hubbell / Zachary Donohue	United States	189.43	2017 Skate Canada International
6	Madison Chock / Evan Bates	United States	187.15	2017–18 Grand Prix Final
7	Anna Cappellini / Luca Lanotte	Italy	186.56	2017 NHK Trophy
8	Ekaterina Bobrova / Dmitri Soloviev	Russia	184.74	2017 Rostelecom Cup
9	Alexandra Stepanova / Ivan Bukin	Russia	179.35	2017 Rostelecom Cup
10	Victoria Sinitsina / Nikita Katsalapov	Russia	177.15	2017 NHK Trophy

Top 10 best scores in the short dance
No.	Team	Nation	Score	Event
1	Tessa Virtue / Scott Moir	Canada	82.68	2017 Skate Canada International
2	Gabriella Papadakis / Guillaume Cizeron	France	82.07	2017–18 Grand Prix Final
3	Maia Shibutani / Alex Shibutani	United States	79.18	2017 Skate America
4	Kaitlyn Weaver / Andrew Poje	Canada	77.47	2017 Skate Canada International
5	Ekaterina Bobrova / Dmitri Soloviev	Russia	76.33	2017 Rostelecom Cup
6	Madison Hubbell / Zachary Donohue	United States	76.31	2017 NHK Trophy
7	Anna Cappellini / Luca Lanotte	Italy	75.87	2017 NHK Trophy
8	Madison Chock / Evan Bates	United States	74.36	2017–18 Grand Prix Final
9	Victoria Sinitsina / Nikita Katsalapov	Russia	72.49	2017 NHK Trophy
10	Alexandra Stepanova / Ivan Bukin	Russia	71.32	2017 Rostelecom Cup

Top 10 best scores in the free dance
No.	Team	Nation	Score	Event
1	Gabriella Papadakis / Guillaume Cizeron	France	120.58	2017 Internationaux de France
2	Tessa Virtue / Scott Moir	Canada	118.33	2017–18 Grand Prix Final
3	Maia Shibutani / Alex Shibutani	United States	115.07	2017 Skate America
4	Madison Hubbell / Zachary Donohue	United States	113.35	2017 Skate Canada International
5	Madison Chock / Evan Bates	United States	112.79	2017–18 Grand Prix Final
6	Kaitlyn Weaver / Andrew Poje	Canada	112.54	2017 Skate Canada International
7	Anna Cappellini / Luca Lanotte	Italy	110.99	2017–18 Grand Prix Final
8	Ekaterina Bobrova / Dmitri Soloviev	Russia	110.50	2017 Cup of China
9	Alexandra Stepanova / Ivan Bukin	Russia	108.03	2017 Rostelecom Cup
10	Victoria Sinitsina / Nikita Katsalapov	Russia	107.81	2017 Skate America
