= 2016 Rostelecom Cup =

- Type: Grand Prix
- Date: November 4 – 5
- Season: 2016–17
- Location: Moscow
- Host: Figure Skating Federation of Russia
- Venue: Megasport Arena

Champions
- Men's singles: (Spain) Javier Fernández
- Ladies' singles: (Russia) Anna Pogorilaya
- Pairs: (Germany) Aliona Savchenko / Bruno Massot
- Ice dance: (Russia) Ekaterina Bobrova / Dmitri Soloviev
- Previous: 2015 Rostelecom Cup
- Next: 2017 Rostelecom Cup
- Previous Grand Prix: 2016 Skate Canada International
- Next Grand Prix: 2016 Trophée de France

The 2016 Rostelecom Cup was the third event of six in the 2016–17 ISU Grand Prix of Figure Skating, a senior-level international invitational competition series. It was held at the Megasport Arena in Moscow on November 4–5. Medals were awarded in the disciplines of men's singles, ladies' singles, pair skating, and ice dancing.

Skaters earned points toward qualifying for the 2016–17 Grand Prix Final.

== Entries ==
The ISU published the preliminary assignments on June 30, 2016.

Country	Men	Ladies	Pairs	Ice dancing
Armenia		Anastasia Galustyan		
Belarus				Viktoria Kavaliova / Yurii Bieliaiev
Canada	Elladj Baldé		Camille Ruest / Andrew Wolfe; Julianne Séguin / Charlie Bilodeau	Kaitlyn Weaver / Andrew Poje
China		Li Zijun		
Denmark				Laurence Fournier Beaudry / Nikolaj Sorensen
France	Chafik Besseghier			
Germany			Aliona Savchenko / Bruno Massot	
Israel	Oleksii Bychenko			
Italy		Roberta Rodeghiero	Valentina Marchei / Ondřej Hotárek	Charlène Guignard / Marco Fabbri
Japan	Keiji Tanaka; Shoma Uno	Yura Matsuda; Kanako Murakami		
Kazakhstan		Elizabet Tursynbayeva		
Latvia	Deniss Vasiļjevs	Angelīna Kučvaļska		
Lithuania			Goda Butkutė / Nikita Ermolaev	
Russia	Artur Dmitriev Jr. Mikhail Kolyada; Gordei Gorshkov	Yulia Lipnitskaya; Anna Pogorilaya; Elena Radionova	Kristina Astakhova / Alexei Rogonov; Alisa Efimova / Alexander Korovin; Natalja Zabijako / Alexander Enbert	Ekaterina Bobrova / Dmitri Soloviev; Tiffany Zahorski / Jonathan Guerreiro; Sofia Evdokimova / Egor Bazin
Slovakia		Nicole Rajičová		
Spain	Javier Fernández			
Sweden	Alexander Majorov			
Turkey				Alisa Agafonova / Alper Uçar
United States	Max Aaron	Courtney Hicks		Madison Chock / Evan Bates; Elliana Pogrebinsky / Alex Benoit

=== Changes to preliminary assignments ===
Date	Discipline	Withdrew	Added	Reason/Other notes	Refs
September 15	Men	N/A	(Russia) Gordei Gorshkov	Host pick	
September 15	Ice dancing	N/A	(Russia) Sofia Evdokimova / Egor Bazin	Host pick	
September 28 and 30	Pairs	(United States) Alexa Scimeca / Chris Knierim	(Lithuania) Goda Butkutė / Nikita Ermolaev	Illness (Scimeca)	
October 12 and 17	Ladies	(United States) Polina Edmunds	(Armenia) Anastasia Galustyan	Injury	
October 17	Pairs	(Canada) Kirsten Moore-Towers / Michael Marinaro	(Canada) Camille Ruest / Andrew Wolfe		
October 17 and 20	Pairs	(Russia) Ksenia Stolbova / Fedor Klimov	(Russia) Alisa Efimova / Alexander Korovin		

== Results ==
=== Men ===
Rank	Name	Nation	Total points	SP		FS	
1	Javier Fernández	Spain	292.98	2	91.55	1	201.43
2	Shoma Uno	Japan	285.07	1	98.59	2	186.48
3	Oleksii Bychenko	Israel	255.52	4	86.81	3	168.71
4	Mikhail Kolyada	Russia	245.30	3	90.28	6	155.02
5	Max Aaron	United States	235.58	8	73.64	4	161.94
6	Elladj Baldé	Canada	225.45	6	76.36	8	149.09
7	Keiji Tanaka	Japan	224.91	10	69.13	5	155.78
8	Chafik Besseghier	France	223.98	5	80.68	10	143.30
9	Gordei Gorshkov	Russia	223.51	9	73.37	7	150.14
10	Artur Dmitriev Jr.	Russia	221.52	7	76.06	9	145.46
11	Deniss Vasiļjevs	Latvia	203.77	12	62.40	11	141.37
12	Alexander Majorov	Sweden	192.14	11	67.80	12	124.34

=== Ladies ===
Rank	Name	Nation	Total points	SP		FS	
1	Anna Pogorilaya	Russia	215.21	1	73.93	1	141.28
2	Elena Radionova	Russia	195.60	2	71.93	2	123.67
3	Courtney Hicks	United States	182.98	6	63.68	3	119.30
4	Li Zijun	China	181.83	5	63.89	4	117.94
5	Elizabet Tursynbayeva	Kazakhstan	181.32	4	64.31	5	117.01
6	Yura Matsuda	Japan	177.65	7	61.57	6	116.08
7	Nicole Rajičová	Slovakia	167.56	8	57.91	7	109.65
8	Roberta Rodeghiero	Italy	159.80	12	52.57	8	107.23
9	Anastasia Galustyan	Armenia	159.26	9	55.93	9	103.33
10	Angelīna Kučvaļska	Latvia	151.09	11	54.29	10	96.80
11	Kanako Murakami	Japan	151.03	10	55.25	11	95.78
12	Yulia Lipnitskaya	Russia	148.46	3	69.25	12	79.21

=== Pairs ===
Rank	Name	Nation	Total points	SP		FS	
1	Aliona Savchenko / Bruno Massot	Germany	207.89	2	69.51	1	138.38
2	Natalja Zabijako / Alexander Enbert	Russia	197.77	1	69.76	2	128.01
3	Kristina Astakhova / Alexei Rogonov	Russia	188.74	4	65.51	3	123.23
4	Valentina Marchei / Ondřej Hotárek	Italy	187.61	3	66.82	5	120.79
5	Julianne Séguin / Charlie Bilodeau	Canada	183.37	5	61.72	4	121.65
6	Camille Ruest / Andrew Wolfe	Canada	167.19	7	60.09	6	107.10
7	Alisa Efimova / Alexander Korovin	Russia	165.07	6	61.27	7	103.80
8	Goda Butkutė / Nikita Ermolaev	Lithuania	137.08	8	47.39	8	89.69

=== Ice dancing ===
Rank	Name	Nation	Total points	SD		FD	
1	Ekaterina Bobrova / Dmitri Soloviev	Russia	186.68	2	74.92	1	111.76
2	Madison Chock / Evan Bates	United States	182.13	1	75.04	3	107.09
3	Kaitlyn Weaver / Andrew Poje	Canada	178.57	3	69.81	2	108.76
4	Charlène Guignard / Marco Fabbri	Italy	170.45	4	67.72	4	102.73
5	Tiffany Zahorski / Jonathan Guerreiro	Russia	156.95	5	64.28	5	92.67
6	Elliana Pogrebinsky / Alex Benoit	United States	153.92	6	62.93	6	90.99
7	Laurence Fournier Beaudry / Nikolaj Sorensen	Denmark	152.52	7	62.82	7	89.70
8	Alisa Agafonova / Alper Uçar	Turkey	143.90	8	59.31	8	84.59
9	Sofia Evdokimova / Egor Bazin	Russia	133.37	9	55.83	9	77.54
10	Viktoria Kavaliova / Yurii Bieliaiev	Belarus	129.55	10	54.64	10	74.91
