= 2017 Skate America =

- Type: Grand Prix
- Date: November 24 – 26
- Season: 2017–18
- Location: Lake Placid, New York
- Host: U.S. Figure Skating

Champions
- Men's singles: (United States) Nathan Chen
- Ladies' singles: (Japan) Satoko Miyahara
- Pairs: (Germany) Aliona Savchenko / Bruno Massot
- Ice dance: (United States) Maia Shibutani / Alex Shibutani
- Previous: 2016 Skate America
- Next: 2018 Skate America
- Previous Grand Prix: 2017 Internationaux de France
- Next Grand Prix: 2017-18 Grand Prix Final

The 2017 Skate America was the sixth event of six in the 2017–18 ISU Grand Prix of Figure Skating, a senior-level international invitational competition series. It was held in Lake Placid, New York, on November 24–26. Medals were awarded in the disciplines of men's singles, ladies' singles, pair skating, and ice dance. Skaters earned points toward qualifying for the 2017–18 Grand Prix Final.

== Entries ==
The ISU published the preliminary assignments on May 26, 2017.

Country	Men	Ladies	Pairs	Ice dance
Canada	Liam Firus; Kevin Reynolds; Roman Sadovsky	Gabrielle Daleman	Meagan Duhamel / Eric Radford; Kirsten Moore-Towers / Michael Marinaro	Piper Gilles / Paul Poirier
China	Jin Boyang; Yan Han	Li Xiangning	Yu Xiaoyu / Zhang Hao	Wang Shiyue / Liu Xinyu
Germany			Aliona Savchenko / Bruno Massot	
Israel	Daniel Samohin			
Italy				Anna Cappellini / Luca Lanotte
Japan	Takahito Mura	Satoko Miyahara; Kaori Sakamoto		Kana Muramoto / Chris Reed
Russia	Maxim Kovtun; Sergei Voronov	Alena Leonova; Serafima Sakhanovich; Polina Tsurskaya	Natalia Zabiiako / Alexander Enbert	Victoria Sinitsina / Nikita Katsalapov; Tiffany Zahorski / Jonathan Guerreiro
Slovakia		Nicole Rajičová		
United States	Nathan Chen; Ross Miner; Adam Rippon	Karen Chen; Bradie Tennell; Ashley Wagner	Haven Denney / Brandon Frazier; Alexa Scimeca Knierim / Chris Knierim; Deanna Stellato / Nathan Bartholomay	Kaitlin Hawayek / Jean-Luc Baker; Rachel Parsons / Michael Parsons; Maia Shibutani / Alex Shibutani

=== Changes to preliminary assignments ===
Discipline	Withdrew		Added		Notes	Ref.
Discipline	Date	Skater(s)	Date	Skater(s)	Notes	Ref.
Men	—		September 19	(United States) Ross Miner	Host picks	
Ladies	—		September 19	(United States) Bradie Tennell	Host picks	
Pairs	—		September 19	(United States) Deanna Stellato / Nathan Bartholomay	Host picks	
Ice dance	—		September 19	(United States) Rachel Parsons / Michael Parsons	Host picks	
Men	November 10	(Russia) Alexander Petrov	November 13	(Canada) Roman Sadovsky	Injury	
Men	November 16	(South Korea) Cha Jun-hwan	November 16	(China) Yan Han	Focus on injury recovery	
Ladies	November 17	(South Korea) Choi Da-bin	—			
Ladies	November 20	(Russia) Anna Pogorilaya	November 20	(Russia) Serafima Sakhanovich	Focus on injury recovery	
Men	November 22	(Belgium) Jorik Hendrickx	November 22	(Canada) Liam Firus		
Ice dance	November 22	(Israel) Isabella Tobias / Ilia Tkachenko	—			

== Results ==
=== Men ===
Nathan Chen, skating with a left blade that had a nick in the outside edge, won the short program by a 15-point margin over Adam Rippon.

Rippon ranked first in the next segment, finishing 5.6 points ahead of Chen. Before skating, Rippon assisted in removing various insects on the ice. Having replaced the nicked blade, Chen stated, "I think that was a bad call. It was a little too sharp on the inside edge, and every time I pressed into it for sal(chow), toe and even flip, it would catch into the ice way harder than I was used to."

Kovtun withdrew due to a foot injury incurred during the short program and Samohin withdrew after dislocating his left shoulder when he fell on a quad Salchow. Rippon had some pain in his right shoulder after falling on a quad Lutz but was able to continue. Jin skated on two sprained ankles, but still achieved a free skate score and placement high enough to qualify for the Grand Prix final. Chen finished first overall by 9.43 points, Rippon won silver, and Voronov took bronze, with Rafael Arutyunyan coaching the top two.

Rank	Name	Nation	Total points	SP		FS	
1	Nathan Chen	United States	275.88	1	104.12	2	171.76
2	Adam Rippon	United States	266.45	2	89.04	1	177.41
3	Sergei Voronov	Russia	257.49	3	87.51	3	169.98
4	Jin Boyang	China	246.03	6	77.97	4	168.06
5	Yan Han	China	228.33	4	85.97	7	142.36
6	Ross Miner	United States	219.62	8	71.59	5	148.03
7	Takahito Mura	Japan	212.77	7	75.05	8	137.72
8	Liam Firus	Canada	210.83	11	65.17	6	145.66
9	Kevin Reynolds	Canada	204.05	10	69.10	9	134.95
10	Roman Sadovsky	Canada	200.10	9	70.85	10	129.25
WD	Daniel Samohin	Israel	82.28	5	82.28	withdrew	
WD	Maxim Kovtun	Russia	64.98	12	64.98	withdrew	

=== Ladies ===
Miyahara placed first in the short program, Sakamoto was second with a 1.32-point deficit, and Daleman third.

Miyahara, first in the free skate, won gold with a 3.44-point margin over Sakamoto, who won her first Grand Prix medal (in her second appearance on the senior series). Making her senior Grand Prix debut, Tennell rose from fourth after the short program to take the bronze medal. Wagner withdrew due to a skin infection on her ankle.

Rank	Name	Nation	Total points	SP		FS	
1	Satoko Miyahara	Japan	214.03	1	70.72	1	143.31
2	Kaori Sakamoto	Japan	210.59	2	69.40	2	141.19
3	Bradie Tennell	United States	204.10	4	67.01	3	137.09
4	Polina Tsurskaya	Russia	195.56	8	63.20	4	132.36
5	Serafima Sakhanovich	Russia	189.75	5	66.28	5	123.47
6	Gabrielle Daleman	Canada	189.14	3	68.08	8	121.06
7	Alena Leonova	Russia	185.93	7	63.91	7	122.02
8	Karen Chen	United States	182.80	9	59.53	6	123.27
9	Nicole Rajičová	Slovakia	167.61	10	55.43	9	112.18
10	Li Xiangning	China	164.32	11	55.24	10	109.08
WD	Ashley Wagner	United States	64.12	6	64.12	withdrew	

=== Pairs ===
Duhamel/Radford won the short program with a 1.7-point lead over Yu/Zhang.

In the free skate, Savchenko/Massot scored a personal best to win the title although Massot continued to be troubled by back pain. Yu/Zhang took the silver medal while Duhamel/Radford dropped to third.

Rank	Name	Nation	Total points	SP		FS	
1	Aliona Savchenko / Bruno Massot	Germany	223.13	3	72.55	1	150.58
2	Yu Xiaoyu / Zhang Hao	China	219.20	2	73.67	2	145.53
3	Meagan Duhamel / Eric Radford	Canada	215.68	1	75.37	3	140.31
4	Natalia Zabiiako / Alexander Enbert	Russia	197.89	4	70.15	5	127.74
5	Alexa Scimeca Knierim / Chris Knierim	United States	189.07	5	64.27	6	124.80
6	Kirsten Moore-Towers / Michael Marinaro	Canada	187.81	7	59.97	4	127.84
7	Haven Denney / Brandon Frazier	United States	172.16	6	63.04	7	109.12
8	Deanna Stellato / Nathan Bartholomay	United States	165.00	8	57.18	8	107.82

=== Ice dance ===
In the short dance, most teams received lower levels than they expected, with the exception of the Shibutanis, who scored a personal best and placed first with a 6.48-point lead over Cappellini/Lanotte.

The Shibutanis also ranked first in the free dance (by a margin of 6.14 points) and won the gold medal by over 12 points. Cappellini/Lanotte struggled with a lift but finished second overall and qualified to the Grand Prix Final along with the winners.

Rank	Name	Nation	Total points	SP		FS	
1	Maia Shibutani / Alex Shibutani	United States	194.25	1	79.18	1	115.07
2	Anna Cappellini / Luca Lanotte	Italy	181.63	2	72.70	2	108.93
3	Victoria Sinitsina / Nikita Katsalapov	Russia	176.53	3	68.72	3	107.81
4	Piper Gilles / Paul Poirier	Canada	166.54	5	64.07	4	102.47
5	Kaitlin Hawayek / Jean-Luc Baker	United States	163.53	7	62.15	5	101.38
6	Tiffany Zahorski / Jonathan Guerreiro	Russia	160.28	4	64.20	6	96.08
7	Kana Muramoto / Chris Reed	Japan	155.80	6	62.30	8	93.50
8	Wang Shiyue / Liu Xinyu	China	149.36	9	55.57	7	93.79
9	Rachel Parsons / Michael Parsons	United States	145.54	8	58.36	9	87.18
