= Kristina Astakhova =

Russian pair skater

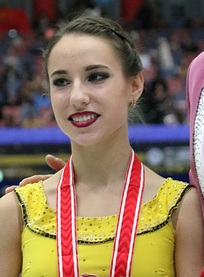

Personal information
- Full name: Kristina Andreyevna Astakhova
- Born: 25 February 1997 (age 29) Moscow, Russia
- Height: 1.56 m (5 ft 1 in)

Figure skating career
- Country: Russia
- Partner: Alexei Rogonov
- Coach: Artur Dmitriev
- Skating club: SDUSHOR 37
- Began skating: 2006
- Retired: 24 June 2018
Medal record
Representing Russia
Figure skating: Pairs
Winter Universiade
| Silver medal – second place | 2015 Granada | Pairs |

Kristina Andreyevna Astakhova (Russian: Кристина Андреевна Астахова; born 25 February 1997) is a Russian former pair skater. With partner Alexei Rogonov, she is the 2015 Winter Universiade silver medalist.

== Career ==
Early in her career, Astakhova competed with Nikita Bochkov. They won the bronze medal at the 2011 Russian Junior Championships and were sent to the 2011 World Junior Championships, where they finished 7th.

In 2012, Astakhova teamed up with Maxim Kurdyukov. They competed together for two seasons.

=== 2014–15 season: Partnership with Rogonov ===
By June 2014, she formed a partnership with Alexei Rogonov, coached by Artur Dmitriev. Astakhova/Rogonov won both of their 2014–15 ISU Challenger Series (CS) events, the 2014 CS Volvo Open Cup and the 2014 CS Golden Spin of Zagreb. In between their CS events they took bronze at the 2014 Rostelecom Cup, their Grand Prix debut. They came in fourth at the 2015 Russian Championships, won silver at the 2015 Winter Universiade, and placed 10th at the 2015 World Championships, competing in the place of Ksenia Stolbova / Fedor Klimov who had withdrawn.

=== 2015–16 season ===
Astakhova/Rogonov started the 2015–16 season on the Challenger Series, taking silver at the 2015 Ondrej Nepela Trophy behind Stolbova/Klimov. Competing on the Grand Prix series, they placed 7th at the 2015 Skate America and 5th at the 2015 Cup of China. After winning silver at the 2015 Golden Spin of Zagreb, Astakhova/Rogonov finished 4th at the 2016 Russian Championships, ahead of Natalja Zabijako / Alexander Enbert. They were selected to compete at the 2016 European Championships after Stolbova/Klimov withdrew due to injury. At the 2016 Europeans Astakhova/Rogonov placed 7th after placing 7th in both the short program and the free skate.

=== 2016–17 season ===
Astakhova/Rogonov won silver at both of their 2016–17 ISU Challenger Series (CS) events, the 2016 CS Finlandia Trophy and the 2016 CS Golden Spin of Zagreb. In between their CS events they skated two Grand Prix competitions. They placed 6th at the 2016 Skate America but took the bronze medal at the 2016 Rostelecom Cup. Later they came in fourth at the 2017 Russian Championships.

=== 2017–18 season ===
Astakhova/Rogonov started their season by taking silver medal at their first 2017–18 ISU Challenger Series event, the 2017 CS Ondrej Nepela Trophy They then finished 5th at the 2017 CS Finlandia Trophy. Competing on the Grand Prix series, they won two bronze medals, first at the 2017 Rostelecom Cup and then at the 2017 NHK Trophy where they scored their personal best score of 203.64 points. This was the first international event where they scored above 200 points. They then skated their 3rd CS event, the 2017 CS Golden Spin of Zagreb where they won their 2nd CS series silver of the season. In December 2017 they placed 4th at the 2018 Russian Championships. This was the 4th consecutive time that they had placed 4th at the Russian Championships.

it was announced by the Russian Figure Skating Federation on January 23, 2018, that Ksenia Stolbova wasn't invited to the 2018 Olympics. Because of this Astakhova/Rogonov were sent instead. Astakhova/Rogonov placed 12th at the 2018 Winter Olympics. Later they placed 8th at the 2018 World Championships.

== Programs ==
=== With Rogonov ===
| Season | Short program | Free skating | Exhibition |
|---|---|---|---|
| 2017–18 | Adagio for Strings by Samuel Barber; Requiem in D Minor by Wolfgang Amadeus Mozart; O Fortuna (from Carmina Burana) by Carl Orff | La La Land medley; Another Day of Sun; City Of Stars; Epilogue by Justin Hurwitz | Juno and Avos (opera) by Alexey Rybnikov; Shatter Me by Lindsey Stirling ft. Lzzy Hale |
| 2016–17 | Eugene Onegin; Io Ti Penso Amore (from Paganini vs Garrett) by David Garrett, Nicole Scherzinger | The Storm by Balázs Havasi; Le Bien qui fait mal (from Mozart, l'opéra rock) | Eugene Onegin |
| 2015–16 | The Artist by Ludovic Bource | Shatter Me by Lindsey Stirling ft. Lzzy Hale; The Storm by Balázs Havasi | Romans (Ya Tebya Nikogda Ne Zabudu) by Ariana |
| 2014–15 | Be Italian (from Nine) performed by Fergie | The Master and Margarita by Igor Kornelyuk | Romans (Ya Tebya Nikogda Ne Zabudu) by Ariana |

=== With Kurdyukov ===
| Season | Short program | Free skating |
|---|---|---|
| 2013–14 | Inception by Hans Zimmer | Heart of Courage by Two Steps from Hell; Avatar by James Horner |
| 2012–13 | Tango Amore by Edvin Marton | Heart of Courage by Two Steps from Hell; Avatar by James Horner |

=== With Bochkov ===
| Season | Short program | Free skating |
|---|---|---|
| 2010–11 | Tango Amore by Edvin Marton | Angels and Demons by Hans Zimmer |

== Competitive highlights ==
GP: Grand Prix; CS: Challenger Series; JGP: Junior Grand Prix

=== With Rogonov ===
International
| Event | 2014–15 | 2015–16 | 2016–17 | 2017–18 |
|---|---|---|---|---|
| Olympics | | | | 12th |
| Worlds | 10th | | | 8th |
| Europeans | | 7th | | |
| GP Cup of China | | 5th | | |
| GP NHK Trophy | | | | 3rd |
| GP Rostelecom Cup | 3rd | | 3rd | 3rd |
| GP Skate America | | 7th | 5th | |
| CS Finlandia Trophy | | | 2nd | 5th |
| CS Golden Spin | 1st | 2nd | 2nd | 2nd |
| CS Nepela Trophy | | 2nd | | 2nd |
| CS Volvo Cup | 1st | | | |
| Shanghai Trophy | | | | 4th |
| Universiade | 2nd | | | |
| Volvo Open Cup | 1st | | | |
National
| Russian Champ. | 4th | 4th | 4th | 4th |

=== With Kurdyukov ===
International
| Event | 2012–13 | 2013–14 |
|---|---|---|
| Ice Star | | 1st |
National
| Russian Championships | 10th | 9th |

=== With Bochkov ===
International
| Event | 2010–11 |
|---|---|
| World Junior Championships | 7th |
| JGP Austria | 9th |
National
| Russian Junior Championships | 3rd |

== Detailed results ==
=== With Rogonov ===
2017–18 season
| Date | Event | SP | FS | Total |
| 19–25 March 2018 | 2018 World Championships | 7; 71.62 | 9; 130.54 | 8; 202.16 |
| 14–25 February 2018 | 2018 Winter Olympics | 10; 70.52 | 13; 123.93 | 12; 194.45 |
| 21–24 December 2017 | 2018 Russian Championships | 4; 69.65 | 4; 128.76 | 4; 198.41 |
| 6–9 December 2017 | 2017 CS Golden Spin of Zagreb | 2; 66.30 | 2; 120.32 | 2; 186.62 |
| 24–26 November 2017 | 2017 Shanghai Trophy | – | 4; 125.75 | 4; 125.75 |
| 10–12 November 2017 | 2017 NHK Trophy | 3; 70.47 | 3; 133.17 | 3; 203.64 |
| 20–22 October 2017 | 2017 Rostelecom Cup | 4; 67.14 | 3; 131.97 | 3; 199.11 |
| 6–8 October 2017 | 2017 CS Finlandia Trophy | 5; 64.13 | 5; 112.75 | 5; 176.88 |
| 21–23 September 2017 | 2017 CS Ondrej Nepela Trophy | 1; 67.18 | 2; 123.94 | 2; 191.12 |
2016–17 season
| Date | Event | SP | FS | Total |
| 20–26 December 2016 | 2017 Russian Championships | 4; 70.73 | 4; 128.06 | 4; 198.79 |
| 7–10 December 2016 | 2016 CS Golden Spin of Zagreb | 2; 63.82 | 1; 116.62 | 2; 180.44 |
| 4–6 November 2016 | 2016 Rostelecom Cup | 4; 65.51 | 3; 123.23 | 3; 188.74 |
| 21–23 October 2016 | 2016 Skate America | 5; 64.34 | 6; 110.18 | 5; 174.52 |
| 6–10 October 2016 | 2016 CS Finlandia Trophy | 2; 57.26 | 2; 111.84 | 2; 169.10 |
2015–16 season
| Date | Event | SP | FS | Total |
| 26–31 January 2016 | 2016 European Championships | 7; 60.63 | 7; 114.09 | 7; 174.72 |
| 23–27 December 2015 | 2016 Russian Championships | 4; 71.89 | 4; 134.50 | 4; 206.39 |
| 2–5 December 2015 | 2015 CS Golden Spin of Zagreb | 2; 65.06 | 3; 118.82 | 2; 183.88 |
| 6–8 November 2015 | 2015 Cup of China | 6; 59.17 | 5; 114.19 | 5; 173.36 |
| 23–25 October 2015 | 2015 Skate America | 7; 58.25 | 8; 99.72 | 7; 157.97 |
| 1–3 October 2015 | 2015 CS Ondrej Nepela Trophy | 3; 60.50 | 1; 124.50 | 2; 185.00 |
2014–15 season
| Date | Event | SP | FS | Total |
| 23–29 March 2015 | 2015 World Championships | 13; 55.55 | 9; 118.03 | 10; 173.58 |
| 4–8 February 2015 | 2015 Winter Universiade | 2; 59.88 | 2; 114.99 | 2; 174.87 |
| 24–28 December 2014 | 2015 Russian Championships | 6; 57.63 | 4; 116.89 | 4; 174.52 |
| 4–6 December 2014 | 2014 CS Golden Spin of Zagreb | 1; 56.58 | 1; 127.66 | 1; 184.24 |
| 14–15 November 2014 | 2014 Rostelecom Cup | 3; 58.34 | 4; 106.52 | 3; 164.86 |
| 5–9 November 2014 | 2014 CS Volvo Open Cup | 1; 60.28 | 1; 110.06 | 1; 170.34 |
