= Anastasiya Galustyan =

Russian-Armenian figure skater (born 1999)

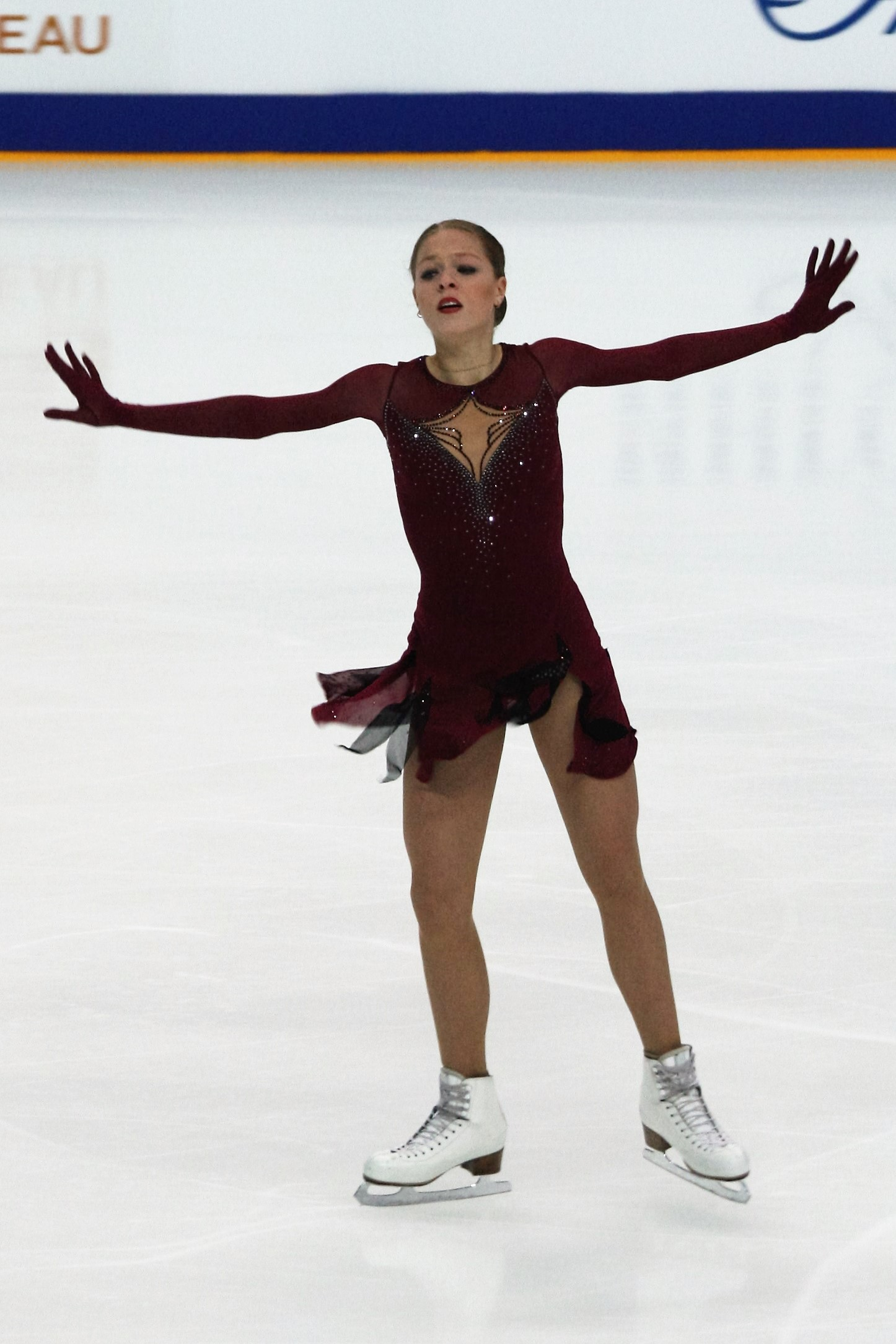
- Galustyan in 2016

Personal information
- Full name: Anastasiya Georgievna Galustyan
- Other names: Anastasia
- Born: 25 June 1999 (age 27) Moscow, Russia
- Home town: Moscow, Russia
- Height: 1.73 m (5 ft 8 in)

Figure skating career
- Country: Armenia
- Coach: Irina Galustyan; Georgy Galustyan
- Began skating: 2003

Anastasiya Georgievna Galustyan (Armenian: Անաստասիա Գալուստյան, Russian: Анастасия Георгиевна Галустян, born 25 June 1999) is a Russian-Armenian figure skater who represents Armenia in ladies' singles. She is the 2014 CS Warsaw Cup silver medalist, the 2019 Santa Claus Cup champion, the 2015 CS Warsaw Cup bronze medalist, the 2016 Toruń Cup silver medalist, and the 2014 Tallinn Trophy silver medalist.

She placed 10th at the 2016 Winter Youth Olympics.

== Personal life ==
Galustyan was born 25 June 1999 in Moscow, Russia. Both of her parents are figure skating coaches.

== Career ==
Galustyan originally competed for Russia, but has represented Armenia since 2012.

=== 2013–2014 season ===
Galustyan debuted on the ISU Junior Grand Prix (JGP) series, finishing 7th in Košice, Slovakia in September 2013, and 10th in Ostrava, Czech Republic the next month. She made her senior international debut in December, placing 5th at the Ukrainian Open. In March 2014, she competed at her first ISU Championship, the World Junior Championships in Sofia, Bulgaria, but was eliminated after placing 27th in the short program.

=== 2014–2015 season ===
During the 2014 JGP series, Galustyan placed 8th in Tallinn, Estonia, and 12th in Zagreb, Croatia. Competing on the senior level, she finished 6th at the 2014 Volvo Open Cup and won silver at the 2014 Warsaw Cup, both ISU Challenger Series (CS) events, and then took silver at the Tallinn Trophy. In January 2015, she placed 7th at the European Youth Olympic Festival in Austria and then qualified for the first time to an ISU Championship free skate, at the European Championships in Stockholm, Sweden, where she finished 13th.

In March, Galustyan finished 12th at the World Junior Championships in Tallinn, Estonia, but missed the cut-off for the free skate at the World Championships in Shanghai, China, having placed 29th in the short program.

=== 2015–2016 season ===
Competing in the 2015 JGP series, Galustyan placed 11th in Colorado Springs, Colorado and 9th in Logroño, Spain. She then appeared at a pair of Challenger Series events, placing fourth at the 2015 Mordovian Ornament and taking bronze at the 2015 Warsaw Cup. In January 2016, she won silver at the Toruń Cup and finished 15th at the European Championships in Bratislava, Slovakia, having placed 16th in the short program and 13th in the free skate.

In February, Galustyan represented Armenia at the 2016 Winter Youth Olympics in Lillehammer, placing 7th in the short, 11th in the free, and 10th overall. In March, she finished 16th at the 2016 World Junior Championships in Debrecen, Hungary, after ranking 9th in the short and 16th in the free. In April, she placed 20th in the short, 24th in the free, and 24th overall at the 2016 World Championships in Boston.

=== 2016–2017 season ===
After finishing ninth at the 2016 CS Autumn Classic International, Galustyan debuted on the ISU Grand Prix of Figure Skating circuit, placing 9th at the 2016 Rostelecom Cup and 11th at the 2016 Trophée de France.

At the 2017 European Figure Skating Championships in Ostrava, Galustyan finished in a career-high placement of 12th. Later in Helsinki, she concluded the season with a 23rd place finish at the 2017 World Figure Skating Championships.

=== 2017–2018 season ===
Galustyan began the 2017-18 season at the 2017 CS Lombardia Trophy, finishing in 19th place. At the 2017 CS Nebelhorn Trophy, Galustyan failed to qualify Armenia a place to the 2018 Winter Olympics. After placing 15th in the short program, Galustyan jumped to 7th in the free program, finishing 8th overall and one place short of an Olympic qualifying position. Armenia is subsequently the first alternate for a place in ladies singles at the Olympic Games.

On the 2017–18 ISU Grand Prix of Figure Skating circuit, Galustyan placed 12th at the Rostelecom Cup.

On 14 January 2018, she withdrew from the 2018 European Figure Skating Championships in Moscow, Russia.

== Programs ==
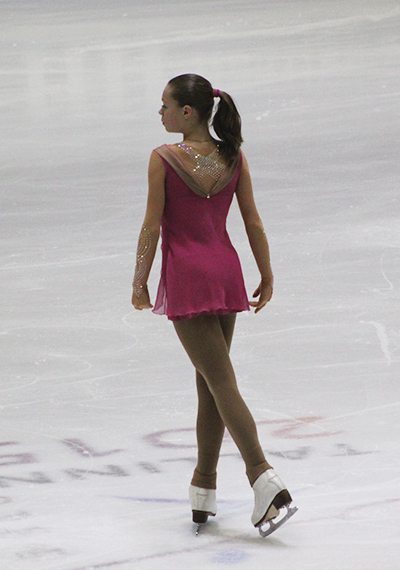
Galustyan in 2015

Season	Short program	Free skating	Exhibition
2020–2021	Anastasia (soundtrack)	Corpse Bride (soundtrack)	
2020–2021	L.O.V.E performed by Frank Sinatra and Natalie Cole	The Nutcracker by Pyotr Tchaikovsky	
2019–2020	Je t'aime by Lara Fabian	Corpse Bride by Danny Elfman	
2017–2018	I Dreamed a Dream (from Les Misérables) performed by Susan Boyle	Nos souvenirs (Memories) (from Cats) by Andrew Lloyd Webber performed by Mireille Mathieu	
2016–2017	I Dreamed a Dream (from Les Misérables); Seventeen Moments of Spring by Mikael Tariverdiev	The Color of the Night by Lauren Christy	Seventeen Moments of Spring by Mikael Tariverdiev
2015–2016	Once Upon a December (from Anastasia) by David Newman	Les Deux Guitares by Paul Mauriat	
2014–2015	Une Vie d'Amour by Charles Aznavour	Mouse Hunt by Alan Silvestri	
2013–2014	Summer (from The Four Seasons) by Antonio Vivaldi	Tango (from The Addams Family) by Marc Shaiman	

== Competitive highlights ==
GP: Grand Prix; CS: Challenger Series; JGP: Junior Grand Prix

International
Event	13–14	14–15	15–16	16–17	17–18	18–19	19–20	20-21	21-22
Worlds		29th	24th	23rd		39th	C	WD	
Europeans		13th	15th	12th	WD	22nd	27th		
GP France				11th					
GP Rostelecom				9th	12th			WD	
CS Autumn Classic				9th					
CS Lombardia					19th		WD		
CS Mordovian			4th						
CS Nebelhorn					8th				WD
CS Tallinn Trophy						9th			
CS U.S. Classic							WD		
CS Volvo Cup		6th							
CS Warsaw Cup		2nd	3rd						
Denis Ten Memorial							6th		
Hellmut Seibt	12th								
Ice Star						4th			
Int. Challenge Cup				6th					
Open Ice Mall						3rd			
Prague Ice Cup							3rd		
Santa Claus Cup							1st		
Tallinn Trophy		2nd							
Toruń Cup			2nd	3rd			WD		
Ukrainian Open	5th								
Winter Universiade						8th			
International: Junior
Youth Olympics			10th						
Junior Worlds	27th	12th	16th						
JGP Croatia		12th							
JGP Czech Republic	10th								
JGP Estonia		8th							
JGP Slovakia	7th								
JGP Spain			9th						
JGP U.S.			11th						
EYOF		7th							
National
Armenian Championships		1st	1st	1st	1st				
TBD = Assigned; WD = Withdrew; C = Event cancelled
