= 2017 NHK Trophy =

Figure skating competition

- Type: Grand Prix
- Date: November 10 – 12
- Season: 2017–18
- Location: Osaka
- Host: Japan Skating Federation

Champions
- Men's singles: (Russia) Sergei Voronov
- Ladies' singles: (Russia) Evgenia Medvedeva
- Pairs: (China) Sui Wenjing / Han Cong
- Ice dance: (Canada) Tessa Virtue / Scott Moir
- Previous: 2016 NHK Trophy
- Next: 2018 NHK Trophy
- Previous Grand Prix: 2017 Cup of China
- Next Grand Prix: 2017 Internationaux de France

The 2017 NHK Trophy was the 4th event of six in the 2017–18 ISU Grand Prix of Figure Skating, a senior-level international invitational competition series. It was held in Osaka on November 10–12. Medals were awarded in the disciplines of men's singles, ladies' singles, pair skating, and ice dance. Skaters earned points toward qualifying for the 2017–18 Grand Prix Final.

== Records ==
The following new ISU best scores were set during this competition:

| Event | Component | Skater(s) | Score | Date | Ref |
|---|---|---|---|---|---|
| Pairs | Free skate | (China) Sui Wenjing / Han Cong | 155.10 | 11 November 2017 | |

== Entries ==
The ISU published the preliminary assignments on May 26, 2017.

| Country | Men | Ladies | Pairs | Ice dance |
|---|---|---|---|---|
| Austria | | | Miriam Ziegler / Severin Kiefer | |
| Canada | Keegan Messing; Nam Nguyen | Alaine Chartrand | Julianne Séguin / Charlie Bilodeau | Tessa Virtue / Scott Moir |
| China | | | Sui Wenjing / Han Cong | |
| Czech Republic | Michal Březina | | | |
| Denmark | | | | Laurence Fournier Beaudry / Nikolaj Sørensen |
| France | | | | Marie-Jade Lauriault / Romain Le Gac |
| Israel | Oleksii Bychenko | | | |
| Italy | | Carolina Kostner | | Anna Cappellini / Luca Lanotte |
| Japan | Hiroaki Sato; Kazuki Tomono | Rika Hongo; Satoko Miyahara; Yuna Shiraiwa | Sumire Suto / Francis Boudreau-Audet; Miu Suzaki / Ryuichi Kihara | Misato Komatsubara / Timothy Koleto; Kana Muramoto / Chris Reed |
| Latvia | Deniss Vasiļjevs | | | |
| Russia | Dmitri Aliev; Sergei Voronov | Alena Leonova; Evgenia Medvedeva; Polina Tsurskaya | Kristina Astakhova / Alexei Rogonov; Ksenia Stolbova / Fedor Klimov | Victoria Sinitsina / Nikita Katsalapov |
| Slovakia | | Nicole Rajičová | | |
| South Korea | | Park So-youn | | |
| Ukraine | | | | Oleksandra Nazarova / Maxim Nikitin |
| United Kingdom | | | | Penny Coomes / Nicholas Buckland |
| United States | Jason Brown; Adam Rippon | Mariah Bell; Mirai Nagasu | Alexa Scimeca Knierim / Chris Knierim | Madison Hubbell / Zachary Donohue |

=== Changes to preliminary assignments ===
| Discipline | Withdrew | | Added | | Notes | Ref. |
| Discipline | Date | Skater(s) | Date | Skater(s) | Notes | Ref. |
|---|---|---|---|---|---|---|
| Men | —N/a | | August 23 | (Japan) Hiroaki Sato | Host picks | |
| Pairs | —N/a | | September 19 | (Japan) Miu Suzaki / Ryuichi Kihara | Host picks | |
| Ice dance | —N/a | | September 19 | (Japan) Misato Komatsubara / Timothy Koleto | Host picks | |
| Men | September 22 | (United States) Joshua Farris | September 29 | (Canada) Nam Nguyen | | |
| Men | November 3 | (Canada) Patrick Chan | November 3 | (Canada) Keegan Messing | Focus on preparing for Canadian Nationals | |
| Men | November 6 | (Japan) Daisuke Murakami | November 6 | (Japan) Kazuki Tomono | Pneumonia | |
| Ice dance | November 8 | (Israel) Isabella Tobias / Ilia Tkachenko | November 8 | (United Kingdom) Penny Coomes / Nicholas Buckland | | |
| Men | November 10 | (Japan) Yuzuru Hanyu | —N/a | | Injury | |

== Results ==
=== Men ===
| Rank | Name | Nation | Total points | SP | | FS | |
|---|---|---|---|---|---|---|---|
| 1 | Sergei Voronov | Russia | 271.12 | 1 | 90.06 | 1 | 181.06 |
| 2 | Adam Rippon | United States | 261.99 | 4 | 84.95 | 2 | 177.04 |
| 3 | Alexei Bychenko | Israel | 252.07 | 2 | 85.52 | 3 | 166.55 |
| 4 | Jason Brown | United States | 245.95 | 3 | 85.36 | 4 | 160.59 |
| 5 | Keegan Messing | Canada | 235.80 | 5 | 80.13 | 6 | 155.67 |
| 6 | Deniss Vasiļjevs | Latvia | 234.80 | 8 | 76.51 | 5 | 158.29 |
| 7 | Kazuki Tomono | Japan | 231.93 | 6 | 79.88 | 7 | 152.05 |
| 8 | Dmitri Aliev | Russia | 223.45 | 7 | 77.51 | 9 | 145.94 |
| 9 | Michal Březina | Czech Republic | 220.45 | 9 | 76.24 | 10 | 144.21 |
| 10 | Nam Nguyen | Canada | 214.51 | 11 | 65.82 | 8 | 148.69 |
| 11 | Hiroaki Sato | Japan | 199.20 | 10 | 75.95 | 11 | 123.25 |

=== Ladies ===
| Rank | Name | Nation | Total points | SP | | FS | |
|---|---|---|---|---|---|---|---|
| 1 | Evgenia Medvedeva | Russia | 224.39 | 1 | 79.99 | 1 | 144.40 |
| 2 | Carolina Kostner | Italy | 212.24 | 2 | 74.57 | 3 | 137.67 |
| 3 | Polina Tsurskaya | Russia | 210.19 | 3 | 70.04 | 2 | 140.15 |
| 4 | Mirai Nagasu | United States | 194.46 | 5 | 65.17 | 4 | 129.29 |
| 5 | Satoko Miyahara | Japan | 191.80 | 6 | 65.05 | 6 | 126.75 |
| 6 | Alena Leonova | Russia | 190.95 | 7 | 63.61 | 5 | 127.34 |
| 7 | Rika Hongo | Japan | 187.83 | 4 | 65.83 | 7 | 122.00 |
| 8 | Yuna Shiraiwa | Japan | 171.94 | 8 | 57.34 | 8 | 114.60 |
| 9 | Mariah Bell | United States | 166.04 | 9 | 57.25 | 10 | 108.79 |
| 10 | Nicole Rajičová | Slovakia | 159.78 | 10 | 53.36 | 11 | 106.42 |
| 11 | Alaine Chartrand | Canada | 159.36 | 12 | 49.60 | 9 | 109.76 |
| 12 | Park So-youn | South Korea | 135.79 | 11 | 51.54 | 12 | 84.25 |

=== Pairs ===
| Rank | Name | Nation | Total points | SP | | FS | |
|---|---|---|---|---|---|---|---|
| 1 | Sui Wenjing / Han Cong | China | 234.53 | 1 | 79.43 | 1 | 155.10 |
| 2 | Ksenia Stolbova / Fedor Klimov | Russia | 222.74 | 2 | 75.05 | 2 | 147.69 |
| 3 | Kristina Astakhova / Alexei Rogonov | Russia | 203.64 | 3 | 70.47 | 3 | 133.17 |
| 4 | Julianne Séguin / Charlie Bilodeau | Canada | 194.37 | 5 | 63.98 | 4 | 130.39 |
| 5 | Alexa Scimeca Knierim / Chris Knierim | United States | 192.51 | 4 | 65.86 | 5 | 126.65 |
| 6 | Miriam Ziegler / Severin Kiefer | Austria | 171.13 | 6 | 62.61 | 6 | 108.52 |
| 7 | Sumire Suto / Francis Boudreau-Audet | Japan | 156.52 | 7 | 51.69 | 7 | 104.83 |
| 8 | Miu Suzaki / Ryuichi Kihara | Japan | 139.98 | 8 | 44.83 | 8 | 95.15 |

=== Ice dance ===
| Rank | Name | Nation | Total points | SD | | FD | |
|---|---|---|---|---|---|---|---|
| 1 | Tessa Virtue / Scott Moir | Canada | 198.64 | 1 | 80.92 | 1 | 117.72 |
| 2 | Madison Hubbell / Zachary Donohue | United States | 188.35 | 2 | 76.31 | 2 | 112.04 |
| 3 | Anna Cappellini / Luca Lanotte | Italy | 186.56 | 3 | 75.87 | 3 | 110.69 |
| 4 | Victoria Sinitsina / Nikita Katsalapov | Russia | 177.15 | 4 | 72.49 | 4 | 104.66 |
| 5 | Laurence Fournier Beaudry / Nikolaj Sørensen | Denmark | 164.40 | 6 | 65.34 | 5 | 99.06 |
| 6 | Alexandra Nazarova / Maxim Nikitin | Ukraine | 160.88 | 7 | 63.33 | 6 | 97.55 |
| 7 | Penny Coomes / Nicholas Buckland | United Kingdom | 158.15 | 5 | 65.64 | 9 | 92.51 |
| 8 | Marie-Jade Lauriault / Romain Le Gac | France | 157.62 | 8 | 62.79 | 7 | 94.83 |
| 9 | Kana Muramoto / Chris Reed | Japan | 156.41 | 9 | 61.82 | 8 | 94.59 |
| 10 | Misato Komatsubara / Timothy Koleto | Japan | 132.41 | 10 | 53.83 | 10 | 78.58 |
