= 2017 CS Golden Spin of Zagreb =

- Type: ISU Challenger Series
- Date: December 6 – 9
- Season: 2017–18
- Location: Zagreb
- Host: Croatian Skating Federation
- Venue: Dom sportova

Champions
- Men's singles: (Georgia (country)) Moris Kvitelashvili
- Ladies' singles: (Russia) Stanislava Konstantinova
- Pairs: (Russia) Natalia Zabiiako / Alexander Enbert
- Ice dance: (Russia) Ekaterina Bobrova / Dmitri Soloviev
- Previous: 2016 CS Golden Spin of Zagreb
- Next: 2018 CS Golden Spin of Zagreb

The 2017 CS Golden Spin of Zagreb was the 50th edition of the annual senior-level international figure skating competition held in Zagreb, Croatia. It was held at the Dom sportova in December 2017 as part of the 2017–18 ISU Challenger Series. Medals were awarded in the disciplines of men's singles, ladies' singles, pair skating, and ice dance.

== Entries ==
The International Skating Union published the preliminary entries on 21 November 2017.

Country	Men	Ladies	Pairs	Ice dance
Armenia				Tina Garabedian / Simon Proulx-Sénécal
Austria	Luc Maierhofer			
Azerbaijan			Sofiya Karagodina / Semyon Stepanov	
Belarus		Katsiarina Pakhamovich		Anna Kublikova / Yuri Hulitski
Bulgaria				Teodora Markova / Simon Dazé
Croatia	Nicholas Vrdoljak	Patricia Skopančić		
Czech Republic	Petr Kotlařík			
Finland			Liubov Efimenko / Matthew Penasse	
Georgia	Moris Kvitelashvili; Irakli Maysuradze			
Germany		Lea Johanna Dastich; Nicole Schott		Shari Koch / Christian Nüchtern; Kavita Lorenz / Joti Polizoakis; Katharina Müller / Tim Dieck
Hong Kong	Kwun Hung Leung			
Israel	Oleksii Bychenko	Michelle Lifshits; Elena Rivkina		Adel Tankova / Ronald Zilberberg
Italy	Daniel Grassl; Jari Kessler; Ivan Righini	Elisabetta Leccardi		Charlène Guignard / Marco Fabbri
Japan			Riku Miura / Soya Ichihashi	
Kazakhstan	Denis Ten			
Netherlands	Thomas Kennes	Kyarha van Tiel		
New Zealand		Sarah Isabella Bardua		
Norway	Sondre Oddvoll Bøe	Camilla Gjersem		
Poland		Colette Coco Kaminski		
Russia	Artur Dmitriev Jr. Andrei Lazukin; Alexander Petrov	Alisa Fedichkina; Stanislava Konstantinova; Elizaveta Tuktamysheva	Kristina Astakhova / Alexei Rogonov; Natalia Zabiiako / Alexander Enbert	Ekaterina Bobrova / Dmitri Soloviev; Alla Loboda / Pavel Drozd; Tiffany Zahorski / Jonathan Guerreiro
Slovenia		Daša Grm		
Slovakia				Lucie Myslivečková / Lukáš Csölley
Spain	Felipe Montoya; Javier Raya			Sara Hurtado / Kirill Khaliavin; Celia Robledo / Luis Fenero; Olivia Smart / Adrià Díaz
Sweden	Alexander Majorov			
Switzerland			Ioulia Chtchetinina / Mikhail Akulov	Victoria Manni / Carlo Röthlisberger
Turkey				Alisa Agafonova / Alper Uçar
United Kingdom				Robynne Tweedale / Joseph Buckland
United States	Alexander Johnson	Starr Andrews; Emmy Ma; Hannah Miller	Tarah Kayne / Daniel O'Shea	Kaitlin Hawayek / Jean-Luc Baker; Rachel Parsons / Michael Parsons

== Results ==
=== Men ===
Rank	Name	Nation	Total points	SP		FS	
1	Moris Kvitelashvili	Georgia	236.67	6	76.24	1	160.43
2	Oleksii Bychenko	Israel	231.81	4	77.88	3	153.93
3	Artur Dmitriev	Russia	229.74	5	77.35	4	152.39
4	Denis Ten	Kazakhstan	228.81	1	80.50	5	148.31
5	Ivan Righini	Italy	225.53	2	79.68	8	145.85
6	Andrei Lazukin	Russia	224.75	9	69.56	2	155.19
7	Alexander Majorov	Sweden	223.23	7	75.23	6	148.00
8	Alexander Petrov	Russia	220.59	8	74.44	7	146.15
9	Alexander Johnson	United States	218.88	3	78.80	9	140.08
10	Daniel Grassl	Italy	207.12	10	68.25	10	138.87
11	Felipe Montoya	Spain	193.09	11	65.70	11	127.39
12	Irakli Maysuradze	Georgia	178.08	12	60.72	12	117.36
13	Nicholas Vrdoljak	Croatia	174.11	15	58.22	13	115.89
14	Petr Kotlařík	Czech Republic	171.17	14	58.82	14	112.35
15	Javier Raya	Spain	166.48	13	60.46	15	106.02
16	Sondre Oddvoll Boe	Norway	156.40	17	55.14	16	101.26
17	Thomas Kennes	Netherlands	156.04	16	57.43	18	98.61
18	Jari Kessler	Italy	151.94	18	50.87	17	101.07
19	Kwun Hung Leung	Hong Kong	126.36	19	42.58	19	83.78

=== Ladies ===
Rank	Name	Nation	Total points	SP		FS	
1	Stanislava Konstantinova	Russia	199.68	2	67.47	1	132.21
2	Alisa Fedichkina	Russia	178.90	3	67.06	4	111.14
3	Elizaveta Tuktamysheva	Russia	175.90	1	68.47	5	107.43
4	Nicole Schott	Germany	167.36	5	55.91	3	111.45
5	Emmy Ma	United States	166.71	9	49.63	2	117.08
6	Starr Andrews	United States	163.49	4	60.80	7	102.69
7	Lea Johanna Dastich	Germany	157.44	7	51.77	6	105.67
8	Hannah Miller	United States	149.46	8	51.22	8	98.24
9	Dasa Grm	Slovenia	142.97	10	45.30	9	97.67
10	Elisabetta Leccardi	Italy	139.99	6	52.40	10	87.59
11	Kyarha van Tiel	Netherlands	117.24	12	41.85	11	75.39
12	Camilla Gjersem	Norway	115.14	13	41.46	12	73.68
13	Michelle Lifshits	Israel	114.56	11	43.37	13	71.19
14	Colette Coco Kaminski	Poland	93.11	14	34.45	14	58.66
15	Katsiarina Pakhamovich	Belarus	82.79	15	28.79	17	54.00
16	Sarah Isabella Bardua	New Zealand	80.87	16	25.17	15	55.70
17	Elena Rivkina	Israel	79.84	17	24.94	16	54.90
18	Patricia Skopancic	Croatia	75.25	18	24.52	18	50.73

=== Pairs ===
Rank	Name	Nation	Total points	SP		FS	
1	Natalia Zabiiako / Alexander Enbert	Russia	202.96	1	68.76	1	134.20
2	Kristina Astakhova / Alexei Rogonov	Russia	186.62	2	66.30	2	120.32
3	Tarah Kayne / Daniel O'Shea	United States	162.26	3	56.38	3	105.88
4	Ioulia Chtchetinina / Mikhail Akulov	Switzerland	134.97	4	46.46	4	88.51
5	Sofiya Karagodina / Semyon Stepanov	Azerbaijan	130.68	5	45.04	5	85.64
6	Riku Miura / Shoya Ichihashi	Japan	119.24	6	43.84	6	75.40

=== Ice dance ===
Rank	Name	Nation	Total points	SD		FD	
1	Ekaterina Bobrova / Dmitri Soloviev	Russia	186.66	1	75.50	1	111.16
2	Charlene Guignard / Marco Fabbri	Italy	178.16	2	71.78	2	106.38
3	Kaitlin Hawayek / Jean-Luc Baker	United States	163.88	4	63.58	3	100.30
4	Sara Hurtado / Kirill Khaliavin	Spain	163.58	3	67.14	4	96.44
5	Olivia Smart / Adria Diaz	Spain	159.40	5	63.12	5	96.28
6	Tiffany Zahorski / Jonathan Guerreiro	Russia	157.84	6	62.92	6	94.92
7	Alisa Agafonova / Alper Ucar	Turkey	154.38	8	61.38	7	93.00
8	Rachel Parsons / Michael Parsons	United States	152.38	9	60.18	8	92.20
9	Kavita Lorenz / Joti Polizoakis	Germany	150.42	10	60.02	10	90.40
10	Alla Loboda / Pavel Drozd	Russia	150.32	11	59.42	9	90.90
11	Katharina Müller / Tim Dieck	Germany	149.02	7	61.84	12	87.18
12	Robynne Tweedale / Joseph Buckland	United Kingdom	143.82	13	55.52	11	88.30
13	Shari Koch / Christian Nüchtern	Germany	141.18	12	56.72	13	84.46
14	Celia Robledo / Luis Fenero	Spain	135.10	14	52.98	14	82.12
15	Tina Garabedian / Simon Proulx-Sénécal	Armenia	127.78	15	49.42	15	78.36
16	Anna Kublikova / Yuri Hulitski	Belarus	119.42	16	46.78	16	72.64
17	Adel Tankova / Ronald Zilberberg	Israel	110.40	18	41.74	17	68.66
18	Victoria Manni / Carlo Röthlisberger	Switzerland	108.40	17	42.04	18	66.36
19	Teodora Markova / Simon Daze	Bulgaria	102.32	19	39.42	19	62.90
