= 2017 Rostelecom Cup =

- Type: Grand Prix
- Date: October 20 – 22
- Season: 2017–18
- Location: Moscow, Russia
- Host: Figure Skating Federation of Russia
- Venue: Megasport Arena

Champions
- Men's singles: (United States) Nathan Chen
- Ladies' singles: (Russia) Evgenia Medvedeva
- Pairs: (Russia) Evgenia Tarasova / Vladimir Morozov
- Ice dance: (United States) Maia Shibutani / Alex Shibutani
- Previous: 2016 Rostelecom Cup
- Next: 2018 Rostelecom Cup
- Next Grand Prix: 2017 Skate Canada International

The 2017 Rostelecom Cup was the first event of six in the 2017–18 ISU Grand Prix of Figure Skating, a senior-level international invitational competition series. It was held at the Megasport Arena in Moscow on October 20–22. Medals were awarded in the disciplines of men's singles, ladies' singles, pair skating, and ice dance. Skaters earned points toward qualifying for the 2017–18 Grand Prix Final.

== Entries ==
The ISU published the preliminary assignments on May 26, 2017.

Country	Men	Ladies	Pairs	Ice dance
Armenia		Anastasia Galustyan		
Austria			Miriam Ziegler / Severin Kiefer	
Canada	Nam Nguyen		Julianne Séguin / Charlie Bilodeau	Piper Gilles / Paul Poirier
Czech Republic				Nicole Kuzmichová / Alexandr Sinicyn
France		Maé-Bérénice Méité		Marie-Jade Lauriault / Romain Le Gac
Georgia	Moris Kvitelashvili			
Germany		Nicole Schott		
Israel	Daniel Samohin			
Italy		Carolina Kostner	Valentina Marchei / Ondřej Hotárek	Charlène Guignard / Marco Fabbri
Japan	Yuzuru Hanyu	Wakaba Higuchi; Kaori Sakamoto	Sumire Suto / Francis Boudreau-Audet	
Kazakhstan	Denis Ten	Elizabet Tursynbayeva		
Latvia	Deniss Vasiļjevs			
Russia	Dmitri Aliev; Mikhail Kolyada; Andrei Lazukin	Evgenia Medvedeva; Valeria Mikhailova; Elena Radionova	Kristina Astakhova / Alexei Rogonov; Ksenia Stolbova / Fedor Klimov; Evgenia Tarasova / Vladimir Morozov	Ekaterina Bobrova / Dmitri Soloviev; Betina Popova / Sergey Mozgov; Alexandra Stepanova / Ivan Bukin
Turkey				Alisa Agafonova / Alper Uçar
United States	Nathan Chen; Grant Hochstein	Mariah Bell; Mirai Nagasu	Marissa Castelli / Mervin Tran	Rachel Parsons / Michael Parsons; Maia Shibutani / Alex Shibutani
Uzbekistan	Misha Ge			

=== Changes to preliminary assignments ===
Discipline	Withdrew		Added		Notes	Ref.
Discipline	Date	Skater(s)	Date	Skater(s)	Notes	Ref.
Ladies	September 13	(Hungary) Ivett Tóth	September 26	(Germany) Nicole Schott	Injury	
Men	—N/a		September 14	(Russia) Andrei Lazukin	Host picks	
Pairs	—N/a		September 14	(Russia) Kristina Astakhova / Alexei Rogonov	Host picks	
Ice dance	—N/a		September 14	(Russia) Sofia Evdokimova / Egor Bazin	Host picks	
Ladies	—N/a		September 20	(Russia) Valeria Mikhailova	Host picks	
Pairs	September 20	(China) Wang Xuehan / Wang Lei	September 22	(Austria) Miriam Ziegler / Severin Kiefer	Injury (Xuehan)	
Ice dance	October 9	(Russia) Sofia Evdokimova / Egor Bazin	October 9	(Russia) Betina Popova / Sergey Mozgov	Injury (Evdokimova)	
Ladies	October 9	(South Korea) Park So-youn	October 10	(Armenia) Anastasia Galustyan	Injury recovery	
Men	October 16	(Japan) Keiji Tanaka	October 16	(Georgia (country)) Moris Kvitelashvili	Injury	

== Results ==
=== Men ===
Rank	Name	Nation	Total points	SP		FS	
1	Nathan Chen	United States	293.79	1	100.54	2	193.25
2	Yuzuru Hanyu	Japan	290.77	2	94.85	1	195.92
3	Mikhail Kolyada	Russia	271.06	4	85.79	3	185.27
4	Misha Ge	Uzbekistan	255.33	5	85.02	4	170.31
5	Moris Kvitelashvili	Georgia	250.26	8	80.67	5	169.59
6	Dmitri Aliev	Russia	239.61	3	88.77	7	150.84
7	Nam Nguyen	Canada	238.45	7	80.74	6	157.71
8	Deniss Vasiļjevs	Latvia	227.53	6	82.44	9	145.09
9	Denis Ten	Kazakhstan	214.35	10	69.00	8	145.35
10	Andrei Lazukin	Russia	212.14	9	78.54	11	133.60
11	Grant Hochstein	United States	206.09	11	67.56	10	138.53
12	Daniel Samohin	Israel	183.79	12	62.02	12	121.77

=== Ladies ===
Rank	Name	Nation	Total points	SP		FS	
1	Evgenia Medvedeva	Russia	231.21	1	80.75	1	150.46
2	Carolina Kostner	Italy	215.98	2	74.62	2	141.36
3	Wakaba Higuchi	Japan	207.17	3	69.60	3	137.57
4	Elena Radionova	Russia	195.52	5	68.75	4	126.77
5	Kaori Sakamoto	Japan	194.00	4	68.88	5	125.12
6	Mariah Bell	United States	188.56	7	63.85	6	124.71
7	Valeria Mikhailova	Russia	185.09	8	63.38	8	121.71
8	Elizabet Tursynbayeva	Kazakhstan	184.95	6	63.92	9	121.03
9	Mirai Nagasu	United States	178.25	9	56.15	7	122.10
10	Nicole Schott	Germany	168.72	10	55.55	10	113.17
11	Maé-Bérénice Méité	France	160.96	11	54.24	12	106.72
12	Anastasia Galustyan	Armenia	154.90	12	48.10	11	106.80

=== Pairs ===
Rank	Name	Nation	Total points	SP		FS	
1	Evgenia Tarasova / Vladimir Morozov	Russia	224.25	1	76.88	1	147.37
2	Ksenia Stolbova / Fedor Klimov	Russia	204.43	2	71.39	2	133.04
3	Kristina Astakhova / Alexei Rogonov	Russia	199.11	4	67.14	3	131.97
4	Valentina Marchei / Ondřej Hotárek	Italy	193.63	3	68.48	4	125.15
5	Julianne Séguin / Charlie Bilodeau	Canada	186.16	5	67.06	5	119.10
6	Miriam Ziegler / Severin Kiefer	Austria	175.06	6	59.35	7	115.71
7	Marissa Castelli / Mervin Tran	United States	170.53	7	54.37	6	116.16
8	Sumire Suto / Francis Boudreau-Audet	Japan	136.80	8	48.93	8	87.87

=== Ice dance ===
Rank	Name	Nation	Total points	SD		FD	
1	Maia Shibutani / Alex Shibutani	United States	189.24	1	77.30	1	111.94
2	Ekaterina Bobrova / Dmitri Soloviev	Russia	184.74	2	76.33	2	108.41
3	Alexandra Stepanova / Ivan Bukin	Russia	179.35	3	71.32	3	108.03
4	Piper Gilles / Paul Poirier	Canada	172.29	4	69.67	4	102.62
5	Charlène Guignard / Marco Fabbri	Italy	171.37	5	68.99	5	102.38
6	Betina Popova / Sergey Mozgov	Russia	164.02	6	64.14	6	99.88
7	Rachel Parsons / Michael Parsons	United States	148.75	7	59.41	8	89.34
8	Marie-Jade Lauriault / Romain Le Gac	France	147.19	8	55.64	7	91.55
9	Alisa Agafonova / Alper Uçar	Turkey	140.79	10	53.11	9	87.68
10	Nicole Kuzmichová / Alexandr Sinicyn	Czech Republic	136.81	9	54.39	10	82.42
