= Liam Firus =

Canadian figure skater (born 1992)

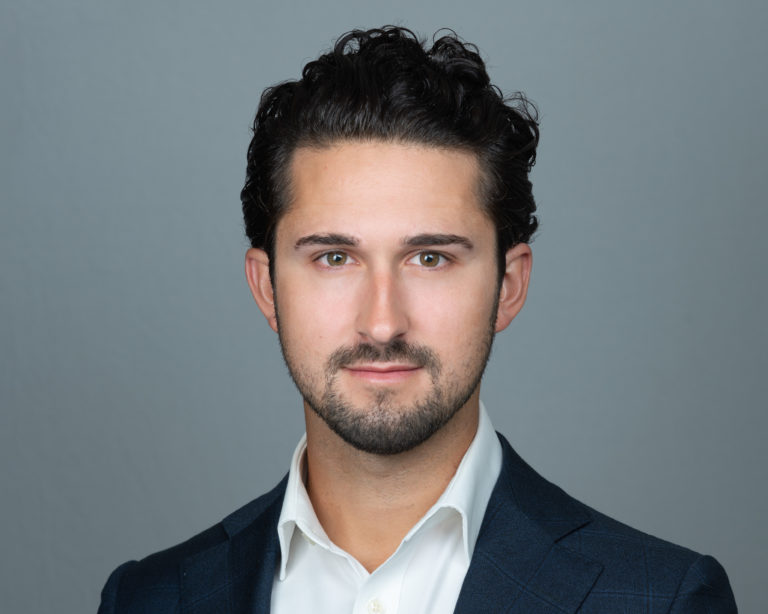

Personal information
- Born: July 2, 1992 (age 34) North Vancouver, British Columbia
- Height: 1.70 m (5 ft 7 in)

Figure skating career
- Country: Canada
- Coach: Bruno Marcotte
- Skating club: Vancouver Skating Club
- Began skating: 2000
- Retired: May 14, 2018

Liam Firus (born July 2, 1992) is a Canadian businessman and partner at Rockbank Capital Corp. A retired competitive figure skater, he represented Canada at the 2014 Winter Olympic Games in Sochi.

== Personal life ==
Liam Firus was born July 2, 1992, in North Vancouver, British Columbia. He is the son of Lois Sullivan, a real estate agent, and Trevor Firus, an accountant. He has a younger brother, Shane, who competes in ice dancing.

Firus attended Sentinel Secondary School in West Vancouver. After part-time business administration studies at Capilano University, Firus became a student at Athabasca University, pursuing a Bachelor of Commerce degree with a major in finance. In 2013, he passed the Canadian Securities Course.

Firus began dating Canadian pairs figure skater Kirsten Moore-Towers in 2015. On August 22, 2023, they became engaged.

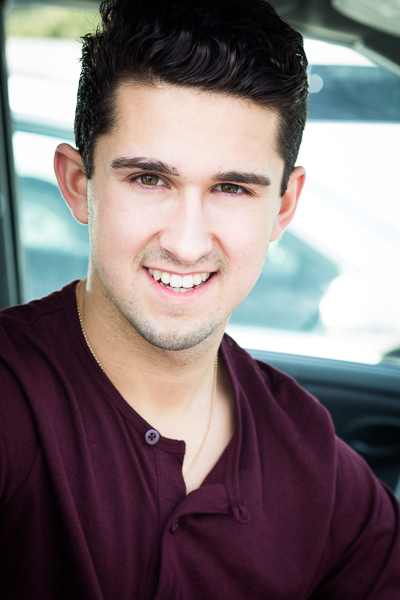
Liam Firus 2014

== Career ==
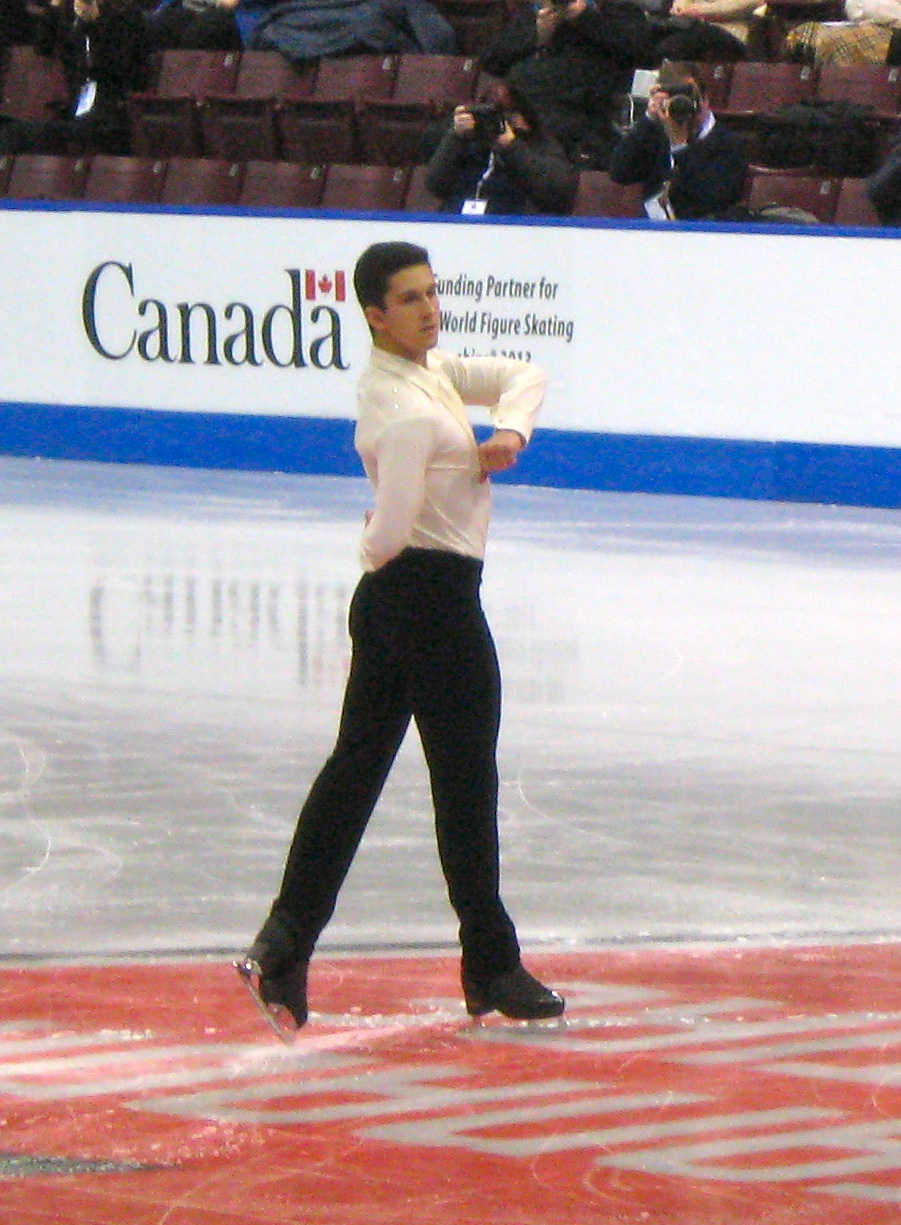
Firus competing at the 2013 Canadian Championships

=== Early years ===
Firus started skating as a hockey player in 1999 and eventually switched to figure skating. Lorna Bauer began teaching him when he was eight years old. A member of the North Shore's Vancouver Skating Club, he trained in the fall and winter at the Pacific National Exhibition Agrodome and the rest of the year at the Canlan Ice Sports Arena.

During the 2009–2010 season, Firus won the Canadian junior title but was not assigned to the World Junior Championships.

=== 2010–2011 season ===
Firus finished 6th in his senior national debut at the 2011 Canadian Championships and was assigned to the World Junior Championships where he finished 20th.

=== 2011–2012 season ===
Firus began the 2011–2012 season by winning the bronze medal at the Junior Grand Prix event in Brisbane, Australia.

=== 2012–2013 season ===
Firus experienced severe pelvic pain while training for the Canadian Championships. He placed fifth at the event in January 2013. His condition developed into osteitis pubis and he decided to undergo prolotherapy. He resumed training after five months.

=== 2013–2014 season ===
In autumn 2013, Firus began training under Christy Krall in Colorado Springs, Colorado. He won bronze at the 2014 Canadian Championships and was named to the Canadian team at the 2014 Winter Olympics. He finished 28th in Sochi.

=== 2014–2015 season ===
Firus placed 11th at the 2014 Skate Canada International in Kelowna, British Columbia and won the bronze medal at the 2015 Canadian Championships in Kingston, Ontario. He finished 15th at the 2015 Four Continents Championships.

=== 2015–2016 season ===
Firus won silver at the 2016 Canadian Nationals and finished 13th at the 2016 Four Continents Championships. He withdrew from the 2016 World Championships in Boston, stating "Making this decision was extremely difficult. However, I feel that withdrawing from the World Championships is vital for our team."

=== 2016–2017 season ===
Ahead of the season, Firus changed coaches, joining Bruno Marcotte in Montreal, Quebec.

=== 2017–2018 season ===
Firus won the bronze medal at the 2017 CS Warsaw Cup in Poland. A few days later, he was invited to a Grand Prix event, 2017 Skate America, receiving the call on the Wednesday morning before the event. He officially announced his retirement on May 14, 2018.

== Programs ==
Season	Short program	Free skating	Exhibition
2017–2018	Happy Ending by Mika	La La Land (soundtrack) by Justin Hurwitz	
2016–2017	Happy Ending by Mika	Love, Reign o'er Me by The Who	
2015–2016	Blues for Klook by Eddy Louiss choreo. by Mark Pillay	Moulin Rouge! by Craig Armstrong choreo. by Mark Pillay	
2014–2015	Fascination by Fermo Dante Marchetti performed by Richard Hayman choreo. by Mark Pillay	Moulin Rouge! by Craig Armstrong choreo. by Mark Pillay	
2013–2014	Fascination by Fermo Dante Marchetti performed by Richard Hayman choreo. by Mark Pillay	The Bolt by Dmitri Shostakovich choreo. by Mark Pillay	
2012–2013	Violin Concerto in D by Pyotr Tchaikovsky	The Resistance by Muse	
2011–2012	You Can't Always Get What You Want by The Rolling Stones	Lawrence of Arabia by Maurice Jarre	
2010–2011		Lawrence of Arabia by Maurice Jarre	
2009–2010	Allegretto (from Paladio for String Orchestra) by Karl Jenkins, Carmine Laun, David Alberman	Black Hawk Dawn by Hans Zimmer; The 13th Warrior by Jerry Goldsmith	

== Competitive highlights ==
GP: Grand Prix; CS: Challenger Series; JGP: Junior Grand Prix

International
Event	07–08	08–09	09–10	10–11	11–12	12–13	13–14	14–15	15–16	16–17	17–18
Olympics							28th				
Worlds									WD		
Four Continents								15th	13th		
GP Skate America											8th
GP Skate Canada						10th		11th		9th	
CS Finlandia									7th		
CS Golden Spin									8th		
CS Nebelhorn								9th		5th	
CS U.S. Classic											3rd
CS Warsaw Cup											3rd
Triglav Trophy									1st		
U.S. Classic						8th					
International: Junior or novice
Junior Worlds				20th	8th						
JGP Australia					3rd						
JGP Austria					11th						
JGP Belarus			8th								
JGP Romania				5th							
JGP Turkey			7th								
JGP U.K.				3rd							
Merano Cup	1st N										
National
Canadian Champ.		10th J	1st J	6th	6th	5th	3rd	3rd	2nd	7th	8th
TBD = Assigned; WD = Withdrew; Levels: N = Novice; J = Junior
