= Andrei Lazukin =

Russian figure skater

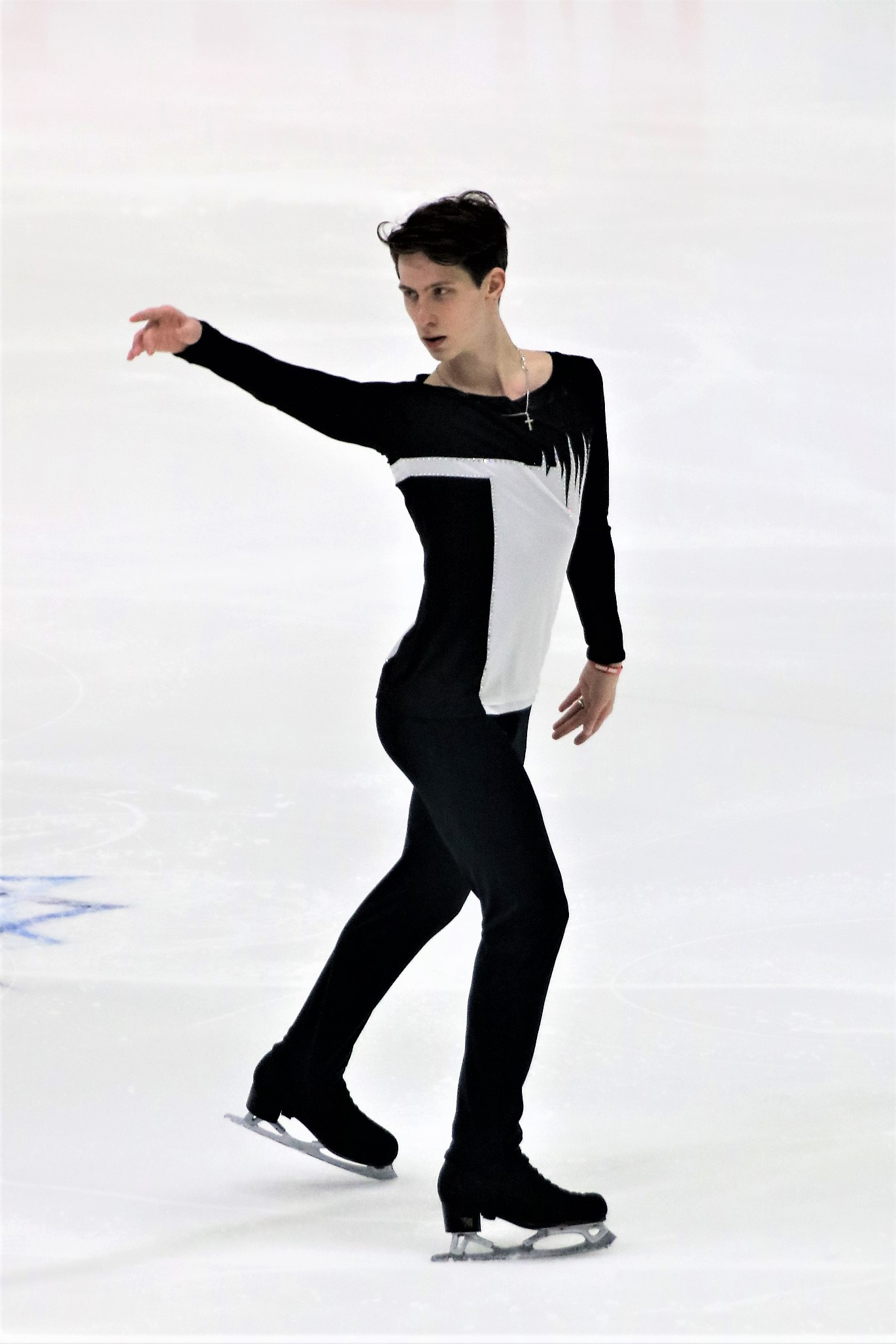

Personal information
- Native name: Андрей Олегович Лазукин
- Full name: Andrei Olegovich Lazukin
- Born: 19 November 1997 (age 28) Tolyatti, Russia
- Height: 1.79 m (5 ft 10 1/2 in)

Figure skating career
- Country: Russia
- Coach: Alexei Mishin
- Skating club: Olympic School Zvezdnyi Led St. Petersburg; Olympic School Samara Region
- Began skating: 2001
- Retired: September 25, 2023
Medal record
Representing Russia
Figure skating: Men's singles
World Team Trophy
Bronze medal – third place	2019 Fukuoka	Team

Andrei Olegovich Lazukin (Russian: Андрей Олегович Лазукин, born 19 November 1997) is a Russian retired figure skater. He is the 2015 Bavarian Open champion, 2017 Triglav Trophy silver medalist, and 2018 CS Lombardia Trophy bronze medalist. Earlier in his career, he won gold at the 2014 ISU Junior Grand Prix in Germany.

== Personal life ==
Andrei Olegovich Lazukin was born on 19 November 1997 in Tolyatti, Russia. He dated fellow figure skater Elizaveta Tuktamysheva.

== Career ==
=== Early career ===
Lazukin began learning to skate in 2001. Making his ISU Junior Grand Prix (JGP) debut, he placed seventh in Linz, Austria, in September 2012. During the 2013 JGP series, he was sent to Mexico City, where he finished fifth.

In early October 2014, Lazukin won gold at the 2014 JGP event in Dresden, Germany. In November, he placed fifth at the 2014 CS Volvo Open Cup, an ISU Challenger Series event and his first senior international. He won gold at the Bavarian Open in February 2015.

Lazukin missed part of the 2015–2016 season due to a back injury. He finished fourth at the 2017 Russian Championships in Chelyabinsk and took the silver medal at the Triglav Trophy in April 2017.

=== 2017–2018 season ===
Lazukin started his season by competing in two ISU Challenger Series events. In mid-September he placed eighth at the 2017 CS Lombardia Trophy and in early October he finished eighth again in 2017 CS Finlandia Trophy. Two weeks later he made his Grand Prix debut at the 2017 Rostelecom Cup where he placed tenth. In December he skated his third Challenger event of the season at the 2017 CS Golden Spin of Zagreb where he placed sixth. In late December he finished seventh at the 2018 Russian Championships.

=== 2018–2019 season ===
In September Lazukin won the bronze medal at the 2018 CS Lombardia Trophy with a personal best score of 243.45 points. This medal was his first ISU Challenger Series medal. In early November he placed sixth at the 2018 Grand Prix of Helsinki. Two weeks later he finished seventh at the 2018 Rostelecom Cup. At the 2019 Russian Championships, he debuted a new free skate to Pyotr Ilyich Tchaikovsky's Romeo and Juliet, finishing in fourth place overall.

In February 2019, he took silver at the 2019 Dragon Trophy in Ljubljana, Slovenia. At the 2019 Russian Cup Final he won gold, placing first in the short program and six in the free. In March 2019 Lazukin competed at the 2019 Winter Universiade placed third in the short program, fifth in the free program, and fifth overall.

Lazukin was assigned to the 2019 World Championships in Saitama, Japan, following the withdrawal of Maxim Kovtun. Lazukin placed tenth, setting a new personal best in the free skating and total score. He concluded the season at the 2019 World Team Trophy as part of the bronze medal-winning Team Russia.

=== 2019–2020 season ===
Beginning the season on the Challenger series, Lazukin placed twelfth at Lombardia and seventh at the Finlandia Trophy.

At his first Grand Prix assignment, Lazukin was sixth in the short program after a rough landing on his quad Lutz attempt and having to put a hand down on his triple Axel. He placed last in the free skate after numerous errors, dropping to eighth place overall. Lazukin was tenth at the 2019 Cup of China. He then placed twelfth at the 2020 Russian Championships, where he was reported to be dealing with a knee injury.

== Programs ==
Season	Short program	Free skating	Exhibition
2019–2020	Mack the Knife (from The Threepenny Opera) by Kurt Weill performed by Bobby Darin choreo. by Tatiana Prokofieva	Concierto de Aranjuez by Joaquín Rodrigo choreo. by Tatiana Prokofieva	
2018–2019	I Put a Spell on You by Joe Cocker choreo. by Tatiana Prokofieva	Romeo and Juliet by Pyotr Ilyich Tchaikovsky choreo. by Tatiana Prokofieva; Prelude in C-sharp minor Op. 3, No. 2 by Sergei Rachmaninoff choreo. by Tatiana Prokofieva	
2017–2018	Malagueña (from Once Upon a Time in Mexico) by Ernesto Lecuona, Brian Setzer choreo. by Tatiana Prokofieva	Masquerade by Aram Khachaturian choreo. by Tatiana Prokofieva	
2016–2017 2015–2016	Nessun dorma (from Turandot) by Giacomo Puccini performed by Andrea Bocelli choreo. by Tatiana Prokofieva	Don Quixote by Ludwig Minkus choreo. by Tatiana Prokofieva	
2014–2015	Piano Concerto No. 1 by Felix Mendelssohn choreo. by Tatiana Prokofieva	Exogenesis: Symphony Part III, Redemption by Muse choreo. by Tatiana Prokofieva	
2013–2014	Music by Antonín Dvořák choreo. by Tatiana Prokofieva	Dark Eyes by Florian Hermann choreo. by Tatiana Prokofieva	

== Competitive highlights ==
GP: Grand Prix; CS: Challenger Series; JGP: Junior Grand Prix

International
Event	11–12	12–13	13–14	14–15	15–16	16–17	17–18	18–19	19–20	21–22
Worlds								10th		
GP Cup of China									10th	
GP Finland								6th		
GP Rostelecom Cup							10th	7th		
GP Skate Canada									8th	
CS Finlandia							8th		7th	
CS Golden Spin							6th	WD		
CS Lombardia							8th	3rd	12th	
CS Volvo Cup				5th						
Bavarian Open				1st						
Cup of Nice					11th					
Dragon Trophy								2nd		
Triglav Trophy						2nd				
Universiade						9th		5th		
International: Junior
JGP Austria		7th								
JGP Croatia				8th						
JGP Germany				1st						
JGP Mexico			5th							
JGP Spain					9th					
Cup of Nice				1st J						
National
Russia		13th	14th	13th	13th	4th	7th	4th	12th	
Russia, Junior	13th	8th	8th	6th	10th					
Russian Cup Final	7th J	5th J	3rd	3rd		5th		1st		WD
Team events
World Team; Trophy								3rd T 8th P		
J = Junior level; WD = Withdrew; T = Team result; P = Personal result. Medals awarded for team result only.

== Detailed results ==
Small medals for short and free programs awarded only at ISU Championships. At team events, medals awarded for team results only.

=== Senior level ===
2019–20 season
Date	Event	SP	FS	Total
24–29 December 2019	2020 Russian Championships	5; 85.56	15; 137.53	12; 223.09
8–10 November 2019	2019 Cup of China	8; 74.31	10; 135.70	10; 210.01
25–27 October 2019	2019 Skate Canada	6; 78.99	12; 133.08	8; 212.07
11–13 October 2019	2019 CS Finlandia Trophy	5; 75.59	8; 128.32	7; 203.91
13–15 September 2019	2019 CS Lombardia Trophy	10; 63.23	13; 105.31	12; 168.54
2018–2019 season
Date	Event	SP	FS	Total
11–14 April 2019	2019 World Team Trophy	5; 88.96	8; 160.37	3T/8P; 249.33
18–24 March 2019	2019 World Championships	11; 84.05	9; 164.69	10; 248.74
7–9 March 2019	2019 Winter Universiade	3; 88.63	5; 157.10	5; 245.73
18–22 February 2019	2019 Russian Cup Final domestic competition	1; 91.57	6; 150.60	1; 242.17
7–10 February 2019	2019 Dragon Trophy	1; 91.34	4; 123.03	2; 214.37
19–23 December 2018	2019 Russian Championships	5; 81.43	6; 156.23	4; 237.66
16–18 November 2018	2018 Rostelecom Cup	11; 62.45	5; 153.33	7; 215.78
2–4 November 2018	2018 Grand Prix of Helsinki	5; 82.54	7; 135.68	6; 218.22
12–16 September 2018	2018 CS Lombardia Trophy	2; 87.92	3; 155.53	3; 243.45
2017–2018 season
Date	Event	SP	FS	Total
21–24 December 2017	2018 Russian Championships	5; 85.47	9; 145.47	7; 230.94
6–9 December 2017	2017 CS Golden Spin of Zagreb	9; 69.56	2; 155.19	6; 224.75
20–22 October 2017	2017 Rostelecom Cup	9; 78.54	11; 133.60	10; 212.14
6–8 October 2017	2017 CS Finlandia Trophy	8; 68.50	7; 142.16	8; 210.66
14–17 September 2017	2017 CS Lombardia Trophy	9; 67.92	8; 131.50	8; 199.42
2016–2017 season
Date	Event	SP	FS	Total
5–9 April 2017	2017 Triglav Trophy	1; 77.33	2; 137.44	2; 214.77
1–5 February 2017	2017 Winter Universiade	4; 84.74	12; 135.26	9; 220.00
20–26 December 2016	2017 Russian Championships	4; 83.19	6; 157.81	4; 241.00

=== Junior Level ===
2015–2016 season
Date	Event	Level	SP	FS	Total
19–23 January 2016	2016 Russian Junior Championships	Junior	5; 69.56	13; 116.45	10; 186.01
24–27 December 2015	2016 Russian Championships	Senior	11; 74.06	13; 126.94	13; 201.00
2014–2015 season
Date	Event	Level	SP	FS	Total
11–15 February 2015	2015 Bavarian Open	Senior	1; 74.26	1; 121.93	1; 196.19
4–7 February 2015	2015 Russian Junior Championships	Junior	3; 69.74	7; 122.51	6; 192.25
24–28 December 2014	2015 Russian Championships	Senior	10; 70.92	17; 110.74	13; 181.66
5–9 November 2014	2014 CS Volvo Open Cup	Senior	4; 61.66	5; 112.75	5; 174.41
8–12 October 2014	2014 JGP Croatia	Junior	9; 56.44	8; 113.52	8; 169.96
1–5 October 2014	2014 JGP Germany	Junior	1; 68.73	1; 133.95	1; 202.68
2013–2014 season
Date	Event	Level	SP	FS	Total
22–25 January 2014	2014 Russian Junior Championships	Junior	4; 70.15	11; 113.87	8; 184.02
24–27 December 2013	2014 Russian Championships	Senior	18; 58.42	13; 127.83	14; 186.25
2012–2013 season
Date	Event	Level	SP	FS	Total
1–3 February 2013	2013 Russian Junior Championships	Junior	9; 66.40	8; 132.84	8; 199.24
24–28 December 2012	2013 Russian Championships	Senior	16; 60.51	13; 124.13	13; 184.54
2011–2012 season
Date	Event	Level	SP	FS	Total
5–7 February 2012	2012 Russian Junior Championships	Junior	12; 55.54	15; 98.01	13; 153.55
