= Valeria Mikhailova =

Russian figure skater (born 2002)

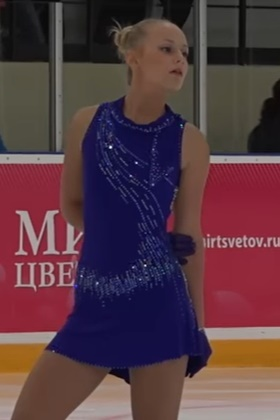
- Mikhailova at the 2017 Russian Cup Final

Personal information
- Native name: Валерия Сергеевна Михайлова
- Full name: Valeria Sergeevna Mikhailova
- Born: 14 February 2002 (age 24) Moscow, Russia
- Height: 1.68 m (5 ft 6 in)

Figure skating career
- Country: Russia
- Coach: Alexei Vasilevsky, Yulia Lavrenchuk, Anna Tsareva
- Skating club: Sambo 70

Valeria Sergeevna Mikhailova (Russian: Валерия Сергеевна Михайлова, born 14 February 2002) is a Russian figure skater.

== Career ==
Mikhailova finished 13th at the 2014 Russian Junior Championships and 9th at the 2015 Russian Junior Championships.

Mikhailova made her international debut on the 2015–16 ISU Junior Grand Prix (JGP) series. After placing 5th in Slovakia, she finished 4th at her next JGP assignment, in the United States.

In September 2017, Mikhailova was assigned to a senior Grand Prix event, the 2017 Rostelecom Cup, where she placed 7th with a personal best score of 185.09 points.

== Programs ==
Season	Short program	Free skating
2016–2018	Run Run Run by Aaron Pearce, Harold Lilly, Elvis Williams, Demario Bridges performed by Jill Scott	Head Over Heels; Thank You for the Music; Money, Money, Money by ABBA
2015–2016	Primavera by Ludovico Einaudi choreo. by Viktoria Bondarenko	Ice Queen by Paul Dinletir choreo. by Viktoria Bondarenko
2014–2015	Music and the Spoken Word	Chandelier by Sia
2013–2014	Hüzün by Bünyamin Olguncan, İskender Şencemal	Poeta by Vicente Amigo
2012–2013	Sing, Sing, Sing by Louis Prima	The Promise by Secret Garden

== Competitive highlights ==
GP: Grand Prix; JGP: Junior Grand Prix

International
Event	13–14	14–15	15–16	16–17	17–18	18–19
GP Rostelecom Cup					7th	
International: Junior
JGP Slovakia			5th			
JGP U.S.			4th			
National
Russian Champ.	13th J	9th J	13th J	11th	14th	
TBD = Assigned

== Detailed results ==
2017–18 season
Date	Event	Level	SP	FS	Total
21–24 December 2017	2018 Russian Championships	Senior	14; 63.79	13; 122.72	14; 186.51
20–22 October 2017	2017 Rostelecom Cup	Senior	8; 63.38	8; 121.71	7; 185.09
2016–17 season
Date	Event	Level	SP	FS	Total
20–26 December 2016	2017 Russian Championships	Senior	12; 59.90	11; 120.83	11; 180.73
2015–16 season
Date	Event	Level	SP	FS	Total
21–23 January 2016	2016 Russian Junior Championships	Junior	11; 53.60	13; 101.86	13; 155.46
2–6 September 2015	2015 JGP USA	Junior	7; 50.63	2; 101.59	4; 152.22
19–23 August 2015	2015 JGP Slovakia	Junior	4; 53.44	6; 87.88	5; 141.32
2014–15 season
Date	Event	Level	SP	FS	Total
4–7 February 2015	2015 Russian Junior Championships	Junior	13; 53.22	9; 101.56	9; 154.78
2013–14 season
Date	Event	Level	SP	FS	Total
22–25 January 2014	2014 Russian Junior Championships	Junior	12; 53.50	13; 94.05	13; 147.55
