= Nicole Rajičová =

Slovak-American figure skater

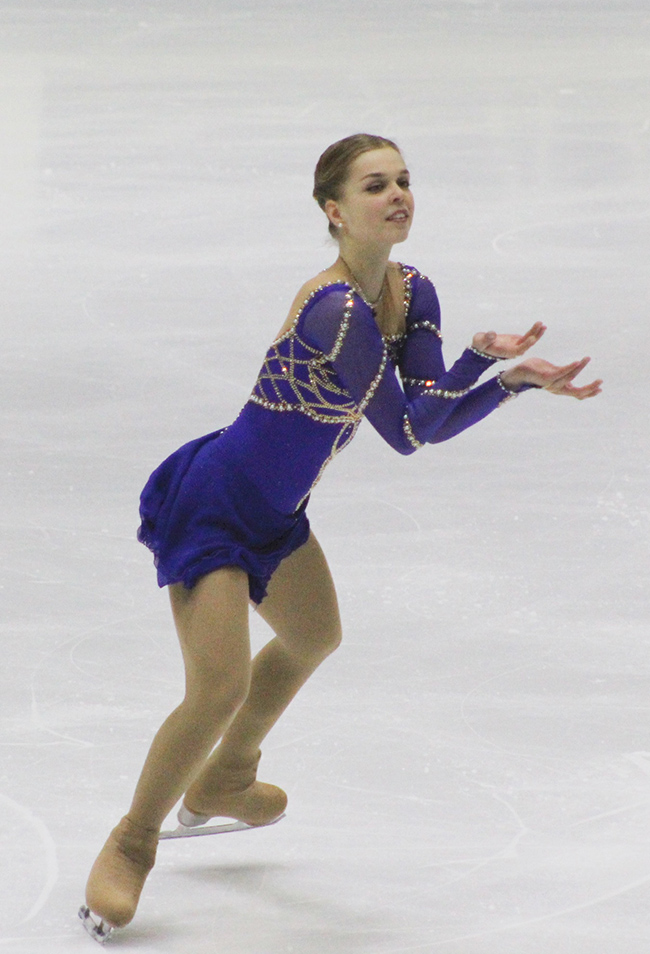
- Rajičová in 2015

Personal information
- Other names: Nicole Rajic
- Born: August 13, 1995 (age 31) Garden City, New York, U.S.
- Height: 5 ft 4 in (1.63 m)

Figure skating career
- Country: Slovakia
- Discipline: Women's singles
- Coach: Igor Krokavec, Nikolai Morozov, Tom Rajic
- Skating club: SKP Bratislava
- Began skating: 1998

Medal record
Representing Slovakia
Slovak Championships
Gold medal – first place	2013 Cieszyn	Singles
Gold medal – first place	2015 Budapest	Singles
Gold medal – first place	2016 Třinec	Singles
Gold medal – first place	2017 Katowice	Singles
Gold medal – first place	2019 Budapest	Singles
Gold medal – first place	2021 Cieszyn	Singles
Silver medal – second place	2012 Ostrava	Singles

Nicole Rajičová or Rajic (born August 13, 1995) is a Slovak-American figure skater who represents Slovakia in ladies' singles. She is the 2014 CS Golden Spin of Zagreb bronze medalist, the 2013 Merano Cup silver medalist, the 2013 Bavarian Open bronze medalist, the 2013 Ice Challenge bronze medalist, and a five-time Slovak national champion (2013, 2015–2017, 2019).

She placed 24th at the 2014 Winter Olympics and 14th at the 2018 Winter Olympics.

== Personal life ==
Nicole Rajičová was born August 13, 1995, in Garden City, New York. She is also known as Nicole Rajic; Rajičová is the Slovak feminine form. Her parents, Anna and Tomislav Rajič (Tom Rajic), moved to the United States from Slovakia. She received her undergraduate degree from Fordham University's Gabelli School of Business.

== Career ==
=== Early years ===
By the age of five, Rajičová began taking figure skating lessons in Long Island from Milada Kubikova-Stastny (Šťastná-Kubíková), a former Olympian for Czechoslovakia. Early in her career, she competed as Nicole Rajic in U.S. regional and domestic events.

=== 2011–12 to 2012–13 ===
Rajičová debuted internationally for Slovakia in December 2011 at the Golden Spin of Zagreb. She began appearing in ISU Junior Grand Prix (JGP) events in autumn 2012 and became the Slovak national champion at the 2013 Three Nationals Championships.

=== 2013–14 season: Sochi Olympics ===
Rajičová competed at two JGP events in September 2013, placing eighth in Košice, Slovakia and fifteenth in Gdańsk, Poland. Her first senior ISU Championship was the European Championships in January 2014 in Budapest, Hungary. Ranked fourteenth in the short program, she advanced to the free skate and finished seventeenth. In March, she competed at the 2014 Winter Olympics in Sochi, Russia; she qualified for the free skate by placing twenty-first in the short program and finished twenty-fourth overall.

Rajičová just missed qualifying for the free skate at the 2014 World Championships in Saitama, Japan after placing twenty-fifth in the short program.

=== 2014–15 season ===
During the 2014–15 JGP season, Rajičová placed fourth in Ljubljana, Slovenia in August and fourth in Zagreb, Croatia in October. In November, she competed for the first time on the ISU Challenger Series (CS), finishing sixth at the 2014 CS Ice Challenge. In December, she won the bronze medal at the 2014 CS Golden Spin of Zagreb.

In January, Rajičová finished eleventh at the 2015 European Championships in Stockholm, Sweden, having ranked eighth in the short program and twelfth in the free skate. In early March, she competed at the 2015 World Junior Championships in Tallinn, Estonia; she placed fifth in the short, thirteenth in the free, and eleventh overall. Later that month, she finished fifteenth in Shanghai, China at the 2015 World Championships after placing fourteenth in the short and fifteenth in the free.

=== 2015–16 season: Grand Prix debut ===
Rajičová placed ninth at the 2015 CS Ondrej Nepela Trophy. Making her Grand Prix (GP) debut, she placed seventh at the 2015 Skate America and 2015 Cup of China. At the 2016 Europeans in Bratislava she placed twelfth, and at the 2016 Worlds in Boston she placed thirteenth.

=== 2016–17 season ===
Ranked seventh in the short, sixth in the free, and sixth overall, Rajičová achieved her career-best continental result at the 2017 European Championships in Ostrava, Czech Republic.

=== 2017–18 season: Pyeongchang Olympics ===
Rajičová was given two Grand Prix assignments for the season, the 2017 NHK Trophy, where she placed tenth, and the 2017 Skate America, where she placed ninth. At the 2018 European Championships in Moscow, she placed ninth in the short program and sixth in the free skate, finishing in sixth place.

At the 2018 Winter Olympics in Pyeongchang, South Korea, Rajičová again represented Slovakia. She finished thirteenth in the short program and fifteenth in the free skate, ranking fourteenth overall. She concluded the season at the 2018 World Championships in Milan, where she placed twenty-seventh and for the first time in four years did not qualify for the free skate.

=== 2018–19 season ===
Rajičová was assigned to two Grand Prix events, the 2018 Skate America and the 2018 Grand Prix of Helsinki, but withdrew from both of them, as well as the 2018 CS Ondrej Nepela Trophy. Her participation in the remainder of the season was in doubt for some time afterward. She returned to training in October following an eight-month hiatus, and won another Slovak national title.

Competing internationally for the first time at the 2019 European Championships, she placed fifth in the short program, and expressed happiness with the result, saying "two weeks ago, I didn’t know if I was going to compete because I wasn’t in the shape I wished I was in." She placed twelfth in the free program, dropping to ninth overall, and said that the skate "started off quite well and then my legs collapsed. It was quite a fight. I got so tired I couldn’t even handle double Axels. It is what it is. I just have to go and do more run-throughs."

=== 2020–21 season ===
Rajičová placed fifth at the 2021 Four National Championships, taking the Slovak national title.

=== 2021–22 season ===
Rajičová attempted to qualify a berth for Slovakia at the 2022 Winter Olympics by competing at the 2021 CS Nebelhorn Trophy, but placed eighteenth, outside of qualification.

== Programs ==
Season	Short program	Free skating
2020–2021	Une page d'amour by Nathalia Mansner	Rain, In Your Black Eyes by Ezio Bosso
2020–2021	Liebesträume No. 3 by Franz Liszt	La Terre Vue Du Ciel by Armand Amar
2018–2019	Love Story by Francis Lai	Doctor Zhivago by Maurice Jarre
2017–2018	Une page d'amour by Nathalia Mansner	Rain In Your Black Eyes by Ezio Bosso
2016–2017	Love Story by Francis Lai	Rain In Your Black Eyes by Ezio Bosso
2015–2016	Romeo and Juliet: Love Theme by Nino Rota; Feeling Good performed by Jennifer Hudson	Doctor Zhivago by Maurice Jarre
2014–2015	Romeo and Juliet: Love Theme by Nino Rota	Anna Karenina by Dario Marianelli
2013–2014	Papa, Can You Hear Me? (from Yentl) by Michel Legrand	Tango Amore by Edvin Marton
2012–2013	Malagueña by Ernesto Lecuona	Liebestraum by Franz Liszt
2010–2011	Malagueña by Ernesto Lecuona	La bohème by Giacomo Puccini

== Results ==
GP: Grand Prix; CS: Challenger Series; JGP: Junior Grand Prix

=== For Slovakia ===
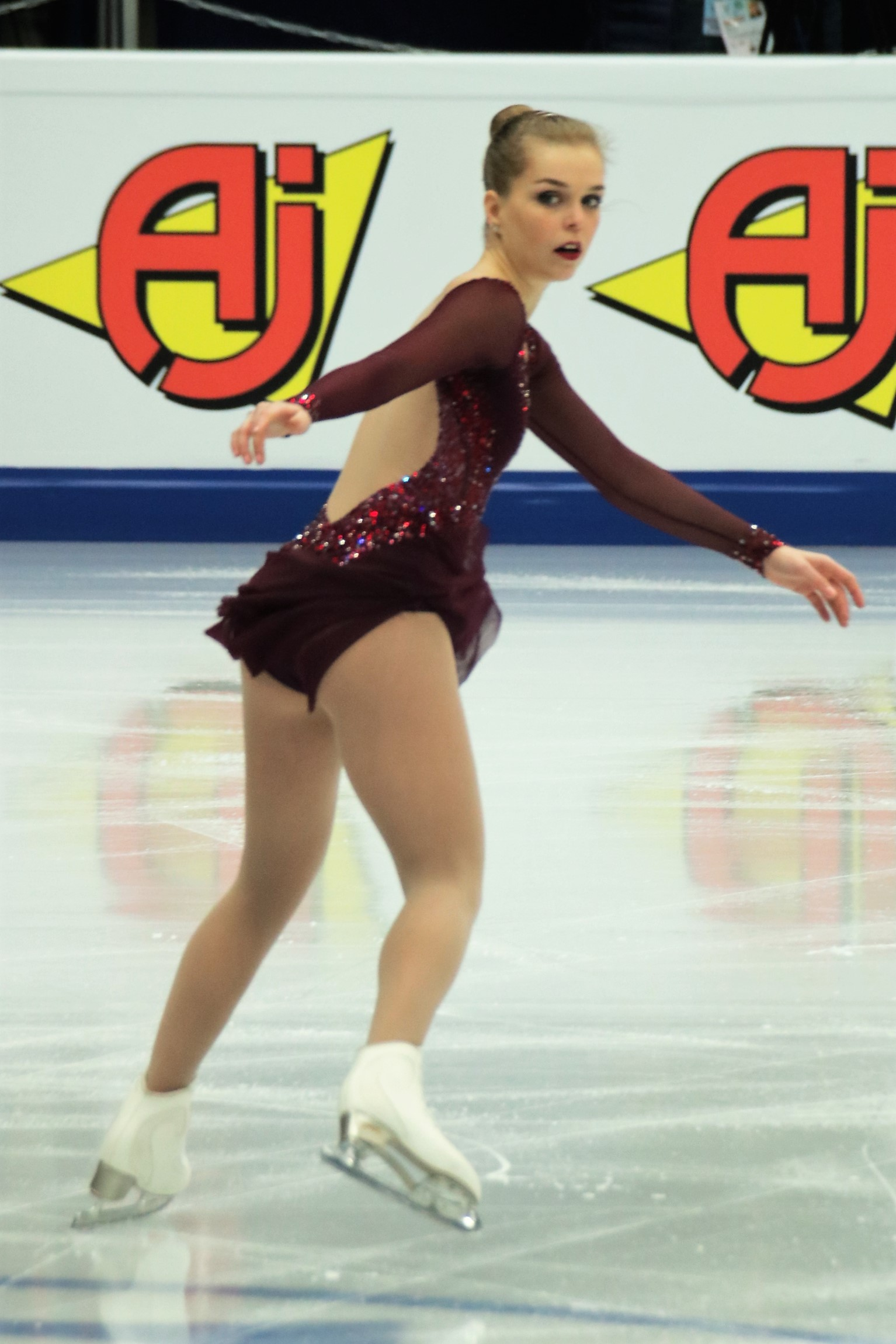
Rajičová at the 2018 European Championships

International
Event	11–12	12–13	13–14	14–15	15–16	16–17	17–18	18–19	19–20	20–21	21–22
Olympics			24th				14th				
Worlds			25th	15th	13th	17th	27th	32nd			
Europeans			17th	11th	12th	6th	6th	9th			
GP Skate America					7th		9th	WD			
GP Cup of China					7th						
GP Finland								WD			
GP Rostelecom						7th					
GP NHK Trophy						11th	10th				
CS Cup of Tyrol										C	
CS Golden Spin				3rd							
CS Ice Challenge				6th							
CS Lombardia						WD					
CS Nebelhorn											18th
CS Ondrej Nepela					9th	5th	7th	WD	WD		
CS Warsaw Cup					5th						
Bavarian Open		3rd									
Cup of Tyrol								4th			
Golden Spin	12th										
Ice Challenge		7th	3rd								
Merano Cup		2nd									
New Year's Cup		7th									
NRW Trophy			3rd								
Ondrej Nepela		19th	6th								
International: Junior
Junior Worlds		30th		11th							
JGP Croatia				4th							
JGP Poland			15th								
JGP Slovakia			8th								
JGP Slovenia		15th		4th							
JGP U.S.		13th									
National
Slovak Champ.	2nd	1st	4th	1st	1st	1st		1st		1st	
Four Nationals	2nd	2nd	11th	1st	1st	2nd		5th		5th	
TBD = Assigned; WD = Withdrew; C = Event Cancelled

=== For the United States ===
National
Event	10–11
U.S. Championships	12th J
