= Jean-François Ballester =

French figure skating coach (1965–2018)

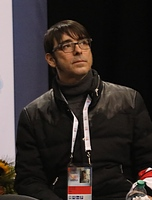
- Jean-François Ballester at the 2017 Skate America

Personal information
- Other names: Jeff Ballester
- Born: 1 September 1965 Rouen, France
- Died: 2 December 2018 (aged 53) La Chaux-de-Fonds, Switzerland

Figure skating career
- Country: France
- Skating club: CP La Chaux-de-Fonds; CP Biel-Bienne; ACSEL Caen
- Began skating: c. 1970

Jean-François Ballester (1 September 1965 – 2 December 2018) was a French figure skating coach. He is best known for his work with Aliona Savchenko / Bruno Massot, who won gold at the 2018 Winter Olympics, 2018 World Championships and 2017–18 Grand Prix Final.

== Personal life ==
Jean-François "Jeff" Ballester was born on 1 September 1965, in Rouen, France. He died on 2 December 2018 in La Chaux-de-Fonds, Switzerland, following a heart attack at his home.

His mother and sister have also worked as skating coaches.

== Career ==
Ballester started learning to skate as a five-year-old and was competing in junior pairs when he decided to retire at age 19. He coached at ACSEL Caen (France) from 1994 to 2014. He also worked in Switzerland, at CP La Chaux-de-Fonds and CP Biel/Bienne.

Ballester coached:

- Bruno Massot, since Massot was seven years old.
- Camille Foucher / Bruno Massot, from 2007 to 2009.
- Daria Popova / Bruno Massot, from 2011 to 2014.
- Aliona Savchenko / Bruno Massot (2018 Olympic, World, and Grand Prix Final champions), from 2014.
- Alexandra Herbríková / Nicolas Roulet, from 2013 to 2017.
- Ioulia Chtchetinina / Noah Scherer, from 2015 to 2017.
- Ioulia Chtchetinina / Mikhail Akulov, from 2017.
- Kevin Aymoz, until 2016.
- Nicola Todeschini, from 2017.
- Valtter Virtanen, from 2018.
- Laurine Lecavelier, from 2018.
- Miriam Ziegler / Severin Kiefer, from the summer of 2018.
