= 2013 French Figure Skating Championships =

Figure skating competition

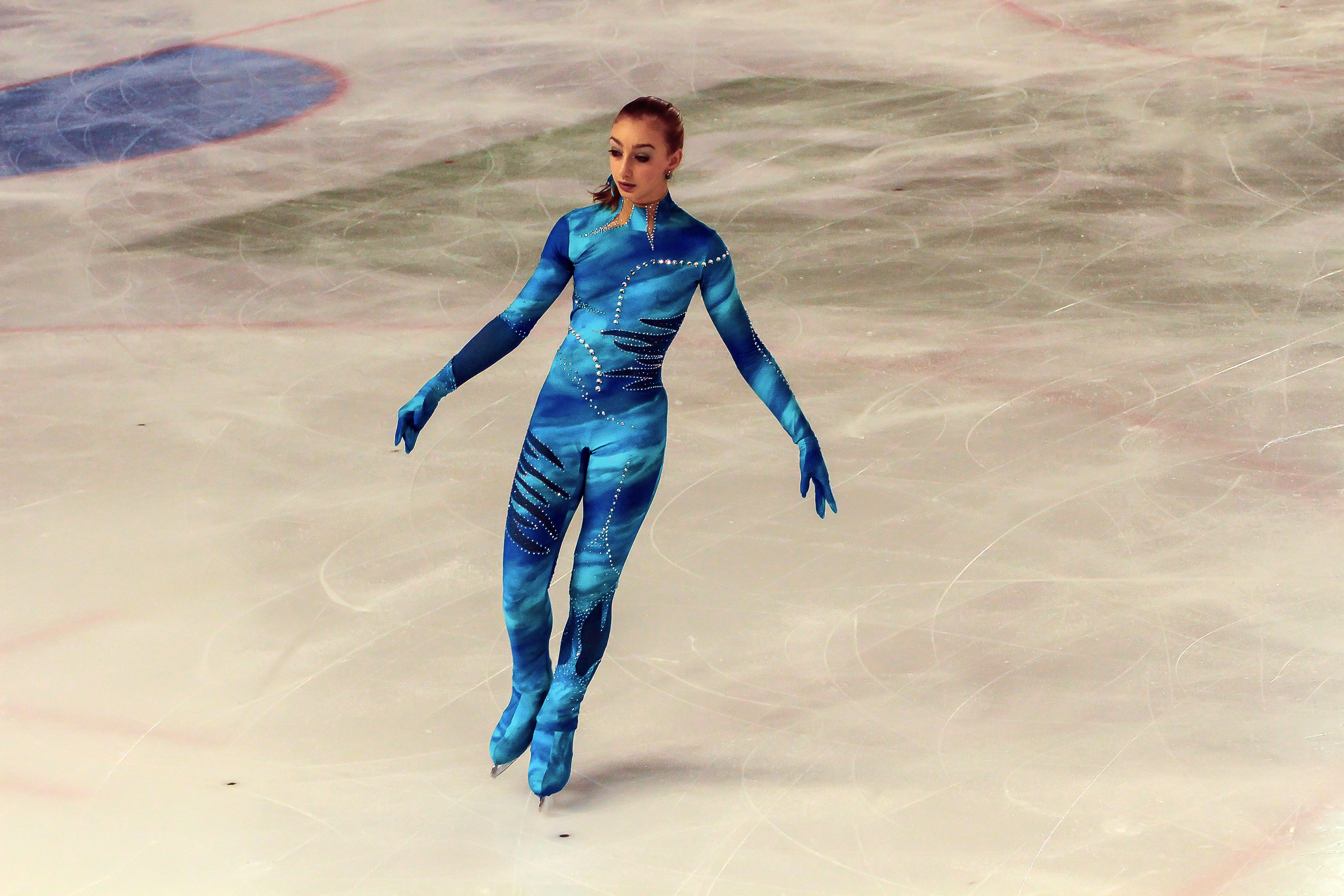
- Type: National Championships
- Date: 13–16 December 2012 (S); February 2013 (J)
- Season: 2012–13
- Location: Strasbourg
- Venue: Patinoire Iceberg

Champions
- Men's singles: Florent Amodio (S); Simon Hocquayx (J)
- Ladies' singles: Anaïs Ventard (S); Laurine Lecavelier (J)
- Pairs: Vanessa James / Morgan Ciprès
- Ice dance: Nathalie Pechalat / Fabian Bourzat (S); Gabriella Papadakis / Guillaume Cizeron (J)
- Previous: 2012 French Championships
- Next: 2014 French Championships

The 2013 French Figure Skating Championships took place between 13 and 16 December 2012 at the Patinoire Iceberg in Strasbourg. Medals were awarded in the disciplines of men's singles, ladies' singles, pair skating, ice dancing, and synchronized skating on the senior level. The results were among the criteria – along with FFSG minimum scores and jump requirements – used to choose the French entries for the 2013 World Championships and the 2013 European Championships.

== Senior results ==
=== Men ===
Brian Joubert withdrew due to the flu. Florent Amodio won his second senior national title. Amodio decided to replace his short program with a shortened version of the previous season's free skating.

Rank	Name	Total points	SP		FS	
1	Florent Amodio	230.44	1	78.41	1	152.03
2	Chafik Besseghier	190.54	2	65.24	2	125.30
3	Romain Ponsart	184.24	3	59.23	3	125.01
4	Charles Tetar	175.89	4	57.23	4	118.57
5	Simon Hocquax	168.95	6	52.18	5	116.77
6	Kevin Aymoz	161.29	7	49.89	6	111.40
7	Florian Leujeune	152.51	5	56.58	7	95.93
8	Gaylord Lavoisier	136.51	8	46.19	8	90.31
9	Timofei Novaikin	130.32	9	44.55	10	85.77
10	Alexander Zahradnicek	130.28	10	42.26	9	88.02
11	Alexi Dalrymple	122.46	11	41.85	11	80.61
12	Cedric Tour	115.36	12	41.33	12	74.03

=== Ladies ===
Anaïs Ventard won her first senior national title.

Rank	Name	Total points	SP		FS	
1	Anaïs Ventard	154.04	2	53.49	1	100.55
2	Maé Bérénice Méité	153.48	1	54.19	2	99.29
3	Laurine Lecavelier	145.20	3	51.99	3	93.21
4	Lénaëlle Gilleron-Gorry	134.91	4	51.23	6	83.68
5	Léna Marrocco	131.48	5	44.36	4	87.12
6	Bahia Taleb	128.40	6	43.04	5	85.36
7	Nadjma Mahamoud	123.43	7	42.14	7	81.29
8	Laurianne Cirilli	100.47	9	30.81	8	69.66
9	Gabrielle Scalzo	92.27	10	28.27	9	64.00
10	Flora Leblanc	82.49	8	33.40	10	49.09

=== Pairs ===
Vanessa James / Morgan Ciprès won their first senior national title.

Rank	Name	Total points	SP		FS	
1	Vanessa James / Morgan Ciprès	162.01	1	58.21	1	103.80
2	Daria Popova / Bruno Massot	134.54	2	47.90	2	86.64

=== Ice dancing ===
Nathalie Péchalat / Fabian Bourzat won their fourth senior national title.

Rank	Name	Total points	SP		FS	
1	Nathalie Péchalat / Fabian Bourzat	177.21	1	70.68	1	106.53
2	Pernelle Carron / Lloyd Jones	148.09	2	57.27	2	90.82
3	Sarah Robert-Sifaoui / Oleksandr Liubchenko	89.36	3	39.93	3	49.43

=== Synchronized ===
Rank	Name	Club	Total points	SP		FS	
1	Les Zoulous	LYON	121.59	1	42.60	1	78.99
2	Team Synchro Energie	LOUVI	115.76	3	38.02	2	77.74
3	Les Atlantides	BORDE	111.25	2	39.57	3	71.68
4	Ex-L' Ice	COMPI	102.52	4	36.56	4	65.96

== Junior results ==
The French Junior Championships were held in February 2013.

=== Men ===
Rank	Name	Total points
1	Simon Hocquaux	172.57
2	Charles Tetar	166.05
3	Kévin Aymoz	155.20
4	Noël-Antoine Pierre	143.58
5	Paul Arrateig	122.69
6	Maxime Petraru	119.88
7	Cédric Tour	111.28
8	Joshua Lamboley	104.06
9	Luc Schnoebelen	94.08

=== Ladies ===
Rank	Name	Total points
1	Laurine Lecavelier	128.29
2	Bahia Taleb	125.78
3	Nadjma Mahamoud	125.22
4	Laurianne Cirilli	109.96
5	Carla Monzali	93.62
6	Ycette Loulendot	92.76
7	Gabrielle Scalzo	87.38
8	Sonia Alves	84.90
9	Fulvia Le Guen	70.87

=== Ice dancing ===
Rank	Name	Total points
1	Gabriella Papadakis / Guillaume Cizeron	144.61
2	Estelle Elizabeth / Romain Le Gac	127.87
3	Péroline Ojardias / Pierre Souquet	112.19
4	Magali Leininger / Maxime Caurel	110.01
5	Myriam Gassoumi / Clément Le Molaire	106.79
6	Valentina Rudchenko / Benjamin Allain	102.35
7	Audrey Madelon / Frantz-Michaël Rouffanche	98.24
8	Mathilde Harold / Axel Lamasse	92.62
9	Angélique Abachkina / Louis Thauron	89.87
10	Sabina Adigamova / Kévin Bellingard	85.25

Eight other ice dance teams competed.
