= 2012 Trophée Éric Bompard =

Figure skating competition

- Type: Grand Prix
- Date: November 15 – 18
- Season: 2012–13
- Location: Paris
- Host: Federation Française des Sports de Glace
- Venue: Palais Omnisports de Paris Bercy

Champions
- Men's singles: (Japan) Takahito Mura
- Ladies' singles: (United States) Ashley Wagner
- Pairs: (Russia) Yuko Kavaguti / Alexander Smirnov
- Ice dance: (France) Nathalie Pechalat / Fabian Bourzat
- Previous: 2011 Trophée Éric Bompard
- Next: 2013 Trophée Éric Bompard
- Previous Grand Prix: 2012 Cup of Russia
- Next Grand Prix: 2012 NHK Trophy

The 2012 Trophée Éric Bompard the fifth event of six in the 2012–13 ISU Grand Prix of Figure Skating, a senior-level international invitational competition series. It was held at the Palais Omnisports de Paris Bercy in Paris on November 15–18. Medals were awarded in the disciplines of men's singles, ladies' singles, pair skating, and ice dancing. Skaters earned points toward qualifying for the 2012–13 Grand Prix Final.

== Eligibility ==
Skaters who reached the age of 14 by July 1, 2012 were eligible to compete on the senior Grand Prix circuit.

Prior to competing in a Grand Prix event, skaters were required to have earned the following scores (3/5 of the top scores at the 2012 World Championships):

| Discipline | Minimum |
|---|---|
| Men | 159.66 |
| Ladies | 113.43 |
| Pairs | 120.90 |
| Ice dancing | 109.59 |

== Entries ==
The entries were as follows.

| Country | Men | Ladies | Pairs | Ice dancing |
|---|---|---|---|---|
| Azerbaijan | | | | Julia Zlobina / Alexei Sitnikov |
| Belgium | Jorik Hendrickx | | | |
| Canada | | | Meagan Duhamel / Eric Radford | Piper Gilles / Paul Poirier |
| China | Jinlin Guan; Song Nan | | Peng Cheng / Zhang Hao | |
| Czech Republic | Tomáš Verner | | | |
| Estonia | | Jelena Glebova | | |
| France | Florent Amodio; Chafik Besseghier; Brian Joubert | Léna Marrocco; Maé Bérénice Méité | Daria Popova / Bruno Massot; Vanessa James / Morgan Ciprès | Pernelle Carron / Lloyd Jones; Nathalie Péchalat / Fabian Bourzat |
| United Kingdom | | Jenna McCorkell | | |
| Italy | | | Stefania Berton / Ondřej Hotárek | Anna Cappellini / Luca Lanotte |
| Japan | Takahito Mura | | | |
| Russia | | Polina Korobeynikova; Yulia Lipnitskaya; Elizaveta Tuktamysheva | Yuko Kavaguti / Alexander Smirnov; Ksenia Stolbova / Fedor Klimov | Ekaterina Pushkash / Jonathan Guerreiro; Ekaterina Riazanova / Ilia Tkachenko |
| Sweden | | Joshi Helgesson | | |
| United States | Jeremy Abbott | Ashley Wagner; Christina Gao | | Madison Hubbell / Zachary Donohue |

Italy's Carolina Kostner withdrew from the ladies' event due to insufficient fitness, the United States' Johnny Weir withdrew due to a right hip injury, and Germany's Aliona Savchenko / Robin Szolkowy withdrew as a result of Savchenko's severe sinus infection.

== Overview ==
Jeremy Abbott of the United States was first in the men's short program, followed by Japan's Takahito Mura and France's Brian Joubert. Mura was also second in the free skating but finished first overall and took his first Grand Prix title, while Abbott took silver, and France's Florent Amodio – 7th in the short – won the segment and rose to third overall. Jorik Hendrickx withdrew before the free skating due to a twisted ankle in an off-ice warm up.

Despite spraining her right ankle before the start of the competition, Russia's Yulia Lipnitskaya placed first in the ladies' short program ahead of the United States' Ashley Wagner and Russia's Elizaveta Tuktamysheva. Wagner won the free skating and her second Grand Prix title, Tuktamysheva rose to take the silver, and Lipnitskaia finished with the bronze.

Russia's Yuko Kavaguti / Alexander Smirnov won the pairs' short program by over four points ahead of Canada's Meagan Duhamel / Eric Radford, with China's Peng Cheng / Zhang Hao in third. Kavaguti / Smirnov were second in the free skating but their lead from the short program took them to the gold medal, Duhamel / Radford were first in the free skating and finished second overall, and Italy's Stefania Berton / Ondrej Hotarek rose to take the bronze medal despite placing 5th in the segment.

France's Nathalie Pechalat were first in the short dance, followed by Italy's Anna Cappellini / Luca Lanotte and Russia's Ekaterina Riazanova / Ilia Tkachenko. In the free dance, Pechalat / Bourzat maintained their lead and won the gold medal, Cappellini / Lanotte were fourth in the segment but held on to second place overall, and Riazanova / Tkachenko finished in third.

== Results ==
=== Men ===
| Rank | Name | Nation | Total points | SP | | FS | |
|---|---|---|---|---|---|---|---|
| 1 | Takahito Mura | Japan | 230.68 | 2 | 76.65 | 2 | 154.03 |
| 2 | Jeremy Abbott | United States | 227.63 | 1 | 81.18 | 3 | 146.45 |
| 3 | Florent Amodio | France | 214.25 | 7 | 60.13 | 1 | 154.12 |
| 4 | Brian Joubert | France | 210.16 | 3 | 75.46 | 5 | 134.70 |
| 5 | Song Nan | China | 205.48 | 6 | 65.75 | 4 | 139.73 |
| 6 | Guan Jinlin | China | 191.99 | 5 | 65.77 | 6 | 126.22 |
| 7 | Chafik Besseghier | France | 183.32 | 8 | 58.28 | 7 | 125.04 |
| 8 | Tomáš Verner | Czech Republic | 181.72 | 9 | 57.40 | 8 | 124.32 |
| WD | Jorik Hendrickx | Belgium | | 4 | 68.90 | | |

=== Ladies ===
| Rank | Name | Nation | Total points | SP | | FS | |
|---|---|---|---|---|---|---|---|
| 1 | Ashley Wagner | United States | 190.63 | 2 | 63.09 | 1 | 127.54 |
| 2 | Elizaveta Tuktamysheva | Russia | 179.62 | 3 | 58.26 | 2 | 121.36 |
| 3 | Yulia Lipnitskaya | Russia | 179.31 | 1 | 63.55 | 3 | 115.76 |
| 4 | Christina Gao | United States | 164.71 | 7 | 52.55 | 4 | 112.16 |
| 5 | Maé Bérénice Méité | France | 157.58 | 4 | 54.83 | 5 | 102.75 |
| 6 | Polina Korobeynikova | Russia | 144.82 | 5 | 54.50 | 7 | 90.32 |
| 7 | Jelena Glebova | Estonia | 140.86 | 6 | 52.61 | 9 | 88.25 |
| 8 | Jenna McCorkell | United Kingdom | 135.40 | 10 | 43.15 | 6 | 92.25 |
| 9 | Joshi Helgesson | Sweden | 133.77 | 9 | 45.19 | 8 | 88.58 |
| 10 | Léna Marrocco | France | 132.44 | 8 | 48.86 | 10 | 83.58 |

=== Pairs ===
| Rank | Name | Nation | Total points | SP | | FS | |
|---|---|---|---|---|---|---|---|
| 1 | Yuko Kavaguti / Alexander Smirnov | Russia | 187.99 | 1 | 66.78 | 2 | 121.21 |
| 2 | Meagan Duhamel / Eric Radford | Canada | 186.71 | 2 | 62.28 | 1 | 124.43 |
| 3 | Stefania Berton / Ondřej Hotárek | Italy | 169.49 | 4 | 57.30 | 5 | 112.19 |
| 4 | Peng Cheng / Zhang Hao | China | 167.76 | 3 | 59.92 | 6 | 107.84 |
| 5 | Ksenia Stolbova / Fedor Klimov | Russia | 166.73 | 5 | 53.64 | 3 | 113.09 |
| 6 | Vanessa James / Morgan Ciprès | France | 163.65 | 7 | 51.44 | 4 | 112.21 |
| 7 | Daria Popova / Bruno Massot | France | 151.34 | 6 | 52.96 | 7 | 98.38 |

=== Ice dancing ===
| Rank | Name | Nation | Total points | SD | | FD | |
|---|---|---|---|---|---|---|---|
| 1 | Nathalie Péchalat / Fabian Bourzat | France | 168.90 | 1 | 68.48 | 1 | 100.42 |
| 2 | Anna Cappellini / Luca Lanotte | Italy | 153.26 | 2 | 66.18 | 4 | 87.08 |
| 3 | Ekaterina Riazanova / Ilia Tkachenko | Russia | 146.03 | 3 | 58.23 | 3 | 87.80 |
| 4 | Madison Hubbell / Zachary Donohue | United States | 145.23 | 4 | 56.54 | 2 | 88.69 |
| 5 | Julia Zlobina / Alexei Sitnikov | Azerbaijan | 140.30 | 5 | 54.76 | 5 | 85.54 |
| 6 | Piper Gilles / Paul Poirier | Canada | 135.86 | 6 | 51.99 | 6 | 83.87 |
| 7 | Ekaterina Pushkash / Jonathan Guerreiro | Russia | 128.26 | 7 | 49.88 | 7 | 78.38 |
| 8 | Pernelle Carron / Lloyd Jones | France | 120.23 | 8 | 48.35 | 8 | 71.88 |
