= 2012 French Figure Skating Championships =

Figure skating competition

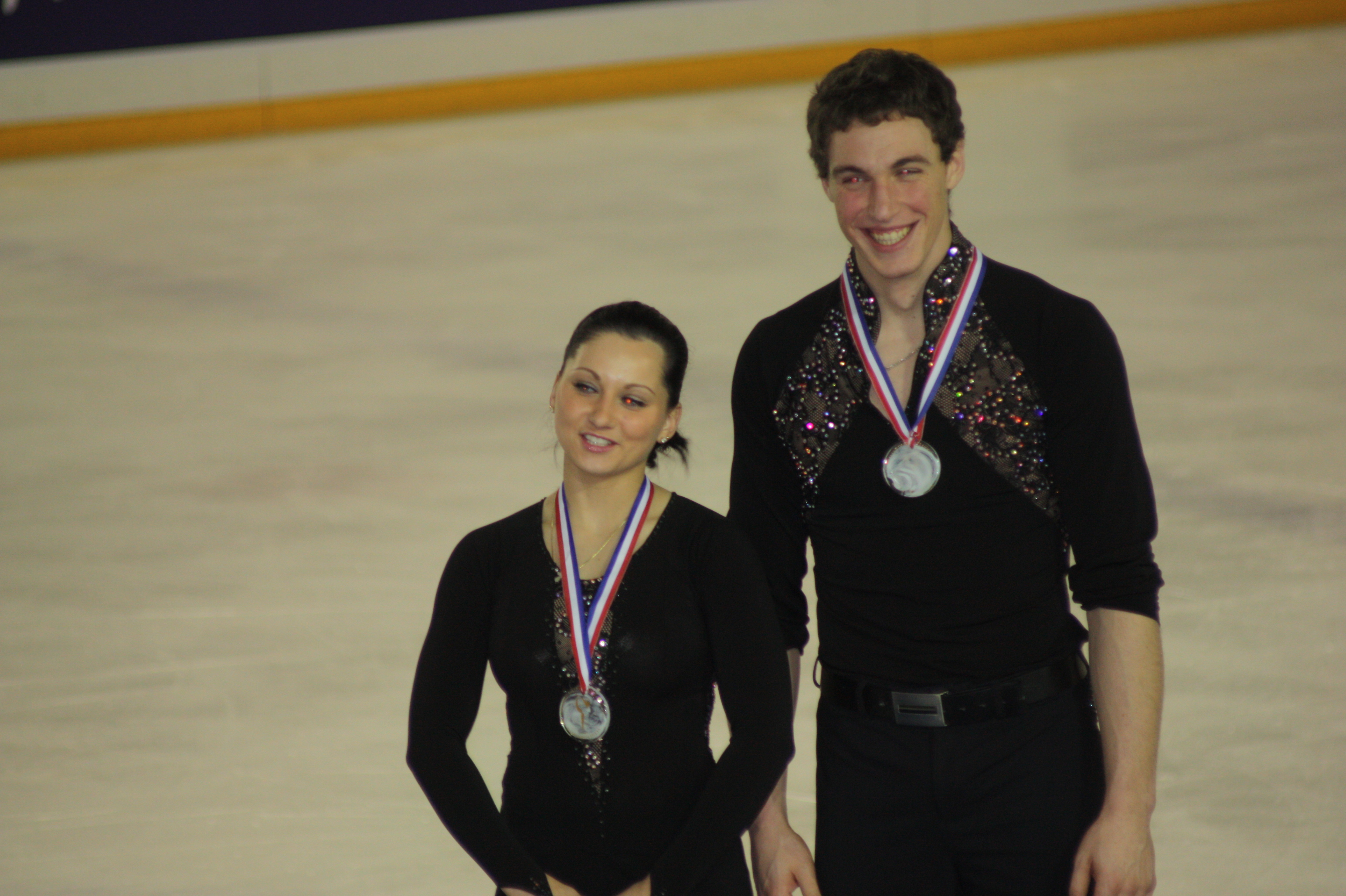
- Type: National Championships
- Date: 16–18 December 2011 (S); 24–26 February 2012 (J)
- Season: 2011–12
- Location: Dammarie-lès-Lys (S); Charleville-Mézières (J)
- Venue: Patinoire de la Cartonnerie (S)

Champions
- Men's singles: Brian Joubert (S); Noël-Antoine Pierre (J)
- Ladies' singles: Yretha Silete (S); Anaïs Ventard (J)
- Pairs: Daria Popova / Bruno Massot (S)
- Ice dance: Nathalie Péchalat / Fabian Bourzat (S); Estelle Elizabeth / Romain Legac (J)
- Synchronized skating: Les Zoulous
- Previous: 2011 French Championships
- Next: 2013 French Championships

The 2012 French Figure Skating Championships took place between 16 and 18 December 2011 at the Patinoire de la Cartonnerie in Dammarie-lès-Lys. Skaters competed in the disciplines of men's singles, ladies' singles, pair skating, ice dancing, and synchronized skating on the senior level for the title of national champion of France. The results were among the criteria used to choose the French entries for the 2012 World Championships and the 2012 European Championships.

== Senior results ==
=== Men ===
Joubert won his 8th national title.

Rank	Name	Total points	SP		FS	
1	Brian Joubert	230.97	1	81.38	1	149.59
2	Florent Amodio	210.42	2	79.23	2	131.19
3	Chafik Besseghier	183.67	3	62.53	3	121.14
4	Noël-Antoine Pierre	159.87	4	54.27	5	105.60
5	Charles Tetar	158.32	5	51.93	4	106.39
6	Simon Hocquaux	149.89	6	49.31	6	100.58
7	Adrien Tesson	142.47	9	42.28	7	100.19
8	Gaylord Lavoisier	138.46	12	39.15	8	99.31
9	Aurélien Robert	135.65	7	47.74	10	87.91
10	Timofei Novaikin	132.61	10	41.85	9	90.76
11	Maxime Petraru	125.81	8	43.04	11	82.77
12	Dimitri Christodoulides	114.14	11	40.37	12	73.77

=== Ladies ===
Silété won the ladies' title.

Rank	Name	Total points	SP		FS	
1	Yrétha Silété	152.21	1	53.18	2	99.03
2	Maé Bérénice Méité	149.33	2	50.20	1	99.13
3	Anaïs Ventard	143.74	4	47.18	3	96.56
4	Léna Marrocco	134.48	3	50.04	4	84.44
5	Lénaëlle Gilleron-Gorry	129.03	5	45.37	5	83.66
6	Laurine Lecavelier	121.79	7	39.52	6	82.27
7	Laurianne Cirilli	114.63	9	36.69	7	77.94
8	Bahia Taleb	112.03	6	40.18	8	71.85
9	Flora Leblanc	107.46	8	38.37	9	69.09
10	Gabrielle Scalzo	98.22	10	34.02	10	64.20
11	Aline Zerourou	95.13	11	31.14	11	63.99
12	Sarah Feriaux-Rubin	83.34	12	24.88	12	58.46

=== Pairs ===
Popova / Massot won their first title.

Rank	Name	Total points	SP		FS	
1	Daria Popova / Bruno Massot	137.75	2	46.99	1	90.76
2	Vanessa James / Morgan Ciprès	128.83	1	53.84	2	74.99
3	Anne-Laure Letscher / Artem Patlasov	104.06	3	38.01	3	66.05

=== Ice dancing ===
Péchalat / Bourzat won their third national title.

Rank	Name	Total points	SD		FD	
1	Nathalie Péchalat / Fabian Bourzat	173.75	1	68.31	1	105.44
2	Pernelle Carron / Lloyd Jones	142.69	2	55.88	2	86.81
3	Tiffany Zahorski / Alexis Miart	120.49	3	47.38	3	73.11
4	Charlène Denize / Quentin Langlois	94.02	4	38.02	6	56.00
5	Harmonie Lafont / Stanislas Etzol	91.35	5	34.40	5	56.95
6	Elektra Hetman / Benjamin Allain	91.22	6	32.35	4	58.87

== Junior results ==
The Junior Championships took place from 24 to 26 February 2012 in Charleville-Mézières.

=== Men ===
Rank	Name	Club	Total points	SP		FS	
1	Noël-Antoine Pierre	GREIM	161.18	1	53.99	1	107.19
2	Charles Tetar	CHAMP	142.34	3	51.37	3	90.97
3	Gaylord Lavoisier	DAMMA	138.81	5	42.99	2	95.82
4	Adrien Tesson	CHERB	130.18	2	51.67	6	78.51
5	Alexi Dalrymple	FVP	127.71	4	46.21	4	81.50
6	Timofei Novaikin	COLMA	121.36	6	40.49	5	80.87
7	Paul Arrateig	ROUEN	112.42	7	38.83	7	73.59
8	Cedric Tour	NICE	102.90	8	36.06	8	66.84
9	Joshua Lamboley	BESAN	99.26	9	33.77	9	65.49
10	Gregoire Appelhans	NICE	95.81	10	32.32	10	63.49

=== Ladies ===
Rank	Name	Club	Total points	SP		FS	
1	Anaïs Ventard	ANNEC	126.29	1	47.77	3	78.52
2	Laurianne Cirilli	ANNEC	123.22	2	43.02	2	80.20
3	Laurine Lecavelier	GARGE	114.71	6	33.14	1	81.57
4	Flora Leblanc	CERGY	110.33	3	37.89	5	72.44
5	Bahia Taleb	ANNEC	108.20	5	35.66	4	72.54
6	Ycette Loulendot	BOULO	90.25	4	36.99	8	53.26
7	Gabrielle Scalzo	CHAMB	88.32	7	33.12	6	55.20
8	Laura Fischer	COLOM	84.30	8	29.67	7	54.63
9	Sarah Feriaux-Rubin	CHAMP	80.70	9	27.65	9	53.05

=== Ice dancing ===
Rank	Name	Club	Total points	SD		FD	
1	Estelle Elizabeth / Romain Legac	LSG	115.69	2	44.73	1	70.96
2	Magali Leininger / Maxime Caurel	LGP	110.95	1	45.04	2	65.91
3	Myriam Gassoumi / Clément Le Molaire	LGP	103.72	3	41.63	4	62.09
4	Lindsay Pousset / Louis Thauron	VIR	100.46	10	37.71	3	62.75
5	Valentina Rudchenko / Artur Reggiani	LSG	99.19	6	40.43	5	58.76
6	Roxane Battu / Lucas Poirot	EPI	99.02	5	41.21	7	57.81
7	Olivia Dufour / Brian Scheuer	VIR	98.36	4	41.30	8	57.06
8	Laura Boutary / Mahil Chantelauze	CLE	98.06	8	40.02	6	58.04
9	Jessica Flemin / Jérémie Flemin	VLP	94.43	9	37.78	9	56.65
10	Péroline Ojardias / Pierre Souquet	LSG	93.24	7	40.12	10	53.12
11	Tara Rols / François Mallet	LGP	87.09	12	34.00	11	53.09
12	Cecile Postiaux / Richard Postiaux	VLP	85.69	11	34.82	13	50.87
13	Agathe Leger / Adrien Battu	EPI	83.62	13	31.49	12	52.13
14	Margaux Abib-Gruet / Grégory Brissaud	LSG	73.11	14	29.76	14	43.35
15	Juliette Vincent / Paul Vincent	EPI	68.76	15	25.64	15	43.12
16	Lisa Loze / Dylan Antunes	VLP	56.90	16	23.12	16	33.78
17	Justine Scache / Ludovic Deschamps-Colonval	FON	52.67	17	21.46	18	31.21
18	Laetitia Kegozzi / Maël Demougeot	BEL	50.87	18	18.26	17	32.61
