= 2017 Skate Canada International =

- Type: Grand Prix
- Date: October 27 – 29
- Season: 2017–18
- Location: Regina, Saskatchewan
- Host: Skate Canada
- Venue: Brandt Centre

Champions
- Men's singles: (Japan) Shoma Uno
- Ladies' singles: (Canada) Kaetlyn Osmond
- Pairs: (Canada) Meagan Duhamel / Eric Radford
- Ice dance: (Canada) Tessa Virtue / Scott Moir
- Previous: 2016 Skate Canada International
- Next: 2018 Skate Canada International
- Previous Grand Prix: 2017 Rostelecom Cup
- Next Grand Prix: 2017 Cup of China

The 2017 Skate Canada International was the second event of the 2017–18 ISU Grand Prix of Figure Skating, a senior-level international invitational competition series, held at the Brandt Centre in Regina, Saskatchewan from October 27–29, 2017. Medals were awarded in the disciplines of men's singles, ladies' singles, pair skating, and ice dance. Skaters earned points toward qualifying for the 2017–18 Grand Prix Final.

== Records ==
The following new ISU best scores were set during this competition:

Event	Component	Skater(s)	Score	Date	Ref
Ice dance	Short dance	(Canada) Tessa Virtue / Scott Moir	82.68	27 October 2017	
Ice dance	Total score	(Canada) Tessa Virtue / Scott Moir	199.86	28 October 2017	

== Entries ==
The ISU published the preliminary assignments on May 26, 2017.

Country	Men	Ladies	Pairs	Ice dance
Australia	Brendan Kerry	Kailani Craine		
Belgium	Jorik Hendrickx			
Canada	Patrick Chan; Keegan Messing; Nicolas Nadeau	Larkyn Austman; Alaine Chartrand; Kaetlyn Osmond	Meagan Duhamel / Eric Radford; Liubov Ilyushechkina / Dylan Moscovitch; Sydney Kolodziej / Maxime Deschamps	Carolane Soucisse / Shane Firus; Tessa Virtue / Scott Moir; Kaitlyn Weaver / Andrew Poje
China			Peng Cheng / Jin Yang	
Czech Republic	Michal Březina			
France		Laurine Lecavelier	Vanessa James / Morgan Ciprès	
Germany	Paul Fentz		Aliona Savchenko / Bruno Massot	Kavita Lorenz / Joti Polizoakis
Japan	Takahito Mura; Shoma Uno	Marin Honda; Rika Hongo		
Poland				Natalia Kaliszek / Maksym Spodyriev
Russia	Alexander Samarin	Anna Pogorilaya; Maria Sotskova	Natalia Zabiiako / Alexander Enbert	Alla Loboda / Pavel Drozd
South Korea	Cha Jun-hwan			
Spain				Olivia Smart / Adrià Díaz
Turkey				Alisa Agafonova / Alper Uçar
United States	Jason Brown	Karen Chen; Courtney Hicks; Ashley Wagner	Haven Denney / Brandon Frazier	Kaitlin Hawayek / Jean-Luc Baker; Madison Hubbell / Zachary Donohue

=== Changes to preliminary assignments ===
Discipline	Withdrew		Added		Notes	Ref.
Discipline	Date	Skater(s)	Date	Skater(s)	Notes	Ref.
Men	—N/a		September 13	(Canada) Nicolas Nadeau	Host picks	
Ladies	—N/a		September 13	(Canada) Larkyn Austman	Host picks	
Pairs	—N/a		September 13	(Canada) Sydney Kolodziej / Maxime Deschamps	Host picks	
Men	September 29	(Russia) Maxim Kovtun	October 2	(Czech Republic) Michal Březina	Recurring injury	
Ladies	October 9	(Italy) Roberta Rodeghiero	October 11	(United States) Courtney Hicks		
Ladies	October 9	(South Korea) Kim Na-hyun	October 12	(Australia) Kailani Craine		
Men	October 9	(France) Chafik Besseghier	October 12	(Germany) Paul Fentz		

== Results ==
=== Men ===
Rank	Name	Nation	Total points	SP		FS	
1	Shoma Uno	Japan	301.10	1	103.62	1	197.48
2	Jason Brown	United States	261.14	3	90.71	2	170.43
3	Alexander Samarin	Russia	250.06	4	84.02	3	166.04
4	Patrick Chan	Canada	245.70	2	94.43	7	151.27
5	Jorik Hendrickx	Belgium	237.31	6	82.08	5	155.23
6	Michal Březina	Czech Republic	237.04	7	80.34	4	156.70
7	Nicolas Nadeau	Canada	229.43	9	74.23	6	155.20
8	Keegan Messing	Canada	217.75	5	82.17	10	135.58
9	Cha Jun-hwan	South Korea	210.32	11	68.46	8	141.86
10	Paul Fentz	Germany	201.60	10	68.48	11	133.12
11	Brendan Kerry	Australia	201.56	12	63.19	9	138.37
12	Takahito Mura	Japan	186.66	8	74.82	12	111.84

=== Ladies ===
Rank	Name	Nation	Total points	SP		FS	
1	Kaetlyn Osmond	Canada	212.91	1	76.06	1	136.85
2	Maria Sotskova	Russia	192.52	3	66.10	2	126.42
3	Ashley Wagner	United States	183.94	7	61.57	4	122.37
4	Courtney Hicks	United States	182.57	4	64.06	5	118.51
5	Marin Honda	Japan	178.24	10	52.60	3	125.64
6	Rika Hongo	Japan	176.34	6	61.60	6	114.74
7	Karen Chen	United States	170.40	5	61.77	7	108.63
8	Laurine Lecavelier	France	166.43	8	59.08	8	107.35
9	Anna Pogorilaya	Russia	156.89	2	69.05	10	87.84
10	Kailani Craine	Australia	143.03	9	54.96	9	88.07
11	Alaine Chartrand	Canada	134.17	11	46.51	11	87.66
12	Larkyn Austman	Canada	123.53	12	41.79	12	81.77

=== Pairs ===
Rank	Name	Nation	Total points	SP		FS	
1	Meagan Duhamel / Eric Radford	Canada	222.22	2	73.53	1	148.69
2	Aliona Savchenko / Bruno Massot	Germany	215.66	1	77.34	3	138.32
3	Vanessa James / Morgan Ciprès	France	214.37	3	73.04	2	141.33
4	Natalia Zabiiako / Alexander Enbert	Russia	192.70	4	69.00	4	123.70
5	Peng Cheng / Jin Yang	China	182.50	7	61.58	5	120.92
6	Liubov Ilyushechkina / Dylan Moscovitch	Canada	176.35	5	64.06	6	112.29
7	Haven Denney / Brandon Frazier	United States	172.95	6	63.26	7	109.69
8	Sydney Kolodziej / Maxime Deschamps	Canada	164.03	8	59.06	8	104.97

=== Ice dance ===
Rank	Name	Nation	Total points	SP		FS	
1	Tessa Virtue / Scott Moir	Canada	199.86	1	82.68	1	117.18
2	Kaitlyn Weaver / Andrew Poje	Canada	190.01	2	77.47	3	112.54
3	Madison Hubbell / Zachary Donohue	United States	189.43	3	76.08	2	113.35
4	Kaitlin Hawayek / Jean-Luc Baker	United States	165.20	5	63.10	4	102.10
5	Alla Loboda / Pavel Drozd	Russia	155.72	6	62.60	5	93.12
6	Olivia Smart / Adrián Díaz	Spain	154.81	4	64.34	7	90.47
7	Carolane Soucisse / Shane Firus	Canada	150.27	7	57.77	6	92.50
8	Kavita Lorenz / Joti Polizoakis	Germany	146.08	8	56.41	8	89.67
9	Natalia Kaliszek / Maksym Spodyriev	Poland	144.78	9	55.92	9	88.86
10	Alisa Agafonova / Alper Ucar	Turkey	140.83	10	54.74	10	86.09
