= 2012 Skate Canada International =

- Type: Grand Prix
- Date: October 26 – 28
- Season: 2012–13
- Location: Windsor, Ontario
- Host: Skate Canada
- Venue: WFCU Centre

Champions
- Men's singles: (Spain) Javier Fernández
- Ladies' singles: (Canada) Kaetlyn Osmond
- Pairs: (Germany) Aliona Savchenko / Robin Szolkowy
- Ice dance: (Canada) Tessa Virtue / Scott Moir
- Previous: 2011 Skate Canada International
- Next: 2013 Skate Canada International
- Previous Grand Prix: 2012 Skate America
- Next Grand Prix: 2012 Cup of China

The 2012 Skate Canada International was the second event of six in the 2012–13 ISU Grand Prix of Figure Skating, a senior-level international invitational competition series. It was held at the WFCU Centre in Windsor, Ontario on October 26–28. Medals were awarded in the disciplines of men's singles, ladies' singles, pair skating, and ice dancing. Skaters earned points toward qualifying for the 2012–13 Grand Prix Final.

== Eligibility ==
Skaters who reached the age of 14 by July 1, 2012 were eligible to compete on the 2012 senior Grand Prix circuit.

Prior to competing in a Grand Prix event, skaters were required to have earned the following scores(3/5 of the top scores at the 2012 World Championships):

| Discipline | Minimum |
|---|---|
| Men | 159.66 |
| Ladies | 113.43 |
| Pairs | 120.90 |
| Ice dancing | 109.59 |

== Entries ==
The entries were as follows.

| Country | Men | Ladies | Pairs | Ice dancing |
|---|---|---|---|---|
| Azerbaijan | | | | Julia Zlobina / Alexei Sitnikov |
| Canada | Patrick Chan; Liam Firus; Elladj Balde | Amelie Lacoste; Kaetlyn Osmond | Meagan Duhamel / Eric Radford; Paige Lawrence / Rudi Swiegers | Piper Gilles / Paul Poirier; Kharis Ralph / Asher Hill; Tessa Virtue / Scott Moir |
| France | Florent Amodio | | Daria Popova / Bruno Massot | Pernelle Carron / Lloyd Jones |
| Georgia | | Elene Gedevanishvili | | |
| Germany | | | Aliona Savchenko / Robin Szolkowy | |
| United Kingdom | | | Stacey Kemp / David King | |
| Italy | | | Stefania Berton / Ondřej Hotárek | Anna Cappellini / Luca Lanotte |
| Japan | Takahito Mura; Nobunari Oda | Kanako Murakami; Akiko Suzuki | | |
| Kazakhstan | Denis Ten | | | |
| Russia | Artur Gachinski | Ksenia Makarova; Elizaveta Tuktamysheva; Polina Shelepen | | Ekaterina Riazanova / Ilia Tkachenko |
| Spain | Javier Fernández | | | |
| United States | Ross Miner | Gracie Gold; Caroline Zhang | Lindsay Davis / Mark Ladwig; Tiffany Vise / Don Baldwin | Madison Hubbell / Zachary Donohue |

Mary Beth Marley / Rockne Brubaker withdrew from the pairs event due to the end of their partnership and Katarina Gerboldt / Alexander Enbert withdrew due to injury.

== Overview ==
Georgia's Elene Gedevanishvili won the ladies' short program by 0.24 points ahead of Canada's Kaetlyn Osmond, with Russia's Ksenia Makarova in third. Kaetlyn Osmond won the competition, but Japan's Akiko Suzuki won the free skate, climbing up from fifth to take the silver, while Japanese teammate Kanako Murakami won the bronze.

Germany's Aliona Savchenko / Robin Szolkowy took the lead in the pairs' event, almost eight points ahead of Canada's Meagan Duhamel / Eric Radford, while Italy's Stefania Berton / Ondrej Hotarek rounded out the top three after the short program. The standings remained the same after the free skate, with the Germans winning by over 21 points over the Canadians, while the Italians finishing 18 points behind in bronze. Szolkowy wore tights which the ISU does not allow for men, however, the judges decided not to impose a costume deduction.

Spain's Javier Fernández placed first in the men's short program, three points ahead of Canada's Patrick Chan and Japan's Nobunari Oda. Fernandez continued his lead, winning the competition decisively by ten points over the reigning two-time World Champion, with Oda taking the bronze.

Canada's Tessa Virtue / Scott Moir edged out Italy's Anna Cappellini / Luca Lanotte by 0.01 points to win the short dance, with Russians Ekaterina Riazanova / Ilia Tkachenko nine points behind in third. The standings remained the same after the free, with the Canadians winning by over nine points over the Italians and the Russians 17 points behind in third.

== Results ==
=== Men ===
| Rank | Name | Nation | Total points | SP | | FS | |
|---|---|---|---|---|---|---|---|
| 1 | Javier Fernández | Spain | 253.94 | 1 | 85.87 | 1 | 168.07 |
| 2 | Patrick Chan | Canada | 243.43 | 2 | 82.52 | 2 | 160.91 |
| 3 | Nobunari Oda | Japan | 238.34 | 3 | 82.14 | 3 | 156.20 |
| 4 | Florent Amodio | France | 218.72 | 5 | 74.61 | 5 | 144.11 |
| 5 | Ross Miner | United States | 213.60 | 8 | 69.41 | 4 | 144.19 |
| 6 | Denis Ten | Kazakhstan | 203.70 | 4 | 75.26 | 8 | 128.44 |
| 7 | Elladj Baldé | Canada | 199.94 | 6 | 72.46 | 9 | 127.48 |
| 8 | Takahito Mura | Japan | 199.74 | 9 | 62.10 | 6 | 137.64 |
| 9 | Artur Gachinski | Russia | 199.58 | 7 | 69.74 | 7 | 129.84 |
| 10 | Liam Firus | Canada | 169.67 | 10 | 60.50 | 10 | 109.17 |

=== Ladies ===
| Rank | Name | Nation | Total points | SP | | FS | |
|---|---|---|---|---|---|---|---|
| 1 | Kaetlyn Osmond | Canada | 176.45 | 2 | 60.56 | 2 | 115.89 |
| 2 | Akiko Suzuki | Japan | 175.16 | 5 | 55.12 | 1 | 120.04 |
| 3 | Kanako Murakami | Japan | 168.04 | 4 | 56.21 | 4 | 111.83 |
| 4 | Elizaveta Tuktamysheva | Russia | 168.00 | 6 | 55.10 | 3 | 112.90 |
| 5 | Elene Gedevanishvili | Georgia | 160.52 | 1 | 60.80 | 5 | 99.72 |
| 6 | Ksenia Makarova | Russia | 154.11 | 3 | 58.56 | 9 | 95.55 |
| 7 | Gracie Gold | United States | 151.57 | 9 | 52.19 | 6 | 99.38 |
| 8 | Amélie Lacoste | Canada | 151.44 | 7 | 53.81 | 7 | 97.63 |
| 9 | Caroline Zhang | United States | 149.87 | 8 | 52.97 | 8 | 96.90 |
| 10 | Polina Shelepen | Russia | 124.29 | 10 | 46.18 | 10 | 78.11 |

=== Pairs ===
| Rank | Name | Nation | Total points | SP | | FS | |
|---|---|---|---|---|---|---|---|
| 1 | Aliona Savchenko / Robin Szolkowy | Germany | 201.36 | 1 | 72.26 | 1 | 129.10 |
| 2 | Meagan Duhamel / Eric Radford | Canada | 190.49 | 2 | 64.49 | 2 | 126.00 |
| 3 | Stefania Berton / Ondřej Hotárek | Italy | 172.03 | 3 | 59.79 | 3 | 112.24 |
| 4 | Paige Lawrence / Rudi Swiegers | Canada | 158.33 | 4 | 52.88 | 4 | 105.45 |
| 5 | Daria Popova / Bruno Massot | France | 149.37 | 5 | 48.43 | 5 | 100.94 |
| 6 | Tiffany Vise / Don Baldwin | United States | 141.21 | 7 | 46.47 | 6 | 94.74 |
| 7 | Lindsay Davis / Mark Ladwig | United States | 122.26 | 6 | 47.05 | 7 | 75.21 |

=== Ice dancing ===
| Rank | Name | Nation | Total points | SD | | FD | |
|---|---|---|---|---|---|---|---|
| 1 | Tessa Virtue / Scott Moir | Canada | 169.41 | 1 | 65.09 | 1 | 104.32 |
| 2 | Anna Cappellini / Luca Lanotte | Italy | 160.06 | 2 | 65.08 | 2 | 94.98 |
| 3 | Ekaterina Riazanova / Ilia Tkachenko | Russia | 143.39 | 3 | 55.80 | 3 | 87.59 |
| 4 | Piper Gilles / Paul Poirier | Canada | 136.74 | 5 | 53.71 | 4 | 83.03 |
| 5 | Madison Hubbell / Zachary Donohue | United States | 135.16 | 4 | 54.84 | 6 | 80.32 |
| 6 | Julia Zlobina / Alexei Sitnikov | Azerbaijan | 132.80 | 7 | 50.92 | 5 | 81.88 |
| 7 | Pernelle Carron / Lloyd Jones | France | 130.75 | 6 | 51.67 | 7 | 79.08 |
| 8 | Kharis Ralph / Asher Hill | Canada | 126.60 | 8 | 50.00 | 8 | 76.60 |
