= Julia Zlobina =

Russian and Azerbaijani ice dancer (born 1989)

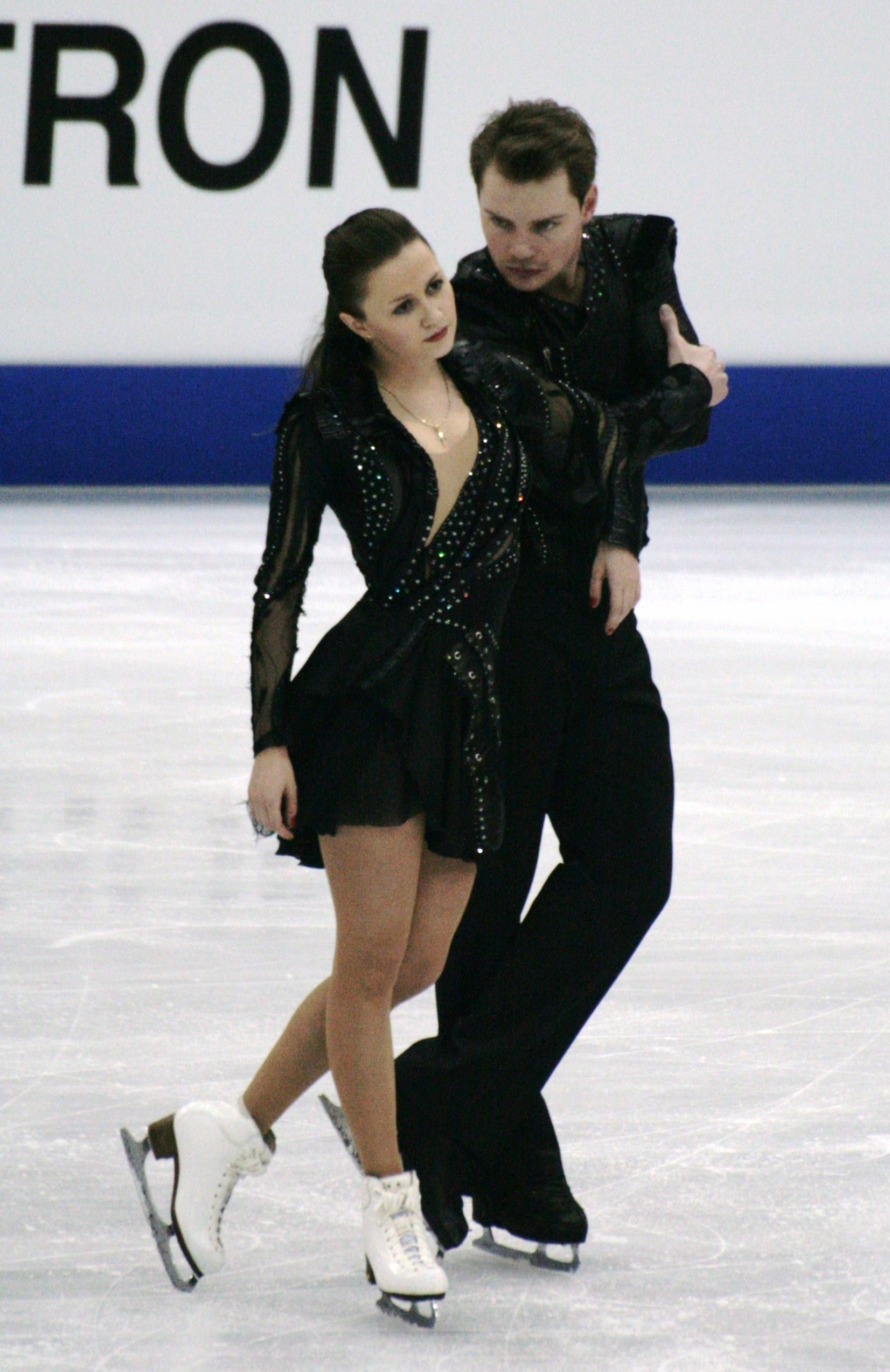
- Zlobina/Sitnikov at the 2012 Worlds

Personal information
- Full name: Julia Sergeyevna Zlobina
- Born: 28 June 1989 (age 37) Kirov, Russian SFSR, Soviet Union
- Height: 1.58 m (5 ft 2 in)

Figure skating career
- Country: Azerbaijan
- Partner: Alexei Sitnikov
- Coach: Igor Shpilband, Alexei Gorshkov
- Skating club: Neftchi Baku
- Began skating: 1994
Medal record
Representing Azerbaijan
Figure skating: Ice dancing
Winter Universiade
Silver medal – second place	2013 Trentino	Ice dancing

Julia Sergeyevna Zlobina (Russian: Юлия Серге́евна Злобина; born 28 June 1989) is a former competitive ice dancer. Competing for Azerbaijan with Alexei Sitnikov, she is the 2013 Golden Spin of Zagreb champion, 2013 Volvo Open Cup champion, 2012 Nebelhorn Trophy silver medalist, and 2013 Winter Universiade silver medalist. They competed at the 2014 Winter Olympics, finishing 12th, and have placed as high as sixth at the European Championships (2014).

== Career ==
=== Career for Russia ===
Zlobina and Sitnikov teamed up in June 2001. Early in their career, they represented Russia and were coached by Igor Gavrin and later Olga Riabinina. In 2005, they moved with Riabinina from Kirov to Rostov-on-Don. In 2006, Zlobina/Sitnikov won the bronze medal in Hungary and gold in the Czech Republic on the Junior Grand Prix circuit. Their final international event representing Russia was the 2008 Nebelhorn Trophy, where they finished 5th. In May 2009, they moved with Riabinina to Moscow and joined Elena Kustarova and Svetlana Alexeeva's group. In the 2009–10 season, Zlobina/Sitnikov made no international appearances but competed at the Russian Championships, where they finished 5th.

=== Career for Azerbaijan ===
Zlobina/Sitnikov decided to represent Azerbaijan and made their first appearance for the country at the 2011 Estonian Championships, competing as guests. In mid-2011, they switched to another Moscow-based coaching team, Alexander Zhulin and Oleg Volkov, with Zhulin also serving as their choreographer. In the 2011–12 season, Zlobina/Sitnikov won the bronze medal at the 2011 Ondrej Nepela Memorial and gold at the Istanbul Cup. Their first major international event was the 2012 European Championships, where they finished 10th. They then placed 17th at the 2012 World Championships.

Zlobina/Sitnikov began the 2012–13 season by taking gold at Ice Star in Belarus and then silver at the 2012 Nebelhorn Trophy. They finished sixth at their first Grand Prix event since 2007, the 2012 Skate Canada, and fifth at the 2012 Trophee Eric Bompard. After placing seventh at the 2013 European Championships, the team finished 16th at the 2013 World Championships and qualified a spot for Azerbaijan in the ice dancing event at the 2014 Winter Olympics.

Zlobina/Sitnikov changed coaches before the 2013–14 season, joining Igor Shpilband and Alexei Gorshkov in Novi, Michigan. They had a weak start to their season, placing eighth at the 2013 Skate America but went on win gold at the 2013 Golden Spin of Zagreb, Volvo Open Cup, and Ukrainian Open, and silver at the 2013 Winter Universiade. They placed sixth at the 2014 European Championships, a career high.

== Programs ==
(with Sitnikov)

Season	Short dance	Free dance
2013–2014	Foxtrot: Pink Panther by Henry Mancini; Quickstep: Sing, Sing, Sing by Louis Prima choreo. by Igor Shpilband, Sergei Nikulshin	Pina by Thomas Hanreich choreo. by Igor Shpilband, Sergei Nikulshin
2012–2013	Violente Valse performed by Caravan Palace; Dolly Song by Holly Dolly choreo. by Sergei Petukhov	Mahalageasca; Ausencia; Mahalageasca by Goran Bregović choreo. by Sergei Petukhov
2011–2012	La Bomba by Balli di Gruppo; Samba Vocalizado by Luciano Perrone choreo. by Alexander Zhulin	Derap; Aquarelle by René Aubry choreo. by Alexander Zhulin
2010–2011	Waltz No. 2 by Dmitri Shostakovich performed by unknown	Querer (from Cirque du Soleil's Alegría) by René Dupéré
	Original dance	
2009–2010	Shadritsa (Gypsy dance) by unknown	Tristan & Iseult by Maxime Rodriguez
2008–2009		
2007–2008	Unknown Russian folk music choreo. by N. Michura	Pirates of the Caribbean by Klaus Badelt, Hans Zimmer choreo. by N. Michura
2006–2007	Tango by unknown choreo. by Polina Silivanova	Toccata and Fugue in D minor by Johann Sebastian Bach performed by Vanessa-Mae choreo. by Polina Silivanova

== Results ==
=== With Sitnikov for Azerbaijan ===
International
Event	2010–11	2011–12	2012–13	2013–14	2014–15
Olympics				12th	
Worlds		17th	16th	12th	
Europeans		10th	7th	6th	
GP Bompard			5th		
GP Rostelecom Cup					WD
GP Skate America				8th	WD
GP Skate Canada			6th		
Universiade				2nd	
Golden Spin			2nd	1st	
Ice Star			1st		
Istanbul Cup		1st			
Nebelhorn			2nd		
NRW Trophy		5th			
Ondrej Nepela		3rd			
Ukrainian Open				1st	
U.S. Classic				6th	
Volvo Open Cup				1st	
Other
Estonian Champ.	1st (G)				

=== With Sitnikov for Russia ===
International
Event	2003–04	2004–05	2005–06	2006–07	2007–08	2008–09	2009–10
GP NHK Trophy					7th		
GP Skate Canada					9th		
Nebelhorn						5th	
International: Junior
JGP Final				6th			
JGP Bulgaria			6th				
JGP Czech Rep.				1st			
JGP Estonia			4th				
JGP Hungary				3rd			
JGP Serbia		5th					
National
Russian Champ.	8th	8th	9th	8th	6th	7th	5th
