= 2013 Trophée Éric Bompard =

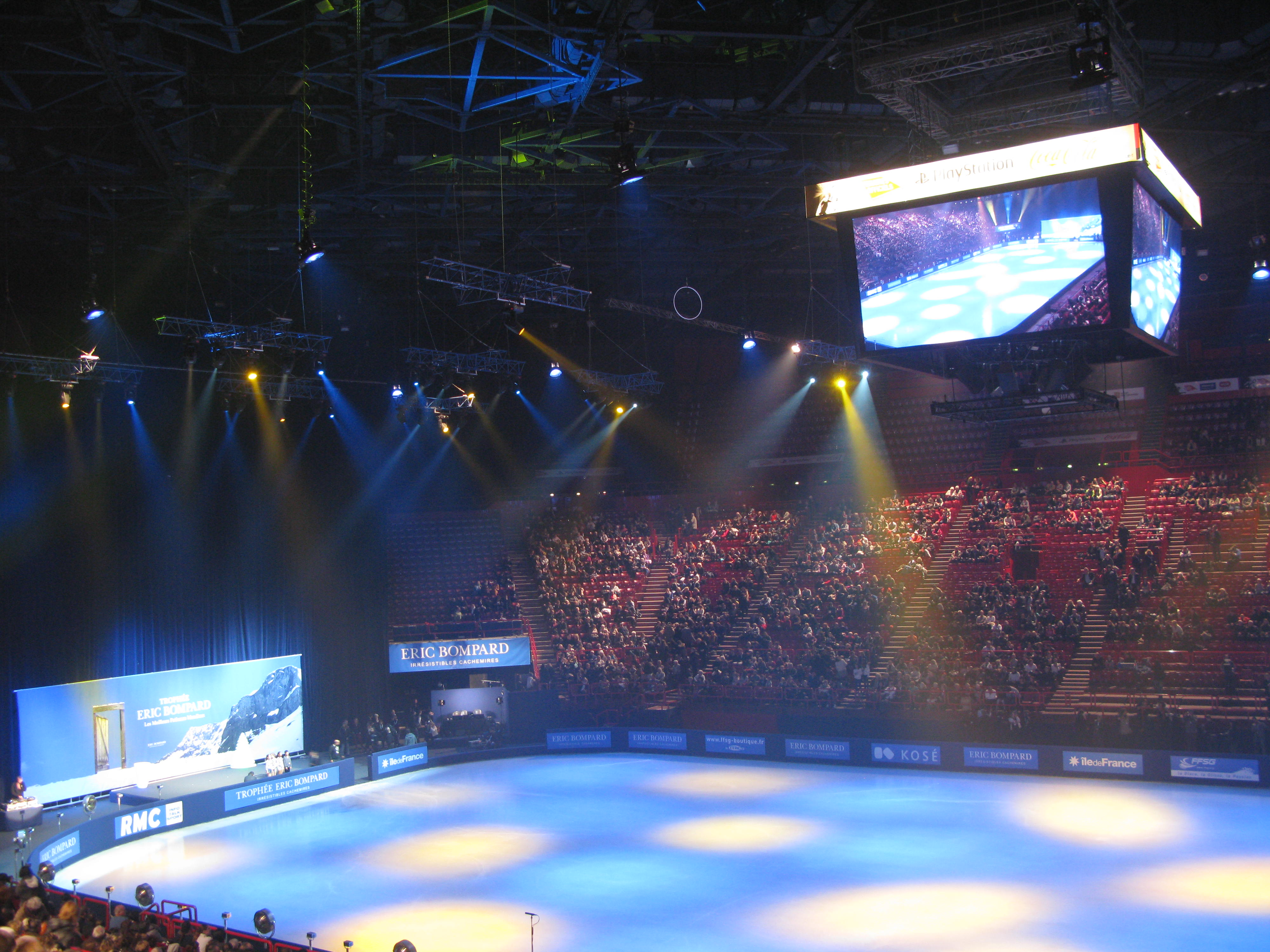
- Ice rink of Bompard 2013
- Type: Grand Prix
- Date: November 15 – 17
- Season: 2013–14
- Location: Paris
- Host: Federation Française des Sports de Glace
- Venue: Palais Omnisports de Paris Bercy

Champions
- Men's singles: (Canada) Patrick Chan
- Ladies' singles: (United States) Ashley Wagner
- Pairs: (China) Pang Qing / Tong Jian
- Ice dance: (Canada) Tessa Virtue / Scott Moir
- Previous: 2012 Trophée Éric Bompard
- Next: 2014 Trophée Éric Bompard
- Previous GP: 2013 NHK Trophy
- Next GP: 2013 Rostelecom Cup

The 2013 Trophée Éric Bompard was the fifth event of six in the 2013–14 ISU Grand Prix of Figure Skating, a senior-level international invitational competition series. It was held at the Palais Omnisports de Paris Bercy in Paris on November 15–17. Medals were awarded in the disciplines of men's singles, ladies' singles, pair skating, and ice dancing. Skaters earned points toward qualifying for the 2013–14 Grand Prix Final.

== Eligibility ==
Skaters who reached the age of 14 by July 1, 2013 were eligible to compete on the senior Grand Prix circuit.

== Entries ==
The entries were as follows.

Country	Men	Ladies	Pairs	Ice dance
Canada	Patrick Chan	Amelie Lacoste	Meagan Duhamel / Eric Radford; Natasha Purich / Mervin Tran	Nicole Orford / Thomas Williams; Tessa Virtue / Scott Moir
China	Song Nan; Yan Han		Pang Qing / Jian Tong	
Czech Republic	Michal Březina			
France	Florent Amodio	Maé Bérénice Méité	Vanessa James / Morgan Ciprès	Gabriella Papadakis / Guillaume Cizeron; Nathalie Péchalat / Fabian Bourzat
Germany			Annabelle Prolss / Ruben Blommaert	Nelli Zhiganshina / Alexander Gazsi
Great Britain				Penny Coomes / Nicholas Buckland
Italy			Nicole Della Monica / Matteo Guarise	
Japan	Yuzuru Hanyu			
Russia		Anna Pogorilaya; Adelina Sotnikova	Vera Bazarova / Yuri Larionov	Elena Ilinykh / Nikita Katsalapov; Ksenia Monko / Kirill Khaliavin
Sweden	Alexander Majorov	Viktoria Helgesson		
Ukraine		Natalia Popova		
United States	Jason Brown	Ashley Wagner; Christina Gao; Samantha Cesario	Caydee Denney / John Coughlin	

In the men's event, Romain Ponsart withdrew and was replaced by Alexander Majorov. Chafik Besseghier withdrew and was not replaced. Ross Miner withdrew due to an ankle sprain and was not replaced.

In the ladies' event, Yuna Kim withdrew due to an injury. Kiira Korpi also withdrew. They were replaced by Amelie Lacoste and Natalia Popova. Lenaelle Gilleron-Gorry withdrew and was not replaced.

In the pairs' event, Daria Popova / Bruno Massot withdrew and were replaced by Annabelle Prolss / Ruben Blommaert.

== Results ==
=== Men ===
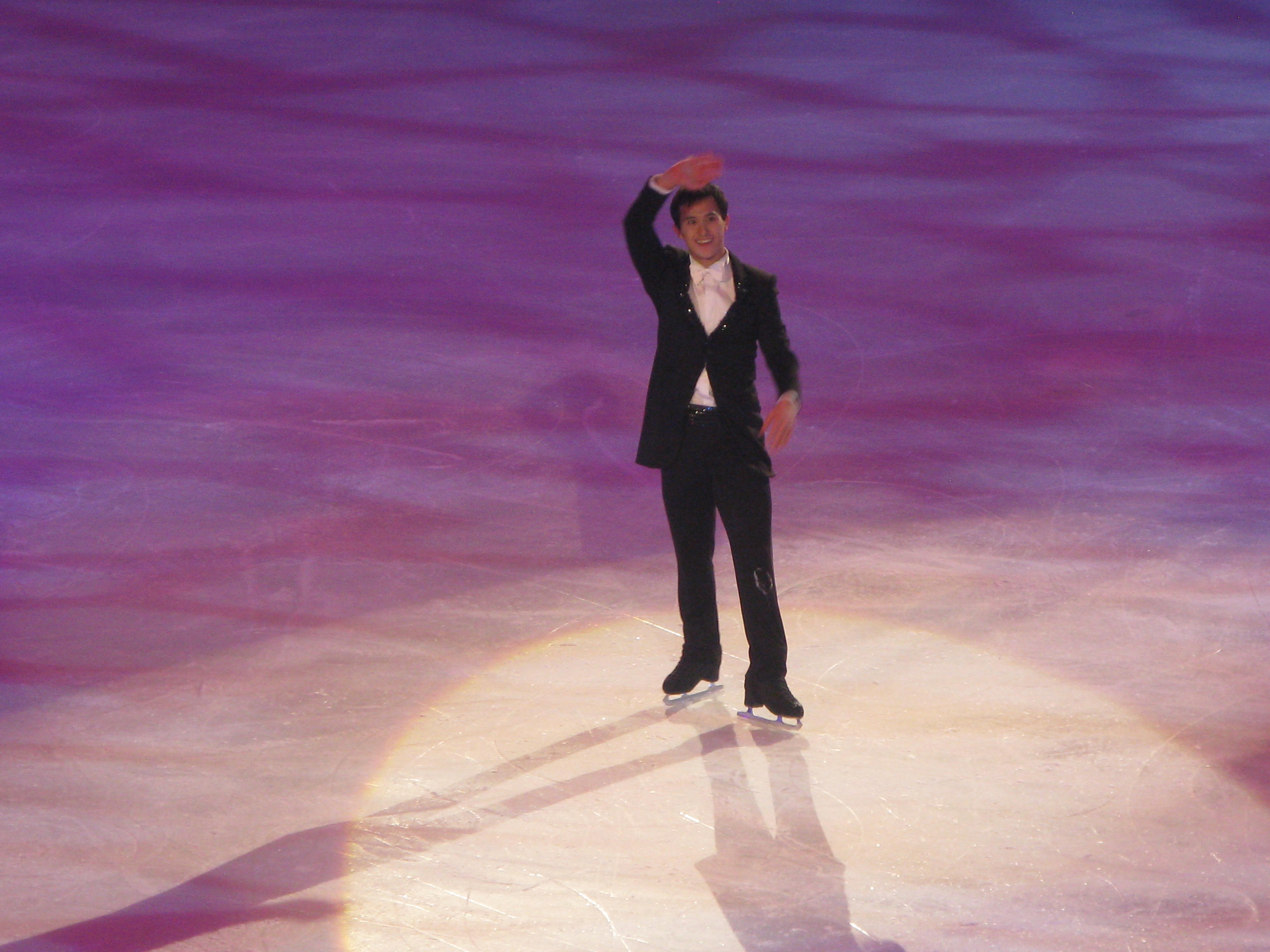
Patrick Chan

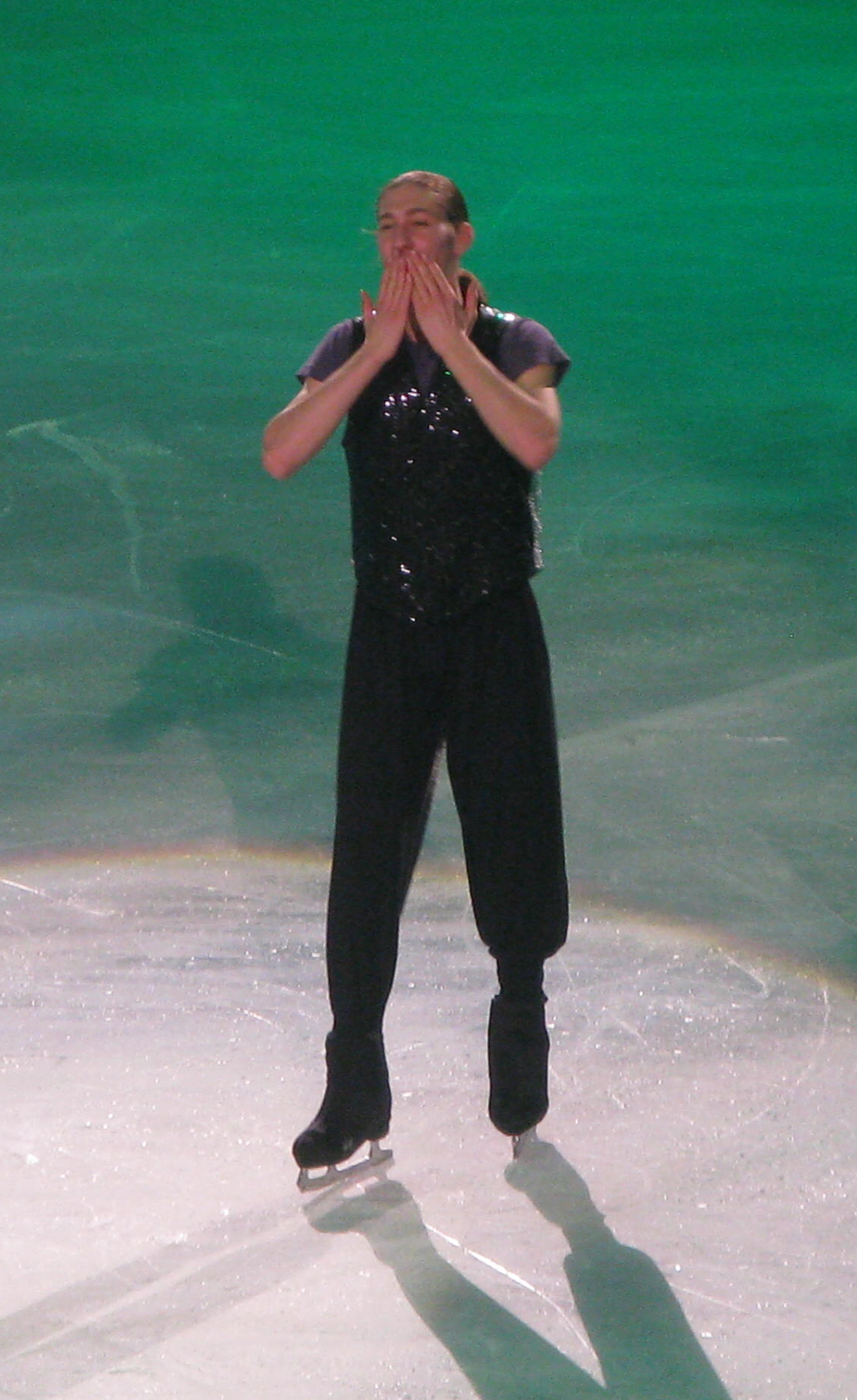
Jason Brown

Rank	Name	Nation	Total points	SP		FS	
1	Patrick Chan	Canada	295.27	1	98.52	1	196.75
2	Yuzuru Hanyu	Japan	263.59	2	95.37	2	168.22
3	Jason Brown	United States	243.09	3	84.77	3	158.32
4	Yan Han	China	214.23	4	84.34	6	129.89
5	Michal Březina	Czech Republic	206.22	6	71.91	4	134.31
6	Song Nan	China	204.73	7	71.36	5	133.37
7	Florent Amodio	France	191.13	5	73.65	8	117.48
8	Alexander Majorov	Sweden	180.62	8	59.72	7	120.90

=== Ladies ===
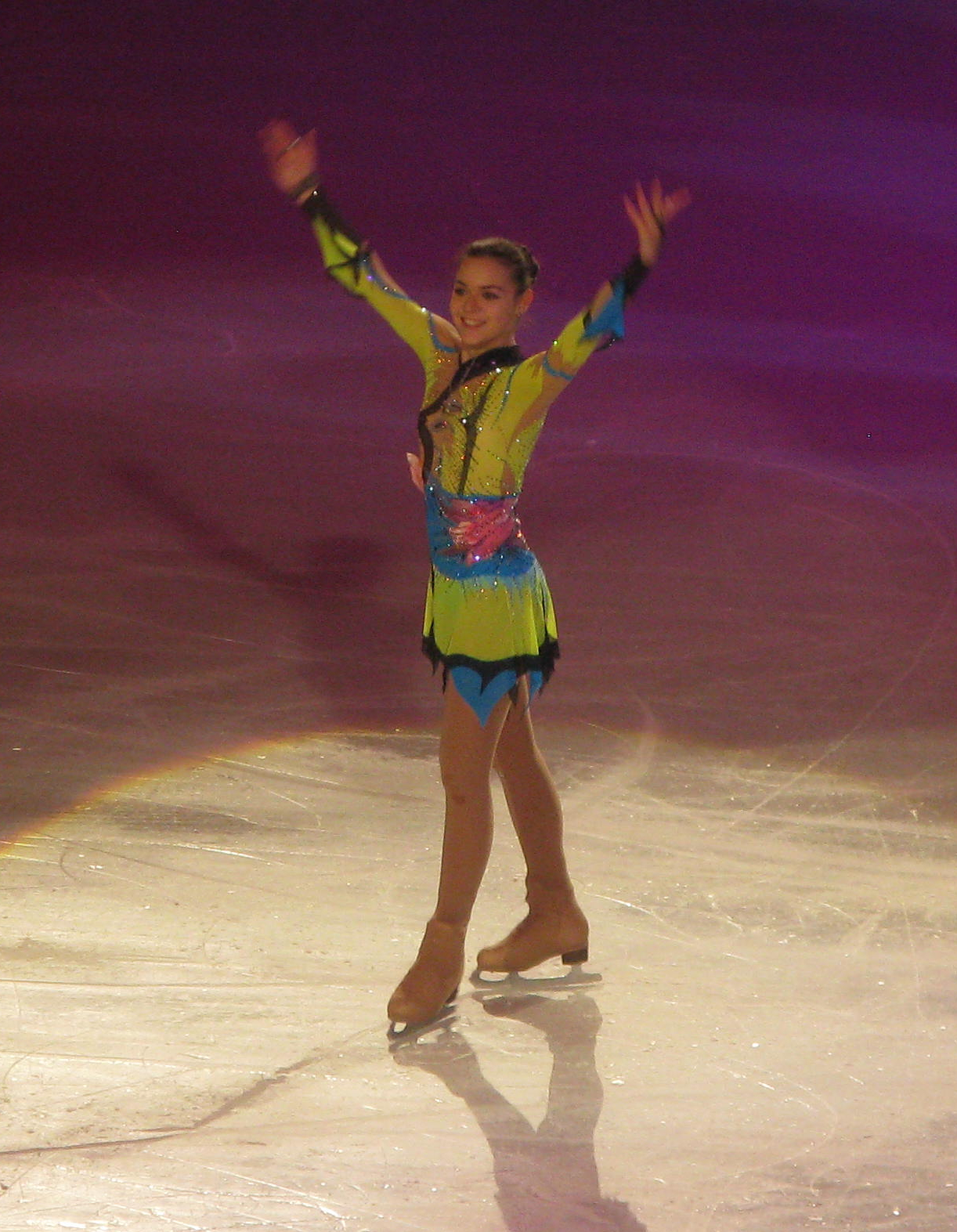
Adelina Sotnikova

Rank	Name	Nation	Total points	SP		FS	
1	Ashley Wagner	United States	194.37	1	66.75	2	127.62
2	Adelina Sotnikova	Russia	189.81	3	60.01	1	129.80
3	Anna Pogorilaya	Russia	184.69	2	60.03	3	124.66
4	Samantha Cesario	United States	172.70	5	56.55	4	116.15
5	Maé Bérénice Méité	France	166.11	6	56.50	5	109.61
6	Amélie Lacoste	Canada	158.11	7	55.92	6	102.19
7	Viktoria Helgesson	Sweden	153.27	8	53.25	7	100.02
8	Christina Gao	United States	152.85	4	58.81	8	94.04
9	Natalia Popova	Ukraine	136.43	9	50.87	9	85.56

=== Pairs ===
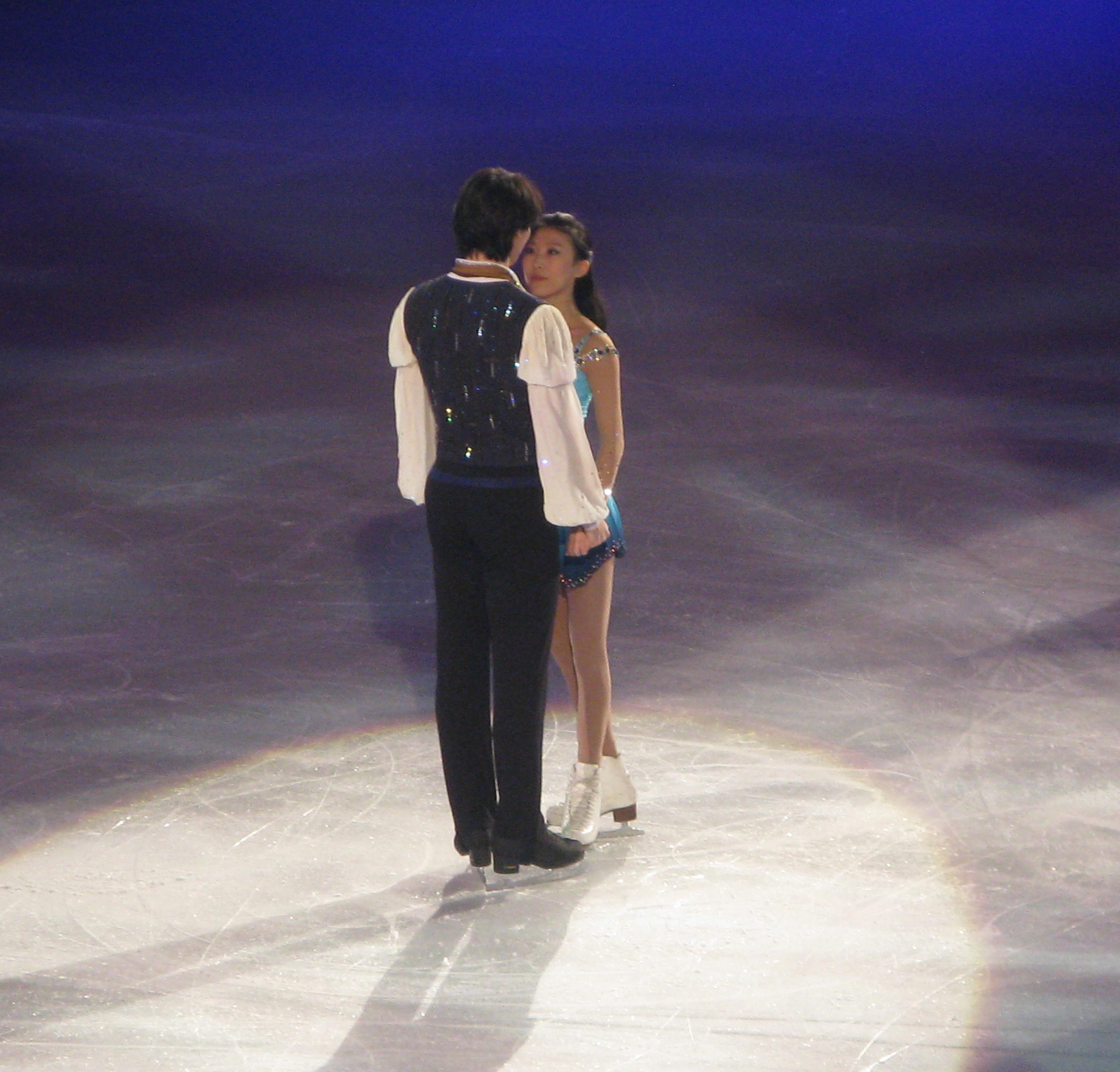
Pang Qing / Tong Jian

Rank	Name	Nation	Total points	SP		FS	
1	Pang Qing / Tong Jian	China	193.86	1	67.69	1	126.17
2	Meagan Duhamel / Eric Radford	Canada	190.89	2	66.07	2	124.82
3	Caydee Denney / John Coughlin	United States	184.01	4	63.52	3	120.49
4	Vera Bazarova / Yuri Larionov	Russia	180.07	3	65.67	5	114.40
5	Vanessa James / Morgan Ciprès	France	172.27	5	56.78	4	115.49
6	Natasha Purich / Mervin Tran	Canada	162.09	6	55.89	6	106.20
7	Annabelle Prölß / Ruben Blommaert	Germany	157.62	7	54.18	7	103.44
8	Nicole Della Monica / Matteo Guarise	Italy	147.88	8	48.59	8	99.29

=== Ice dance ===
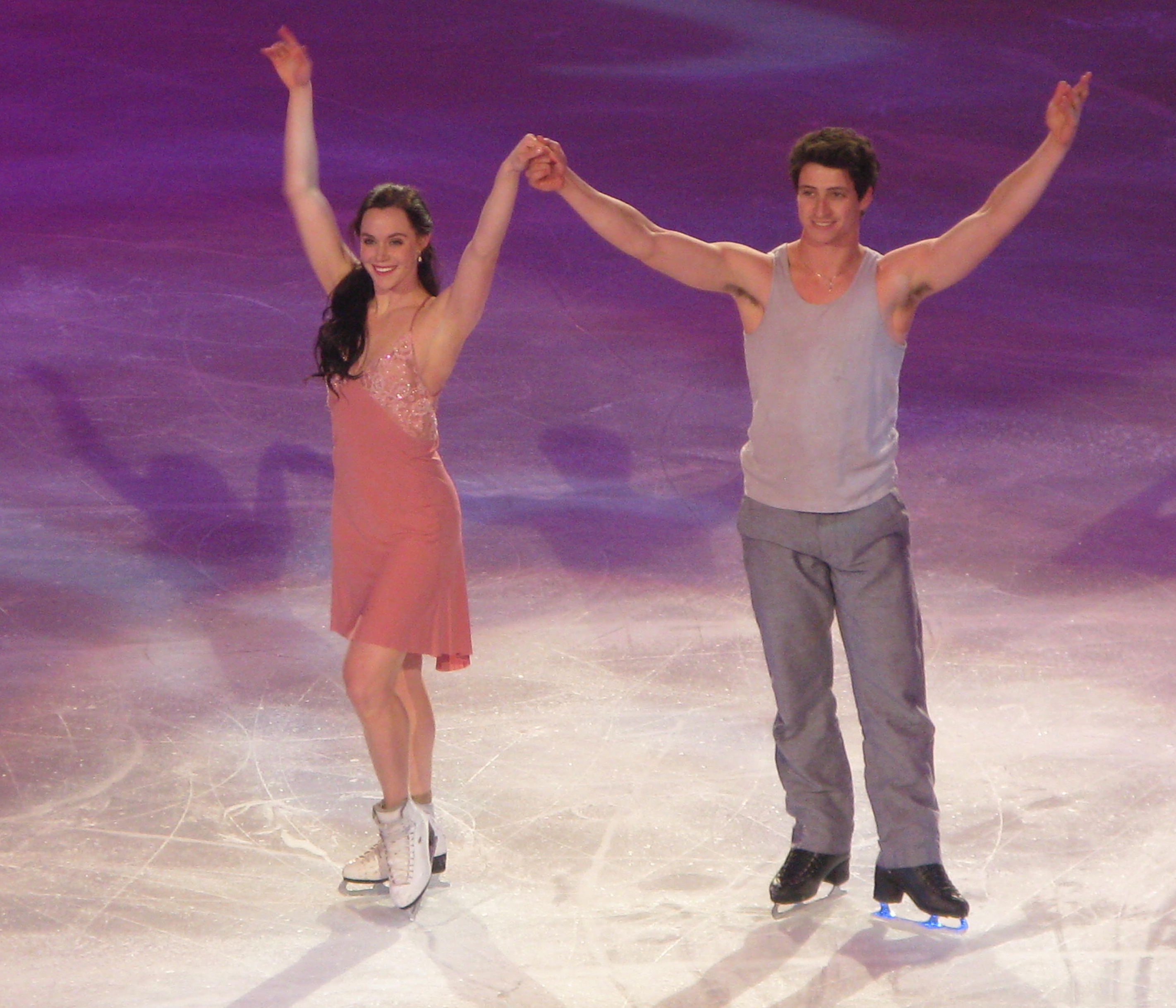
Tessa Virtue / Scott Moir

Rank	Name	Nation	Total points	SD		FD	
1	Tessa Virtue / Scott Moir	Canada	180.96	1	75.31	1	105.65
2	Elena Ilinykh / Nikita Katsalapov	Russia	171.89	3	69.07	2	102.82
3	Nathalie Péchalat / Fabian Bourzat	France	171.08	2	70.59	3	100.49
4	Nelli Zhiganshina / Alexander Gazsi	Germany	147.27	4	60.13	4	87.14
5	Gabriella Papadakis / Guillaume Cizeron	France	143.26	5	58.10	5	85.16
6	Ksenia Monko / Kirill Khaliavin	Russia	139.96	6	56.53	6	83.43
7	Penny Coomes / Nicholas Buckland	Great Britain	128.59	7	52.52	7	76.07
8	Nicole Orford / Thomas Williams	Canada	119.60	8	47.45	8	72.15
