= Bruno Massot =

French-German retired pair skater (born 1989)

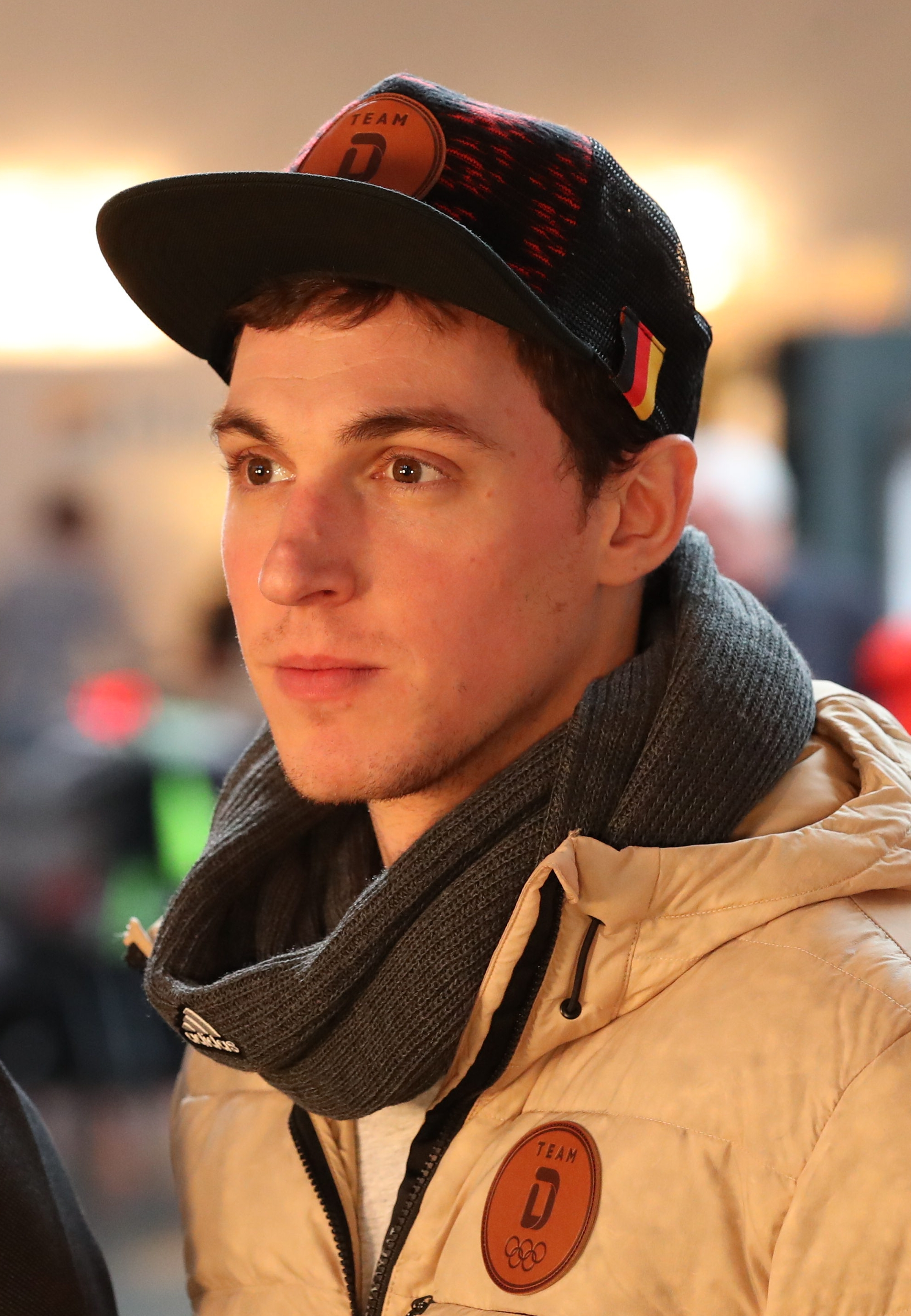
- Massot in 2018

Personal information
- Born: 28 January 1989 (age 37) Caen, France
- Home town: Caen
- Height: 1.84 m (6 ft 0 in)

Figure skating career
- Country: Germany; France (until 2014)
- Partner: Aljona Savchenko (2014–18); Daria Popova (2011–14); Anne-Laure Letscher (2010–11); Camille Foucher (2007–10)
- Coach: Alexander König, Jean-Francois Ballester
- Skating club: Acsel Caen
- Began skating: 1996
- Retired: 2018
- Highest WS: 1 (2017–18)
Event	Gold medal – first place	Silver medal – second place	Bronze medal – third place
Olympic Games	1	0	0
World Championships	1	1	1
European Championships	0	2	0
Grand Prix Final	1	0	0
German Championships	2	0	0
French Championships	1	1	3
Medal list
representing Germany
Olympic Games
Gold medal – first place	2018 Pyeongchang	Pairs
World Championships
Gold medal – first place	2018 Milan	Pairs
Silver medal – second place	2017 Helsinki	Pairs
Bronze medal – third place	2016 Boston	Pairs
European Championships
Silver medal – second place	2016 Bratislava	Pairs
Silver medal – second place	2017 Ostrava	Pairs
Grand Prix Final
Gold medal – first place	2017–18 Nagoya	Pairs
German Championships
Gold medal – first place	2016 Essen	Pairs
Gold medal – first place	2018 Frankfurt	Pairs
Medal list
representing France
French Championships
Gold medal – first place	2012 Dammarie-les-Lys	Pairs
Silver medal – second place	2013 Strasbourg	Pairs
Bronze medal – third place	2008 Megève	Pairs
Bronze medal – third place	2009 Colmar	Pairs
Bronze medal – third place	2011 Tours	Pairs

Bruno Massot (born 28 January 1989) is a French-German pair skating coach and former competitor. Competing with Aljona Savchenko for Germany, he is the 2018 Olympic Champion, the 2018 World Champion, a two-time European silver medalist, and two-time German national champion (2016, 2018).

Competing with Daria Popova for France, he became the 2014 Challenge Cup champion and 2012 French national champion.

== Personal life ==
Bruno Massot was born on 28 January 1989 in Caen, France. On 15 April 2015, he announced his engagement to his longtime girlfriend, Sophie Levaufre. Their son, Louka, was born on 1 October 2018 in La Chaux-de-Fonds, Switzerland.

On 23 November 2017, the Deutsche Eislauf-Union announced that Massot would be sworn in as a German citizen in a week.

== Career ==
=== Early career ===
Massot began learning to skate in 1996. From the age of seven, he was coached by Jean-François Ballester. He competed in single skating through the 2006–07 season.

When he was 17 years old, Ballester convinced him to try pair skating. Massot teamed up with Camille Foucher, with whom he won a pair of senior bronze medals at the French Championships and competed at two World Junior Championships. After their partnership ended, he skated with Anne-Laure Letscher until February 2011.

Massot and Daria Popova decided to team up in March 2011 and began serious training in June.

=== 2011–2012 season ===
Popova/Massot trained mainly in Caen, France, with Jean-Francois Ballester. In their first season together, they also trained about three weeks every three months with Ingo Steuer in Chemnitz, Germany. Popova/Massot's first competition together was the 2011 Master's de Patinage, where they won the silver medal. They were tenth in their international debut at the 2011 Coupe de Nice and placed fourth at the 2011 NRW Trophy. In December 2011, they won the 2012 French national title ahead of Vanessa James / Morgan Cipres.

Visa and administrative delays led to uncertainty about their participation at the 2012 European Championships, but the situation was resolved just before the event. Popova/Massot placed sixth in the short program and eighth overall. They were not assigned to the 2012 World Championships, but were part of the French team for the World Team Trophy.

=== 2012–2013 season ===
Popova/Massot received two Grand Prix assignments — they placed fifth at the 2012 Skate Canada International and seventh at the 2012 Trophée Eric Bompard. They were second to James/Cipres at the French Championships and then placed seventh at the 2013 European Championships. At the 2013 World Championships, James/Cipres earned two spots for France in the pairs' event at the 2014 Winter Olympics in Sochi. As France's second-ranked pair, Popova/Massot were in line to receive the second Olympic spot if she received French citizenship in time.

=== 2013–2014 season ===
Popova had a problem with the sole of one of her boots at the start of the season. She and Massot placed eighth at their first Grand Prix assignment, the 2013 Cup of China. Popova then ceased training for six weeks due to a stress fracture in the third metatarsal bone of her left foot, causing the pair to withdraw from the 2013 Trophée Eric Bompard and French Championships.

Having resumed training in mid-December 2013, the pair elected to reduce the difficulty of some elements for the 2014 European Championships in January. They finished eleventh at Europeans in Budapest. On 21 January 2014, it was reported that Popova had not received French citizenship in time, and France's second spot would be transferred to Austria. Popova and Massot then went on to place fifteenth at the 2014 World Figure Skating Championships after placing fifteenth in both segments of the competition. It was their last competition together.

=== Teaming up with Savchenko and obtaining his release ===
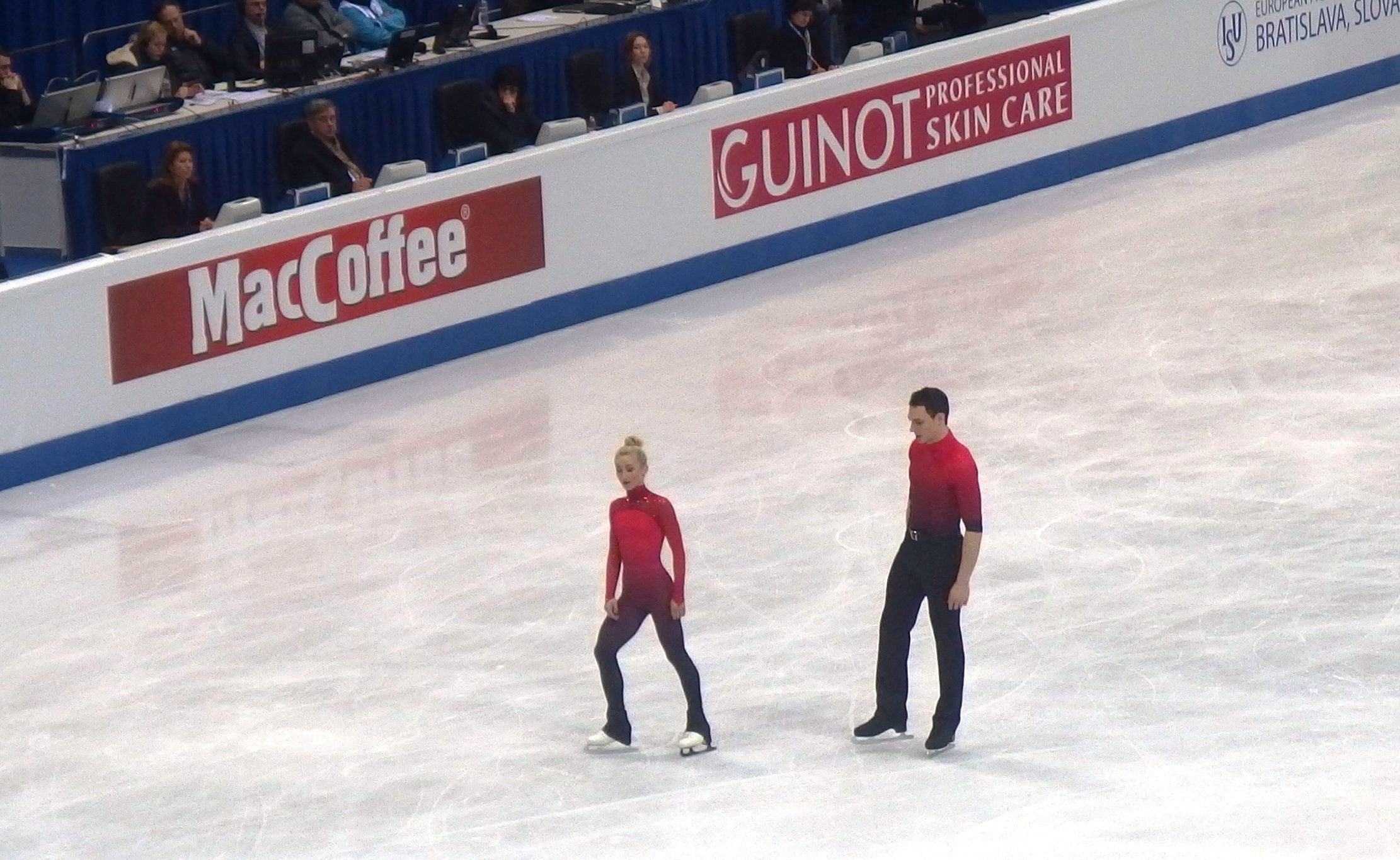
Savchenko and Massot at the 2016 Europeans

On 19 March 2014, Massot was reported to have teamed up with Aljona Savchenko of Germany. The two began training together in April, working to adjust to each other's different techniques. They made their first appearance as a pair at the 2014 All That Skate shows in South Korea. Because Chemnitz melted its ice rink until nearly the end of August, they trained in Coral Springs, Florida for two months beginning in mid-July.

Since the ISU does not allow any pairing to compete under two flags, one partner was obliged to change country and could not compete internationally until the previous country granted a release. In July 2014, Savchenko said that she preferred to continue competing for Germany while Massot preferred France. On 29 September 2014, the Deutsche Eislauf-Union announced that the pair had decided to skate for Germany. In October 2014, Savchenko/Massot started training in Oberstdorf, coached by Alexander König.

On 9 June 2015, Massot's mother announced that the Fédération Française des Sports de Glace (FFSG) had refused to release Massot to skate for Germany. He was not allowed to compete or perform in shows until the FFSG released him. Consequently, he lived on 200 euros a month for one and a half years. He considered living in his car, but the Deutsche Eislauf-Union stepped in with financial assistance to cover his rent, food, and training expenses, and to find some furniture. On 31 August 2015, the FFSG reportedly demanded a fee of €70,000 to release Massot, but later agreed to €30,000. He was released to skate for Germany on 26 October 2015.

=== 2015–2016 season ===
Savchenko/Massot made their debut at the 2015 CS Tallinn Trophy, an ISU Challenger Series (CS) event, where they won the gold medal. That was followed by gold at the 2015 CS Warsaw Cup and German Championships. In January, they won silver at the 2016 European Championships in Bratislava, Slovakia. It was Massot's first medal at an ISU Championship.

In April, they won the bronze medal at the 2016 World Championships in Boston, having placed fourth in the short program and third in the free skate.

=== 2016–2017 season ===
After taking gold at the 2016 CS Nebelhorn Trophy, Savchenko/Massot won both of their Grand Prix events, the 2016 Rostelecom Cup and 2016 Trophée de France. On 12 November, Savchenko tore a ligament in her right ankle on the landing of the throw triple Axel during the free skate in France. She decided to continue skating due to the possibility of a medal and being in a partnership, saying "If you were alone you might just throw in the towel, but there is that other half of the pair, who is also competing." She stated, "Luckily, the ligaments were not completely ruptured, but it takes eight to twelve weeks to heal." As a result, the pair withdrew from their December competitions, the Grand Prix Final and German Championships.

In January 2017, Savchenko/Massot won the silver medal, behind Russia's Evgenia Tarasova / Vladimir Morozov, at the 2017 European Championships in Ostrava, Czech Republic. In April, the pair received the silver medal, behind China's Sui Wenjing / Han Cong, at the 2017 World Championships in Helsinki, Finland.

=== 2017–2018 season ===
Savchenko/Massot began their season with silver at the 2017 CS Nebelhorn Trophy. Turning to the Grand Prix series, they took silver at the 2017 Skate Canada International after placing first in the short program and second in the free skate. Ranked third in the short and first in the free, the pair won gold at the 2017 Skate America. Their results qualified them to the Grand Prix Final in December, which they won.

In November 2017, Massot received German citizenship, allowing the pair to compete for Germany at the 2018 Winter Olympics.

Savchenko and Massot withdrew from the European Figure Skating Championships on 12 January, in order to focus their preparations for the Olympics.

After competing in the first part of the team event, Savchenko and Massot competed in the individual pairs event. They placed fourth in the short program after Massot doubled a jump. On 15 February 2018, Savchenko and Massot won the gold medal at the 2018 Winter Olympics, with a new world record score of 159.31 in the free skate.

Savchenko and Massot ended the season at the 2018 World Championships in Milan, Italy, where they won their first world title together. They set new personal bests in both the short and free programs, in the process setting new world records for the free skate and combined score. Massot commented, "It was exactly the season that we wanted. We started this season in September, and we said, 'we will give our best to win everything.' We didn’t go to Europeans in order to prepare for the Olympics. I think it was a good choice. We realized today that we reached our goal of the season today."

Following their World Championship victory, it was announced that the pair would take an indefinite break from competition.

=== Coaching career ===
In summer 2018, Massot began working as a coach in Caen, France. In 2025, he relocated to Angers.

His students have included:

- (Sweden) Greta Crafoord / John Crafoord
- (France) Camille Kovalev / Pavel Kovalev
- (France) Chloe Panetta / Flavien Giniaux
- (France) Oxana Vouillamoz / Flavien Giniaux
- (France) Megan Wessenberg / Denys Strekalin
- (Austria) Miriam Ziegler / Severin Kiefer

== Programs ==
=== With Savchenko ===
Season	Short program	Free skating	Exhibition
2017–2018	That Man by Caro Emerald; Ameksa – Fuego by Taalbi Brothers edited by Maxime Rodriguez choreo. by John Kerr	La terre vue du ciel by Armand Amar edited by Maxime Rodriguez choreo. by Christopher Dean	La terre vue du ciel by Armand Amar edited by Maxime Rodriguez choreo. by Christopher Dean; Up All Night by Oliver Tank
2016–2017	That Man by Caro Emerald	Lighthouse by Patrick Watson	Un Giorno Per Noi performed by Paul Potts; Medley by Wolfgang Amadeus Mozart; Nero by Two Steps from Hell; I Allegro by Sándor Végh; That Man by Caro Emerald
2015–2016	Créature de Siam (from Kurios) by Raphëal Beau, Guy Dubuc, Marc Lessard choreo. by Rostislav Sinicyn	Sometimes by Wax Tailor (from "Solveig's Song" by Edvard Grieg) choreo. by Gary Beacom	Time after Time by David Pfeffer

=== With Popova ===
Season	Short program	Free skating
2013–2014	Les Aristochats by C2C	Barry Lyndon
2012–2013	La Belle Histoire arranged by Gablé choreo. by Karine Arribert	Chocca; Far Away by Apocalyptica
2011–2012	La Belle Histoire arranged by Gablé choreo. by Karine Arribert	Broken Sorrow by Nuttin' but Stringz choreo. by Pierre-Loup Bouquet

=== With Foucher ===
Season	Short program	Free skating
2008–2009	Music by Gable	Sakountala by Pierre-Alexandre Mati
2007–2008	Libertango by Astor Piazzola	Sakountala by Pierre-Alexandre Mati

=== Single skating ===
Season	Short program	Free skating
2006–2007	Oriental by Maxime Rodriguez	Music by Thiersen, Guem, Encre, Shankar

== Competitive highlights ==
GP: Grand Prix; CS: Challenger Series; JGP: Junior Grand Prix

=== With Savchenko for Germany ===
International
Event	2015–16	2016–17	2017–18
Olympics			1st
World Champ.	3rd	2nd	1st
European Champ.	2nd	2nd	
GP Final		WD	1st
GP Rostelecom Cup		1st	
GP Skate Canada			2nd
GP Trophée de France		1st	
GP Skate America			1st
CS Nebelhorn Trophy		1st	2nd
CS Tallinn Trophy	1st		
CS Warsaw Cup	1st		
Bavarian Open	1st		
National
German Championships	1st	WD	1st
Team events
Olympics			7th T 3rd P
TBD = Assigned; WD = Withdrew

=== With Popova for France ===
International
Event	2011–12	2012–13	2013–14
World Champ.			15th
European Champ.	8th	7th	11th
GP Cup of China			8th
GP Skate Canada		5th	
GP Trophée Bompard		7th	WD
Challenge Cup		4th	1st
Cup of Nice	10th		
Nebelhorn Trophy		5th	
NRW Trophy	4th		
National
French Champ.	1st	2nd	
Masters	2nd	2nd	1st
Team events
World Team Trophy	4th T 6th P		
WD = Withdrew; T = Team result, P = Personal result

=== With Foucher and Letscher for France ===
International
Event	2007–08 (with Foucher)	2008–09 (with Foucher)	2009–10 (with Foucher)	2010–11 (with Letscher)
Junior Worlds	18th	14th		
JGP United Kingdom		11th		
National
French Champ.	3rd	3rd		3rd
Masters		3rd	1st J	3rd

=== Singles career for France ===
International
Event	2005–06	2006–07
JGP Hungary		14th
JGP Mexico		9th
Triglav Trophy	5th J	
National
French Championships		16th
J = Junior level

== Detailed results ==
Small medals for short and free programs awarded only at ISU Championships. At team events, medals are awarded for team results only.

=== With Savchenko ===
2017–18 season
Date	Event	SP	FS	Total
21–24 March 2018	2018 World Championships	1; 82.98	1; 162.86	1; 245.84
14–25 February 2018	2018 Winter Olympics	4; 76.59	1; 159.31	1; 235.90
9–12 February 2018	2018 Winter Olympics (Team event)	3; 75.36		7
14–16 December 2017	2018 German Championships	1; 76.29	1; 153.09	1; 229.38
7–10 December 2017	2017–18 Grand Prix Final	1; 79.43	1; 157.25	1; 236.68
24–26 November 2017	2017 Skate America	3; 72.55	1; 150.58	1; 223.13
27–29 October 2017	2017 Skate Canada International	1; 77.34	3; 138.32	2; 215.66
27–30 September 2017	2017 CS Nebelhorn Trophy	2; 72.99	2; 138.09	2; 211.08
2016–17 season
Date	Event	SP	FS	Total
29 March – 2 April 2017	2017 World Championships	2; 79.84	2; 150.46	2; 230.30
25–29 January 2017	2017 European Championships	3; 73.76	1; 148.59	2; 222.35
11–13 November 2016	2016 Trophée de France	1; 77.55	1; 133.04	1; 210.59
4–5 November 2016	2016 Rostelecom Cup	2; 69.51	1; 138.38	1; 207.89
22–24 September 2016	2016 CS Nebelhorn Trophy	1; 74.24	1; 128.80	1; 203.04
2015–16 season
Date	Event	SP	FS	Total
28 March – 3 April 2016	2016 World Championships	4; 74.22	3; 141.95	3; 216.17
25–31 January 2016	2016 European Championships	2; 75.54	3; 125.24	2; 200.78
11–13 December 2015	2016 German Championships	1; 80.61	1; 141.61	1; 222.22
27–29 November 2015	2015 CS Warsaw Cup	1; 76.30	1; 133.30	1; 209.60
18–22 November 2015	2015 CS Tallinn Trophy	1; 71.44	1; 142.98	1; 214.42
