= Laurine Lecavelier =

French figure skater

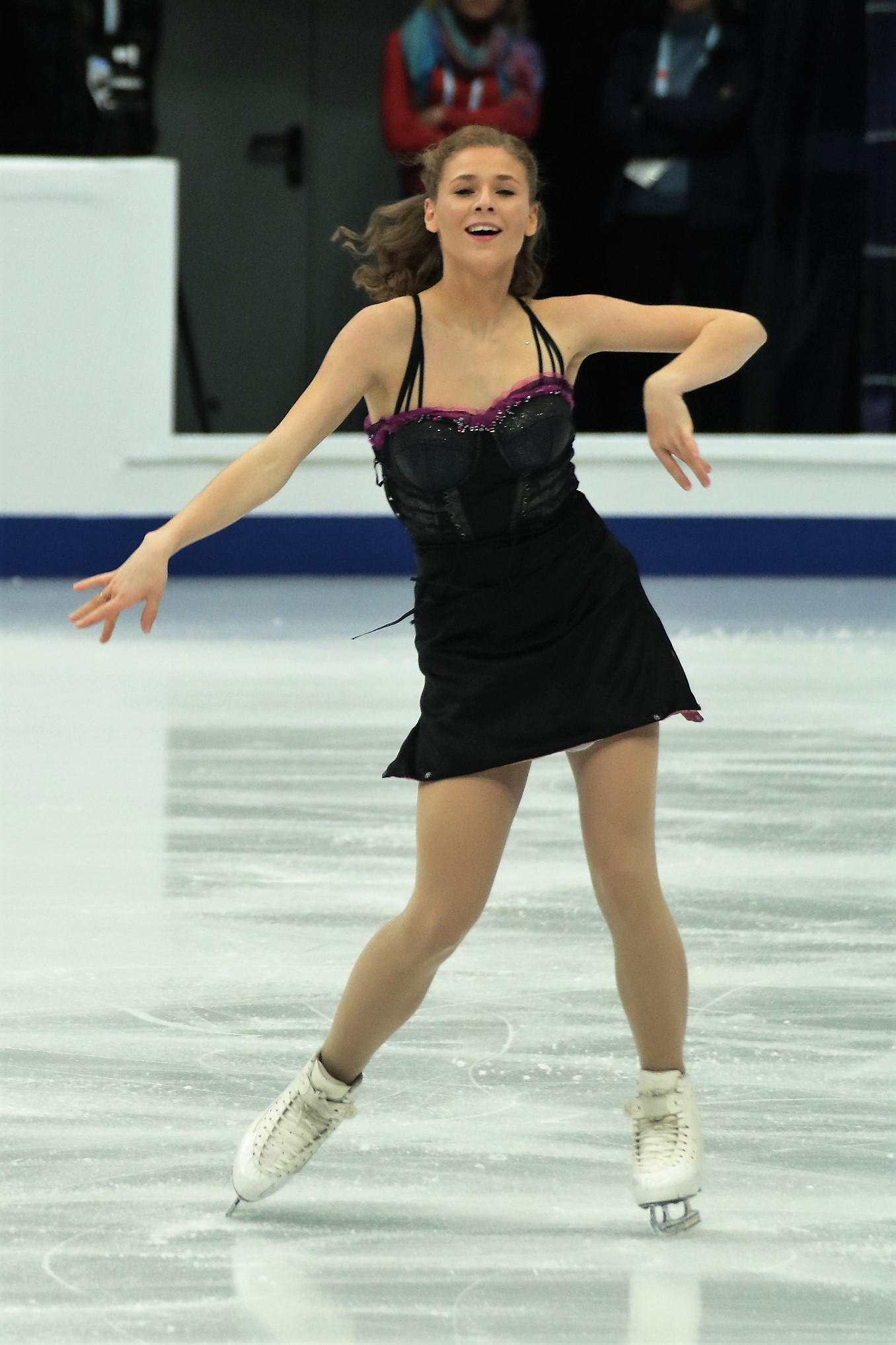
- Laurine Lecavelier at the 2018 European Championships

Personal information
- Born: 26 April 1996 (age 30) Enghien-les-Bains, France
- Home town: Vincennes, France
- Height: 1.62 m (5 ft 4 in)

Figure skating career
- Country: France
- Discipline: Women's singles
- Began skating: 2000
- Retired: 2019

Medal record
French Championships
Gold medal – first place	2017 Caen	Singles
Silver medal – second place	2014 Vaujany	Singles
Silver medal – second place	2015 Megève	Singles
Silver medal – second place	2016 Épinal	Singles
Silver medal – second place	2018 Nantes	Singles
Silver medal – second place	2019 Vaujany	Singles
Bronze medal – third place	2013 Strasbourg	Singles

Laurine Lecavelier (French pronunciation: [lo.ʁin lə.ka.və.lje]; born 26 April 1996) is a French former figure skater. She is a two-time Cup of Tyrol champion (2017, 2019), the 2017 Toruń Cup champion, the 2016 Golden Bear of Zagreb champion, and the 2017 French national champion. She has won a total of seven international events and finished within the top ten at four European Championships.

== Personal life ==
Lecavelier was born on 26 April 1996 in Enghien-les-Bains, France. She studied sociology.

== Career ==
=== Early years ===
Lecavelier began learning to skate in 2001. Her first coach was Katia Lemaire in Garges-lès-Gonesse.

She debuted on the ISU Junior Grand Prix series in 2011.

=== 2012–13 season ===
Lecavelier won her first senior national medal, bronze, at the 2013 French Championships and was sent to the 2013 World Junior Championships in Milan. She finished thirteenth after placing ninth in the short program and fifteenth in the free skate.

=== 2013–14 season ===
Lecavelier won silver at the French Championships and was selected to compete at the 2014 European Championships in Budapest. Ranked thirteenth in the short and eleventh in the free, she finished thirteenth overall.

=== 2014–15 season ===
Lecavelier made her Grand Prix debut, placing 11th at the 2014 Trophée Éric Bompard. After repeating as the national silver medalist, she finished tenth at the 2015 European Championships in Stockholm, having placed thirteenth in the short and tenth in the free. She was fourth at the 2015 Winter Universiade. She trained under Lemaire in Garges-lès-Gonesse until the end of the season.

=== 2015–16 season ===
During the 2015–16 season, Lecavelier was coached by Claude Thévenard at Pôle France in Bercy, Paris. She won a bronze medal at the 2015 International Cup of Nice. She placed twelfth in the short program at the 2015 Trophée Éric Bompard before the event was cancelled due to the November 2015 Paris attacks; the short program standings became the final results. Later that month, she was awarded gold at the NRW Trophy.

Ranked thirteenth in the short and ninth in the free, Lecavelier finished tenth overall at the 2016 European Championships in Bratislava, Slovakia. She then took silver at the Cup of Tyrol in Austria. Her short program placement, thirty-first, kept her out of the final segment at the 2016 World Championships in Boston, United States. Her season was hampered by a stress fracture in the pubic bone.

=== 2016–17 season ===
Around June 2016, Katia Gentelet began coaching Lecavelier at Nice Baie des Anges Association in Nice. Lecavelier won bronze at the International Cup of Nice and finished sixth at the Trophée de France, having ranked fourth in the short program and seventh in the free skate. In December, she took gold at the French Championships in Caen.

In January 2017, Lecavelier placed fifth overall (fifth in the short, fourth in the free) at the European Championships in Ostrava, achieving her career-best continental result. She finished the season at the 2017 World Championships in Helsinki, finishing eighteenth after making the free skate for the first time.

=== 2017–18 season ===
After the 2016–17 season, Lecavelier parted ways with coach Katia Gentelet before moving to Colorado Springs, Colorado to train with American coaches Kori Ade and Rohene Ward.

After a tenth-place finish at the 2017 CS Lombardia Trophy, Lecavelier competed on the Grand Prix series, and was assigned to two events for the first time. She finished eighth at the 2017 Skate Canada International, followed by an eleventh-place finish at the 2017 Internationaux de France.

At the 2017 French Figure Skating Championships, Lecavelier again finished second behind Maé-Bérénice Méité. At the 2018 European Championships she finished eleventh, while Méité was eighth. In consequence, Méité was assigned to France's lone ladies' entry at the 2018 Winter Olympics, while Lecavelier was sent to the 2018 World Championships in Milan, where she finished fourteenth.

=== 2018–19 season ===
Beginning on the Grand Prix series, Lecavelier finished fifth at the 2018 Skate America. She next competed at the Inge Solar Memorial, a Challenger event, again placing fifth. Finishing out the Grand Prix at the 2018 Internationaux de France, she placed ninth.

After winning another silver medal at the French Championships, she reprised her previous career best placement at the European Championships, finishing fifth. As a result, she was chosen over Méité to represent France at the 2019 World Championships in Saitama, where she placed fifteenth.

=== 2019–20 season ===
On September 28, 2019, Lecavelier competed at and won France's Master's de Patinage, but did not attend any additional events later in the season. In January 2020, it was reported by L'Équipe that Lecavelier had tested positive for cocaine at the Master's, and was facing a competition ban of up to four years.

== Programs ==
Season	Short program	Free skating	Exhibition
2019–2020	November by Max Richter choreo. by Massimo Scali	Waltz in C-sharp minor, Op. 64, No.2; Prelude, Op. 28, No. 4 by Frédéric Chopin choreo. by Massimo Scali	
2018–2019	Maktub 1 by Marcus Viana choreo. by Fabian Bourzat	I'll Take Care of You performed by Beth Hart, Joe Bonamassa choreo. by Karen Kwan-Oppergard	Rise Up by Andra Day
2017–2018	Summer of '42 by Michel Legrand choreo. by Rohene Ward; Shining Silver Skies by Ashram	Grease; Hopelessly Devoted to You; You're the One That I Want by John Farrar performed by Olivia Newton-John choreo. by Fabian Bourzat; Bye Bye Baby; My Heart Belongs to Daddy performed by Marilyn Monroe choreo. by Fabian Bourzat	Grease; Hopelessly Devoted to You; You're the One That I Want by John Farrar performed by Olivia Newton-John choreo. by Fabian Bourzat
2016–2017	Experience by Ludovico Einaudi choreo. by Fabian Bourzat	Grease; Hopelessly Devoted to You; You're the One That I Want by John Farrar performed by Olivia Newton-John choreo. by Fabian Bourzat	You Lost Me by Christina Aguilera
2015–2016	I Know You (from Fifty Shades of Grey)	Perfidia (from Shall We Dance?); Mujer Latina; Bésame Mucho; Mambo Swing by Big Bad Voodoo Daddy	Chandelier by Sia
2014–2015	Carmen by Lana Del Rey	Marimuz; Love Dance; Marimuz	
2013–2014	Carmen by Lana Del Rey	A Chorus Line by Marvin Hamlisch; Victor/Victoria by Henry Mancini	
2012–2013	Sing, Sing, Sing by Benny Goodman	A Chorus Line by Marvin Hamlisch; Victor/Victoria by Henry Mancini	
2011–2012	Assassin's Tango (from Mr. & Mrs. Smith) by John Powell	Sing, Sing, Sing by Louis Prima	

== Competitive highlights ==
GP: Grand Prix; CS: Challenger Series; JGP: Junior Grand Prix

International
Event	09–10	10–11	11–12	12–13	13–14	14–15	15–16	16–17	17–18	18–19	19–20
Worlds							31st	18th	14th	15th	
Europeans					13th	10th	10th	5th	11th	5th	
GP France						11th	12th	6th	11th	9th	WD
GP Skate America										5th	
GP Skate Canada									8th		
CS Alpen Trophy										5th	
CS Lombardia						7th			10th		
Coupe Printemps									4th		
Crystal Skate					1st						
Cup of Nice						5th	3rd	3rd			
Cup of Tyrol							2nd	1st		1st	
Gardena Trophy					4th						
Golden Bear								1st			
Hellmut Seibt						3rd					
Mladost Trophy				1st							
NRW Trophy							1st				
Toruń Cup								1st			
Universiade						4th					
International: Junior
Junior Worlds				13th							
JGP Belarus					9th						
JGP Estonia			10th								
JGP France				12th							
JGP Italy			12th								
JGP Latvia					11th						
JGP Slovenia				9th							
Bavarian Open				1st							
Cup of Nice				2nd							
Triglav Trophy		1st									
National
French Champ.	10th	12th	6th	3rd	2nd	2nd	2nd	1st	2nd	2nd	
Master's				1st J	1st J	2nd	1st	2nd	2nd	1st	1st
Team events
World Team; Trophy								6th T 11th P		4th T 10th P	
J = Junior level; TBD = Assigned; WD = Withdrew; T = Team result; P = Personal result. Medals awarded for team result only.

== Detailed results ==
Personal best highlighted in bold.

**2018–19 season**
Date	Event	SP	FS	Total
11–14 April 2019	2019 World Team Trophy	8; 62.53	9; 107.71	4T/10P; 170.24
18–24 March 2019	2019 World Championships	19; 56.81	15; 113.78	14; 170.59
25 February – 3 March 2019	2019 Cup of Tyrol	5; 52.09	1; 109.37	1; 161.46
21–27 January 2019	2019 European Championships	6; **63.29**	6; **116.76**	5; **180.05**
13–15 December 2018	2018 French Figure Skating Championships	2; 60.24	2; 117.30	2; 177.54
23–25 November 2018	2018 Internationaux de France	11; 51.66	9; 105.58	9; 157.24
11–18 November 2018	2018 CS Inge Solar Memorial – Alpen Trophy	5; 56.12	4; 106.66	5; 162.78
19–21 October 2018	2018 Skate America	7; 59.57	5; 112.84	5; 172.41
**2017–18 season**
19–25 March 2018	2018 World Championships	15; 59.79	13; 113.44	14; 173.23
16–18 March 2018	2018 Coupe du Printemps	4; 61.86	4; 101.80	4; 163.66
15–21 January 2018	2018 European Championships	7; 55.36	12; 98.75	11; 154.11
14–16 December 2017	2017 French Figure Skating Championships	2; 63.12	3; 114.92	2; 178.04
17–19 November 2017	2017 Internationaux de France	7; 60.68	11; 93.67	11; 154.35
27–29 October 2017	2017 Skate Canada International	8; 59.08	8; 107.35	8; 166.43
13–16 September 2017	2017 CS Lombardia Trophy	10; 53.97	9; 95.05	10; 149.02
**2016–17 season**
20–23 April 2017	2017 World Team Trophy	11; 54.15	10; 107.43	11; 161.58
27 March — 1 April 2017	2017 World Championships	22; 55.49	17; 107.50	18; 162.99
28 February – 5 March 2017	2017 Cup of Tyrol	3; 52.86	1; 108.55	1; 161.41
25–29 January 2017	2017 European Championships	5; 63.81	4; **124.29**	5; **188.10**
10–15 January 2017	2017 Toruń Cup	8; 50.44	1; 107.50	1; 157.94
15–17 December 2016	2016 French Figure Skating Championships	1; 62.06	1; 108.49	1; 170.55
7–10 December 2016	2016 CS Golden Spin of Zagreb	11; 49.16	6; 102.42	9; 151.58
10–12 November 2016	2016 Trophée de France	4; **66.61**	7; 118.04	6; 184.65
