= Daria Popova =

Russian former competitive pair skater (born 1993)

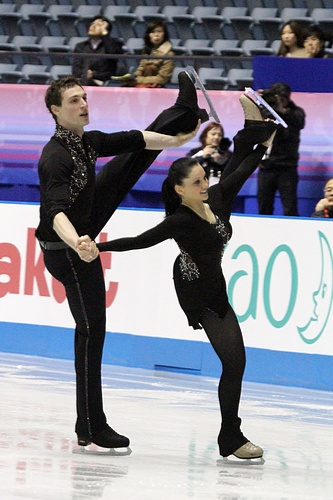
- Popova and Massot at the 2012 World Team Trophy

Personal information
- Born: 28 July 1993 (age 32) Moscow, Russia
- Height: 1.53 m (5 ft 0 in)

Figure skating career
- Country: France
- Began skating: 1999
- Retired: July 31, 2015

Daria Popova (born 28 July 1993) is a Russian former competitive pair skater. From 2011 to 2014, she competed with Bruno Massot, winning the 2014 Challenge Cup and the 2012 French national title. The pair finished in the top ten at the 2012 and 2013 European Championships. Popova also briefly skated for France with Andrei Novoselov.

== Personal life ==
Popova and her family moved to Germany when she was seven. She speaks German, Russian, English, and French.

== Career ==
=== Early years ===
Popova began skating in Moscow. She was initially a singles skater and competed on the Nachwuchs and Jugend levels in Germany in 2006 and 2007. She took up pair skating in 2009 and trained with coach Ingo Steuer in Germany. She skated with Ilja Glebov and Sergei Karev but did not compete with either in any major event.

=== Partnership with Massot ===
Popova and French skater Bruno Massot decided to team up in March 2011 and began serious training in June. They trained mainly in Caen, France, with Jean-Francois Ballester. In their first season together, they also trained about three weeks every three months with Ingo Steuer in Chemnitz, Germany.

Popova/Massot's first competition together was the 2011 Master's de Patinage, where they won the silver medal. They were tenth in their international debut at the 2011 Coupe de Nice and placed fourth at the 2011 NRW Trophy. In December 2011, they won the 2012 French national title ahead of Vanessa James / Morgan Cipres. Visa and administrative delays led to uncertainty about their participation at the 2012 European Championships but the situation was resolved just before the event. Popova/Massot placed sixth in the short program and eighth overall. They were not assigned to the 2012 World Championships, but were part of the French team for the World Team Trophy.

In the 2012–13 season, Popova/Massot received two Grand Prix assignments — they placed fifth at the 2012 Skate Canada International and seventh at the 2012 Trophée Eric Bompard. They were second to James/Cipres at the French Championships and then placed seventh at the 2013 European Championships. At the 2013 World Championships, James/Cipres earned two spots for France in the pairs' event at the 2014 Winter Olympics in Sochi. As France's second-ranked pair, Popova/Massot were in line to receive the second Olympic spot if she received French nationality in time.

In 2013–14, Popova had a problem with the sole of one of her boots at the start of the season. She and Massot placed eighth at their first Grand Prix assignment, the 2013 Cup of China. Popova then ceased training for six weeks due to a stress fracture in the third metatarsal bone of her left foot, causing the pair to withdraw from the 2013 Trophée Eric Bompard and French Championships. Having resumed training in mid-December 2013, the pair elected to reduce the difficulty of some elements for the 2014 European Championships in January. They finished 11th at Europeans in Budapest. On 21 January 2014, it was reported that Popova had not received French nationality in time and France's second spot would be transferred to Austria. Popova/Massot finished 15th at the 2014 World Championships after placing 15th in both segments of the competition. After the competition, Massot left their partnership to skate with Aliona Savchenko.

=== Partnership with Novoselov ===
After spending a week in mid-May 2014 helping Brian Joubert learn pair skating in Caen, Popova flew to Moscow in search of a new partner. On July 16, 2014, she announced she would skate for France with Andrei Novoselov and said they planned to divide their training between Moscow, coached by Inna Utkina, and Paris, coached by Claude Péri. However, Popova decided to retire from competitive figure skating on July 31, 2015.

== Programs ==
(with Massot)

Season	Short program	Free skating	Exhibition
2013–2014	Les Aristochats by C2C	Barry Lyndon	
2012–2013	La Belle Histoire arranged by Gablé choreo. by Karine Arribert	Chocca; Far Away by Apocalyptica	
2011–2012	La Belle Histoire arranged by Gablé choreo. by Karine Arribert	Broken Sorrow by Nuttin' but Stringz choreo. by Pierre-Loup Bouquet	

== Competitive highlights ==
=== With Novoselov for France ===
International
Event	2014–15
International Challenge Cup	6th
National
French Championships	2nd
Master's de Patinage	2nd

=== With Massot for France ===
International
Event	2011–12	2012–13	2013–14
World Champ.			15th
European Champ.	8th	7th	11th
GP Cup of China			8th
GP Skate Canada		5th	
GP Trophée Bompard		7th	WD
Challenge Cup		4th	1st
Cup of Nice	10th		
Nebelhorn Trophy		5th	
NRW Trophy	4th		
National
French Champ.	1st	2nd	
Masters	2nd	2nd	1st
Team events
World Team Trophy	4th T 6th P		
GP = Grand Prix; WD = Withdrew; T = Team result; P = Personal result
