= Chafik Besseghier =

French figure skater

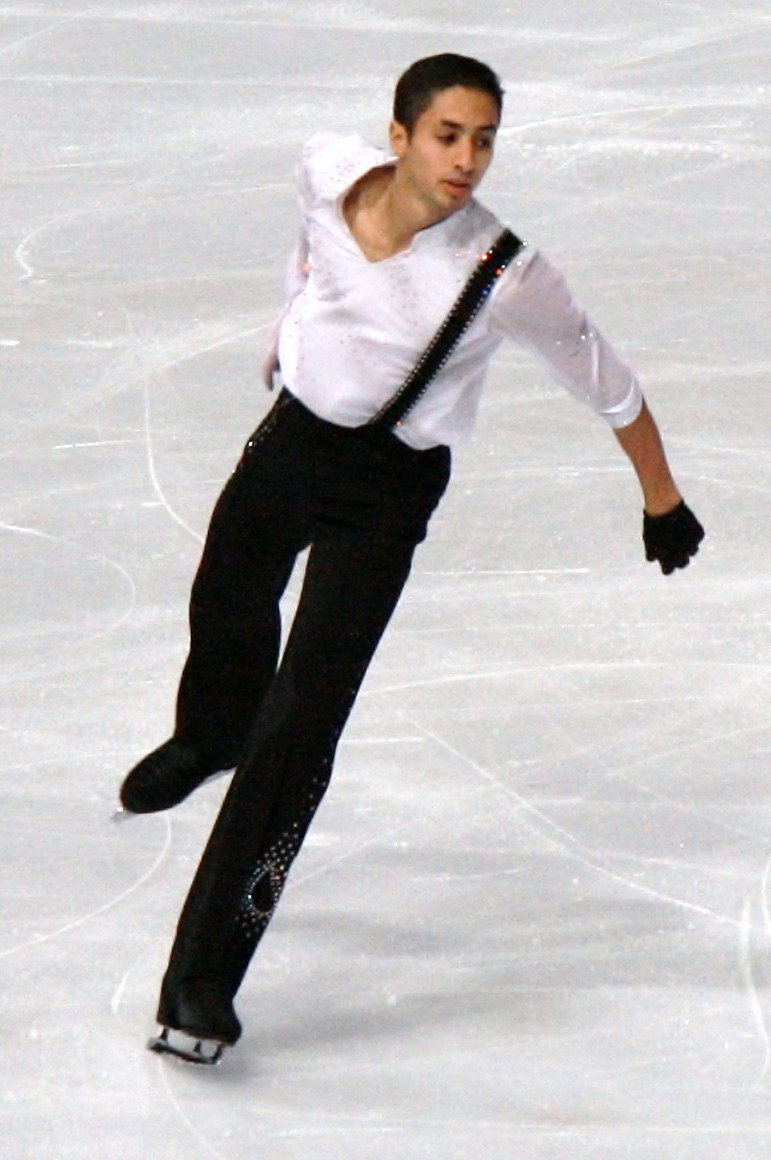
- Chafik Besseghier at the 2011 Trophée Éric Bompard

Personal information
- Born: 11 October 1989 (age 36) Grenoble, France
- Home town: Paris, France
- Height: 1.71 m (5 ft 7 in)

Figure skating career
- Country: France
- Discipline: Men's singles
- Began skating: 2002

Medal record
French Championships
| Gold medal – first place | 2016 Épinal | Singles |
| Gold medal – first place | 2018 Nantes | Singles |
| Silver medal – second place | 2013 Strasbourg | Singles |
| Silver medal – second place | 2017 Caen | Singles |
| Bronze medal – third place | 2012 Dammarie-lès-Lys | Singles |
| Bronze medal – third place | 2014 Vaujany | Singles |
| Bronze medal – third place | 2015 Megève | Singles |

Chafik Besseghier (born 11 October 1989) is a French figure skater. He is a two-time International Cup of Nice champion and the 2016 and 2018 French national champion. He has won a total of fourteen senior international medals and finished in the top ten at three ISU Championships (2014 Worlds, 2013 Europeans, 2017 Europeans).

== Personal life ==
Chafik Besseghier was born in Grenoble, France. His parents are from Algeria, close to Oran, and he has two siblings.

On 14 February 2020, Besseghier married Ukrainian-Turkish ice dancer Alisa Agafonova.

== Career ==
=== Early years ===
Besseghier began skating at a relatively late age, almost 13, in August 2002. Within a year, he had landed all the double jumps, and was landing triples by the end of his second year. Training in Grenoble, he competed mostly domestically before making his ISU Junior Grand Prix debut in 2008.

In the 2009–2010 season, Besseghier won the bronze medal at the Crystal Skate of Romania and 2010 Triglav Trophy.

=== 2010–2011 season ===
In 2010, he was invited to his first senior Grand Prix event, the 2010 Trophée Éric Bompard. After landing his first quadruple-triple jump combination in the short program, he was in fourth place, with the second-highest technical score. He made several mistakes in the free skate and placed fifth overall.

=== 2011–2012 season ===
Prior to the 2011–2012 season, Besseghier spent several months working with Yuka Sato and Jason Dungjen at the Detroit Skating Club in Bloomfield Hills, Michigan. He was the silver medalist at the 2011 Coupe de Nice, where he won the free skate. Besseghier again competed at the Trophée Éric Bompard, coming in ninth. Competing with tendinitis in his knee, he won the bronze medal at the 2012 French Championships and placed 12th in his European Championship debut. At the end of the season, he moved from Grenoble to Paris.

=== 2012–2013 season ===
Besseghier was awarded a silver medal at the 2013 French Championships and placed ninth at the 2013 European Championships.

=== 2013–2014 season ===
Besseghier injured his ankle in October 2013 at the Master's de Patinage. He withdrew from his two Grand Prix assignments, the 2013 NHK Trophy and 2013 Trophée Éric Bompard. Besseghier placed 12th at the 2014 European Championships in Budapest. After scoring well at the International Challenge Cup, he was selected for his first World Championships. Setting personal best scores in both programs, he finished ninth overall at the event in Saitama, Japan.

=== 2014–2015 season ===
Besseghier was selected to compete at two Grand Prix events, the 2014 Skate America and 2014 Trophée Éric Bompard. He finished 7th and 9th at the two events, respectively. He withdrew from the 2015 Europeans and placed 18th at the 2015 Worlds.

=== 2015–2016 season ===
In late August 2015, Besseghier began visiting Russian coach Elena Buianova in Moscow, although Annick Dumont remained his main coach. He began the 2015–16 season by winning gold at the Lombardia Trophy and International Cup of Nice, before winning the French national title in December.

Besseghier withdrew from the 2016 European Championships after rupturing a ligament in his right ankle. He placed 20th at the 2016 World Championships in Boston. He trained under Dumont in Champigny-sur-Marne until the end of the season.

=== 2016–2017 season ===
Besseghier changed coaches ahead of the 2016–2017 season, deciding to rejoin Stanick Jeannette in Grenoble. He placed 9th at the 2017 European Championships in Ostrava, Czech Republic, and 17th at the 2017 World Championships in Helsinki, Finland. Due to his world result, France qualified a spot in the men's event at the 2018 Winter Olympics in Pyeongchang, South Korea.

=== 2017–2018 season ===
Besseghier was hospitalised from 29 September to 2 October due to a pneumothorax involving detachment of the pleura. He withdrew from his Grand Prix assignments.

== Programs ==
| Season | Short program | Free skating | Exhibition |
|---|---|---|---|
| 2017–2018 | Sugarhill Gang - Remix; Down The Road by C2C - Remix by Maxime Rodriguez | The Godfather by Nino Rota remix by Maxime Rodriguez | |
| 2016–2017 | It's a Man's Man's Man's World performed by Seal | 300 BOF by audiomachine; Tears of the Sun by Hans Zimmer; Aeternae by Globus | Aladdin (soundtrack); Yeah 3x by Chris Brown |
| 2015–2016 | Una mattina by Ludovico Einaudi; Black Mozart Intro by Ryan Leslie choreo. by Fabian Bourzat | Reborn - Renaissance by Era; Les Mille et une Nuit by Alf choreo. by Laurie May | |
| 2014–2015 | Heat; Mountain Legends by Clozee | Road Game by Kavinsky; You and Me by Disclosure ft. Eliza Doolittle | |
| 2013–2014 | Heat; Mountain Legends by Clozee choreo. by Allen Schramm, Stanick Jeannette | Passion (from The Last Temptation of Christ) by Peter Gabriel; Egyptian Disco by DJ Disse; Reborn by Era; Passion by Peter Gabriel choreo. by Allen Schramm, Stanick Jeannette | |
| 2012–2013 | Piano in Concerto by Maksim Mrvica | Freestyler by Boom Funk; Paris – Texas; Nuttin' But Stringz | |
| 2011–2012 | Piano in Concerto by Maksim Mrvica | Teardrop by Massive Attack; Children by Robert Miles; Safri Duo | L'assasymphonie (from Mozart, l'opéra rock) by Florent Mothe |
| 2010–2011 | Artsakh by Ara Gevorgyan | Les Temps des Gitans by Goran Bregović; Tarantella; Korobushko by Bond | Hallelujah by Grégory Morant; Tarantella; Korobushko by Bond |

== Competitive highlights ==
GP: Grand Prix; CS: Challenger Series; JGP: Junior Grand Prix

International
| Event | 06–07 | 07–08 | 08–09 | 09–10 | 10–11 | 11–12 | 12–13 | 13–14 | 14–15 | 15–16 | 16–17 | 17–18 |
|---|---|---|---|---|---|---|---|---|---|---|---|---|
| Olympics | | | | | | | | | | | | 26th |
| Worlds | | | | | | | | 9th | 18th | 20th | 17th | |
| Europeans | | | | | | 12th | 9th | 12th | WD | WD | 9th | 11th |
| GP NHK Trophy | | | | | | | | WD | | 9th | | |
| GP Rostelecom | | | | | | | | | | | 8th | |
| GP Skate America | | | | | | | | | 7th | | | |
| GP Trophée Bompard | | | | | 5th | 9th | 7th | WD | 9th | 10th | 8th | WD |
| GP Skate Canada | | | | | | | | | | | | WD |
| CS Ondrej Nepela | | | | | | | | | | | | 7th |
| Challenge Cup | | | | | | | 3rd | 3rd | | | | |
| Crystal Skate | | | | 3rd | 1st | 1st | | | | | | |
| Cup of Nice | | | | 5th | 6th | 2nd | 9th | | | 1st | 1st | |
| Cup of Tyrol | | | | | | | | | | 1st | | 3rd |
| DS Cup | | | | | | | | 2nd | | | | |
| FBMA Trophy | | | | | | | | | | | 1st | |
| Ice Challenge | | | | 4th | | | | | | | | |
| Lombardia | | | | | | | | | | 1st | | |
| Mont Blanc | | | | 3rd | | | | | | | | |
| Nepela Trophy | | | | | | 11th | | | | | | |
| Nordics | | | | | | | | | | | 1st | |
| NRW Trophy | | | | | | | 4th | | | | | |
| Toruń Cup | | | | | | | | | 2nd | | | |
| Triglav Trophy | | | | 3rd | 6th | | | | | | | |
| Universiade | | | | | 5th | | | | | | | |
International: Junior
| JGP Spain | | | 6th | | | | | | | | | |
| Cup of Nice | | 6th J | 3rd J | | | | | | | | | |
| Gardena | | | 7th J | | | | | | | | | |
National
| French Champ. | 17th | 12th | 9th | 5th | 4th | 3rd | 2nd | 3rd | 3rd | 1st | 2nd | 1st |
| Masters | | | 4th J | 5th | 4th | 3rd | 3rd | WD | 1st | WD | 1st | WD |
Team events
| Olympics | | | | | | | | | | | | 10th T |
| World Team; Trophy | | | | | | | | | | | 6th T 8th P | |
