= 2016–17 ISU Grand Prix of Figure Skating =

- Type: Grand Prix
- Date: October 21 – December 11, 2016
- Season: 2016–17
- Previous: 2015–16 Grand Prix
- Next: 2017–18 Grand Prix

The 2016–17 ISU Grand Prix of Figure Skating was a series of invitational senior internationals which ran from October through December 2016. Medals were awarded in the disciplines of men's singles, ladies' singles, pair skating, and ice dancing. Skaters earned points based on their placement at each event and the top six in each discipline qualified to compete at the Grand Prix Final in Marseille.

Organized by the International Skating Union, the series set the stage for the 2017 Europeans, the 2017 Four Continents, and the 2017 World Championships. The corresponding series for junior-level skaters was the 2016–17 ISU Junior Grand Prix.

== Schedule ==
The series was composed of the following events:

Date	Event	Location
October 21–23	2016 Skate America	Chicago, Illinois, United States
October 28–30	2016 Skate Canada International	Mississauga, Ontario, Canada
November 4–6	2016 Rostelecom Cup	Moscow, Russia
November 11–13	2016 Trophée de France	Paris, France
November 18–20	2016 Cup of China	Beijing, China
November 25–27	2016 NHK Trophy	Sapporo, Japan
December 8–11	2016–17 Grand Prix Final	Marseille, France

== Requirements ==
Skaters were eligible to compete on the senior Grand Prix circuit if they had reached the age of 15 before July 1, 2016. They were also required to have earned either a minimum total score or minimum technical elements scores (TES) at certain international events:

Discipline	Total score	Short segment TES	Free segment TES
Men	188.95	36.91	70.83
Ladies	134.31	24.31	46.66
Pairs	139.19	26.33	47.68
Ice dance	116.67	23.08	35.63
Total scores: ISU Championships, Grand Prix; Challenger Series, Junior Grand Prix in the 2015–16 season. TES: ISU Events or selected international competitions in the 2015–16 or 2016–17 season

== Assignments ==
The ISU published the preliminary Grand Prix assignments on June 30, 2016.

=== Men ===
Skater	Assignment(s)
(Australia) Brendan Kerry	Skate America, Trophée de France (added)
(Belgium) Jorik Hendrickx	Skate America, Trophée de France (added)
(Canada) Elladj Baldé	Rostelecom Cup, NHK Trophy
(Canada) Patrick Chan	Skate Canada International, Cup of China
(Canada) Nam Nguyen	Skate America, NHK Trophy
(China) Jin Boyang	Skate America, Cup of China
(China) Yan Han	Skate Canada International, Cup of China
(Czech Republic) Michal Březina	Skate Canada International, Cup of China
(France) Chafik Besseghier	Rostelecom Cup, Trophée de France
(Israel) Alexei Bychenko	Rostelecom Cup, NHK Trophy
(Israel) Daniel Samohin	Skate Canada International, Cup of China
(Japan) Yuzuru Hanyu	Skate Canada International, NHK Trophy
(Japan) Takahito Mura	Skate Canada International, Trophée de France
(Japan) Keiji Tanaka	Rostelecom Cup, NHK Trophy
(Japan) Shoma Uno	Skate America, Rostelecom Cup
(Latvia) Deniss Vasiļjevs	Rostelecom Cup, NHK Trophy (added)
(Russia) Artur Dmitriev Jr.	Rostelecom Cup, Trophée de France
(Russia) Mikhail Kolyada	Rostelecom Cup, NHK Trophy
(Russia) Maxim Kovtun	Skate America, Cup of China
(Russia) Alexander Petrov	Skate Canada International, Cup of China
(Russia) Sergei Voronov	Skate America, Cup of China
(Spain) Javier Fernández	Rostelecom Cup, Trophée de France
(United States) Max Aaron	Rostelecom Cup, Cup of China
(United States) Jason Brown	Skate America, NHK Trophy
(United States) Nathan Chen	Trophée de France, NHK Trophy
(United States) Grant Hochstein	Skate Canada International, NHK Trophy
(United States) Ross Miner	Skate Canada International, Cup of China
(United States) Adam Rippon	Skate America, Trophée de France
(Uzbekistan) Misha Ge	Skate Canada International, Trophée de France
1 assignment
(Canada) Liam Firus	Skate Canada International
(Canada) Kevin Reynolds	Skate Canada International
(Italy) Ivan Righini	Trophée de France, ~~NHK Trophy~~
(Japan) Ryuju Hino	NHK Trophy (added)
(Kazakhstan) Denis Ten	~~Skate America~~, Trophée de France
(Russia) Gordei Gorshkov	Rostelecom Cup
(Sweden) Alexander Majorov	Rostelecom Cup
(United States) Timothy Dolensky	Skate America

=== Ladies ===
Skater	Assignment(s)
(Armenia) Anastasia Galustyan	Rostelecom Cup (added), Trophée de France (added)
(Canada) Alaine Chartrand	Skate Canada International, NHK Trophy
(Canada) Gabrielle Daleman	Skate America, Trophée de France
(Canada) Kaetlyn Osmond	Skate Canada International, Cup of China
(China) Li Zijun	Rostelecom Cup, Cup of China
(Italy) Roberta Rodeghiero	Skate America, Rostelecom Cup
(Japan) Mao Asada	Skate America, Trophée de France
(Japan) Wakaba Higuchi	Trophée de France, NHK Trophy
(Japan) Rika Hongo	Skate Canada International, Cup of China
(Japan) Yura Matsuda	Rostelecom Cup, NHK Trophy
(Japan) Mai Mihara	Skate America, Cup of China
(Japan) Satoko Miyahara	Skate Canada International, NHK Trophy
(Japan) Kanako Murakami	Skate America, Rostelecom Cup
(Japan) Yuka Nagai	Skate Canada International, Trophée de France
(Kazakhstan) Elizabet Tursynbayeva	Rostelecom Cup, NHK Trophy
(South Korea) Choi Da-bin	Skate Canada International, NHK Trophy (added)
(South Korea) Park So-youn	Skate America, Trophée de France
(Latvia) Angelīna Kučvaļska	Skate America, Rostelecom Cup
(Russia) Evgenia Medvedeva	Skate Canada International, Trophée de France
(Russia) Anna Pogorilaya	Rostelecom Cup, NHK Trophy
(Russia) Elena Radionova	Rostelecom Cup, Cup of China
(Russia) Maria Sotskova	Trophée de France, NHK Trophy
(Russia) Elizaveta Tuktamysheva	Skate Canada International, Cup of China
(Slovakia) Nicole Rajičová	Rostelecom Cup, NHK Trophy
(Sweden) Joshi Helgesson	Skate Canada International, Cup of China
(United States) Karen Chen	Cup of China, NHK Trophy
(United States) Gracie Gold	Skate America, Trophée de France
(United States) Courtney Hicks	Rostelecom Cup, Cup of China
(United States) Mirai Nagasu	Skate Canada International, NHK Trophy
(United States) Ashley Wagner	Skate America, Cup of China
1 assignment
(China) Li Xiangning	Cup of China
(China) Zhao Ziquan	Cup of China
(France) Laurine Lecavelier	Trophée de France
(France) Maé-Bérénice Méité	Trophée de France
(South Korea) Kim Na-hyun	Skate Canada International (added)
(Russia) Alena Leonova	Trophée de France, ~~NHK Trophy~~
(Russia) Yulia Lipnitskaya	~~Skate America~~, Rostelecom Cup
(Russia) Serafima Sakhanovich	Skate America
(United States) Mariah Bell	Skate America (added)

=== Pairs ===
Pair	Assignment(s)
(Austria) Miriam Ziegler / Severin Kiefer	Trophée de France, NHK Trophy
(Canada) Meagan Duhamel / Eric Radford	Skate Canada International, NHK Trophy
(Canada) Liubov Ilyushechkina / Dylan Moscovitch	Skate Canada International, Cup of China
(Canada) Julianne Séguin / Charlie Bilodeau	Skate America, Rostelecom Cup
(China) Peng Cheng / Jin Yang	Cup of China, NHK Trophy
(China) Wang Xuehan / Wang Lei	Cup of China (added), NHK Trophy
(China) Yu Xiaoyu / Zhang Hao	Skate Canada International, Cup of China
(France) Vanessa James / Morgan Ciprès	Skate America, Trophée de France
(Germany) Aliona Savchenko / Bruno Massot	Rostelecom Cup, Trophée de France
(Germany) Mari Vartmann / Ruben Blommaert	Cup of China, NHK Trophy (added)
(Italy) Nicole Della Monica / Matteo Guarise	Skate Canada International, Cup of China
(Italy) Valentina Marchei / Ondřej Hotárek	Skate America (added), Rostelecom Cup
(Russia) Kristina Astakhova / Alexei Rogonov	Skate America, Rostelecom Cup
(Russia) Yuko Kavaguti / Alexander Smirnov	Skate Canada International, Cup of China
(Russia) Evgenia Tarasova / Vladimir Morozov	Skate America, Trophée de France
(Russia) Natalia Zabiiako / Alexander Enbert	Rostelecom Cup, Trophée de France
(United States) Marissa Castelli / Mervin Tran	Skate America, Trophée de France
(United States) Haven Denney / Brandon Frazier	Skate America (added), Skate Canada International
(United States) Tarah Kayne / Daniel O'Shea	Skate America, NHK Trophy
1 assignment
(Canada) Brittany Jones / Joshua Reagan	Skate Canada International
(Canada) Camille Ruest / Andrew Wolfe	Rostelecom Cup (added)
(Japan) Sumire Suto / Francis Boudreau Audet	NHK Trophy
(Lithuania) Goda Butkutė / Nikita Ermolaev	Rostelecom Cup (added)
(Russia) Alisa Efimova / Alexander Korovin	Rostelecom Cup (added)
(United States) Jessica Pfund / Joshua Santillan	Cup of China (added)

=== Ice dance ===
Team	Assignment(s)
(Belarus) Viktoria Kavaliova / Yurii Bieliaiev	Rostelecom Cup, Trophée de France (added)
(Canada) Piper Gilles / Paul Poirier	Skate Canada International, Trophée de France
(Canada) Alexandra Paul / Mitchell Islam	Skate Canada International, Cup of China
(Canada) Tessa Virtue / Scott Moir	Skate Canada International, NHK Trophy
(Canada) Kaitlyn Weaver / Andrew Poje	Rostelecom Cup International, Cup of China
(China) Wang Shiyue / Liu Xinyu	Skate Canada International, Cup of China
(Denmark) Laurence Fournier Beaudry / Nikolaj Sørensen	Skate Canada International, Rostelecom Cup
(France) Marie-Jade Lauriault / Romain Le Gac	Trophée de France, NHK Trophy
(France) Gabriella Papadakis / Guillaume Cizeron	Trophée de France, NHK Trophy
(Israel) Isabella Tobias / Ilia Tkachenko	Skate America, Trophée de France
(Italy) Anna Cappellini / Luca Lanotte	Skate Canada International, NHK Trophy
(Italy) Charlène Guignard / Marco Fabbri	Skate America, Rostelecom Cup
(Japan) Kana Muramoto / Chris Reed	Skate America, NHK Trophy
(Poland) Natalia Kaliszek / Maksym Spodyriev	Cup of China, NHK Trophy
(Russia) Ekaterina Bobrova / Dmitri Soloviev	Skate America, Rostelecom Cup
(Russia) Elena Ilinykh / Ruslan Zhiganshin	Skate America, Trophée de France
(Russia) Victoria Sinitsina / Nikita Katsalapov	Cup of China, NHK Trophy
(Russia) Alexandra Stepanova / Ivan Bukin	Skate Canada International, Cup of China
(Turkey) Alisa Agafonova / Alper Uçar	Skate America, Rostelecom Cup
(United States) Anastasia Cannuscio / Colin McManus	Cup of China, NHK Trophy (added)
(United States) Madison Chock / Evan Bates	Skate Canada International, Rostelecom Cup
(United States) Kaitlin Hawayek / Jean-Luc Baker	Skate Canada International, NHK Trophy
(United States) Madison Hubbell / Zachary Donohue	Skate America, Trophée de France
(United States) Elliana Pogrebinsky / Alex Benoit	Skate America, Rostelecom Cup
(United States) Maia Shibutani / Alex Shibutani	Skate America, Cup of China
1 assignment
(China) Chen Hong / Zhao Yan	Cup of China
(China) Song Linshu / Sun Zhuoming	Cup of China (added)
(Czech Republic) Cortney Mansour / Michal Češka	Trophée de France (added)
(Finland) Cecilia Törn / Jussiville Partanen	Skate Canada International (added)
(France) Lorenza Alessandrini / Pierre Souquet	Trophée de France
(Japan) Emi Hirai / Marien de la Asuncion	NHK Trophy
(Russia) Sofia Evdokimova / Egor Bazin	Rostelecom Cup
(Russia) Tiffany Zahorski / Jonathan Guerreiro	Rostelecom Cup
(South Korea) Yura Min / Alexander Gamelin	Skate America (added)
(Ukraine) Oleksandra Nazarova / Maxim Nikitin	Trophée de France

=== Changes to preliminary assignments ===
==== Skate America ====
Date	Discipline	Withdrew	Added	Reason/Other notes	Refs
August 10	Pairs	(United States) Madeline Aaron / Max Settlage	(United States) Haven Denney / Brandon Frazier	Split	
August 16	Men	N/A	(United States) Timothy Dolensky	Host picks	
August 22	Ladies	N/A	(United States) Angela Wang	Host picks	
September 9	Ice dance	N/A	(United States) Elliana Pogrebinsky / Alex Benoit	Host picks	
September 14	Pairs	N/A	(United States) Marissa Castelli / Mervin Tran	Host picks	
September 22 and 23	Pairs	(China) Sui Wenjing / Han Cong	(Italy) Valentina Marchei / Ondřej Hotárek	Injury (Sui)	
September 22 and 23	Ice dance	(South Korea) Rebeka Kim / Kirill Minov	(South Korea) Yura Min / Alexander Gamelin		
October 12	Ladies	(United States) Angela Wang	(United States) Mariah Bell	Injury	
October 16	Men	(Kazakhstan) Denis Ten	Not replaced		
October 17	Ladies	(Russia) Yulia Lipnitskaya	Not replaced	Injury	
October 20	Men	(Japan) Daisuke Murakami	Not replaced	Injury	

==== Skate Canada International ====
Date	Discipline	Withdrew	Added	Reason/Other notes	Refs
July 7	Ice dancing	(Slovakia) Federica Testa / Lukáš Csölley	(Finland) Cecilia Törn / Jussiville Partanen	Split	
August 17	Men	N/A	(Canada) Kevin Reynolds	Host picks	
August 17	Ladies	N/A	(Canada) Véronik Mallet	Host picks	
August 17	Pairs	N/A	(Canada) Brittany Jones / Joshua Reagan	Host picks	
September 21 and 30	Ladies	(Russia) Maria Artemieva	(South Korea) Kim Na-hyun		
October 25	Pairs	(Russia) Vera Bazarova / Andrei Deputat	Not replaced	Injury	
October 25	Ladies	(Canada) Véronik Mallet	Not replaced	Injury	

==== Rostelecom Cup ====
Date	Discipline	Withdrew	Added	Reason/Other notes	Refs
September 15	Men	N/A	(Russia) Gordei Gorshkov	Host picks	
September 15	Ice dance	N/A	(Russia) Sofia Evdokimova / Egor Bazin	Host picks	
September 28 and 30	Pairs	(United States) Alexa Scimeca / Chris Knierim	(Lithuania) Goda Butkutė / Nikita Ermolaev	Illness (Scimeca)	
October 12 and 17	Ladies	(United States) Polina Edmunds	(Armenia) Anastasia Galustyan	Injury	
October 17	Pairs	(Canada) Kirsten Moore-Towers / Michael Marinaro	(Canada) Camille Ruest / Andrew Wolfe		
October 17 and 20	Pairs	(Russia) Ksenia Stolbova / Fedor Klimov	(Russia) Alisa Efimova / Alexander Korovin		

==== Trophée de France ====
Date	Discipline	Withdrew	Added	Reason/Other notes	Refs
July 7	Ice dancing	(Slovakia) Federica Testa / Lukáš Csölley	(Czech Republic) Cortney Mansour / Michal Češka	Split	
September 1 and 12	Ice dance	(United Kingdom) Penny Coomes / Nicholas Buckland	(Belarus) Viktoria Kavaliova / Yurii Bieliaiev	Injury (Coomes)	
September 13 and 21	Men	(Russia) Adian Pitkeev	(Belgium) Jorik Hendrickx	Injury	
October 12 and 17	Ladies	(United States) Tyler Pierce	(Armenia) Anastasia Galustyan	Injury	
October 24; November 1	Men	(France) Romain Ponsart	(Australia) Brendan Kerry		
October 24	Pairs	(France) Camille Mendoza / Pavel Kovalev	N/A		
October 27	Men	(Japan) Sota Yamamoto	N/A	Injury	
November 7	Pairs	(France) Lola Esbrat / Andrei Novoselov	N/A		

The French organisers decided not to replace Mendoza/Kovalev despite the ISU's rules stating that it is "mandatory" to invite another pair if one withdraws more than 14 days before the event. The pairs competition ended up with only six entries after a further withdrawal (Esbrat/Novoselov).

==== Cup of China ====
Date	Discipline	Withdrew	Added	Reason/Other notes	Refs
September 1	Men	N/A	(China) Zhang He	Host picks	
September 1	Ladies	N/A	(China) Li Xiangning	Host picks	
September 1	Ice dance	N/A	(China) Li Xibei / Xiang Guangyao	Host picks	
September 28 and 30	Pairs	(United States) Alexa Scimeca / Chris Knierim	(United States) Jessica Pfund / Joshua Santillan	Illness (Scimeca)	
October 17	Ice dance	(China) Li Xibei / Xiang Guangyao	(China) Song Linshu / Sun Zhuoming		
October 17	Pairs	(China) Sui Wenjing / Han Cong	(China) Wang Xuehan / Wang Lei	Injury (Sui)	
October 27; November 9	Men	(China) Zhang He	N/A		
November 9	Men	(Japan) Daisuke Murakami	N/A	Injury	

==== NHK Trophy ====
Date	Discipline	Withdrew	Added	Reason/Other notes	Refs
August 26	Pairs	N/A	(Austria) Miriam Ziegler / Severin Kiefer	Host pick	
September 1 and 13	Ice dance	(United Kingdom) Penny Coomes / Nicholas Buckland	(United States) Anastasia Cannuscio / Colin McManus	Injury (Coomes)	
September 13 and 20	Men	(Russia) Adian Pitkeev	(Latvia) Deniss Vasiļjevs	Injury	
October 17 and 31	Pairs	(Russia) Ksenia Stolbova / Fedor Klimov	(Germany) Mari Vartmann / Ruben Blommaert		
October 27; November 11	Men	(Japan) Sota Yamamoto	(Japan) Ryuju Hino	Injury	
November 7 and 10	Ladies	(United States) Polina Edmunds	(South Korea) Choi Da-bin		
November 17	Pairs	(Canada) Kirsten Moore-Towers / Michael Marinaro	N/A		
November 22	Men	(Italy) Ivan Righini	N/A		
November 22	Ladies	(Russia) Alena Leonova	N/A		

== Medal summary ==
=== Medalists ===
Event	Discipline	Gold	Silver	Bronze
Skate America	Men	(Japan) Shoma Uno	(United States) Jason Brown	(United States) Adam Rippon
Skate America	Ladies	(United States) Ashley Wagner	(United States) Mariah Bell	(Japan) Mai Mihara
Skate America	Pairs	(Canada) Julianne Séguin / Charlie Bilodeau	(United States) Haven Denney / Brandon Frazier	(Russia) Evgenia Tarasova / Vladimir Morozov
Skate America	Ice dancing	(United States) Maia Shibutani / Alex Shibutani	(United States) Madison Hubbell / Zachary Donohue	(Russia) Ekaterina Bobrova / Dmitri Soloviev

Event	Discipline	Gold	Silver	Bronze
Skate Canada	Men	(Canada) Patrick Chan	(Japan) Yuzuru Hanyu	(Canada) Kevin Reynolds
Skate Canada	Ladies	(Russia) Evgenia Medvedeva	(Canada) Kaetlyn Osmond	(Japan) Satoko Miyahara
Skate Canada	Pairs	(Canada) Meagan Duhamel / Eric Radford	(China) Yu Xiaoyu / Zhang Hao	(Canada) Liubov Ilyushechkina / Dylan Moscovitch
Skate Canada	Ice dancing	(Canada) Tessa Virtue / Scott Moir	(United States) Madison Chock / Evan Bates	(Canada) Piper Gilles / Paul Poirier

Event	Discipline	Gold	Silver	Bronze
Rostelecom Cup	Men	(Spain) Javier Fernández	(Japan) Shoma Uno	(Israel) Alexei Bychenko
Rostelecom Cup	Ladies	(Russia) Anna Pogorilaya	(Russia) Elena Radionova	(United States) Courtney Hicks
Rostelecom Cup	Pairs	(Germany) Aliona Savchenko / Bruno Massot	(Russia) Natalia Zabiiako / Alexander Enbert	(Russia) Kristina Astakhova / Alexei Rogonov
Rostelecom Cup	Ice dancing	(Russia) Ekaterina Bobrova / Dmitri Soloviev	(United States) Madison Chock / Evan Bates	(Canada) Kaitlyn Weaver / Andrew Poje

Event	Discipline	Gold	Silver	Bronze
Trophée de France	Men	(Spain) Javier Fernández	(Kazakhstan) Denis Ten	(United States) Adam Rippon
Trophée de France	Ladies	(Russia) Evgenia Medvedeva	(Russia) Maria Sotskova	(Japan) Wakaba Higuchi
Trophée de France	Pairs	(Germany) Aliona Savchenko / Bruno Massot	(Russia) Evgenia Tarasova / Vladimir Morozov	(France) Vanessa James / Morgan Ciprès
Trophée de France	Ice dancing	(France) Gabriella Papadakis / Guillaume Cizeron	(United States) Madison Hubbell / Zachary Donohue	(Canada) Piper Gilles / Paul Poirier

Event	Discipline	Gold	Silver	Bronze
Cup of China	Men	(Canada) Patrick Chan	(China) Jin Boyang	(Russia) Sergei Voronov
Cup of China	Ladies	(Russia) Elena Radionova	(Canada) Kaetlyn Osmond	(Russia) Elizaveta Tuktamysheva
Cup of China	Pairs	(China) Yu Xiaoyu / Zhang Hao	(China) Peng Cheng / Jin Yang	(Canada) Liubov Ilyushechkina / Dylan Moscovitch
Cup of China	Ice dancing	(United States) Maia Shibutani / Alex Shibutani	(Canada) Kaitlyn Weaver / Andrew Poje	(Russia) Alexandra Stepanova / Ivan Bukin

Event	Discipline	Gold	Silver	Bronze
NHK Trophy	Men	(Japan) Yuzuru Hanyu	(United States) Nathan Chen	(Japan) Keiji Tanaka
NHK Trophy	Ladies	(Russia) Anna Pogorilaya	(Japan) Satoko Miyahara	(Russia) Maria Sotskova
NHK Trophy	Pairs	(Canada) Meagan Duhamel / Eric Radford	(China) Peng Cheng / Jin Yang	(China) Wang Xuehan / Wang Lei
NHK Trophy	Ice dancing	(Canada) Tessa Virtue / Scott Moir	(France) Gabriella Papadakis / Guillaume Cizeron	(Italy) Anna Cappellini / Luca Lanotte

Event	Discipline	Gold	Silver	Bronze
Grand Prix Final	Men	(Japan) Yuzuru Hanyu	(United States) Nathan Chen	(Japan) Shoma Uno
Grand Prix Final	Ladies	(Russia) Evgenia Medvedeva	(Japan) Satoko Miyahara	(Russia) Anna Pogorilaya
Grand Prix Final	Pairs	(Russia) Evgenia Tarasova / Vladimir Morozov	(China) Yu Xiaoyu / Zhang Hao	(Canada) Meagan Duhamel / Eric Radford
Grand Prix Final	Ice dancing	(Canada) Tessa Virtue / Scott Moir	(France) Gabriella Papadakis / Guillaume Cizeron	(United States) Maia Shibutani / Alex Shibutani

=== Medal standings ===
Rank	Nation	Gold	Silver	Bronze	Total
1	Russia (RUS)	8	4	8	20
2	Canada (CAN)	8	3	7	18
3	United States (USA)	3	9	4	16
4	Japan (JPN)	3	4	5	12
5	Germany (GER)	2	0	0	2
5	Spain (ESP)	2	0	0	2
7	China (CHN)	1	5	1	7
8	France (FRA)	1	2	1	4
9	Kazakhstan (KAZ)	0	1	0	1
10	Israel (ISR)	0	0	1	1
10	Italy (ITA)	0	0	1	1
Totals (11 entries)		28	28	28	84

== Qualification ==
At each event, skaters earned points toward qualification for the Grand Prix Final. Following the sixth event, the top six highest scoring skaters/teams advanced to the Final. The points earned per placement were as follows:

Placement	Points (Singles)	Points (Pairs/Dance)
1st	15	15
2nd	13	13
3rd	11	11
4th	9	9
5th	7	7
6th	5	5
7th	4	–
8th	3	–
9th	–	–
10th	–	–

There were originally seven tie-breakers in cases of a tie in overall points:

1. Highest placement at an event. If a skater placed 1st and 3rd, the tiebreaker is the 1st place, and that beats a skater who placed 2nd in both events.
2. Highest combined total scores in both events. If a skater earned 200 points at one event and 250 at a second, that skater would win in the second tie-break over a skater who earned 200 points at one event and 150 at another.
3. Participated in two events.
4. Highest combined scores in the free skating/free dancing portion of both events.
5. Highest individual score in the free skating/free dancing portion from one event.
6. Highest combined scores in the short program/short dance of both events.
7. Highest number of total participants at the events.

If a tie remained, it was considered unbreakable and the tied skaters all advanced to the Grand Prix Final.

=== Qualification standings ===
Points	Men	Ladies	Pairs	Ice dance
30	(Spain) Javier Fernández (Canada) Patrick Chan	(Russia) Evgenia Medvedeva (Russia) Anna Pogorilaya	(Canada) Meagan Duhamel / Eric Radford (Germany) Aliona Savchenko / Bruno Massot	(Canada) Tessa Virtue / Scott Moir (United States) Maia Shibutani / Alex Shibutani
28	(Japan) Yuzuru Hanyu (Japan) Shoma Uno	(Russia) Elena Radionova	(China) Yu Xiaoyu / Zhang Hao	(France) Gabriella Papadakis / Guillaume Cizeron
26		(Canada) Kaetlyn Osmond	(China) Peng Cheng / Jin Yang	(Russia) Ekaterina Bobrova / Dmitri Soloviev (United States) Madison Chock / Evan Bates (United States) Madison Hubbell / Zachary Donohue
24		(Russia) Maria Sotskova (Japan) Satoko Miyahara	(Russia) Evgenia Tarasova / Vladimir Morozov	(Canada) Kaitlyn Weaver / Andrew Poje
22	(United States) Nathan Chen (United States) Adam Rippon		(Canada) Julianne Séguin / Charlie Bilodeau (Russia) Natalia Zabiiako / Alexander Enbert (United States) Haven Denney / Brandon Frazier (Canada) Liubov Ilyushechkina / Dylan Moscovitch	(Canada) Piper Gilles / Paul Poirier
20	(China) Jin Boyang (Russia) Sergei Voronov (Israel) Alexei Bychenko	(United States) Ashley Wagner (Russia) Elizaveta Tuktamysheva (Japan) Mai Mihara (Japan) Wakaba Higuchi	(France) Vanessa James / Morgan Ciprès (China) Wang Xuehan / Wang Lei	(Italy) Anna Cappellini / Luca Lanotte
18		(Canada) Gabrielle Daleman	(Russia) Kristina Astakhova / Alexei Rogonov	(Russia) Alexandra Stepanova / Ivan Bukin (Italy) Charlène Guignard / Marco Fabbri
17	(United States) Jason Brown			
16	(United States) Max Aaron (Russia) Mikhail Kolyada			(Russia) Victoria Sinitsina / Nikita Katsalapov (Russia) Elena Ilinykh / Ruslan Zhiganshin
15	(Japan) Keiji Tanaka			
14			(United States) Tarah Kayne / Daniel O'Shea	(United States) Kaitlin Hawayek / Jean-Luc Baker
13	(Kazakhstan) Denis Ten	(United States) Mariah Bell		
12		(China) Li Zijun (Japan) Rika Hongo	(Russia) Yuko Kavaguti / Alexander Smirnov (Italy) Nicole Della Monica / Matteo Guarise	(Israel) Isabella Tobias / Ilia Tkachenko
11	(Canada) Kevin Reynolds	(United States) Courtney Hicks		
10	(Japan) Takahito Mura (Israel) Daniel Samohin	(Kazakhstan) Elizabet Tursynbayeva (United States) Gracie Gold (South Korea) Park So-youn	(Austria) Miriam Ziegler / Severin Kiefer	(France) Marie-Jade Lauriault / Romain Le Gac
9	(Czech Republic) Michal Březina (Russia) Alexander Petrov (Uzbekistan) Misha Ge	(United States) Karen Chen (Japan) Yura Matsuda	(Italy) Valentina Marchei / Ondřej Hotárek	
8	(Canada) Nam Nguyen (Russia) Maxim Kovtun			
7	(China) Yan Han	(Canada) Alaine Chartrand (United States) Mirai Nagasu	(United States) Marissa Castelli / Mervin Tran (Germany) Mari Vartmann / Ruben Blommaert	(Poland) Natalia Kaliszek / Maksym Spodyriev (Russia) Tiffany Zahorski / Jonathan Guerreiro
6	(France) Chafik Besseghier			
5	(Belgium) Jorik Hendrickx (Latvia) Deniss Vasiļjevs (Canada) Elladj Baldé	(Japan) Mao Asada (France) Laurine Lecavelier	(Canada) Camille Ruest / Andrew Wolfe	(United States) Elliana Pogrebinsky / Alex Benoit (China) Wang Shiyue / Liu Xinyu
4		(South Korea) Choi Da-bin (Slovakia) Nicole Rajičová (France) Maé-Bérénice Méité (Russia) Serafima Sakhanovich		
3	(United States) Timothy Dolensky	(Italy) Roberta Rodeghiero (South Korea) Kim Na-hyun		

=== Qualifiers ===
	Men	Ladies	Pairs	Ice dancing
1	(Spain) Javier Fernández	(Russia) Evgenia Medvedeva	(Canada) Meagan Duhamel / Eric Radford	(Canada) Tessa Virtue / Scott Moir
2	(Canada) Patrick Chan	(Russia) Anna Pogorilaya	(Germany) ~~Aliona Savchenko / Bruno Massot~~ (withdrew)	(United States) Maia Shibutani / Alex Shibutani
3	(Japan) Yuzuru Hanyu	(Russia) Elena Radionova	(China) Yu Xiaoyu / Zhang Hao	(France) Gabriella Papadakis / Guillaume Cizeron
4	(Japan) Shoma Uno	(Canada) Kaetlyn Osmond	(China) Peng Cheng / Jin Yang	(Russia) Ekaterina Bobrova / Dmitri Soloviev
5	(United States) Nathan Chen	(Russia) Maria Sotskova	(Russia) Evgenia Tarasova / Vladimir Morozov	(United States) Madison Chock / Evan Bates
6	(United States) Adam Rippon	(Japan) Satoko Miyahara	(Canada) Julianne Séguin / Charlie Bilodeau	(United States) Madison Hubbell / Zachary Donohue
Alternates
1st	(China) Jin Boyang	(United States) Ashley Wagner	(Russia) Natalia Zabiiako / Alexander Enbert (called up)	(Canada) Kaitlyn Weaver / Andrew Poje
2nd	(Russia) Sergei Voronov	(Russia) Elizaveta Tuktamysheva	(United States) Haven Denney / Brandon Frazier	(Canada) Piper Gilles / Paul Poirier
3rd	(Israel) Alexei Bychenko	(Japan) Mai Mihara	(Canada) Liubov Ilyushechkina / Dylan Moscovitch	(Italy) Anna Cappellini / Luca Lanotte

== Top Grand Prix scores ==
=== Men ===
==== Total score ====
Rank	Name	Nation	Score	Event
1	Yuzuru Hanyu	Japan	301.47	2016 NHK Trophy
2	Javier Fernández	Spain	292.98	2016 Rostelecom Cup
3	Shoma Uno	Japan	285.07	2016 Rostelecom Cup
4	Nathan Chen	United States	282.85	2016–17 Grand Prix Final
5	Patrick Chan	Canada	279.72	2016 Cup of China
6	Jin Boyang	China	278.54	2016 Cup of China
7	Denis Ten	Kazakhstan	269.26	2016 Trophée de France
8	Jason Brown	United States	268.38	2016 Skate America
9	Adam Rippon	United States	267.53	2016 Trophée de France
10	Alexei Bychenko	Israel	255.52	2016 Rostelecom Cup

==== Short program ====
Rank	Name	Nation	Score	Event
1	Yuzuru Hanyu	Japan	106.53	2016–17 Grand Prix Final
2	Patrick Chan	Canada	99.76	2016–17 Grand Prix Final
3	Shoma Uno	Japan	98.59	2016 Rostelecom Cup
4	Javier Fernández	Spain	96.57	2016 Trophée de France
5	Jin Boyang	China	96.17	2016 Cup of China
6	Nathan Chen	United States	92.85	2016 Trophée de France
7	Mikhail Kolyada	Russia	90.28	2016 Rostelecom Cup
8	Denis Ten	Kazakhstan	89.21	2016 Trophée de France
9	Adam Rippon	United States	87.32	2016 Skate America
10	Alexei Bychenko	Israel	86.81	2016 Rostelecom Cup

==== Free program ====
Rank	Name	Nation	Score	Event
1	Javier Fernández	Spain	201.43	2016 Rostelecom Cup
2	Yuzuru Hanyu	Japan	197.58	2016 NHK Trophy
3	Nathan Chen	United States	197.55	2016–17 Grand Prix Final
4	Patrick Chan	Canada	196.31	2016 Cup of China
5	Shoma Uno	Japan	195.69	2016–17 Grand Prix Final
6	Jason Brown	United States	182.63	2016 Skate America
7	Jin Boyang	China	182.37	2016 Cup of China
8	Adam Rippon	United States	182.28	2016 Trophée de France
9	Denis Ten	Kazakhstan	180.05	2016 Trophée de France
10	Takahito Mura	Japan	170.04	2016 Trophée de France

=== Ladies ===
==== Total score ====
Rank	Name	Nation	Score	Event
1	Evgenia Medvedeva	Russia	227.66	2016–17 Grand Prix Final
2	Satoko Miyahara	Japan	218.33	2016–17 Grand Prix Final
3	Anna Pogorilaya	Russia	216.47	2016–17 Grand Prix Final
4	Kaetlyn Osmond	Canada	212.45	2016–17 Grand Prix Final
5	Elena Radionova	Russia	205.90	2016 Cup of China
6	Maria Sotskova	Russia	200.35	2016 Trophée de France
7	Ashley Wagner	United States	196.44	2016 Skate America
8	Wakaba Higuchi	Japan	194.48	2016 Trophée de France
9	Elizaveta Tuktamysheva	Russia	192.57	2016 Cup of China
10	Gabrielle Daleman	Canada	192.10	2016 Trophée de France

==== Short program ====
Rank	Name	Nation	Score	Event
1	Evgenia Medvedeva	Russia	79.21	2016–17 Grand Prix Final
2	Kaetlyn Osmond	Canada	75.54	2016–17 Grand Prix Final
3	Satoko Miyahara	Japan	74.64	2016–17 Grand Prix Final
4	Anna Pogorilaya	Russia	73.93	2016 Rostelecom Cup
5	Gabrielle Daleman	Canada	72.70	2016 Trophée de France
6	Elena Radionova	Russia	71.93	2016 Rostelecom Cup
7	Maria Sotskova	Russia	69.96	2016 NHK Trophy
8	Ashley Wagner	United States	69.50	2016 Skate America
9	Yulia Lipnitskaya	Russia	69.25	2016 Rostelecom Cup
10	Mai Mihara	Japan	68.48	2016 Cup of China

==== Free program ====
Rank	Name	Nation	Score	Event
1	Evgenia Medvedeva	Russia	148.45	2016–17 Grand Prix Final
2	Satoko Miyahara	Japan	143.69	2016–17 Grand Prix Final
3	Anna Pogorilaya	Russia	143.18	2016–17 Grand Prix Final
4	Kaetlyn Osmond	Canada	136.91	2016–17 Grand Prix Final
5	Elena Radionova	Russia	135.15	2016 Cup of China
6	Maria Sotskova	Russia	133.05	2016–17 Grand Prix Final
7	Mariah Bell	United States	130.67	2016 Skate America
8	Wakaba Higuchi	Japan	129.46	2016 Trophée de France
9	Elizaveta Tuktamysheva	Russia	127.69	2016 Cup of China
10	Ashley Wagner	United States	126.94	2016 Skate America

=== Pairs ===
==== Total score ====
Rank	Name	Nation	Score	Event
1	Meagan Duhamel / Eric Radford	Canada	218.30	2016 Skate Canada
2	Evgenia Tarasova / Vladimir Morozov	Russia	213.85	2016–17 Grand Prix Final
3	Aliona Savchenko / Bruno Massot	Germany	210.59	2016 Trophée de France
4	Yu Xiaoyu / Zhang Hao	China	203.76	2016 Cup of China
5	Vanessa James / Morgan Ciprès	France	198.58	2016 Trophée de France
6	Peng Cheng / Jin Yang	China	197.96	2016 Cup of China
7	Natalia Zabiiako / Alexander Enbert	Russia	197.77	2016 Rostelecom Cup
8	Julianne Séguin / Charlie Bilodeau	Canada	197.31	2016 Skate America
9	Haven Denney / Brandon Frazier	United States	192.65	2016 Skate America
10	Liubov Ilyushechkina / Dylan Moscovitch	Canada	191.54	2016 Cup of China

==== Short program ====
Rank	Name	Nation	Score	Event
1	Evgenia Tarasova / Vladimir Morozov	Russia	78.60	2016–17 Grand Prix Final
2	Meagan Duhamel / Eric Radford	Canada	78.39	2016 Skate Canada
3	Aliona Savchenko / Bruno Massot	Germany	77.55	2016 Trophée de France
4	Yu Xiaoyu / Zhang Hao	China	75.34	2016–17 Grand Prix Final
5	Peng Cheng / Jin Yang	China	73.33	2016 NHK Trophy
6	Natalia Zabiiako / Alexander Enbert	Russia	71.36	2016 Trophée de France
7	Liubov Ilyushechkina / Dylan Moscovitch	Canada	71.28	2016 Cup of China
8	Haven Denney / Brandon Frazier	United States	67.29	2016 Skate America
9	Valentina Marchei / Ondřej Hotárek	Italy	66.82	2016 Rostelecom Cup
10	Julianne Séguin / Charlie Bilodeau	Canada	66.49	2016 Skate America

==== Free program ====
Rank	Name	Nation	Score	Event
1	Meagan Duhamel / Eric Radford	Canada	139.91	2016 Skate Canada
2	Aliona Savchenko / Bruno Massot	Germany	138.38	2016 Rostelecom Cup
3	Evgenia Tarasova / Vladimir Morozov	Russia	135.25	2016–17 Grand Prix Final
4	Yu Xiaoyu / Zhang Hao	China	132.65	2016 Skate Canada
5	Vanessa James / Morgan Ciprès	France	132.53	2016 Trophée de France
6	Julianne Séguin / Charlie Bilodeau	Canada	130.82	2016 Skate America
7	Peng Cheng / Jin Yang	China	128.03	2016 Cup of China
8	Natalia Zabiiako / Alexander Enbert	Russia	128.01	2016 Rostelecom Cup
9	Haven Denney / Brandon Frazier	United States	125.36	2016 Skate America
10	Kristina Astakhova / Alexei Rogonov	Russia	123.23	2016 Rostelecom Cup

=== Ice dancing ===
==== Total score ====
Rank	Name	Nation	Score	Event
1	Tessa Virtue / Scott Moir	Canada	197.22	2016–17 Grand Prix Final
2	Gabriella Papadakis / Guillaume Cizeron	France	193.50	2016 Trophée de France
3	Maia Shibutani / Alex Shibutani	United States	189.60	2016–17 Grand Prix Final
4	Madison Chock / Evan Bates	United States	188.24	2016 Skate Canada
5	Ekaterina Bobrova / Dmitri Soloviev	Russia	186.68	2016 Rostelecom Cup
6	Piper Gilles / Paul Poirier	Canada	182.57	2016 Skate Canada
7	Kaitlyn Weaver / Andrew Poje	Canada	181.54	2016 Cup of China
8	Anna Cappellini / Luca Lanotte	Italy	180.42	2016 NHK Trophy
9	Madison Hubbell / Zachary Donohue	United States	179.59	2016–17 Grand Prix Final
10	Alexandra Stepanova / Ivan Bukin	Russia	177.41	2016 Cup of China

==== Short dance ====
Rank	Name	Nation	Score	Event
1	Tessa Virtue / Scott Moir	Canada	80.50	2016–17 Grand Prix Final
2	Gabriella Papadakis / Guillaume Cizeron	France	78.26	2016 Trophée de France
3	Maia Shibutani / Alex Shibutani	United States	77.97	2016–17 Grand Prix Final
4	Madison Chock / Evan Bates	United States	76.21	2016 Skate Canada
5	Ekaterina Bobrova / Dmitri Soloviev	Russia	74.92	2016 Rostelecom Cup
6	Kaitlyn Weaver / Andrew Poje	Canada	73.78	2016 Cup of China
7	Madison Hubbell / Zachary Donohue	United States	72.47	2016–17 Grand Prix Final
8	Piper Gilles / Paul Poirier	Canada	72.12	2016 Skate Canada
9	Alexandra Stepanova / Ivan Bukin	Russia	72.09	2016 Cup of China
10	Anna Cappellini / Luca Lanotte	Italy	72.00	2016 NHK Trophy

==== Free dance ====
Rank	Name	Nation	Score	Event
1	Tessa Virtue / Scott Moir	Canada	116.72	2016–17 Grand Prix Final
2	Gabriella Papadakis / Guillaume Cizeron	France	115.24	2016 Trophée de France
3	Maia Shibutani / Alex Shibutani	United States	112.71	2016 Skate America
4	Madison Chock / Evan Bates	United States	112.03	2016 Skate Canada
5	Ekaterina Bobrova / Dmitri Soloviev	Russia	111.76	2016 Rostelecom Cup
6	Piper Gilles / Paul Poirier	Canada	110.45	2016 Skate Canada
7	Anna Cappellini / Luca Lanotte	Italy	109.27	2016 Skate Canada
8	Kaitlyn Weaver / Andrew Poje	Canada	108.76	2016 Rostelecom Cup
9	Madison Hubbell / Zachary Donohue	United States	107.81	2016 Trophée de France
10	Alexandra Stepanova / Ivan Bukin	Russia	105.32	2016 Cup of China
