= 2016 Skate America =

Figure skating competition

- Type: Grand Prix
- Date: October 21 – 23
- Season: 2016–17
- Location: Chicago, Illinois
- Host: U.S. Figure Skating
- Venue: Sears Centre

Champions
- Men's singles: (Japan) Shoma Uno
- Ladies' singles: (United States) Ashley Wagner
- Pairs: (Canada) Julianne Séguin / Charlie Bilodeau
- Ice dance: (United States) Maia Shibutani / Alex Shibutani
- Previous: 2015 Skate America
- Next: 2017 Skate America
- Next Grand Prix: 2016 Skate Canada International

The 2016 Skate America was the first event of six in the 2016–17 ISU Grand Prix of Figure Skating, a senior-level international invitational competition series. It was held at the Sears Centre in Chicago, Illinois, on October 21–23. Medals were awarded in the disciplines of men's singles, ladies' singles, pair skating, and ice dancing. Skaters earned points toward qualifying for the 2016–17 Grand Prix Final.

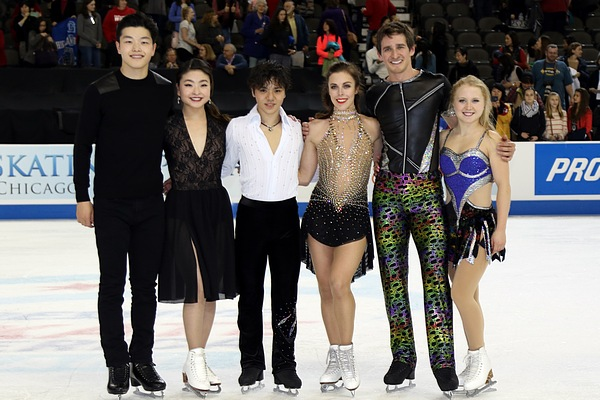
Skate America 2016 Exhibition Gold Medalists winners

== Entries ==
The ISU published the preliminary assignments on June 30, 2016.

Country	Men	Ladies	Pairs	Ice dancing
Australia	Brendan Kerry			
Belgium	Jorik Hendrickx			
Canada	Nam Nguyen	Gabrielle Daleman	Julianne Séguin / Charlie Bilodeau	
China	Jin Boyang			
France			Vanessa James / Morgan Ciprès	
Israel				Isabella Tobias / Ilia Tkachenko
Italy		Roberta Rodeghiero	Valentina Marchei / Ondřej Hotárek	Charlène Guignard / Marco Fabbri
Japan	Shoma Uno	Mao Asada; Mai Mihara; Kanako Murakami		Kana Muramoto / Chris Reed
Latvia		Angelīna Kučvaļska		
South Korea		Park So-youn		Yura Min / Alexander Gamelin
Russia	Maxim Kovtun; Sergei Voronov	Serafima Sakhanovich	Kristina Astakhova / Alexei Rogonov; Evgenia Tarasova / Vladimir Morozov	Ekaterina Bobrova / Dmitri Soloviev; Elena Ilinykh / Ruslan Zhiganshin
Turkey				Alisa Agafonova / Alper Uçar
United States	Jason Brown; Timothy Dolensky; Adam Rippon	Mariah Bell; Gracie Gold; Ashley Wagner	Marissa Castelli / Mervin Tran; Haven Denney / Brandon Frazier; Tarah Kayne / Daniel O'Shea	Madison Hubbell / Zachary Donohue; Elliana Pogrebinsky / Alex Benoit; Maia Shibutani / Alex Shibutani

=== Changes to preliminary assignments ===
Date	Discipline	Withdrew	Added	Reason/Other notes	Refs
August 10	Pairs	(United States) Madeline Aaron / Max Settlage	(United States) Haven Denney / Brandon Frazier	Split	
August 16	Men	N/A	(United States) Timothy Dolensky	Host pick	
August 22	Ladies	N/A	(United States) Angela Wang	Host pick	
September 9	Ice dancing	N/A	(United States) Elliana Pogrebinsky / Alex Benoit	Host pick	
September 14	Pairs	N/A	(United States) Marissa Castelli / Mervin Tran	Host pick	
September 22 and 23	Pairs	(China) Sui Wenjing / Han Cong	(Italy) Valentina Marchei / Ondřej Hotárek	Injury (Sui)	
September 22 and 23	Ice dancing	(South Korea) Rebeka Kim / Kirill Minov	(South Korea) Yura Min / Alexander Gamelin		
October 12	Ladies	(United States) Angela Wang	(United States) Mariah Bell	Injury	
October 16	Men	(Kazakhstan) Denis Ten	Not replaced		
October 17	Ladies	(Russia) Yulia Lipnitskaya	Not replaced	Injury	
October 20	Men	(Japan) Daisuke Murakami	Not replaced	Injury	

== Results ==
=== Men ===
Rank	Name	Nation	Total points	SP		FS	
1	Shoma Uno	Japan	279.34	1	89.15	1	190.19
2	Jason Brown	United States	268.38	3	85.75	2	182.63
3	Adam Rippon	United States	261.43	2	87.32	3	174.11
4	Sergei Voronov	Russia	245.28	5	78.68	5	166.60
5	Jin Boyang	China	245.08	8	72.93	4	172.15
6	Nam Nguyen	Canada	239.26	4	79.62	7	159.64
7	Maxim Kovtun	Russia	230.75	10	67.43	6	163.32
8	Timothy Dolensky	United States	226.53	6	77.59	8	148.94
9	Jorik Hendrickx	Belgium	224.91	7	76.62	9	148.29
10	Brendan Kerry	Australia	211.76	9	71.62	10	140.14

=== Ladies ===
Rank	Name	Nation	Total points	SP		FS	
1	Ashley Wagner	United States	196.44	1	69.50	2	126.94
2	Mariah Bell	United States	191.59	6	60.92	1	130.67
3	Mai Mihara	Japan	189.28	2	65.75	3	123.53
4	Gabrielle Daleman	Canada	186.63	4	64.49	4	122.14
5	Gracie Gold	United States	184.22	3	64.87	5	119.35
6	Mao Asada	Japan	176.78	5	64.47	6	112.31
7	Serafima Sakhanovich	Russia	163.84	8	56.52	7	107.32
8	Park So-youn	South Korea	161.36	7	58.16	8	103.20
9	Roberta Rodeghiero	Italy	149.13	9	52.62	10	96.51
10	Kanako Murakami	Japan	145.03	10	47.87	9	97.16
11	Angelīna Kučvaļska	Latvia	134.97	11	47.80	11	87.17

=== Pairs ===
Rank	Name	Nation	Total points	SP		FS	
1	Julianne Séguin / Charlie Bilodeau	Canada	197.31	3	66.49	1	130.82
2	Haven Denney / Brandon Frazier	United States	192.65	2	67.29	2	125.36
3	Evgenia Tarasova / Vladimir Morozov	Russia	185.94	1	75.24	5	110.70
4	Vanessa James / Morgan Ciprès	France	174.65	4	65.78	7	108.87
5	Kristina Astakhova / Alexei Rogonov	Russia	174.52	5	64.34	6	110.18
6	Tarah Kayne / Daniel O'Shea	United States	173.50	8	57.93	3	115.57
7	Marissa Castelli / Mervin Tran	United States	171.95	7	61.17	4	110.78
8	Valentina Marchei / Ondřej Hotárek	Italy	169.69	6	62.49	8	107.20

=== Ice dancing ===
Rank	Name	Nation	Total points	SD		FD	
1	Maia Shibutani / Alex Shibutani	United States	185.75	1	73.04	1	112.71
2	Madison Hubbell / Zachary Donohue	United States	175.77	3	68.78	2	106.99
3	Ekaterina Bobrova / Dmitri Soloviev	Russia	174.77	2	68.92	3	105.85
4	Charlène Guignard / Marco Fabbri	Italy	165.44	5	64.79	4	100.65
5	Elena Ilinykh / Ruslan Zhiganshin	Russia	165.16	4	66.60	6	98.56
6	Isabella Tobias / Ilia Tkachenko	Israel	161.99	6	63.33	5	98.66
7	Elliana Pogrebinsky / Alex Benoit	United States	151.76	8	58.18	7	93.58
8	Kana Muramoto / Chris Reed	Japan	147.37	10	56.19	8	91.18
9	Alisa Agafonova / Alper Uçar	Turkey	146.10	7	58.98	9	87.12
10	Yura Min / Alexander Gamelin	South Korea	141.50	9	56.25	10	85.25
