= 2016 Trophée de France =

Figure skating competition

- Type: Grand Prix
- Date: November 11 – 13
- Season: 2016–17
- Location: Paris
- Host: French Federation of Ice Sports
- Venue: AccorHotels Arena

Champions
- Men's singles: (Spain) Javier Fernández
- Ladies' singles: (Russia) Evgenia Medvedeva
- Pairs: (Germany) Aliona Savchenko / Bruno Massot
- Ice dance: (France) Gabriella Papadakis / Guillaume Cizeron
- Previous: 2015 Trophée Éric Bompard
- Next: 2017 Internationaux de France
- Previous Grand Prix: 2016 Rostelecom Cup
- Next Grand Prix: 2016 Cup of China

The 2016 Trophée de France was the fourth of the six events in the 2016–17 ISU Grand Prix of Figure Skating, a senior-level international invitational competition series. It was held at the AccorHotels Arena in Paris on November 11–13. Medals were awarded in the disciplines of men's singles, ladies' singles, pair skating, and ice dancing. Skaters earned points toward qualifying for the 2016–17 Grand Prix Final.

The competition, known as the Trophée Éric Bompard since 2004, lost its title sponsor in the summer of 2016 due to a lack of communication from the French Federation of Ice Sports.

== Entries ==
The ISU published the preliminary assignments on June 30, 2016.

Country	Men	Ladies	Pairs	Ice dancing
Armenia		Anastasia Galustyan		
Australia	Brendan Kerry			
Austria			Miriam Ziegler / Severin Kiefer	
Belarus				Viktoria Kavaliova / Yurii Bieliaiev
Belgium	Jorik Hendrickx			
Canada		Gabrielle Daleman		Piper Gilles / Paul Poirier
Czech Republic				Cortney Mansour / Michal Češka
France	Chafik Besseghier	Laurine Lecavelier; Maé-Bérénice Méité	Vanessa James / Morgan Ciprès	Lorenza Alessandrini / Pierre Souquet; Marie-Jade Lauriault / Romain Le Gac; Gabriella Papadakis / Guillaume Cizeron
Germany			Aliona Savchenko / Bruno Massot	
Israel				Isabella Tobias / Ilia Tkachenko
Italy	Ivan Righini			
Japan	Takahito Mura	Mao Asada; Wakaba Higuchi; Yuka Nagai		
Kazakhstan	Denis Ten			
South Korea		Park So-youn		
Russia	Artur Dmitriev Jr.	Evgenia Medvedeva; Alena Leonova; Maria Sotskova	Evgenia Tarasova / Vladimir Morozov; Natalja Zabijako / Alexander Enbert	Elena Ilinykh / Ruslan Zhiganshin
Spain	Javier Fernández			
Ukraine				Oleksandra Nazarova / Maxim Nikitin
United States	Nathan Chen; Adam Rippon	Gracie Gold	Marissa Castelli / Mervin Tran	Madison Hubbell / Zachary Donohue
Uzbekistan	Misha Ge			

=== Changes to initial assignments ===
Date	Discipline	Withdrew	Added	Reason/Other notes	Refs
July 7	Ice dancing	(Slovakia) Federica Testa / Lukáš Csölley	(Czech Republic) Cortney Mansour / Michal Češka	Split	
September 1 and 12	Ice dance	(United Kingdom) Penny Coomes / Nicholas Buckland	(Belarus) Viktoria Kavaliova / Yurii Bieliaiev	Injury (Coomes)	
September 13 and 21	Men	(Russia) Adian Pitkeev	(Belgium) Jorik Hendrickx	Injury	
October 12 and 17	Ladies	(United States) Tyler Pierce	(Armenia) Anastasia Galustyan	Injury	
October 24; November 1	Men	(France) Romain Ponsart	(Australia) Brendan Kerry		
October 24	Pairs	(France) Camille Mendoza / Pavel Kovalev	Not replaced		
October 27	Men	(Japan) Sota Yamamoto	Not replaced	Injury	
November 7	Pairs	(France) Lola Esbrat / Andrei Novoselov	Not replaced		

The French organisers decided not to replace Mendoza/Kovalev despite the ISU's rules stating that it is "mandatory" to invite another pair if one withdraws more than 14 days before the event. The pairs' competition ended up with only six entries after a further withdrawal (Esbrat / Novoselov).

== Results ==
=== Men ===
Rank	Name	Nation	Total points	SP		FS	
1	Javier Fernández	Spain	285.38	1	96.57	1	188.81
2	Denis Ten	Kazakhstan	269.26	3	89.21	3	180.05
3	Adam Rippon	United States	267.53	4	85.25	2	182.28
4	Nathan Chen	United States	264.80	2	92.85	4	171.95
5	Takahito Mura	Japan	248.42	6	78.38	5	170.04
6	Jorik Hendrickx	Belgium	230.47	5	80.34	8	150.13
7	Misha Ge	Uzbekistan	229.06	8	72.49	6	156.57
8	Chafik Besseghier	France	225.02	7	77.00	9	148.02
9	Artur Dmitriev	Russia	218.70	11	64.48	7	154.22
10	Brendan Kerry	Australia	199.40	9	70.67	10	128.73
11	Ivan Righini	Italy	185.81	10	68.42	11	117.39

=== Ladies ===
Rank	Name	Nation	Total points	SP		FS	
1	Evgenia Medvedeva	Russia	221.54	1	78.52	1	143.02
2	Maria Sotskova	Russia	200.35	3	68.71	2	131.64
3	Wakaba Higuchi	Japan	194.48	5	65.02	3	129.46
4	Gabrielle Daleman	Canada	192.10	2	72.70	6	119.40
5	Park So-youn	South Korea	185.19	6	64.89	4	120.30
6	Laurine Lecavelier	France	184.65	4	66.61	7	118.04
7	Maé-Bérénice Méité	France	172.65	11	52.78	5	119.87
8	Gracie Gold	United States	165.89	10	54.87	8	111.02
9	Mao Asada	Japan	161.39	8	61.29	10	100.10
10	Yuka Nagai	Japan	159.49	12	52.41	9	107.08
11	Anastasia Galustyan	Armenia	155.49	9	56.92	11	98.57
12	Alena Leonova	Russia	141.36	7	63.87	12	77.49

=== Pairs ===
Rank	Name	Nation	Total points	SP		FS	
1	Aliona Savchenko / Bruno Massot	Germany	210.59	1	77.55	1	133.04
2	Evgenia Tarasova / Vladimir Morozov	Russia	206.94	2	76.24	3	130.70
3	Vanessa James / Morgan Ciprès	France	198.58	4	66.05	2	132.53
4	Natalja Zabijako / Alexander Enbert	Russia	192.56	3	71.36	4	121.20
5	Marissa Castelli / Mervin Tran	United States	176.18	5	59.26	5	116.92
6	Miriam Ziegler / Severin Kiefer	Austria	145.01	6	52.06	6	92.95

=== Ice dancing ===
Rank	Name	Nation	Total points	SD		FD	
1	Gabriella Papadakis / Guillaume Cizeron	France	193.50	1	78.26	1	115.24
2	Madison Hubbell / Zachary Donohue	United States	174.58	3	66.77	2	107.81
3	Piper Gilles / Paul Poirier	Canada	170.78	4	64.74	3	106.04
4	Elena Ilinykh / Ruslan Zhiganshin	Russia	167.40	2	68.72	4	98.68
5	Isabella Tobias / Ilia Tkachenko	Israel	158.86	5	63.70	5	95.16
6	Marie-Jade Lauriault / Romain Le Gac	France	150.07	6	57.37	6	92.70
7	Oleksandra Nazarova / Maxim Nikitin	Ukraine	145.39	7	56.61	7	88.78
8	Cortney Mansour / Michal Češka	Czech Republic	140.92	8	55.69	8	85.23
9	Lorenza Alessandrini / Pierre Souquet	France	130.12	9	48.18	9	81.94
10	Viktoria Kavaliova / Yurii Bieliaiev	Belarus	115.04	10	46.81	10	68.23
