= 2016 Skate Canada International =

Figure skating competition

- Type: Grand Prix
- Date: October 28 – 30
- Season: 2016–17
- Location: Mississauga, Ontario
- Host: Skate Canada
- Venue: Hershey Centre

Champions
- Men's singles: (Canada) Patrick Chan
- Ladies' singles: (Russia) Evgenia Medvedeva
- Pairs: (Canada) Meagan Duhamel / Eric Radford
- Ice dance: (Canada) Tessa Virtue / Scott Moir
- Previous: 2015 Skate Canada International
- Next: 2017 Skate Canada International
- Previous Grand Prix: 2016 Skate America
- Next Grand Prix: 2016 Rostelecom Cup

The 2016 Skate Canada International was the second of six in the 2016–17 ISU Grand Prix of Figure Skating, a senior-level international invitational competition series. It was held at the Hershey Centre in Mississauga, Ontario on October 28–30. Medals were awarded in the disciplines of men's singles, ladies' singles, pair skating, and ice dancing. Skaters earned points toward qualifying for the 2016–17 Grand Prix Final.

== Entries ==
The ISU published the preliminary assignments on June 30, 2016.

Country	Men	Ladies	Pairs	Ice dancing
Canada	Patrick Chan; Liam Firus; Kevin Reynolds	Alaine Chartrand; Kaetlyn Osmond	Meagan Duhamel / Eric Radford; Brittany Jones / Joshua Reagan; Lubov Ilyushechkina / Dylan Moscovitch	Piper Gilles / Paul Poirier; Alexandra Paul / Mitchell Islam; Tessa Virtue / Scott Moir
China	Yan Han		Yu Xiaoyu / Zhang Hao	Wang Shiyue / Liu Xinyu
Czech Republic	Michal Březina			
Denmark				Laurence Fournier Beaudry / Nikolaj Sørensen
Finland				Cecilia Törn / Jussiville Partanen
Israel	Daniel Samohin			
Italy			Nicole Della Monica / Matteo Guarise	Anna Cappellini / Luca Lanotte
Japan	Yuzuru Hanyu; Takahito Mura	Rika Hongo; Satoko Miyahara; Yuka Nagai		
South Korea		Choi Da-bin; Kim Na-hyun		
Russia	Alexander Petrov	Evgenia Medvedeva; Elizaveta Tuktamysheva	Yuko Kavaguti / Alexander Smirnov	Alexandra Stepanova / Ivan Bukin
Sweden		Joshi Helgesson		
United States	Grant Hochstein; Ross Miner	Mirai Nagasu	Haven Denney / Brandon Frazier	Madison Chock / Evan Bates; Kaitlin Hawayek / Jean-Luc Baker
Uzbekistan	Misha Ge			

=== Changes to initial assignments ===
Date	Discipline	Withdrew	Added	Reason/Other notes	Refs
July 7	Ice dancing	(Slovakia) Federica Testa / Lukáš Csölley	(Finland) Cecilia Törn / Jussiville Partanen	Split	
August 17	Men	N/A	(Canada) Kevin Reynolds	Host pick	
August 17	Ladies	N/A	(Canada) Véronik Mallet	Host pick	
August 17	Pairs	N/A	(Canada) Brittany Jones / Joshua Reagan	Host pick	
September 21 and 30	Ladies	(Russia) Maria Artemieva	(South Korea) Kim Na-hyun		
October 25	Pairs	(Russia) Vera Bazarova / Andrei Deputat	not replaced	Injury	
October 26	Ladies	(Canada) Véronik Mallet	not replaced	Injury	

== Results ==
=== Men ===
Rank	Name	Nation	Total points	SP		FS	
1	Patrick Chan	Canada	266.95	1	90.56	2	176.39
2	Yuzuru Hanyu	Japan	263.06	4	79.65	1	183.41
3	Kevin Reynolds	Canada	245.06	3	80.57	3	164.49
4	Michal Březina	Czech Republic	227.42	9	70.36	4	157.06
5	Daniel Samohin	Israel	226.53	5	74.62	7	151.91
6	Misha Ge	Uzbekistan	226.07	7	72.30	5	153.77
7	Alexandr Petrov	Russia	224.39	8	71.50	6	152.89
8	Takahito Mura	Japan	222.13	2	81.24	9	140.89
9	Liam Firus	Canada	210.89	10	70.09	10	140.80
10	Yan Han	China	209.11	6	72.86	11	136.25
11	Grant Hochstein	United States	204.69	12	60.20	8	144.49
12	Ross Miner	United States	196.53	11	63.92	12	132.61

=== Ladies ===
Rank	Name	Nation	Total points	SP		FS	
1	Evgenia Medvedeva	Russia	220.65	1	76.24	1	144.41
2	Kaetlyn Osmond	Canada	206.45	2	74.33	2	132.12
3	Satoko Miyahara	Japan	192.08	5	65.24	3	126.84
4	Elizaveta Tuktamysheva	Russia	187.99	3	66.79	5	121.20
5	Alaine Chartrand	Canada	185.56	6	62.15	4	123.41
6	Rika Hongo	Japan	171.19	4	65.75	8	105.44
7	Choi Da-bin	South Korea	165.78	8	53.29	6	112.49
8	Kim Na-hyun	South Korea	164.48	7	60.46	9	104.02
9	Mirai Nagasu	United States	151.42	9	53.19	11	98.23
10	Joshi Helgesson	Sweden	149.77	10	49.72	10	100.05
11	Yuka Nagai	Japan	147.56	11	40.39	7	107.17

=== Pairs ===
Rank	Name	Nation	Total points	SP		FS	
1	Meagan Duhamel / Eric Radford	Canada	218.30	1	78.39	1	139.91
2	Yu Xiaoyu / Zhang Hao	China	202.08	2	69.43	2	132.65
3	Liubov Ilyushechkina / Dylan Moscovitch	Canada	190.22	3	67.53	3	122.69
4	Haven Denney / Brandon Frazier	United States	188.23	4	66.50	4	121.73
5	Yuko Kavaguti / Alexander Smirnov	Russia	182.75	5	64.40	6	118.35
6	Nicole Della Monica / Matteo Guarise	Italy	178.67	6	59.25	5	119.42
7	Brittany Jones / Joshua Reagan	Canada	151.68	7	54.23	7	97.45

=== Ice dancing ===
Rank	Name	Nation	Total points	SD		FD	
1	Tessa Virtue / Scott Moir	Canada	189.06	1	77.23	2	111.83
2	Madison Chock / Evan Bates	United States	188.24	2	76.21	1	112.03
3	Piper Gilles / Paul Poirier	Canada	182.57	3	72.12	3	110.45
4	Anna Cappellini / Luca Lanotte	Italy	180.35	4	71.08	4	109.27
5	Alexandra Stepanova / Ivan Bukin	Russia	168.10	5	68.12	5	99.98
6	Kaitlin Hawayek / Jean-Luc Baker	United States	162.19	6	65.01	6	97.18
7	Laurence Fournier Beaudry / Nikolaj Sørensen	Denmark	156.71	7	62.63	7	94.08
8	Alexandra Paul / Mitchell Islam	Canada	144.85	8	58.83	9	86.02
9	Wang Shiyue / Liu Xinyu	China	144.16	9	57.86	8	86.30
10	Cecilia Törn / Jussiville Partanen	Finland	139.14	10	56.98	10	82.16
