= Angela Wang =

American ladies' figure skater

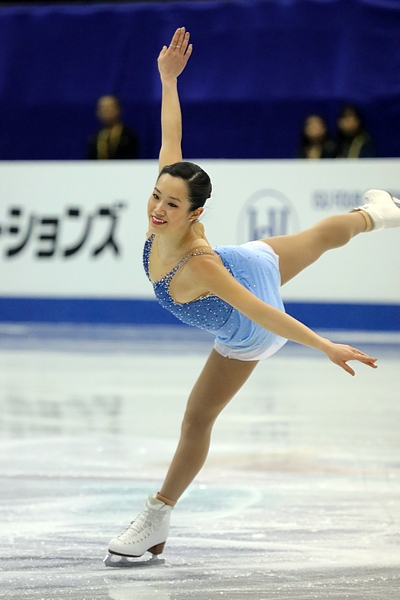
- Angela Wang in 2018

Personal information
- Born: July 30, 1996 (age 30) Salt Lake City, Utah
- Height: 5 ft 1 in (1.55 m)

Figure skating career
- Country: United States
- Coach: Ravi Walia
- Skating club: Salt Lake City FSC
- Began skating: 2002

Angela Wang (born July 30, 1996) is an American figure skater. She is the 2017 Bavarian Open champion, a three-time medalist on the ISU Challenger Series, and a three-time medalist on the ISU Junior Grand Prix (JGP) series. Her JGP medals include gold from a 2012 competition in Croatia.

== Personal life ==
Angela Wang, an only child, was born in Salt Lake City, Utah. Her mother, Shuyan, is an English-Mandarin translator, while her father, Laixin, is a pharmaceutical drug developer. Her parents moved from China to the United States in 1994.

Wang graduated from Cheyenne Mountain High School in 2014. She then majored in exercise science at the University of Colorado Colorado Springs.

== Career ==
Wang began skating in 2002 because the Winter Olympics were held that year in her hometown of Salt Lake City. She made her ISU Junior Grand Prix (JGP) debut during the 2010–2011 season, placing fourth at her sole assignment, the SBC Cup held in Japan.

Wang relocated to Colorado Springs in the summer of 2011 and joined Christy Krall and Damon Allen. Competing in the 2012 JGP series, she won bronze in Lake Placid, New York, and gold in Zagreb, Croatia. She qualified for the JGP Final, where she placed fourth. She was coached by Christy Krall, Damon Allen, and Janet Champion in Colorado Springs, Colorado.

The following season, Wang took silver in Gdańsk, Poland and placed fifth in Ostrava, Czech Republic, becoming the first alternate for the JGP Final. She was called up when Karen Chen withdrew and finished sixth.

Making her senior international debut, Wang medaled at two 2014–15 ISU Challenger Series events, taking bronze at the Lombardia Trophy and silver at the Autumn Classic. She placed 15th at the 2015 U.S. Championships and 10th at the 2016 U.S. Championships.

In October 2016, Wang withdrew from the 2016 Skate America due to a right ankle injury. She finished 7th at the U.S. Championships in January 2017 and won gold the following month at the Bavarian Open.

In January 2018, Wang placed 7th again at the U.S. Figure Skating Championships and was named as the third alternate for the 2018 Winter Olympics team. During the season, she was coached by Christy Krall, Ryan Bradley, and Erik Schulz in Colorado Springs, Colorado. She then relocated to Edmonton, Alberta, Canada, to be coached by Ravi Walia.

== Programs ==
Season	Short program	Free skating
2018–2019	Praying by Kesha	Send In the Clowns performed by Barbra Streisand
2017–2018	Over the Rainbow performed by Katharine McPhee choreo. by Phillip Mills	Circles by Greta Svabo Bech choreo. by Tanith Belbin White, Charlie White
2016–2017	Over the Rainbow performed by Katharine McPhee choreo. by Phillip Mills	In the Mood by Glenn Miller; The Notebook by Aaron Zigman choreo. by Jeffrey Buttle
2015–2016	Paint It Black by Angèle Dubeau & La Pietà choreo. by Rachael Flatt	En Aranjuez con tu amor performed by Sarah Brightman choreo. by Mark Pillay
2014–2015	Paint It Black by Angèle Dubeau & La Pietà choreo. by Rachael Flatt	Papa, Can You Hear Me? by Itzhak Perlman; The Way He Makes Me Feel by Moscow Virtuosi
2013–2014	A Beautiful Storm by Jennifer Thomas choreo. by Tom Dickson	Nights in the Gardens of Spain by Manuel de Falla choreo. by Catarina Lindgren
2012–2013	Crouching Tiger, Hidden Dragon by Tan Dun	Ladies in Lavender by Nigel Hess
2011–2012	A League of Their Own by Hans Zimmer	Crouching Tiger, Hidden Dragon by Tan Dun
2010–2011	Mulan by Jerry Goldsmith	How to Train Your Dragon by John Powell
2009–2010	Yellow River Concerto performed by Lang Lang	Turandot by Giacomo Puccini
2008–2009	Nessun dorma (from Turandot) by Giacomo Puccini	New World Concerto by Antonín Dvořák

== Competitive highlights ==
GP: Grand Prix; CS: Challenger Series; JGP: Junior Grand Prix

=== 2010–2011 to present ===
International
Event	10–11	11–12	12–13	13–14	14–15	15–16	16–17	17–18	18–19
Four Continents								9th	
GP Finland									11th
GP NHK Trophy									11th
GP Rostelecom Cup					9th				
GP France						8th			
CS Autumn Classic					2nd				
CS Finlandia								4th	8th
CS Golden Spin						5th			
CS Lombardia					3rd				
CS Tallinn Trophy								5th	
CS U.S. Classic						3rd			
Autumn Classic						3rd			
Philadelphia								2nd	
Bavarian Open							1st		
International: Junior
JGP Final			4th	6th					
JGP Croatia			1st						
JGP Czech Republic				5th					
JGP Japan	4th								
JGP Poland				2nd					
JGP U.S.			3rd						
National
U.S. Champ.		8th	9th	15th	15th	10th	7th	7th	WD
U.S. Collegiate Champ.						2nd	1st		
J = Junior level; TBD = Assigned; WD = Withdrew

=== 2005–2006 to 2009–2010 ===
National
Event	09–10
U.S. Champ.	7th J
Levels: V = Juvenile; I = Intermediate; N = Novice; J = Junior
