= Christine Haigler =

American figure skater (born 1948)

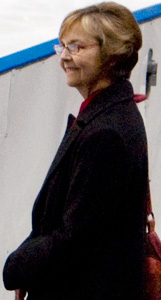
- Krall in 2010

Personal information
- Full name: Christine Haigler
- Other names: Christy Krall
- Born: January 5, 1948 (age 78) Colorado Springs, Colorado

Figure skating career
- Country: United States
- Skating club: Broadmoor Skating Club

Christine "Christy" Haigler (married name: Krall, born January 5, 1948) is an American former competitive figure skater. She is the 1963 and 1965 U.S. silver medalist and 1964 bronze medalist. She represented the United States at the 1964 Winter Olympics, where she placed 7th.

Krall graduated from Cheyenne Mountain High School and Colorado College and trained at the Broadmoor Skating Club. She began coaching part-time at age 18 as an assistant to Carlo Fassi. From 1996 to 2002, Krall served as the senior director of athlete programs for U.S. Figure Skating and was a member of the delegation at the 2002 Winter Olympics in that capacity. She was one of the developers of the USFSA's moves in the field test structure.

Krall coaches in Colorado Springs, Colorado. Her current and former students include Patrick Chan (from mid-December 2009 to April 2012), Agnes Zawadzki (from June 2011 to October 2013), Armin Mahbanoozadeh (from December 2011), Angela Wang, and Joshua Farris.

She began coaching two-time US National Champion Alysa Liu in November 2021.

== Competitive highlights ==
Event	1961	1962	1963	1964	1965
Winter Olympics				7th	
World Championships			19th	5th	4th
U.S. Championships	4th N.	1st J.	2nd	3rd	2nd
