= Yura Min =

Korean-American ice dancer (born 1995)

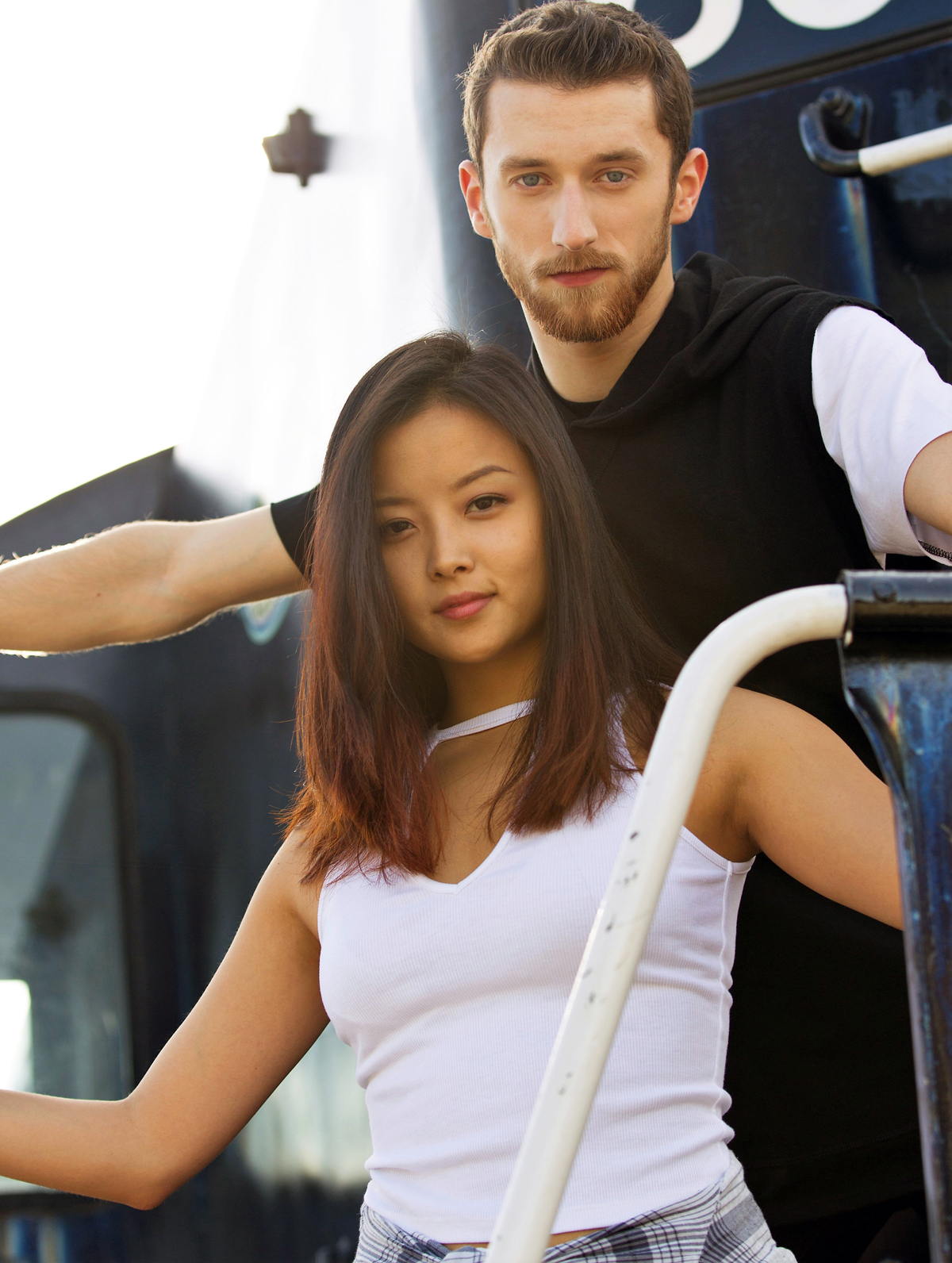
- Yura Min and Alexander Gamelin (KOR)

Personal information
- Native name: 민유라
- Born: August 15, 1995 (age 31) Torrance, California, U.S.
- Height: 5 ft 4 in (1.63 m)

Figure skating career
- Country: South Korea
- Partner: Daniel Eaton
- Coach: Igor Shpilband; Fabian Bourzat; Greg Zuerlein; Adrienne Lenda
- Began skating: 2001

Yura Min (Korean: 민유라; born August 15, 1995) is a Korean-American ice dancer who skates with Daniel Eaton for South Korea, with whom she is the 2020 Korean National Champion. With former partner Alexander Gamelin, she is a two-time South Korean national champion. They finished seventh at the 2018 Four Continents Championships and participated in the 2018 Winter Olympics at Pyeongchang, South Korea.

== Personal life ==
Yura Min was born on August 15, 1995, in Torrance, California, to Hye Young Chu of Busan, South Korea, and Harrison Min of Seoul, South Korea. She is a citizen of both the United States and South Korea.

== Career ==
=== Early career ===
Min started learning to skate in 2001. She teamed up with Igor Ogay in 2012. Competing on the junior level, they took silver at the Pacific Coast Sectionals and qualified for the 2013 U.S. Championships, where they finished 11th. Their partnership then came to an end.

Min teamed up with Timothy Koleto in April 2013. Representing South Korea, the duo placed tenth at the 2014 Four Continents Championships and eighth at an ISU Challenger Series event, the 2014 CS Nebelhorn Trophy. They finished fifth at their last event together, the International Cup of Nice in October 2014. Igor Shpilband and Greg Zuerlein coached them in Novi, Michigan.

== Partnership with Gamelin ==
=== 2015–2016 season ===
In 2015, Min teamed up with Alexander Gamelin. They were coached by Igor Shpilband, Fabian Bourzat, Greg Zuerlein, and Adrienne Lenda in Novi, Michigan.

Making their international debut, Min/Gamelin placed fifth at the 2015 CS Ice Challenge. After finishing fourth at the NRW Trophy and seventh at the 2015 CS Warsaw Cup, they were awarded silver behind Rebeka Kim / Kirill Minov at the 2016 South Korean Championships. At the 2016 Four Continents Championships in Taipei, they placed ninth in the short dance, eighth in the free dance, and eighth overall, ending up as the top Korean dancers at the event.

=== 2016–2017 season ===
Starting their second competitive season together with an early event, the 2016 Lake Placid Ice Dance International, Min/Gamelin placed third in the short dance and second in the free dance, winning the bronze medal overall. The team finished in the top six for all three ISU Challenger Series competitions skated, the U.S. International Figure Skating Classic, the Nebelhorn Trophy, and the CS Tallinn Trophy, and made their ISU Grand Prix debut at Skate America finishing in 10th place. They advanced to Free Dance and placed 20th at 2017 World Figure Skating Championships in Helsinki. On the domestic front, Min and Gamelin earned the gold medal in senior dance at both the 2017 KSU President Cup Ranking Competition and the 2017 South Korean Figure Skating Championships.

=== 2017–2018 season ===
Min/Gamelin decided to skate to Arirang for their free dance. In September, they competed at the 2017 CS Nebelhorn Trophy, the final qualifying opportunity for the 2018 Winter Olympics. They finished fourth, earning a spot for South Korea in the Olympic ice dancing event.

On July 18, 2018, Min and Gamelin announced the end of their partnership.

== Partnership with Eaton ==
On September 22, 2018, Min and Daniel Eaton announced they had formed a partnership.

=== 2019–2020 season ===
Min/Eaton began their partnership competing in several minor competitions, and two Challengers, placing ninth at both the 2019 CS Nebelhorn Trophy and the 2019 CS Golden Spin of Zagreb. After winning the South Korean national title, they placed eighth at the 2020 Four Continents Championships. They were assigned to make their World Championship debut, but the COVID-19 pandemic resulted in that event's cancellation.

=== 2020–2021 season ===
Due to Eaton's back problems, Min and Eaton did not compete during the 2020–21 season.

=== 2021–2022 season ===
Min/Eaton initially planned to skate their rhythm dance to a medley of Queen songs, but after receiving critiques from judges at the Lake Placid Ice Dance International as to whether it suited the street dance theme, they changed it to a Macklemore theme. They two competed at the 2021 CS Nebelhorn Trophy, seeking to qualify a place for South Korea at the 2022 Winter Olympics, but came seventh at the event and were named only the second reserve.

== Programs ==
=== With Daniel Eaton ===
Season	Rhythm dance	Free dance
2021–2022	Blues: Down by Marian Hill; Hip Hop: Thrift Shop by Macklemore	I Dreamed a Dream; One Day More (from Les Misérables) by Claude-Michel Schönberg, Alain Boublil, Herbert Kretzmer
2019–2020	Quickstep: 42nd Street; Blues: 42nd Street; Quickstep: 42nd Street by Harry Warren	Love is a Bitch by Two Feet; Nemesis by Benjamin Clementine

=== With Gamelin ===
Season	Short dance	Free dance	Exhibition
2017–2018	Samba: Despacito by Luis Fonsi, Erika Ender, Daddy Yankee performed by Luis Fonsi; Rhumba: My All by Mariah Carey; Samba: Mujer Latina performed by Thalía	Arirang by 한돌 performed by Sohyang	Super Mario (OST); Arirang by 한돌 performed by Sohyang; Lollipop by Big Bang & 2NE1
2016–2017	Blues: Your Heart Is As Black As Night by Beth Hart and Joe Bonamassa; Hip hop: I Am the Best X Bang Bang Bang by 2NE1 and Big Bang	Cinema Paradiso by Ennio Morricone: Cinema in Fiamme; Runaway, Search and Run; Love Theme for Nata	
2015–2016	Cirque du Soleil: Waltz: Carrousel by Benoît Jutras; Polka: Balade au boit d'une echelle; Waltz: Carrousel by Benoît Jutras	The Beatles: Because; Get Back; Here Comes the Sun; The End	

=== With Koleto ===
Season	Short dance	Free dance
2014–2015	Flamenco: Lucia by Óscar López; Paso doble: Malagueña; Flamenco: Fiesta Flamenca by Monty Kelly	Belleville Rendez-Vous; Under the Bridge; Theme Bruno by Benoît Charest; Suzy by Caravan Palace
2013–2014	Quickstep: Kap'n Kid; Foxtrot: Un mate in luca by Raphael Gualazzi; Quickstep: Kap'n Kid	Notre-Dame de Paris by Riccardo Cocciante

=== With Ogay ===
Season	Short dance	Free dance
2012–2013		West Side Story by Leonard Bernstein

== Competitive highlights ==
GP: Grand Prix; CS: Challenger Series; JGP: Junior Grand Prix

=== With Eaton ===
International
Event	19–20	20–21	21–22
Worlds	C	WD	
Four Continents	8th		
CS Lombardia Trophy			WD
CS Nebelhorn Trophy	9th		7th
CS Ondrej Nepela Trophy	9th		
Bosphorous Cup	5th		
Lake Placid IDI	7th		6th
Mezzaluna Cup	4th		
Santa Claus Cup	4th		
U.S. Classic			4th
National
South Korean Champ.	1st		
TBD = Assigned; WD = Withdrew; C = Event cancelled

=== With Gamelin ===
International
Event	2015–16	2016–17	2017–18	2018–19
Olympics			18th	
Worlds		20th	21st	
Four Continents	8th	8th	7th	
GP Skate America		10th		WD
CS Ice Challenge	5th			
CS Ice Star			5th	
CS Nebelhorn Trophy		6th	4th	
CS Ondrej Nepela			4th	
CS Tallinn Trophy		5th		
CS U.S. Classic		6th		
CS Warsaw Cup	7th			
NRW Trophy	4th			
Lake Placid IDI		3rd		
National
South Korean Champ.	2nd	1st	1st	
Team events
Olympics			9th T 9th P	
TBD = Assigned; WD = Withdrew

=== With Koleto ===
International
Event	2013–14	2014–15
Four Continents	10th	
CS Nebelhorn Trophy		8th
Bavarian Open	10th	
Cup of Nice		5th
Ukrainian Open	9th	
National
South Korean Champ.	1st	

=== With Ogay ===
National
Event	2012–13
U.S. Championships	11th J
Pacific Coast Sectionals	2nd J
J = Junior level

== Detailed results ==
=== with Alexander Gamelin ===
At team events, medals awarded for team results only.

2017–18 season
Date	Event	SP	FS	Total
March 19–25, 2018	2018 World Championships	21; 58.82	DNQ	21
February 14–23, 2018	2018 Winter Olympics	16; 61.22	19; 86.52	18; 147.74
February 9–12, 2018	2018 Winter Olympics (team event)	9; 51.97	–	9^{T}
January 22–28, 2018	2018 Four Continents Championships	7; 60.11	7; 91.27	7; 151.38
January 5–7, 2018	2018 South Korean Championships	1; 59.67	1; 90.27	1; 149.94
October 26–29, 2017	2017 CS Minsk-Arena Ice Star	5; **61.97**	5; 90.03	5; **152.00**
September 27–30, 2017	2017 CS Nebelhorn Trophy	7; 55.94	5; 87.86	4; 143.80
September 21–23, 2017	2017 CS Ondrej Nepela Trophy	5; 56.66	6; 85.12	4; 141.78
2016–17 season
Date	Event	SP	FS	Total
March 29 – April 2, 2017	2017 World Championships	19; 57.47	20; 79.24	20; 136.71
February 15–19, 2017	2017 Four Continents Championships	8; 59.01	8; 85.68	8; 144.69
January 6–8, 2017	2017 South Korean Championships	1; 56.34	1; 78.02	1; 134.36
November 20–27, 2016	2016 CS Tallinn Trophy	6; 59.22	5; **92.13**	5; 151.35
September 22–24, 2016	2016 CS Nebelhorn Trophy	6; 55.38	5; 83.88	6; 139.26
October 21–23, 2016	2016 Skate America	9; 56.25	10; 85.25	10; 141.50
September 14–18, 2016	2016 CS U.S. International Classic	4; 55.48	8; 79.26	6; 134.74
July 28–29, 2016	Lake Placid Ice Dance International	3; 55.14	2; 83.70	3; 138.84
2015–16 season
Date	Event	SP	FS	Total
February 16–21, 2016	2016 Four Continents Championships	9; 55.23	8; 83.19	8; 138.42
January 8–10, 2016	2016 South Korean Championships	2; 53.05	2; 74.13	2; 127.18
November 27–29, 2015	2015 CS Warsaw Cup	7; 46.50	7; 73.34	7; 119.84
November 6–8, 2015	2015 NRW Trophy	4; 53.13	4; 78.96	4; 132.09
October 27–31, 2015	2015 CS Ice Challenge	6; 40.48	5; 67.28	5; 107.76

=== with Timothy Koleto ===
2014–15 season
Date	Event	SP	FS	Total
October 15–19, 2014	2014 International Cup of Nice	6; 40.04	4; 68.84	5; 108.88
September 24–27, 2014	2014 CS Nebelhorn Trophy	8; 40.10	8; 63.36	8; 103.46
2013–14 season
Date	Event	SP	FS	Total
January 29 – February 2, 2014	2014 Bavarian Open	10; 44.53	10; 65.68	10; 110.21
January 20–26, 2014	2014 Four Continents Championships	8; 45.12	10; 66.11	10; 111.23
January 3–5, 2014	2014 South Korean Championships	1	1	1; 105.49
December 18–20, 2013	2013 Ukrainian Open			9

=== with Igor Ogay ===
2012–13 season
Date	Event	Level	SP	FS	Total
January 20–22, 2013	2013 U.S. Junior Championships	Junior	12; 32.45	10; 57.18	11; 89.63

- Personal bests highlighted in **bold**.
