= Ravi Walia =

Canadian figure skater (born 1973)

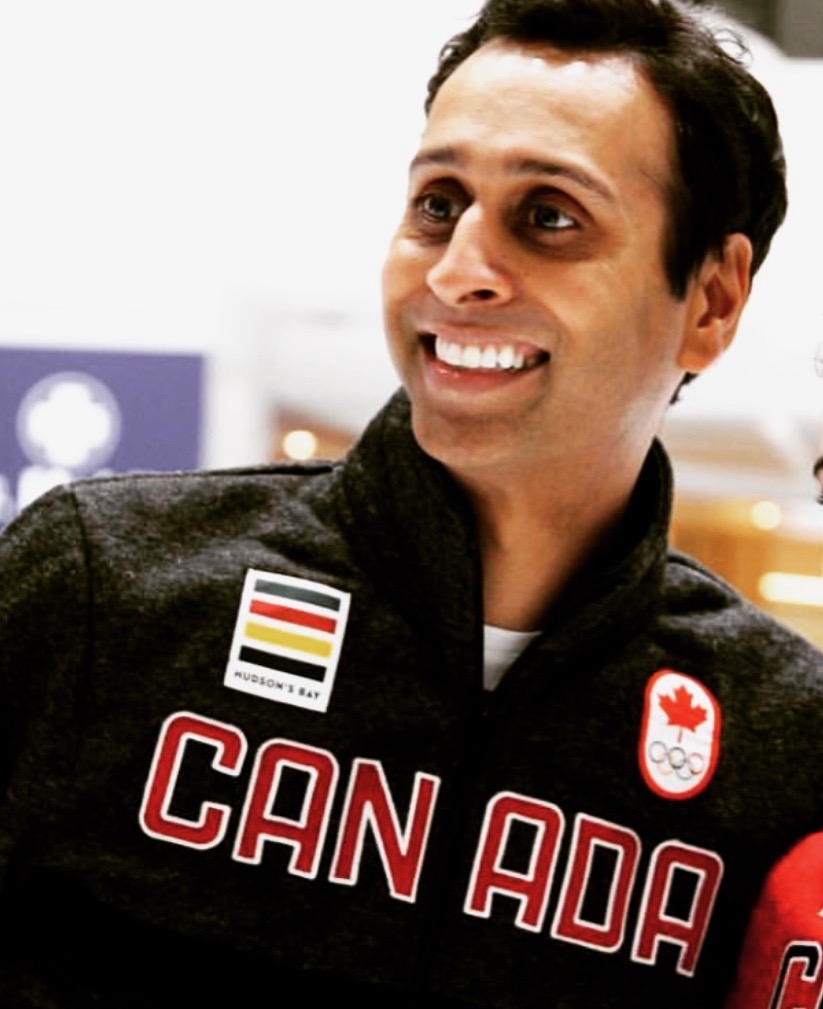
- Walia in 2018

Personal information
- Born: April 7, 1973 (age 52) New Westminster, British Columbia

Ravi Walia (born April 7, 1973 in New Westminster, British Columbia) is a Canadian figure skating coach and former competitor. He is the 1995 Canadian national bronze medallist and the 1993 Canadian national junior champion, representing the Kerrisdale Figure Skating Club, where he was coached by Dr. Hellmut May. He was later coached by Jan Ullmark and Cynthia Ullmark at The Royal Glenora Club in Edmonton, Alberta.

Walia serves as an ISU Technical Specialist for Canada. He has coached several national and international champions and began coaching Kaetlyn Osmond when she was ten years old. Osmond is the 2018 Olympic bronze medallist, 2018 Olympic team gold medallist, 2018 World gold medallist, 2017 World silver medallist, 2014 Olympic team silver medallist, and a three-time Canadian national champion. In 2017, Walia began coaching Patrick Chan and coached him to a tenth Canadian national title and an Olympic team gold medal.

In addition, he has coached Kaiya Ruiter, Matthew Newnham, Conrad Orzel, Aurora Cotop and Rose Théroux.

Walia was awarded Skate Canada's "Competitive Coach Award of Excellence" in 2013 and 2018. In 2014, 2017, and 2018, he was awarded the "Petro-Canada Coaching Excellence Award".

== Competitive highlights ==
GP: Champions Series (Grand Prix)

International
Event	90–91	91–92	92–93	93–94	94–95	95–96	96–97	97–98	98–99	99–00	00–01
GP Cup of Russia								10th			
GP Skate Canada								10th			
Schäfer Memorial				5th							
National
Canadian Champ.	6th J	4th J	1st J		3rd	11th	4th	8th	8th	4th	5th
