= Isabella Tobias =

Israeli ice dancer (born 1991)

Isabella Tobias Lites
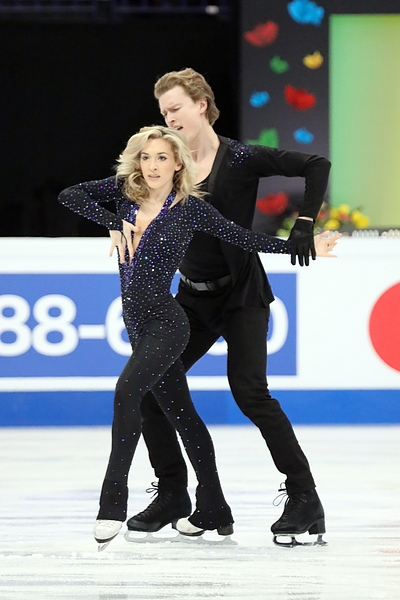
- Tobias and Tkachenko in 2017

Personal information
- Native name: איזבלה טוביאס לייטס
- Born: August 23, 1991 (age 35) New York City, New York, United States
- Home town: Detroit, United States
- Height: 1.63 m (5 ft 4 in)
- Spouse: Samuel Lites

Figure skating career
- Country: Israel (2015–17); Lithuania (2010–14); Georgia (2007–08)
- Partner: Ilia Tkachenko
- Coach: Marina Zueva, Johnny Johns, Massimo Scali, Oleg Epstein
- Skating club: Israel ISF
- Began skating: 1998
- Retired: January 29, 2018

Isabella Tobias (Hebrew: איזבלה טוביאס; born August 23, 1991) is an Israeli retired ice dancer who competed for Georgia, Lithuania, and Israel.

Earlier in her career, Tobias skated with Otar Japaridze for Georgia and with Deividas Stagniūnas for Lithuania.

With Stagniūnas, she won the bronze medal at the 2011 Skate America, placed in the top ten at two European Championships, and represented Lithuania at the 2014 Winter Olympics in Sochi.

Folllwing Stagniūnas' retirement, Tobias competed with Ilia Tkachenko for Israel. Together, they won four medals on the ISU Challenger Series.

== Personal life ==
Isabella Tobias was born August 23, 1991, in New York City. She and her family are Jewish. She is the daughter of Stephen Tobias, president and co-founder of I.A. Englander & Co., one of the largest institutional equity derivatives brokers on the American stock exchange. After completing high school, she briefly attended Columbia University's School of General Studies. From 1999 to 2007 she attended the George Balanchine School of American Ballet and performed with the New York City Ballet.

In October 2012, Tobias applied for Lithuanian citizenship. In December, she was interviewed by the Citizenship Commission and passed the Lithuanian language test; however, the application was denied by Lithuanian President Dalia Grybauskaitė on January 7, 2013. It was granted on December 5, 2013.

Tobias married Samuel Lites in June 2017. In 2019, Lites decided to finish her degree at Southern Methodist University. She was a member of Kappa Kappa Gamma sorority there, as well as Phi Beta Kappa and the Robert Stewart Hyer Society, and graduated with honors in May 2020.

== Early career ==
Isabella Tobias started skating in 1998 at the age of seven. She took up ice dancing at age 10 and competed with Kurt Lingenfelter on the intermediate level and with James Warren in novice. In 2003, she decided to leave skating to focus on ballet.

Tobias returned to skating in September 2007 and teamed up with Otar Japaridze to compete for Georgia. They appeared together on the junior level during the 2007–08 season, placing 14th at the 2008 World Junior Championships.

== Partnership with Stagniūnas ==
In spring 2010, Tobias teamed up with Lithuanian ice dancer Deividas Stagniūnas. They initially trained under Igor Shpilband and Marina Zueva in Canton, Michigan.

=== 2010–2011 season ===
Tobias/Stagniūnas made their debut at the 2010 Nebelhorn Trophy, where they placed 11th, and won their first international medal, bronze, at the 2010 NRW Trophy. At their first European and World Championships, they placed 12th and 14th respectively.

=== 2011–2012 season ===
Tobias/Stagniūnas won bronze at a Grand Prix event, the 2011 Skate America. They finished 9th at the 2012 European Championships and 18th at the 2012 World Championships.

=== 2012–2013 season ===
In June 2012, Tobias/Stagniūnas moved from Canton, Michigan to Novi, Michigan, following coach Igor Shpilband. According to IOC rules, Olympic competitors must be citizens of the country they are representing. In order to allow the team to compete at the 2014 Winter Olympics, Tobias submitted an application for Lithuanian citizenship in October 2012. It was denied on January 7, 2013.

Tobias/Stagniūnas withdrew from the 2013 European Championships as a result of Stagniūnas' back problem. By finishing 15th at the 2013 World Championships in London, Ontario, they qualified a spot for Lithuania in the Olympic ice dancing event.

=== 2013–2014 season ===
Tobias was granted Lithuanian citizenship in December 2013. Tobias/Stagniūnas placed ninth at the 2014 European Championships in January in Budapest, 17th at the 2014 Winter Olympics in February in Sochi, and then 15th at the 2014 World Championships in March in Saitama. In early May 2014, Stagniūnas announced his competitive retirement due to recurring injuries.

== Partnership with Tkachenko ==
=== Formation ===
Tobias and Russia's Ilia Tkachenko teamed up in the summer of 2014 to represent Israel. They had skated together previously for six months in 2008.

=== 2015–2016 season ===
Tobias/Tkachenko began the season on the Challenger Series (CS), winning silver medals at the Finlandia Trophy and Mordovian Ornament. They placed 10th at the 2016 European Championships in Bratislava, Slovakia, and 12th at the 2016 World Championships in Boston, United States. They were coached by Igor Shpilband and Adrienne Lenda in Novi, Michigan.

=== 2016–2017 season ===
Tobias/Tkachenko ranked 4th at the 2016 CS Autumn Classic International in Canada before making their Grand Prix debut as a team. After placing 6th at the 2016 Skate America and 5th at the 2016 Trophée de France, they won silver behind Elena Ilinykh / Ruslan Zhiganshin at the 2016 CS Tallinn Trophy.

The two placed 12th at the 2017 World Championships in Helsinki, Finland. Due to their result, Israel qualified a spot in the ice dancing event at the 2018 Winter Olympics in Pyeongchang, South Korea. They were coached by Shpilband and Lenda in Novi, Michigan.

On 12 April 2017, Tobias/Tkachenko announced a coaching change, having decided to join Marina Zoueva, Oleg Epstein, Massimo Scali, and Johnny Johns at the Arctic Edge in Canton, Michigan.

=== 2017–2018 season ===
Tobias/Tkachenko withdrew from both of their Grand Prix assignments – the 2017 NHK Trophy and 2017 Skate America. Due to Tkachenko's unsuccessful application for Israeli citizenship, they were not included in Israel's team to the 2018 Winter Olympics.

She announced her retirement on January 29, 2018.

== Programs ==
=== With Tkachenko ===
| Season | Short dance | Free dance | Exhibition |
|---|---|---|---|
| 2017–2018 | Shape of You by Ed Sheeran; She Will Be Loved from Rhythms del Mundo; Fireball by Pitbull | Samson et Delilah by Camille Saint-Saëns | |
| 2016–2017 | Blues: Real Life; Hip hop: Can't Feel My Face by The Weeknd | Pas de deux (from The Nutcracker) by Pyotr Ilyich Tchaikovsky | Earned It by The Weeknd |
| 2015–2016 | Waltz and polka: Cinderella by Patrick Doyle; March | Polovtsian Dances by Alexander Borodin | |

=== With Stagniūnas ===
| Season | Short dance | Free dance | Exhibition |
|---|---|---|---|
| 2013–2014 | Foxtrot: A Fine Romance; Quickstep: Diamonds Are a Girl's Best Friends by Marilyn Monroe | James Bond Theme; Skyfall by Adele | |
| 2012–2013 | Oklahoma! by Rodgers and Hammerstein | Piano Concerto No. 2 by Sergei Rachmaninoff | |
| 2011–2012 | Shakira medley | Let's Twist Again by Chubby Checker; Only You by The Platters; Tutti Frutti by Little Richard | Hips Don't Lie by Shakira |
| 2010–2011 | Waltz of the Flowers (from The Nutcracker) by Pyotr Ilyich Tchaikovsky | Les Misérables by Claude-Michel Schönberg | |

=== With Japaridze ===
| Season | Original dance | Free dance |
|---|---|---|
| 2007–2008 | Two Guitars performed by Zoltan and his Gypsy Ensemble; Dark Eyes performed by Bigrock Balalaikas | Sarabande by George Frideric Handel; Furioso by Aria; Sarabande Suite by Globus |

== Results ==
GP: Grand Prix; CS: Challenger Series; JGP: Junior Grand Prix

=== With Tkachenko for Israel ===
International
| Event | 2015–16 | 2016–17 | 2017–18 |
|---|---|---|---|
| World Champ. | 12th | 12th | |
| European Champ. | 10th | 4th | |
| GP NHK Trophy | | | WD |
| GP Skate America | | 6th | WD |
| GP Trophée de France | | 5th | |
| CS Autumn Classic | | 4th | |
| CS Finlandia Trophy | 2nd | | |
| CS Mordovian Ornament | 2nd | | |
| CS Tallinn Trophy | 1st | 2nd | |
| Lake Placid IDI | 1st | | |
TBD = Assigned; WD = Withdrew

=== With Stagniūnas for Lithuania ===
International
| Event | 2010–11 | 2011–12 | 2012–13 | 2013–14 |
|---|---|---|---|---|
| Winter Olympics | | | | 17th |
| World Champ. | 14th | 18th | 15th | 15th |
| European Champ. | 12th | 9th | | 9th |
| GP Skate America | | 3rd | | |
| GP Cup of Russia | | 5th | | |
| Nebelhorn Trophy | 11th | 5th | | |
| Golden Spin | | | 4th | |
| NRW Trophy | 3rd | | | |
National
| Lithuanian Champ. | 1st | 1st | 1st | |

=== With Japaridze for Georgia ===
International
| Event | 2007–08 |
|---|---|
| World Junior Championships | 14th |
| JGP Germany | 7th |
| JGP United Kingdom | 6th |
