= Ilia Tkachenko =

Russian ice dancer (born 1986)

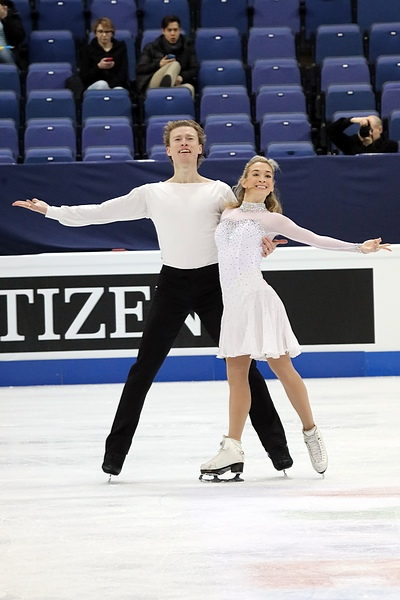
- Tobias and Tkachenko in 2017

Personal information
- Native name: Илья Алексеевич Ткаченко
- Full name: Ilia Alexeyevich Tkachenko
- Born: 26 December 1986 (age 39) Perm, Russian SFSR, Soviet Union
- Home town: Detroit, Michigan, U.S.
- Height: 1.82 m (5 ft 11 1/2 in)

Figure skating career
- Country: Israel
- Partner: Isabella Tobias
- Coach: Marina Zueva, Johnny Johns, Massimo Scali, Oleg Epstein
- Skating club: Ice Holon Israel
- Began skating: 1991
Medal record
Figure skating: Ice dancing
Representing Russia (with Riazanova)
Russian Championships
Silver medal – second place	2011 Saransk	Ice dancing
Bronze medal – third place	2012 Saransk	Ice dancing
Bronze medal – third place	2013 Sochi	Ice dancing
Representing Russia (with Monko)
Junior Grand Prix Final
Gold medal – first place	2007–08 Gdansk	Ice dancing
Representing Russia (with Gorshkova)
World Junior Championships
Bronze medal – third place	2005 Kitchener	Ice dancing

Ilia Alexeyevich Tkachenko (Russian: Илья Алексеевич Ткаченко, born 26 December 1986) is a Russian former competitive ice dancer. Skating for Russia with Ekaterina Riazanova, he became the 2010 Trophée Eric Bompard silver medalist, the 2012 Skate Canada International bronze medalist, and a three-time Russian national medalist. Competing with Isabella Tobias for Israel, he won four medals on the ISU Challenger Series.

== Personal life ==
Tkachenko was born on 26 December 1986 in Perm, Russian SFSR, the elder of two boys. He studied municipal administration. He married his wife, Ksenia, who is also from Perm, on 15 June 2012.

After deciding to compete for Israel, Tkachenko applied for Israeli citizenship. In November 2017, news media reported that his application had been unsuccessful.

== Career ==
=== Early career ===
Tkachenko began skating at the age of four in Perm. Initially, he was a single skater, training in Andrei Kislukhin's group, but when it dissolved he took up ice dancing. He moved with his grandmother to Moscow at age 13.

Tkachenko competed with Anastasia Gorshkova from 2002 to 2006, coached by her father, Alexei Gorshkov. They won the bronze medal at the 2005 World Junior Championships and four medals on the ISU Junior Grand Prix series — two gold, one silver, one bronze. They finished 7th at the 2006 World Junior Championships. Gorshkova retired from competition in July 2006 due to a hip injury.

=== 2006–2007 season: Debut of Monko/Tkachenko ===
Around late August 2006, Tkachenko began training with Maria Monko in Odintsovo under Gorshkov. They won the silver medal at the 2007 Russian Junior Championships and placed fifth at the 2007 World Junior Championships.

=== 2007–2008 season ===
Monko/Tkachenko won a pair of medals on the Junior Grand Prix series and qualified for the JGP Final where they took gold. They finished fourth at the 2008 World Junior Championships after Monko fell on twizzles in both the original and free dance.

=== 2008–2009 season ===
Monko/Tkachenko received two senior Grand Prix assignments, 2008 Skate America and 2008 Trophée Eric Bompard, and prepared new programs. They withdrew, however, from both events.

After their partnership ended, Tkachenko briefly skated with Isabella Tobias in 2008. Tobias and Tkachenko did not compete together. In spring 2009, Tkachenko expressed interest in skating with Ekaterina Riazanova. After a tryout, they both felt it would be a good partnership, despite her needing time to adapt to his different technique and some disapproval from the Russian skating federation. They decided to be coached by Gorshkov at Odintsovo FSC, near Moscow.

=== 2009–2010 season: Debut of Riazanova/Tkachenko ===
Riazanova/Tkachenko began competing together during the 2009–2010 season. They finished fourth at the 2009 Nebelhorn Trophy, sixth at their sole Grand Prix event, the 2009 Cup of Russia, and fourth at the Russian Nationals.

=== 2010–2011 season ===
Riazanova/Tkachenko decided to scrap the free dance they had planned for the 2010–2011 season and prepare a new one. They placed fifth at their first Grand Prix event of the season, the 2010 Skate America, and then won silver at the 2010 Trophée Eric Bompard. At the 2011 Russian Nationals, they won the silver medal and their first berth to the European Championships. At the 2011 Europeans, Riazanova/Tkachenko placed fifth in the short dance, sixth in the free dance, and sixth overall. Russia had only two spots to the World Championships and since both Bobrova/Soloviev and Ilinykh/Katsalapov had placed ahead of them at Europeans, they did not make the team, however, they continued training as first alternates and also worked on new programs until the end of May; after vacation, they resumed training for the new season on 20 June, including a three-week camp in Bulgaria.

=== 2011–2012 season ===
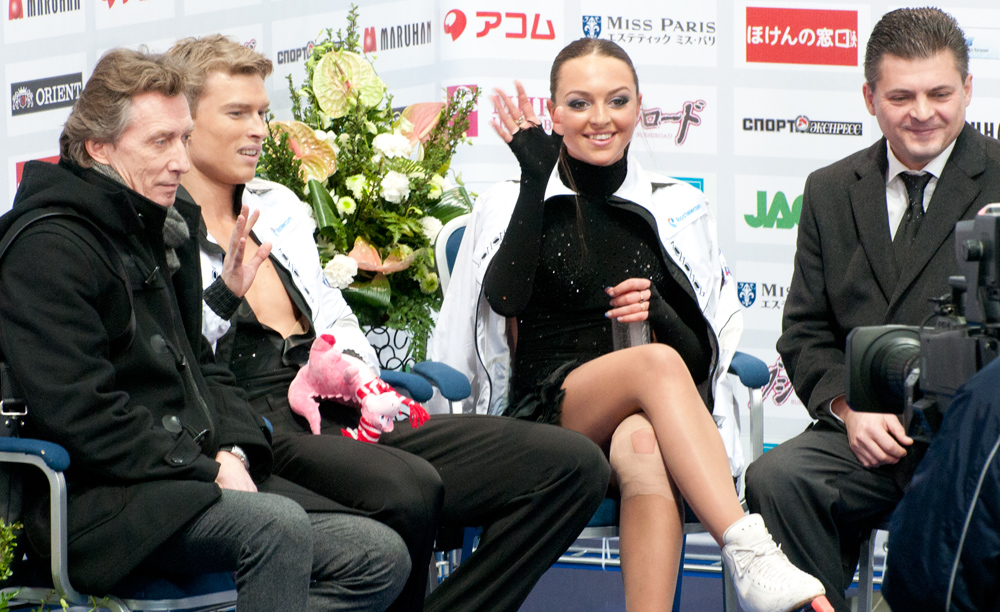
Riazanova and Tkachenko with coach Alexei Gorshkov (right) and choreographer Sergei Petukhov (left)

For the 2011–2012 season, Riazanova/Tkachenko were assigned to 2011 Skate Canada and 2011 Cup of Russia as their Grand Prix events. On their free dance, which was choreographed by Sergei Petukhov, Riazanova said, "A young woman remembers her beloved, who is no longer alive. She is so deeply immersed in the memories of happy times that her dreams seem to become reality for a short while." They had to withdraw from 2011 Nebelhorn Trophy because Tkachenko's new passport was not ready. On 13 December 2011 Riazanova sustained a concussion and a broken nose when Tkachenko accidentally elbowed her in practice; she was released from hospital at her own risk on 20 December At the Russian Championships which began on December 25, Riazanova/Tkachenko won the bronze medal after placing third in the short dance and fourth in the free dance. They finished 5th overall at the 2012 European Championships but received a small bronze medal for their 3rd place in the short dance. They finished 9th at the 2012 World Championships.

=== 2012–2013 season ===
In April 2012, Tkachenko said that they would spend some time preparing for the following season in Marina Zueva and Igor Shpilband's group in the United States, however, the coaches parted ways so the skaters decided to train with Shpilband in Novi, Michigan. At a camp in Bulgaria, Tkachenko lost his balance while practicing a lift on the floor in skates and stepped on Riazanova's hand; she had surgery on her hand and recovered well. At the suggestion of Tatiana Tarasova, they decided to scrap a new free dance to Pink Floyd's Hey You and made a new one to a waltz from the Godfather films. Riazanova/Tkachenko won bronze medals at the 2012 Skate Canada and 2012 Trophée Eric Bompard. They repeated as bronze medalists at the 2013 Russian Championships.

=== 2013–2014 season ===
Riazanova/Tkachenko finished fourth at their two Grand Prix events, the 2013 Skate Canada International and the 2013 Rostelecom Cup. They then finished fourth at the 2014 Russian Championships behind Victoria Sinitsina / Ruslan Zhiganshin. In April 2014, Tkachenko left the partnership.

=== 2014–2015 season ===
Tkachenko and Isabella Tobias teamed up in the summer of 2014 to represent Israel. They had skated together for six months in 2008. On their decision regarding which country to represent, Tobias stated: "The U.S. would have granted him citizenship one year too late at best; Russia wanted me to give away my American passport, which I would never do; and the experts we consulted assured (us) that Lithuania would never grant him citizenship (I barely got mine). So we chose Israel, as I am of Jewish origin, and Ilia has also some Jewish roots via his family, which makes it easier." The two sat out the 2014–2015 season in order to become eligible to compete for the following season.

=== 2015–2016 season: Debut of Tobias/Tkachenko ===
Tobias/Tkachenko began the season on the Challenger Series (CS), winning silver medals at the Finlandia Trophy and Mordovian Ornament. They placed 10th at the 2016 European Championships in Bratislava, Slovakia, and 12th at the 2016 World Championships in Boston, United States. They were coached by Igor Shpilband and Adrienne Lenda in Novi, Michigan.

=== 2016–2017 season ===
Tobias/Tkachenko ranked 4th at the 2016 CS Autumn Classic International in Canada before making their Grand Prix debut as a team. After placing 6th at the 2016 Skate America and 5th at the 2016 Trophée de France, they won silver behind Elena Ilinykh / Ruslan Zhiganshin at the 2016 CS Tallinn Trophy.

The two placed 12th at the 2017 World Championships in Helsinki, Finland. Due to their result, Israel qualified a spot in the ice dancing event at the 2018 Winter Olympics in Pyeongchang, South Korea. They were coached by Shpilband and Lenda in Novi, Michigan.

On 12 April 2017, Tobias/Tkachenko announced a coaching change, having decided to join Marina Zoueva, Oleg Epstein, Massimo Scali, and Johnny Johns at the Arctic Edge in Canton, Michigan.

=== 2017–2018 season ===
Tobias/Tkachenko withdrew from both of their Grand Prix assignments – the 2017 NHK Trophy and 2017 Skate America. Due to Tkachenko's unsuccessful application for Israeli citizenship, they were not included in Israel's team to the 2018 Winter Olympics.

=== Post-competitive career ===
In January 2019, Tkachenko moved to Estero, Florida, to coach at the Hertz Arena's International Skating Academy.

== Programs ==
=== With Tobias ===
Season	Short dance	Free dance	Exhibition
2017–2018	Shape of You by Ed Sheeran; She Will Be Loved from Rhythms del Mundo; Fireball by Pitbull	Samson et Delilah by Camille Saint-Saëns	
2016–2017	Blues: Real Life; Hip hop: Can't Feel My Face by The Weeknd	Pas de deux (from The Nutcracker) by Pyotr Ilyich Tchaikovsky	Earned It by The Weeknd
2015–2016	Waltz: A Dream Is a Wish Your Heart Makes (from Cinderella) performed by Lily James; Polka: Cinderella by Patrick Doyle; March: Bibbidi-Bobbidi-Boo (from Cinderella) performed by Helena Bonham Carter	Polovtsian Dances by Alexander Borodin	

=== With Riazanova ===
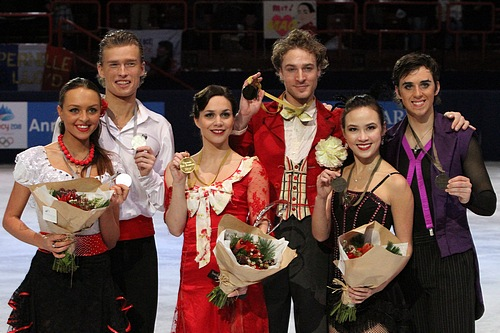
Riazanova and Tkachenko at the 2010 Trophee Eric Bompard

Season	Short dance	Free dance	Exhibition
2013–2014	Chicago by John Kander	The Phantom of the Opera by Andrew Lloyd Webber	Hey You by Pink Floyd
2012–2013	My Fair Lady by Frederick Loewe; I Could Have Danced All Night; With a Little Bit of Luck	The Godfather by Nino Rota	Hey You by Pink Floyd
2011–2012	Paxi Ni Ngongo by Bonga; Cuba	Romance (from The Blizzard) by Georgy Sviridov choreo. by Sergei Petukhov	
2010–2011	Waltz (from The Blizzard) by Georgy Sviridov	Danzón No. 2 by Arturo Márquez	The Master and Margarita by Igor Kornelyuk
	Original dance		
2009–2010	Berezka	The Master and Margarita by Igor Kornelyuk	

=== With Monko ===
Season	Original dance	Free dance	Exhibition
2007–2008	I'm Going Out on the Street (Russian: Вдоль по улице)	Song of the Spirit by Karl Jenkins	
2006–2007	Tango Passion by Astor Piazzolla	Romeo and Juliet (soundtrack)	

=== With Gorshkova ===
Season	Original dance	Free dance
2005–2006	Baila Son	Cirque du Soleil by René Dupéré
2004–2005	Slow foxtrot: Why Don't You Do Right? (from Who Framed Roger Rabbit); Quickstep: Give me that thing	Selection from Kill Bill; Bang, Bang (from Kill Bill); Hu Ha

== Competitive highlights ==
GP: Grand Prix; CS: Challenger Series; JGP: Junior Grand Prix

=== With Tobias for Israel ===
International
Event	2015–16	2016–17	2017–18
World Champ.	12th	12th	
European Champ.	10th	4th	
GP NHK Trophy			WD
GP Skate America		6th	WD
GP Trophée de France		5th	
CS Autumn Classic		4th	
CS Finlandia Trophy	2nd		
CS Mordovian Ornament	2nd		
CS Tallinn Trophy	1st	2nd	
Lake Placid IDI	1st		

=== With Riazanova ===
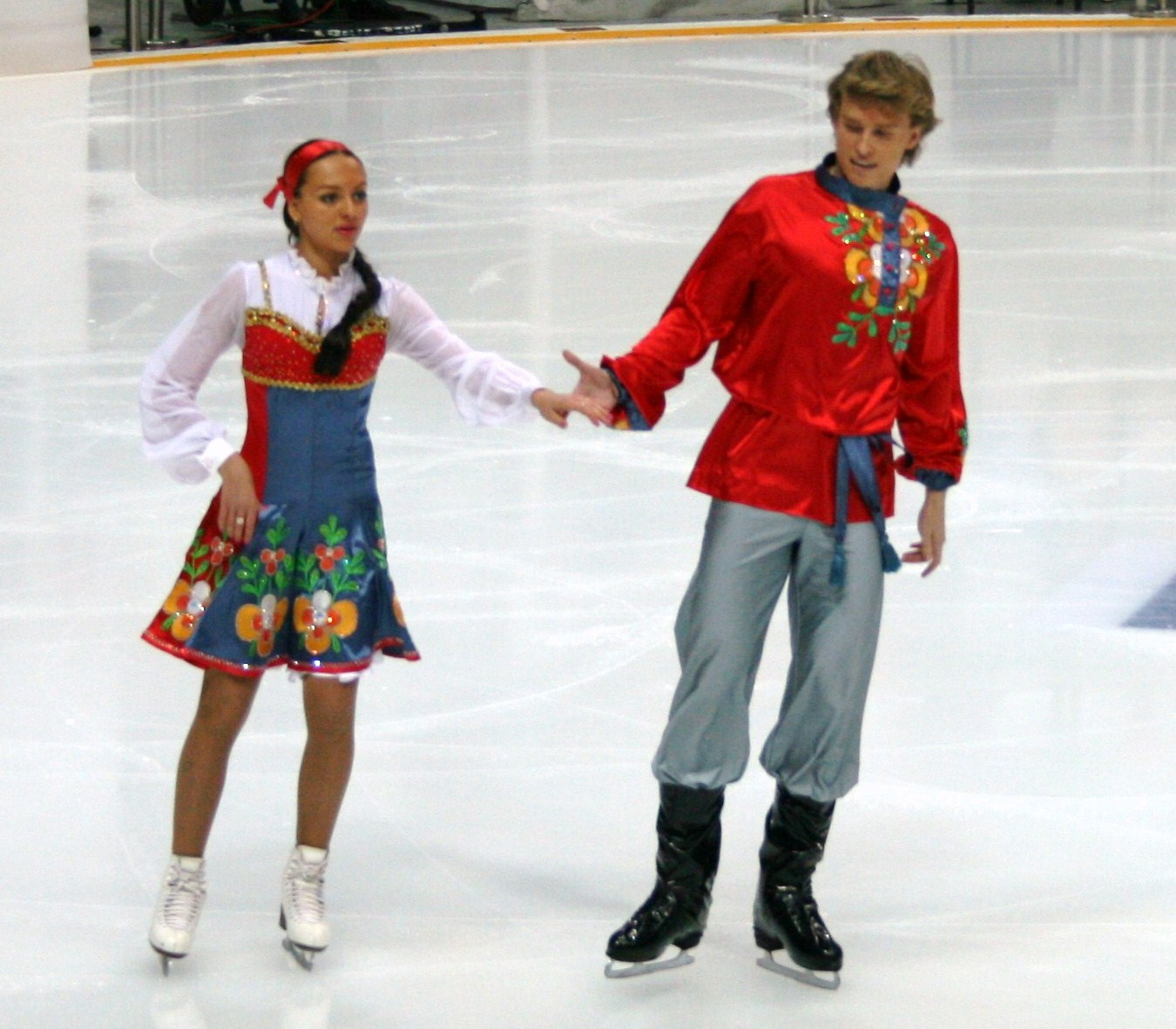
Riazanova and Tkachenko at 2009 Cup of Russia

International
Event	09–10	10–11	11–12	12–13	13–14
World Champ.			9th	11th	
European Champ.		6th	5th	4th	5th
GP Bompard		2nd		3rd	
GP Rostelecom Cup	6th		4th		4th
GP Skate America		5th			
GP Skate Canada			5th	3rd	4th
Golden Spin	2nd			1st	
Nebelhorn Trophy	4th	3rd			
National
Russian Champ.	4th	2nd	3rd	3rd	4th

=== With Monko ===
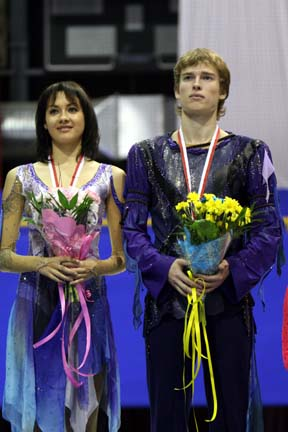
Monko and Tkachenko at the 2007–08 JGP Final

International
Event	2006–07	2007–08	2008–09
GP Skate America			WD
GP Trophée Bompard			WD
International: Junior
World Junior Champ.	5th	4th	
JGP Final		1st	
JGP Austria		2nd	
JGP United Kingdom		1st	
National
Russian Junior Champ.	2nd	2nd	

=== With Gorshkova ===
International: Junior
Event	2004–05	2005–06
World Junior Champ.	3rd	7th
JGP Final	5th	5th
JGP Estonia		1st
JGP Poland		1st
JGP Serbia	2nd	
JGP United States	3rd	
National
Russian Junior Champ.	2nd	2nd
