= Alexander Gamelin =

American-Korean ice dancer (born 1993)

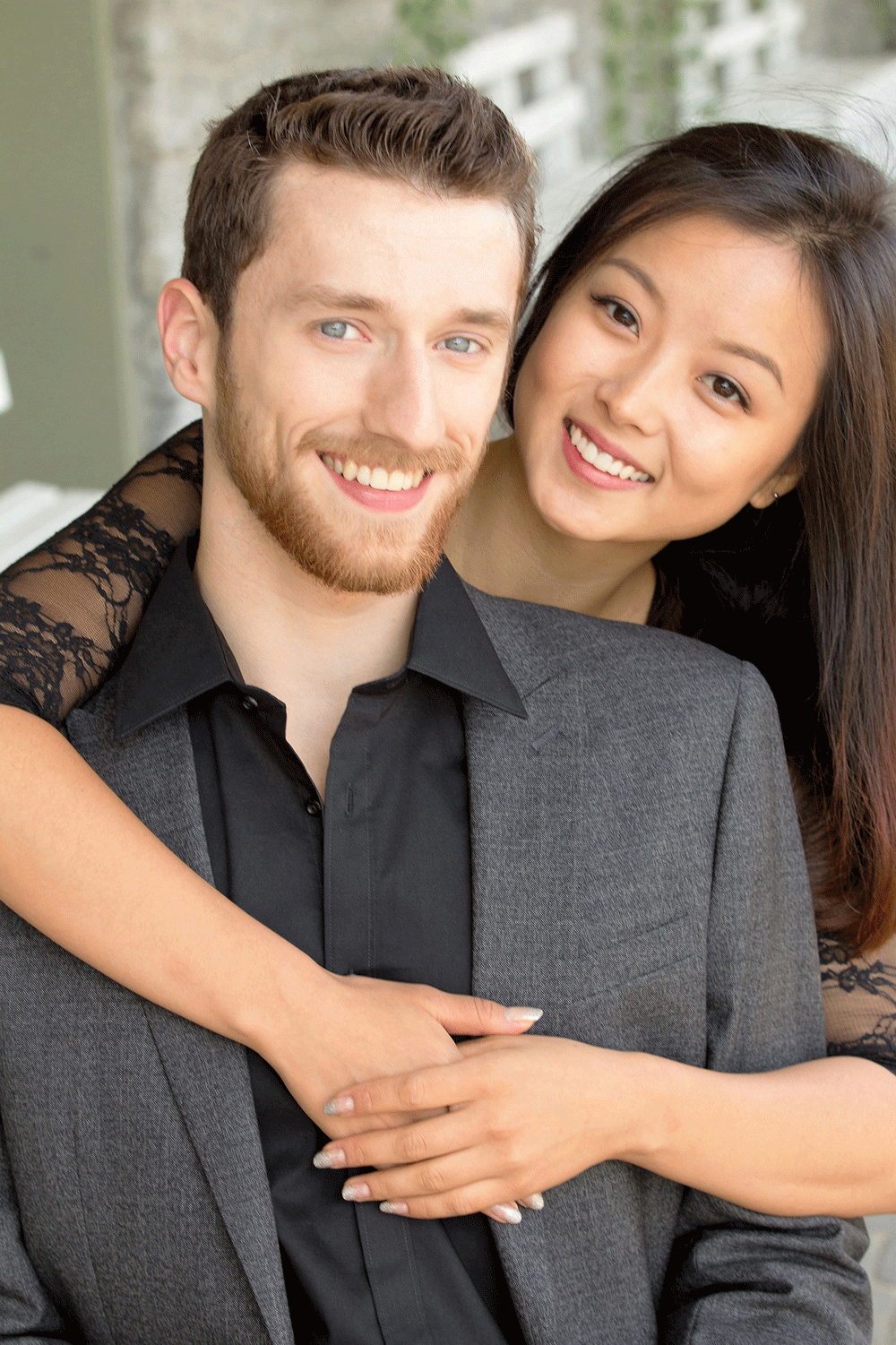
- Alexander Gamelin and Yura Min

Personal information
- Born: February 22, 1993 (age 33) Boston, Massachusetts, U.S.
- Height: 5 ft 11 in (1.80 m)

Figure skating career
- Country: (South Korea) Republic of Korea
- Coach: Igor Shpilband, Fabian Bourzat, Greg Zuerlein, Adrienne Lenda
- Skating club: Skating Club of New York
- Began skating: 2000

Alexander Gamelin (born February 22, 1993) is an American-born South Korean–representing ice dancer. He competed from the 2004–05 through the 2014–15 season with his twin sister, Danielle Gamelin. The two won the gold medal in senior dance at the 2015 U.S. Eastern Sectionals and placed seventh at the 2015 U.S. Championships. After his sister's retirement from competitive figure skating in April 2015, he teamed up with Yura Min to represent Republic of Korea. Min was born in the United States and maintains dual citizenship of the United States and the Republic of Korea. They are the 2017 and 2018 South Korean National Ice Dance Champions. Representing the Republic of Korea, Alexander and Yura competed in the 2018 Pyeongchang Winter Olympics where they finished in 18th place. The ice dance partnership between Alexander Gamelin and Yura Min ended in June 2018.

== Personal life ==
Alexander Gamelin and his twin sister, Danielle, were born on February 22, 1993, in Boston, Massachusetts. In 1998, along with his family, he moved to Merrick, New York, where he attended public elementary and middle school. In 2010, he relocated to Newark, Delaware, where he attended the American School, an accredited distance learning high school, from which he graduated in 2013 with high honors.

In May 2014, Gamelin moved to Novi, Michigan. He is a Phi Theta Kappa Honor Society college student, majoring in linguistics and foreign languages.

Gamelin was granted South Korean citizenship in July 2017, and now lives in Incheon, South Korea.

== Partnership with Danielle Gamelin for the United States ==
Gamelin's interest in ice dance emerged at the age of 3 when, with his twin sister, he watched a television broadcast of the 1996 World Figure Skating Championships ice dance event. The interest then blossomed in 2000, when at the age of seven, he and his sister began the U.S. Figure Skating Basic Skills Program in Merrick, New York.

In 2003, the Gamelins started taking private ice dance lessons from the husband-and-wife coaching team of Alexander Esman and Marina Koulbitskaya. The Gamelins started competing as a juvenile dance team in 2005. In the 2006–07 season, the Gamelins won the gold medal in juvenile dance at the 2007 North Atlantic Regional Ice Dance Championships and finished 9th at the 2007 U.S. Junior Figure Skating Championships. While Esman remained the principle coach throughout the duo's juvenile, intermediate and novice dance career, Evgeny Platov choreographed their programs and provided additional coaching. The Gamelins won the gold medal in juvenile dance at both the 2008 North Atlantic Regionals and the 2008 U.S. Eastern Sectionals and the bronze medal at the 2008 U.S. Junior Championships.

The following season, skating on the intermediate level, the Gamelins won the silver medal at the 2009 Eastern Sectionals and gold at the 2009 U.S. Junior Championships. Shortly after that, the New York State Senate together with the New York State Assembly passed a resolution honoring both for inspiring young people in the State of New York through their work ethic and commitment to excellence. During this and the previous season, the Gamelin twins incorporated a unique choreographic feature into their programs, an inverted eagle, which became known as the "Gamelin Eagle" and the team's signature move.

The Gamelin twins advanced to the novice level the following season. They won the silver medal in novice dance at the 2010 U.S. Eastern Sectional Figure Skating Championships and finished 5th at the 2010 U.S. Championships. During this period, the Gamelins performed as apprentices in the New Works and Young Artist Series with the Ice Theatre of New York (ITNY) and were part of the ITNY Outreach Program. They were recognized by U.S. Figure Skating as 2010 Athlete Ambassadors.

At the start of the 2010–11 season, the Gamelins relocated to Newark, Delaware to train at the University of Delaware's High-Performance Figure Skating Center under Christie Moxley-Hutson, Karen Ludington, and Alexandr Kirsanov. They finished 16th at the ISU Junior Grand Prix in Germany in Dresden. At home, they won the bronze medal in junior dance the 2011 U.S.Eastern Sectional Figure Skating Championships and finished 7th at the 2011 U.S. Figure Skating Championships.

Early in the 2011–12 season, the Gamelins finished 9th at the 2012 ISU Junior Grand Prix in Latvia, 4th at the 2012 Eastern Sectionals and in 12th at the 2012 U.S. Championships. Ahead of their first senior season, 2012–13, the Gamelins relocated to Silver Spring, Maryland to train at the Wheaton Skating Academy with Alexei Kiliakov and Elena Novak. They finished 4th at Eastern Sectionals and 11th at the U.S. Championships. Remaining with Kiliakov for their second season as seniors, the Gamelins won the bronze medal at the 2014 Eastern Sectionals and finished 12th at the 2014 U.S. Championships.

In May 2014, the Gamelins relocated to Novi, Michigan to train with a coaching team led by Igor Shpilband. Under the coaching team of Shpilband, Fabian Bourzat, Greg Zuerlein, and Adrienne Lenda, they won the gold medal in senior dance at the 2015 Eastern Sectionals and moved up five places from the previous season to finish in 7th place in Championship Dance at the 2015 U.S. Championships. In April 2015, the Gamelins ended their 15-year on-ice partnership.

== Partnership with Yura Min for South Korea ==
=== 2015–2016 season ===
In June 2015, Gamelin partnered with Yura Min to represent her home country, South Korea. They became friends while training under Igor Shpilband. They continued to train in Novi, Michigan under Shpilband, Fabian Bourzat, Greg Zuerlein, and Adrienne Lenda.

Min and Gamelin made their international debut in the fall of 2015 at four international events – the 2015 CS Ice Challenge (5th place), 2015 NRW Trophy (4th place), and 2015 CS Warsaw Cup (7th place) – before winning the silver medal behind Rebeka Kim and Kirill Minov at the 2016 South Korean Championships. They achieved both their ISU season's and personal best at the 2016 Four Continents Championships in Taipei, where they finished 8th of 16 teams, ending up as the top Korean dancers at the event.

=== 2016–2017 season ===
Starting their second competitive season together with an early event, the 2016 Lake Placid Ice Dance International, Min and Gamelin placed third in the short dance and second in the free dance, winning the bronze medal overall. The team finished in the top six for all three ISU Challenger Series competitions skated, the U.S. International Figure Skating Classic, the Nebelhorn Trophy, and the CS Tallinn Trophy, and made their ISU Grand Prix debut at Skate America finishing in 10th place. They advanced to Free Dance and placed 20th at 2017 World Figure Skating Championships in Helsinki. On the domestic front, Min and Gamelin earned the gold medal in senior dance at both the 2017 KSU President Cup Ranking Competition and the 2017 South Korean Figure Skating Championships.

=== 2017–2018 season ===
Min/Gamelin decided to skate to Arirang for their free dance. In September, they competed at the 2017 CS Nebelhorn Trophy, the final qualifying opportunity for the 2018 Winter Olympics. They finished fourth, earning a spot for South Korea in the Olympic ice dance event.

=== 2018-2019 season ===
On July 18, 2018, Gamelin announced his partnership with Min had ended.

== Programs ==
=== With Yura Min ===
Season	Short dance	Free dance	Exhibition
2017–18	Samba: Despacito by Luis Fonsi, Erika Ender, Daddy Yankee performed by Luis Fonsi; Rhumba: My All by Mariah Carey; Samba: Mujer Latina performed by Thalía	Arirang by 한돌 performed by Sohyang	Super Mario (OST); Arirang by 한돌 performed by Sohyang; Lollipop by Big Bang & 2NE1
2016–17	Blues: Your Heart Is As Black As Night by Beth Hart and Joe Bonamassa; Hip hop: I Am the Best X Bang Bang Bang by 2NE1 and Big Bang	Cinema Paradiso by Ennio Morricone: Cinema in Fiamme; Runaway, Search and Run; Love Theme for Nata	
2015–16	Cirque du Soleil: Waltz: Carrousel by Benoît Jutras; Polka: Balade au boit d'une echelle; Waltz: Carrousel by Benoît Jutras	The Beatles: Because; Get Back; Here Comes the Sun; The End	

=== With Danielle Gamelin ===
Season	Short dance	Free dance
2011–12	Cha Cha: Corazon Espinado by Santana; Samba: La vida es un carnaval by Casa Musica	Csardas by Monti
2010–11	Keep Holding On by Avril Lavigne	Smooth by Santana
2009–10		Lacrymosa by Wolfgang Amadeus Mozart performed by Evanescence and the National Chamber Opera of Australia
2008–09		King Arthur

== Competitive highlights ==
GP: Grand Prix; CS: Challenger Series; JGP: Junior Grand Prix

=== With Yura Min for South Korea ===
International
Event	2015–16	2016–17	2017–18	2018-19
Olympics			18th	
Worlds		20th	21st	
Four Continents	8th	8th	7th	
GP Skate America		10th		WD
CS Ice Challenge	5th			
CS Ice Star			5th	
CS Nebelhorn Trophy		6th	4th	
CS Ondrej Nepela			4th	
CS Tallinn Trophy		5th		
CS U.S. Classic		6th		
CS Warsaw Cup	7th			
NRW Trophy	4th			
Lake Placid IDI		3rd		
National
South Korean Champ.	2nd	1st	1st	
Team events
Olympics			9th T 9th P	

=== With Danielle Gamelin for the United States ===
International
Event	10–11	11–12	12–13	13–14	14–15
JGP Germany	16th				
JGP Latvia		9th			
National
U.S. Champ.	7th J	12th J	11th	12th	7th
