= 2017–18 ISU Challenger Series =

- Type: ISU Challenger Series
- Date: September 13 – December 9, 2017
- Season: 2017–18
- Previous: 2016–17 ISU Challenger Series
- Next: 2018–19 ISU Challenger Series

The 2017–18 ISU Challenger Series was held from September to December 2017. It was the fourth season that the ISU Challenger Series, a group of senior-level international figure skating competitions, was held.

== Competitions ==
This season, the series included the following events.

Date	Event	Location	Results
September 13–17	(United States) 2017 U.S. International Classic	Salt Lake City, Utah, United States	Details
September 14–17	(Italy) 2017 Lombardia Trophy	Bergamo, Italy	Details
September 20–23	(Canada) 2017 Autumn Classic International	Montreal, Quebec, Canada	Details
September 21–23	(Slovakia) 2017 Ondrej Nepela Trophy	Bratislava, Slovakia	Details
September 27–30	(Germany) 2017 Nebelhorn Trophy	Oberstdorf, Germany	Details
October 6–8	(Finland) 2017 Finlandia Trophy	Espoo, Finland	Details
October 27–29	(Belarus) 2017 Minsk-Arena Ice Star	Minsk, Belarus	Details
November 16–19	(Poland) 2017 Warsaw Cup	Warsaw, Poland	Details
November 21–26	(Estonia) 2017 Tallinn Trophy	Tallinn, Estonia	Details
December 6–9	(Croatia) 2017 Golden Spin of Zagreb	Zagreb, Croatia	Details

== Medal summary ==
=== Men's singles ===
Competition	Gold	Silver	Bronze	Results
(United States) U.S. International Classic	(United States) Nathan Chen	(United States) Max Aaron	(Canada) Liam Firus	Details
(Italy) Lombardia Trophy	(Japan) Shoma Uno	(United States) Jason Brown	(Australia) Brendan Kerry	Details
(Canada) Autumn Classic International	(Spain) Javier Fernández	(Japan) Yuzuru Hanyu	(Canada) Keegan Messing	Details
(Slovakia) Ondrej Nepela Trophy	(Russia) Mikhail Kolyada	(Russia) Sergei Voronov	(Australia) Brendan Kerry	Details
(Germany) Nebelhorn Trophy	(Belgium) Jorik Hendrickx	(United States) Alexander Johnson	(Sweden) Alexander Majorov	Details
(Finland) Finlandia Trophy	(China) Jin Boyang	(United States) Vincent Zhou	(United States) Adam Rippon	Details
(Belarus) Minsk-Arena Ice Star	(Russia) Sergei Voronov	(Georgia (country)) Moris Kvitelashvili	(Israel) Daniel Samohin	Details
(Poland) Warsaw Cup	(Italy) Matteo Rizzo	(Switzerland) Stéphane Walker	(Canada) Liam Firus	Details
(Estonia) Tallinn Trophy	(Russia) Dmitri Aliev	(United States) Alexei Krasnozhon	(Ukraine) Yaroslav Paniot	Details
(Croatia) Golden Spin of Zagreb	(Georgia (country)) Moris Kvitelashvili	(Israel) Oleksii Bychenko	(Russia) Artur Dmitriev, Jr.	Details

=== Ladies' singles ===
Competition	Gold	Silver	Bronze	Results
(United States) U.S. International Classic	(Japan) Marin Honda	(United States) Mirai Nagasu	(United States) Karen Chen	Details
(Italy) Lombardia Trophy	(Russia) Alina Zagitova	(Japan) Wakaba Higuchi	(Italy) Carolina Kostner	Details
(Canada) Autumn Classic International	(Canada) Kaetlyn Osmond	(Japan) Mai Mihara	(Kazakhstan) Elizabet Tursynbaeva	Details
(Slovakia) Ondrej Nepela Trophy	(Russia) Evgenia Medvedeva	(Japan) Rika Hongo	(Russia) Elena Radionova	Details
(Germany) Nebelhorn Trophy	(Australia) Kailani Craine	(Sweden) Matilda Algotsson	(Switzerland) Alexia Paganini	Details
(Finland) Finlandia Trophy	(Russia) Maria Sotskova	(Italy) Carolina Kostner	(Russia) Elizaveta Tuktamysheva	Details
(Belarus) Minsk-Arena Ice Star	(Kazakhstan) Elizabet Tursynbaeva	(Russia) Serafima Sakhanovich	(South Korea) An So-hyun	Details
(Poland) Warsaw Cup	(Russia) Serafima Sakhanovich	(Russia) Stanislava Konstantinova	(United States) Courtney Hicks	Details
(Estonia) Tallinn Trophy	(Russia) Stanislava Konstantinova	(Russia) Alisa Fedichkina	(Germany) Nicole Schott	Details
(Croatia) Golden Spin of Zagreb	(Russia) Stanislava Konstantinova	(Russia) Alisa Fedichkina	(Russia) Elizaveta Tuktamysheva	Details

=== Pairs ===
Competition	Gold	Silver	Bronze	Results
(United States) U.S. International Classic	(Canada) Kirsten Moore-Towers / Michael Marinaro	(United States) Alexa Scimeca Knierim / Chris Knierim	(United States) Chelsea Liu / Brian Johnson	Details
(Italy) Lombardia Trophy	(Russia) Natalia Zabiiako / Alexander Enbert	(Italy) Nicole Della Monica / Matteo Guarise	(Italy) Valentina Marchei / Ondřej Hotárek	Details
(Canada) Autumn Classic International	(France) Vanessa James / Morgan Ciprès	(Canada) Meagan Duhamel / Eric Radford	(Canada) Julianne Séguin / Charlie Bilodeau	Details
(Slovakia) Ondrej Nepela Trophy	(Russia) Natalia Zabiiako / Alexander Enbert	(Russia) Kristina Astakhova / Alexei Rogonov	(Russia) Alisa Efimova / Alexander Korovin	Details
(Germany) Nebelhorn Trophy	(Russia) Evgenia Tarasova / Vladimir Morozov	(Germany) Aliona Savchenko / Bruno Massot	(Australia) Ekaterina Alexandrovskaya / Harley Windsor	Details
(Finland) Finlandia Trophy	(China) Peng Cheng / Jin Yang	(Italy) Nicole Della Monica / Matteo Guarise	(Russia) Ksenia Stolbova / Fedor Klimov	Details
(Belarus) Minsk-Arena Ice Star	(Russia) Aleksandra Boikova / Dmitrii Kozlovskii	(Germany) Annika Hocke / Ruben Blommaert	(Israel) Paige Conners / Evgeni Krasnopolski	Details
(Poland) Warsaw Cup	(Italy) Valentina Marchei / Ondřej Hotárek	(Russia) Aleksandra Boikova / Dmitrii Kozlovskii	(Germany) Minerva Fabienne Hase / Nolan Seegert	Details
(Estonia) Tallinn Trophy	(Australia) Ekaterina Alexandrovskaya / Harley Windsor	(Russia) Alisa Efimova / Alexander Korovin	(Russia) Anastasia Poluianova / Dmitry Sopot	Details
(Croatia) Golden Spin of Zagreb	(Russia) Natalia Zabiiako / Alexander Enbert	(Russia) Kristina Astakhova / Alexei Rogonov	(United States) Tarah Kayne / Danny O'Shea	Details

=== Ice dance ===
Competition	Gold	Silver	Bronze	Results
(United States) U.S. International Classic	(United States) Madison Hubbell / Zachary Donohue	(United States) Kaitlin Hawayek / Jean-Luc Baker	(Japan) Kana Muramoto / Chris Reed	Details
(Italy) Lombardia Trophy	(Italy) Charlène Guignard / Marco Fabbri	(Russia) Alla Loboda / Pavel Drozd	(Ukraine) Oleksandra Nazarova / Maxim Nikitin	Details
(Canada) Autumn Classic International	(Canada) Tessa Virtue / Scott Moir	(Canada) Kaitlyn Weaver / Andrew Poje	(Canada) Piper Gilles / Paul Poirier	Details
(Slovakia) Ondrej Nepela Trophy	(Russia) Ekaterina Bobrova / Dmitri Soloviev	(United States) Rachel Parsons / Michael Parsons	(Russia) Betina Popova / Sergey Mozgov	Details
(Germany) Nebelhorn Trophy	(United Kingdom) Penny Coomes / Nicholas Buckland	(Japan) Kana Muramoto / Chris Reed	(Germany) Kavita Lorenz / Joti Polizoakis	Details
(Finland) Finlandia Trophy	(France) Gabriella Papadakis / Guillaume Cizeron	(Russia) Alexandra Stepanova / Ivan Bukin	(Denmark) Laurence Fournier Beaudry / Nikolaj Sørensen	Details
(Belarus) Minsk-Arena Ice Star	(Italy) Anna Cappellini / Luca Lanotte	(Russia) Tiffany Zahorski / Jonathan Guerreiro	(Russia) Victoria Sinitsina / Nikita Katsalapov	Details
(Poland) Warsaw Cup	(Russia) Betina Popova / Sergey Mozgov	(United States) Lorraine McNamara / Quinn Carpenter	(Ukraine) Oleksandra Nazarova / Maxim Nikitin	Details
(Estonia) Tallinn Trophy	(Poland) Natalia Kaliszek / Maksym Spodyriev	(Turkey) Alisa Agafonova / Alper Uçar	(United States) Elliana Pogrebinsky / Alex Benoit	Details
(Croatia) Golden Spin of Zagreb	(Russia) Ekaterina Bobrova / Dmitri Soloviev	(Italy) Charlène Guignard / Marco Fabbri	(United States) Kaitlin Hawayek / Jean-Luc Baker	Details

== Medal standings ==
Rank	Nation	Gold	Silver	Bronze	Total
1	Russia (RUS)	17	12	9	38
2	Italy (ITA)	4	4	2	10
3	Canada (CAN)	3	2	5	10
4	United States (USA)	2	10	7	19
5	Japan (JPN)	2	5	1	8
6	Australia (AUS)	2	0	3	5
7	China (CHN)	2	0	0	2
7	France (FRA)	2	0	0	2
9	Georgia (GEO)	1	1	0	2
10	Kazakhstan (KAZ)	1	0	1	2
11	Belgium (BEL)	1	0	0	1
11	Great Britain (GBR)	1	0	0	1
11	Poland (POL)	1	0	0	1
11	Spain (ESP)	1	0	0	1
15	Germany (GER)	0	2	3	5
16	Israel (ISR)	0	1	2	3
17	Sweden (SWE)	0	1	1	2
17	Switzerland (SUI)	0	1	1	2
19	Turkey (TUR)	0	1	0	1
20	Ukraine (UKR)	0	0	3	3
21	Denmark (DEN)	0	0	1	1
21	South Korea (KOR)	0	0	1	1
Totals (22 entries)		40	40	40	120

== Challenger Series rankings ==
The ISU Challenger Series rankings were formed by combining the two highest final scores of each skater or team.

=== Men's singles ===
No.	Skater	Nation	First event	Score	Second event	Score	Total score
1	Mikhail Kolyada	Russia	Ondrej Nepela Trophy	247.81	Finlandia Trophy	248.50	496.31
2	Sergei Voronov	Russia	Ondrej Nepela Trophy	234.07	Minsk-Arena Ice Star	250.10	484.17
3	Moris Kvitelashvili	Georgia	Minsk-Arena Ice Star	227.31	Golden Spin of Zagreb	236.67	463.98
4	Matteo Rizzo	Italy	Lombardia Trophy	227.02	Warsaw Cup	232.98	460.00
5	Yaroslav Paniot	Ukraine	U.S. International Classic	233.16	Tallinn Trophy	221.23	454.39

=== Ladies' singles ===
No.	Skater	Nation	First event	Score	Second event	Score	Total score
1	Carolina Kostner	Italy	Lombardia Trophy	198.36	Finlandia Trophy	193.76	392.12
2	Stanislava Konstantinova	Russia	Tallinn Trophy	190.75	Golden Spin of Zagreb	199.68	390.43
3	Elizaveta Tuktamysheva	Russia	Lombardia Trophy	184.75	Finlandia Trophy	189.13	373.88
4	Elizabet Tursynbaeva	Kazakhstan	Autumn Classic International	181.00	Minsk-Arena Ice Star	187.57	368.57
5	Alisa Fedichkina	Russia	Tallinn Trophy	180.33	Golden Spin of Zagreb	178.20	358.53

=== Pairs ===
No.	Team	Nation	First event	Score	Second event	Score	Total score
1	Natalia Zabiiako / Alexander Enbert	Russia	Lombardia Trophy	196.06	Golden Spin of Zagreb	202.96	399.02
2	Nicole Della Monica / Matteo Guarise	Italy	Lombardia Trophy	191.39	Finlandia Trophy	193.50	384.89
3	Kristina Astakhova / Alexei Rogonov	Russia	Ondrej Nepela Trophy	191.12	Golden Spin of Zagreb	186.62	377.74
4	Valentina Marchei / Ondřej Hotárek	Italy	Lombardia Trophy	180.86	Warsaw Cup	193.14	374.00
5	Aleksandra Boikova / Dmitrii Kozlovskii	Russia	Minsk-Arena Ice Star	191.58	Warsaw Cup	180.84	372.42

=== Ice dance ===
No.	Team	Nation	First event	Score	Second event	Score	Total score
1	Ekaterina Bobrova / Dmitri Soloviev	Russia	Ondrej Nepela Trophy	181.92	Golden Spin of Zagreb	186.66	368.58
2	Charlène Guignard / Marco Fabbri	Italy	Lombardia Trophy	169.30	Golden Spin of Zagreb	178.16	347.46
3	Tiffany Zahorski / Jonathan Guerreiro	Russia	Minsk-Arena Ice Star	169.81	Golden Spin of Zagreb	157.84	327.65
4	Betina Popova / Sergey Mozgov	Russia	Ondrej Nepela Trophy	161.92	Warsaw Cup	164.07	325.99
5	Kaitlin Hawayek / Jean-Luc Baker	United States	U.S. International Classic	153.55	Golden Spin of Zagreb	163.88	317.43

== Top scores ==
=== Men's singles ===
Top 10 best scores in the men's combined total
No.	Skater	Nation	Score	Event
1	Shoma Uno	Japan	319.84	2017 Lombardia Trophy
2	Javier Fernández	Spain	279.07	2017 Autumn Classic International
3	Nathan Chen	United States	275.04	2017 U.S. International Classic
4	Yuzuru Hanyu	Japan	268.24	2017 Autumn Classic International
5	Max Aaron	United States	261.56	2017 U.S. International Classic
6	Jason Brown	United States	259.88	2017 Lombardia Trophy
7	Jorik Hendrickx	Belgium	253.06	2017 Nebelhorn Trophy
8	Jin Boyang	China	252.60	2017 Finlandia Trophy
9	Sergei Voronov	Russia	250.10	2017 Minsk-Arena Ice Star
10	Vincent Zhou	United States	250.01	2017 Finlandia Trophy

=== Ladies' singles ===
Top 10 best scores in the ladies' combined total
No.	Skater	Nation	Score	Event
1	Evgenia Medvedeva	Russia	226.72	2017 Ondrej Nepela Trophy
2	Alina Zagitova	Russia	218.46	2017 Lombardia Trophy
3	Wakaba Higuchi	Japan	217.63	2017 Lombardia Trophy
4	Kaetlyn Osmond	Canada	217.55	2017 Autumn Classic International
5	Maria Sotskova	Russia	205.30	2017 Finlandia Trophy
6	Stanislava Konstantinova	Russia	199.68	2017 Golden Spin of Zagreb
7	Mai Mihara	Japan	199.02	2017 Autumn Classic International
8	Marin Honda	Japan	198.42	2017 U.S. International Classic
9	Carolina Kostner	Italy	198.36	2017 Lombardia Trophy
10	Bradie Tennell	United States	196.70	2017 Lombardia Trophy

=== Pairs ===
Top 10 best scores in the pairs' combined total
No.	Team	Nation	Score	Event
1	Evgenia Tarasova / Vladimir Morozov	Russia	218.46	2017 Nebelhorn Trophy
2	Aliona Savchenko / Bruno Massot	Germany	211.08	2017 Nebelhorn Trophy
3	Vanessa James / Morgan Ciprès	France	210.48	2017 Autumn Classic International
4	Meagan Duhamel / Eric Radford	Canada	202.98	2017 Autumn Classic International
5	Natalia Zabiiako / Alexander Enbert	Russia	202.96	2017 Golden Spin of Zagreb
6	Peng Cheng / Jin Yang	China	198.03	2017 Finlandia Trophy
7	Nicole Della Monica / Matteo Guarise	Italy	193.50	2017 Finlandia Trophy
8	Valentina Marchei / Ondřej Hotárek	Italy	193.14	2017 Warsaw Cup
9	Aleksandra Boikova / Dmitrii Kozlovskii	Russia	191.58	2017 Minsk-Arena Ice Star
10	Kristina Astakhova / Alexei Rogonov	Russia	191.12	2017 Ondrej Nepela Trophy

=== Ice dance ===
Top 10 best scores in the combined total (ice dance)
No.	Team	Nation	Score	Event
1	Tessa Virtue / Scott Moir	Canada	195.76	2017 Autumn Classic International
2	Gabriella Papadakis / Guillaume Cizeron	France	188.25	2017 Finlandia Trophy
3	Ekaterina Bobrova / Dmitri Soloviev	Russia	186.66	2017 Golden Spin of Zagreb
4	Anna Cappellini / Luca Lanotte	Italy	183.49	2017 Minsk-Arena Ice Star
5	Madison Hubbell / Zachary Donohue	United States	178.80	2017 U.S. International Classic
6	Charlène Guignard / Marco Fabbri	Italy	178.16	2017 Golden Spin of Zagreb
7	Penny Coomes / Nicholas Buckland	Great Britain	177.13	2017 Nebelhorn Trophy
8	Kaitlyn Weaver / Andrew Poje	Canada	173.56	2017 Autumn Classic International
9	Piper Gilles / Paul Poirier	Canada	172.26	2017 Autumn Classic International
10	Tiffany Zahorski / Jonathan Guerreiro	Russia	169.81	2017 Minsk-Arena Ice Star
