= 2017 CS Warsaw Cup =

- Type: ISU Challenger Series
- Date: 16 – 19 November 2017
- Season: 2017–18
- Location: Warsaw, Poland
- Host: Polish Figure Skating Association

Champions
- Men's singles: (Italy) Matteo Rizzo
- Ladies' singles: (Russia) Serafima Sakhanovich
- Pairs: (Italy) Valentina Marchei / Ondřej Hotárek
- Ice dance: (Russia) Betina Popova / Sergey Mozgov
- Previous: 2017 CS Minsk-Arena Ice Star
- Next: 2017 CS Tallinn Trophy

The 2017 CS Warsaw Cup was a senior international figure skating competition, held in November 2017 in Warsaw, Poland. It was part of the 2017–18 ISU Challenger Series. Medals were awarded in the disciplines of men's singles, ladies' singles, pair skating, and ice dance.

== Entries ==
The International Skating Union published the full preliminary list of entries on 23 October 2017.

Country	Men	Ladies	Pairs	Ice dance
Australia	Mark Webster			Kimberley Hew-Low / Timothy McKernan; Chantelle Kerry / Andrew Dodds
Belarus				Anna Kublikova / Yuri Hulitski
Canada	Liam Firus	Emy Decelles		Sarah Arnold / Thomas Williams; Molly Lanaghan / Dmitre Razgulajevs
Chinese Taipei		Amy Lin		
Czech Republic	Jan Kurník	Aneta Janiczková; Elizaveta Ukolova		
France		Héloïse Pitot		
Germany	Paul Fentz		Minerva Fabienne Hase / Nolan Seegert; Annika Hocke / Ruben Blommaert	Katharina Müller / Tim Dieck
Hong Kong	Leslie Man Cheuk Ip			
Hungary	Alexander Maszljanko	Fruzsina Medgyesi		
Israel		Michelle Lifshits; Elena Rivkina		
Italy	Adrien Bannister; Matteo Rizzo		Rebecca Ghilardi / Filippo Ambrosini; Valentina Marchei / Ondřej Hotárek	
Kazakhstan	Abzal Rakimgaliev	Zhansaya Adykhanova		
Lithuania		Greta Morkyte		
Malaysia	Kai Xiang Chew			
Poland	Łukasz Kędzierski; Erik Matysiak; Igor Reznichenko	Elżbieta Gabryszak; Colette Coco Kaminski; Oliwia Rzepiel		Justyna Plutowska / Jérémie Flemin; Anastasia Polibina / Radoslaw Barszczak
Russia	Roman Savosin	Alexandra Avstriyskaya; Stanislava Konstantinova; Serafima Sakhanovich	Aleksandra Boikova / Dmitrii Kozlovskii	Betina Popova / Sergey Mozgov
Singapore		Ceciliane Mei Ling Hartmann		
Slovakia	Jakub Kršňák			
Spain			Laura Barquero / Aritz Maestu	
Sweden		Anita Östlund		
Switzerland	Lukas Britschgi; Stéphane Walker			
Turkey				Alisa Agafonova / Alper Ucar
Ukraine				Alexandra Nazarova / Maxim Nikitin
Great Britain	Harry Mattick	Nina Povey		Lilah Fear / Lewis Gibson; Robynne Tweedale / Joseph Buckland
United States	Andrew Torgashev	Courtney Hicks	Chelsea Liu / Brian Johnson; Jessica Pfund / Joshua Santillan	Lorraine McNamara / Quinn Carpenter

Withdrew before starting orders were drawn

- Ladies: Loena Hendrickx (BEL) - Roberta Rodeghiero (ITA) - Julie Froetscher (FRA) - Lutricia Bock (GER)
- Men: Elladj Balde (CAN) - Franz Streubel (GER)
- Ice Dance: Adelina Galayavieva / Laurent Abecassis (FRA) - Jasmine Tessari / Francesco Fioretti (ITA) - Sara Hurtado / Kirill Khaliavin (ESP)

== Results ==
=== Men ===
Rank	Name	Nation	Total	SP		FS	
1	Matteo Rizzo	Italy	232.98	1	75.64	1	157.34
2	Stéphane Walker	Switzerland	204.48	2	68.92	2	135.56
3	Liam Firus	Canada	200.71	3	66.58	3	134.13
4	Roman Savosin	Russia	197.15	4	64.93	4	132.22
5	Ihor Reznichenko	Poland	195.87	5	64.73	5	131.14
6	Andrew Torgashev	United States	182.78	6	61.52	6	121.26
7	Paul Fentz	Germany	180.84	9	60.18	7	120.66
8	Mark Webster	Australia	176.22	7	60.38	8	115.84
9	Adrien Bannister	Italy	174.10	10	58.65	9	115.45
10	Kai Xiang Chew	Malaysia	172.18	11	58.14	11	114.04
11	Harry Mattick	United Kingdom	171.93	8	60.28	13	111.65
12	Lukas Britschgi	Switzerland	171.81	13	57.51	10	114.30
13	Abzal Rakimgaliev	Kazakhstan	163.55	14	51.10	12	112.45
14	Jan Kurník	Czech Republic	155.48	12	57.90	14	97.58
15	Leslie Man Cheuk Ip	Hong Kong	143.94	15	50.18	16	93.76
16	Alexander Maszljanko	Hungary	136.85	19	41.38	15	95.47
17	Erik Matysiak	Poland	135.26	16	45.33	17	89.93
18	Łukasz Kędzierski	Poland	130.89	17	45.16	18	85.73
19	Jakub Kršňák	Slovakia	125.73	18	44.73	19	81.00

=== Ladies ===
Rank	Name	Nation	Total	SP		FS	
1	Serafima Sakhanovich	Russia	176.39	1	61.23	1	115.16
2	Stanislava Konstantinova	Russia	174.43	2	59.84	2	114.59
3	Courtney Hicks	United States	165.39	3	58.43	3	106.96
4	Nina Povey	United Kingdom	148.06	5	49.23	4	98.83
5	Anita Östlund	Sweden	146.29	4	52.11	5	94.18
6	Emy Decelles	Canada	136.47	6	48.69	6	87.78
7	Fruzsina Medgyesi	Hungary	132.79	8	46.79	7	86.00
8	Alexandra Avstriyskaya	Russia	129.20	9	45.90	8	83.30
9	Elżbieta Gabryszak	Poland	123.17	7	47.07	9	76.10
10	Héloïse Pitot	France	115.11	11	40.65	10	74.46
11	Greta Morkyte	Lithuania	108.38	10	41.21	12	67.17
12	Colette Coco Kaminski	Poland	107.48	14	39.25	11	68.23
13	Aneta Janiczková	Czech Republic	106.95	12	40.45	13	66.50
14	Oliwia Rzepiel	Poland	104.16	13	39.75	16	64.41
15	Elizaveta Ukolova	Czech Republic	102.65	15	36.83	15	65.82
16	Michelle Lifshits	Israel	98.61	17	32.68	14	65.93
17	Ceciliane Mei Ling Hartmann	Singapore	97.86	16	34.34	18	63.52
18	Amy Lin	Chinese Taipei	95.94	19	32.08	17	63.86
19	Zhansaya Adykhanova	Kazakhstan	86.54	18	32.10	19	54.44
20	Elena Rivkina	Israel	80.82	20	31.72	20	49.10

=== Pairs ===
Rank	Name	Nation	Total	SP		FS	
1	Valentina Marchei / Ondřej Hotárek	Italy	193.14	1	66.70	1	126.44
2	Aleksandra Boikova / Dmitrii Kozlovskii	Russia	180.84	4	58.52	2	122.32
3	Minerva Fabienne Hase / Nolan Seegert	Germany	167.72	2	59.92	3	107.80
4	Annika Hocke / Ruben Blommaert	Germany	161.95	3	58.84	4	103.11
5	Jessica Pfund / Joshua Santillan	United States	148.86	5	53.26	6	95.60
6	Chelsea Liu / Brian Johnson	United States	145.14	8	45.94	5	99.20
7	Laura Barquero / Aritz Maestu	Spain	143.26	6	49.96	7	93.30
8	Rebecca Ghilardi / Filippo Ambrosini	Italy	137.56	7	49.88	8	87.68

=== Ice dance ===
Rank	Name	Nation	Total	SD		FD	
1	Betina Popova / Sergey Mozgov	Russia	164.07	1	64.38	1	99.69
2	Lorraine McNamara / Quinn Carpenter	United States	160.51	2	62.53	2	97.98
3	Oleksandra Nazarova / Maxim Nikitin	Ukraine	151.30	3	61.82	5	89.48
4	Lilah Fear / Lewis Gibson	United Kingdom	150.46	4	60.40	4	90.06
5	Katharina Müller / Tim Dieck	Germany	150.14	6	59.65	3	90.49
6	Alisa Agafonova / Alper Uçar	Turkey	149.53	5	60.34	6	89.19
7	Robynne Tweedale / Joseph Buckland	United Kingdom	132.84	8	49.96	8	82.88
8	Sarah Arnold / Thomas Williams	Canada	132.10	9	46.55	7	85.55
9	Justyna Plutowska / Jérémie Flemin	Poland	129.85	7	54.68	9	75.17
10	Molly Lanaghan / Dmitre Razgulajevs	Canada	117.42	10	45.09	10	72.33
11	Anna Kublikova / Yuri Hulitski	Belarus	111.50	12	44.10	11	67.40
12	Anastasia Polibina / Radoslaw Barszczak	Poland	108.48	13	41.26	12	67.22
13	Chantelle Kerry / Andrew Dodds	Australia	103.06	11	44.61	13	58.45
14	Kimberley Hew-Low / Timothy McKernan	Australia	93.48	14	35.35	14	58.13
