= 2017 CS Tallinn Trophy =

International figure skating competition held in Tallinn

- Type: ISU Challenger Series
- Date: 21 – 26 November 2017
- Season: 2017–18
- Location: Tallinn, Estonia
- Host: Estonian Skating Union
- Venue: Tondiraba Ice Hall

Champions
- Men's singles: (Russia) Dmitri Aliev
- Ladies' singles: (Russia) Stanislava Konstantinova
- Pairs: (Australia) Ekaterina Alexandrovskaya / Harley Windsor
- Ice dance: (Poland) Natalia Kaliszek / Maksym Spodyriev
- Previous: 2017 CS Warsaw Cup
- Next: 2017 CS Golden Spin of Zagreb

The 2017 CS Tallinn Trophy was a senior international figure skating competition held on November 21–26, 2017, at the Tondiraba Ice Hall in Tallinn, Estonia. The senior categories were part of the 2017–18 ISU Challenger Series. Medals were awarded in men's singles, ladies' singles, pair skating, and ice dance.

== Entries ==
The International Skating Union published the full preliminary list of entries on 31 October 2017.

Country	Men	Ladies	Pairs	Ice dance
Armenia	Slavik Hayrapetyan			
Australia			Ekaterina Alexandrovskaya / Harley Windsor; Paris Stephens / Matthew Dodds	
Austria		Kerstin Frank; Lara Roth		
Belarus	Anton Karpuk	Katsiarina Pakhamovich; Alina Suponenko		
China	Yunda Lu	Ziquan Zhao		
Chinese Taipei	Meng Ju Lee	Amy Lin		
Croatia	Nicholas Vrdoljak			
Czech Republic	Jiří Bělohradský	Michaela Lucie Hanzlíková		
Estonia	Samuel Koppel; Daniel Albert Naurits; Aleksandr Selevko; Daniil Zurav	Johanna Allik; Calista Krass; Gerli Liinamäe; Kristina Škukuleta-Gromova; Annely Vahi		Katerina Bunina / German Frolov
Finland		Viveca Lindfors; Jenni Saarinen		Monica Lindfors / Juho Pirinen
France	Maxence Collet; Julian Donica	Alizée Crozet; Héloïse Pitot	Lola Esbrat / Andrei Novoselov; Coline Keriven / Antoine Pierre; Camille Mendoza / Pavel Kovalev	Lorenza Alessandrini / Pierre Souquet
Germany	Peter Liebers	Lea Johanna Dastich; Nicole Schott; Nathalie Weinzierl		Kavita Lorenz / Joti Polizoakis; Jennifer Urban / Benjamin Steffan
Hong Kong	Harrison Jon-Yen Wong			
Italy	Marco Zandron; Maurizio Zandron	Sara Conti		
Latvia		Angelīna Kučvaļska		
Lithuania				Guoste Damuleviciute / Deividas Kizala; Allison Reed / Saulius Ambrulevičius
Malaysia	Kai Xiang Chew; Julian Zhi Jie Yee			
Netherlands	Michel Tsiba			
Poland		Elżbieta Gabryszak; Oliwia Rzepiel		Natalia Kaliszek / Maksym Spodyriev; Anastasia Polibina / Radoslaw Barszczak
Russia	Dmitri Aliev; Makar Ignatov	Alexandra Avstriyskaya; Alisa Fedichkina; Stanislava Konstantinova	Alisa Efimova / Alexander Korovin; Anastasia Poluianova / Dmitry Sopot	Sofia Evdokimova / Egor Bazin; Ludmila Sosnitskaia / Pavel Golovishnokov
Serbia		Antonina Dubinina		
Singapore		Chloe Ing		
Switzerland		Yoonmi Lehmann		
Sweden		Matilda Algotsson; Natasja Remstedt		Malin Malmberg / Thomas Nordahl
Thailand	Micah Kai Lynette			
Turkey				Alisa Agafonova / Alper Uçar
Ukraine	Yaroslav Paniot	Anna Khnychenkova		Darya Popova / Volodymyr Byelikov
United States	Alexei Krasnozhon	Angela Wang; Caroline Zhang		Elliana Pogrebinsky / Alex Benoit

Withdrew before starting orders were drawn

- Men: Paul Fentz (GER), Thomas Stoll (GER), Thomas Kennes (NED), Mikhail Kolyada (RUS)
- Ladies: Pauline Wanner (FRA), Ivett Tóth (HUN), Niki Wories (NED), Anastasia Kononenko (UKR)
- Pairs: Liubov Efimenko / Matthew Penasse (FIN), Marissa Castelli / Mervin Tran (USA), Ioulia Chtchetinina / Mikhail Akulov (SUI)
- Ice dance: Adelina Galayavieva / Laurent Abecassis (FRA), Katjuscha Anna Alwart / Arturas Ganzela (LTU), Elena Ilinykh / Anton Shibnev (RUS), Robynne Tweedale / Joseph Buckland (UK)

Added

- Ice dance: Alisa Agafonova / Alper Uçar

== Results ==
=== Men ===
Rank	Name	Nation	Total	SP		FS	
1	Dmitri Aliev	Russia	235.10	2	80.88	1	154.22
2	Alexei Krasnozhon	United States	222.39	3	80.20	2	142.19
3	Yaroslav Paniot	Ukraine	221.23	1	81.25	3	139.98
4	Peter Liebers	Germany	210.28	4	74.14	5	136.14
5	Julian Zhi Jie Yee	Malaysia	202.62	9	63.70	4	138.92
6	Maurizio Zandron	Italy	201.29	6	70.20	8	131.09
7	Makar Ignatov	Russia	196.71	8	65.40	7	131.31
8	Slavik Hayrapetyan	Armenia	195.41	11	61.70	6	133.71
9	Aleksandr Selevko	Estonia	192.79	5	70.76	9	122.03
10	Daniel Albert Naurits	Estonia	186.83	7	70.01	11	116.82
11	Harrison Jon-Yen Wong	Hong Kong	182.60	12	61.10	10	121.50
12	Jiří Bělohradský	Czech Republic	180.76	13	60.24	11	120.52
13	Samuel Koppel	Estonia	173.03	10	63.07	14	109.96
14	Maxence Collet	France	168.88	15	59.59	15	109.29
15	Kai Xiang Chew	Malaysia	166.64	18	53.32	13	113.32
16	Nicholas Vrdoljak	Croatia	165.41	14	59.79	17	105.62
17	Anton Karpuk	Belarus	159.29	21	50.78	16	108.51
18	Micah Kai Lynette	Thailand	156.56	17	55.22	18	101.34
19	Yunda Lu	China	153.53	19	52.44	19	101.09
20	Julian Donica	France	149.86	20	51.25	20	98.61
21	Marco Zandron	Italy	138.63	16	58.79	23	79.84
22	Daniil Zurav	Estonia	128.35	23	43.95	22	84.40
23	Michel Tsiba	Netherlands	128.18	24	37.51	21	90.67
WD	Meng Ju Lee	Chinese Taipei	withdrew	22	48.65	withdrew from competition	

=== Ladies ===
Rank	Name	Nation	Total	SP		FS	
1	Stanislava Konstantinova	Russia	190.75	1	64.41	1	126.34
2	Alisa Fedichkina	Russia	180.33	2	63.42	2	116.91
3	Nicole Schott	Germany	171.53	5	57.68	4	113.85
4	Caroline Zhang	United States	170.82	6	56.35	3	114.47
5	Angela Wang	United States	160.04	3	62.50	11	97.54
6	Lea Johanna Dastich	Germany	155.60	13	50.65	5	104.95
7	Alexandra Avstriyskaya	Russia	153.30	14	50.43	6	102.87
8	Anna Khnychenkova	Ukraine	153.01	10	53.82	7	99.19
9	Amy Lin	Chinese Taipei	152.97	7	54.11	8	98.86
10	Viveca Lindfors	Finland	149.78	4	59.03	15	90.75
11	Ziquan Zhao	China	147.33	16	49.09	9	98.24
12	Kristina Škukuleta-Gromova	Estonia	144.79	21	46.56	10	98.23
13	Yoonmi Lehmann	Switzerland	143.37	11	52.22	14	91.15
14	Chloe Ing	Singapore	142.63	12	51.31	13	91.32
15	Sara Conti	Italy	141.17	17	48.26	12	92.91
16	Gerli Liinamäe	Estonia	138.91	15	50.29	17	88.62
17	Jenni Saarinen	Finland	138.75	9	53.87	19	84.88
18	Matilda Algotsson	Sweden	134.38	22	45.55	16	88.83
19	Alizée Crozet	France	133.15	23	45.42	18	87.73
20	Lara Roth	Austria	127.21	26	44.46	20	82.75
21	Annely Vahi	Estonia	126.95	18	48.15	21	78.80
22	Antonina Dubinina	Serbia	124.17	24	45.39	22	78.78
23	Michaela Lucie Hanzlíková	Czech Republic	123.58	19	47.77	25	75.81
24	Elżbieta Gabryszak	Poland	122.74	20	46.91	24	75.83
25	Johanna Allik	Estonia	120.48	28	43.91	23	76.57
26	Héloïse Pitot	France	118.88	25	44.69	26	74.19
27	Natasja Remstedt	Sweden	114.89	29	43.43	27	71.46
28	Oliwia Rzepiel	Poland	113.43	27	43.95	29	69.48
29	Calista Krass	Estonia	112.15	30	42.06	28	70.09
30	Angelīna Kučvaļska	Latvia	93.92	31	38.00	32	55.02
31	Alina Suponenko	Belarus	91.31	33	31.86	31	59.45
32	Katsiarina Pakhamovich	Belarus	90.51	34	30.43	30	60.08
WD	Nathalie Weinzierl	Germany	withdrew	8	53.95	withdrew from competition	
WD	Kerstin Frank	Austria	withdrew	32	37.97	withdrew from competition	

=== Pairs ===
Alexandrovskaya/Windsor won their first senior-level international title.

Rank	Name	Nation	Total	SP		FS	
1	Ekaterina Alexandrovskaya / Harley Windsor	Australia	178.90	1	66.40	1	112.50
2	Alisa Efimova / Alexander Korovin	Russia	162.62	2	64.58	3	98.04
3	Anastasia Poluianova / Dmitry Sopot	Russia	161.60	4	53.86	2	107.74
4	Lola Esbrat / Andrei Novoselov	France	154.86	3	59.66	4	95.20
5	Camille Mendoza / Pavel Kovalev	France	130.50	5	51.76	6	78.74
6	Coline Keriven / Antoine Pierre	France	120.06	6	39.24	5	80.82
7	Paris Stephens / Matthew Dodds	Australia	77.66	7	23.38	7	54.28

=== Ice dance ===
Rank	Name	Nation	Total	SD		FD	
1	Natalia Kaliszek / Maksym Spodyriev	Poland	168.58	1	67.94	1	100.64
2	Alisa Agafonova / Alper Uçar	Turkey	162.48	2	64.50	2	97.98
3	Elliana Pogrebinsky / Alex Benoit	United States	150.74	4	58.42	3	92.32
4	Sofia Evdokimova / Egor Bazin	Russia	150.28	3	59.88	4	90.40
5	Kavita Lorenz / Joti Polizoakis	Germany	145.20	5	56.04	5	89.16
6	Jennifer Urban / Benjamin Steffan	Germany	139.44	6	55.84	7	83.60
7	Ludmila Sosnitskaia / Pavel Golovishnokov	Russia	137.58	9	51.28	6	86.30
8	Allison Reed / Saulius Ambrulevičius	Lithuania	136.68	7	55.02	9	81.66
9	Darya Popova / Volodymyr Byelikov	Ukraine	136.06	8	53.40	8	82.66
10	Lorenza Alessandrini / Pierre Souquet	France	126.50	10	47.76	10	78.74
11	Guoste Damuleviciute / Deividas Kizala	Lithuania	111.74	11	43.88	12	67.86
12	Anastasia Polibina / Radoslaw Barszczak	Poland	109.82	14	39.10	11	70.72
13	Katerina Bunina / German Frolov	Estonia	108.18	12	43.86	14	64.32
14	Monica Lindfors / Juho Pirinen	Finland	107.58	13	42.22	13	65.36
15	Malin Malmberg / Thomas Nordahl	Sweden	84.64	15	33.30	15	51.34
