= 2017 CS Minsk-Arena Ice Star =

2017 Minsk-Arena Ice Star
- Type: ISU Challenger Series
- Date: 26 – 29 October 2017
- Season: 2017–18
- Location: Minsk, Belarus

Champions
- Men's singles: (Russia) Sergei Voronov
- Ladies' singles: (Kazakhstan) Elizabet Tursynbaeva
- Pairs: (Russia) Aleksandra Boikova / Dmitrii Kozlovskii
- Ice dance: (Italy) Anna Cappellini / Luca Lanotte
- Previous: 2017 CS Finlandia Trophy
- Next: 2017 CS Warsaw Cup

The 2017 CS Minsk-Arena Ice Star is a senior international figure skating competition to be held in October 2017 in Minsk, Belarus. It is part of the 2017–18 ISU Challenger Series. Medals will be awarded in the disciplines of men's singles, ladies' singles, pair skating, and ice dance.

== Entries ==
The International Skating Union published the full preliminary list of entries on 3 October 2017.

Country	Men	Ladies	Pairs	Ice dance
Belarus	Anton Karpuk; Yakau Zenko	Tatsiana Chornaya; Katsiarina Pakhamovich; Hanna Paroshyna; Maryia Saldakayeva		Viktoria Kavaliova / Yurii Bieliaiev; Anna Kublikova / Yuri Hulitski
Czech Republic	Jiří Bělohradský; Matyáš Bělohradský	Eliška Březinová; Michaela Lucie Hanzlíková		
Georgia	Moris Kvitelashvili			
Estonia		Johanna Allik		
Germany	Peter Liebers	Lutricia Bock; Nicole Schott	Minerva Fabienne Hase / Nolan Seegert; Annika Hocke / Ruben Blommaert	Shari Koch / Christian Nüchtern; Katharina Müller / Tim Dieck; Jennifer Urban / Benjamin Steffan
Hungary				Anna Yanovskaya / Ádám Lukács
Israel	Oleksii Bychenko; Daniel Samohin		Paige Conners / Evgeni Krasnopolski	Adel Tankova / Ronald Zilberberg
Italy	Ivan Righini; Maurizio Zandron			Anna Cappellini / Luca Lanotte
Kazakhstan		Elizabet Tursynbayeva		
Latvia		Angelīna Kučvaļska		
Lithuania		Elžbieta Kropa; Greta Morkytė		
Monaco	Davide Lewton Brain			
Poland	Ihor Reznichenko			Justyna Plutowska / Jeremie Flemin
South Korea	Byun Se-jong	An So-hyun; Kim Ha-nul		Yura Min / Alexander Gamelin
Russia	Makar Ignatov; Anton Shulepov; Sergei Voronov	Anastasia Gracheva; Serafima Sakhanovich	Aleksandra Boikova / Dmitrii Kozlovskii; Alina Ustimkina / Nikita Volodin	Victoria Sinitsina / Nikita Katsalapov; Vlada Solovieva / Yuri Vlasenko; Tiffany Zahorski / Jonathan Guerreiro
Spain				Sara Hurtado / Kirill Khaliavin
Sweden		Anita Östlund		
Switzerland		Yoonmi Lehmann	Ioulia Chtchetinina / Mikhail Akulov	
Ukraine	Ivan Pavlov	Anna Khnychenkova		Oleksandra Nazarova / Maxim Nikitin

== Results ==
=== Men ===
Rank	Name	Nation	Total	SP		FS	
1	Sergei Voronov	Russia	250.10	1	78.75	1	171.35
2	Moris Kvitelashvili	Georgia	227.31	2	78.28	3	149.03
3	Daniel Samohin	Israel	219.75	6	72.76	4	146.99
4	Ivan Righini	Italy	219.61	10	67.39	2	152.22
5	Makar Ignatov	Russia	216.33	7	71.68	5	144.65
6	Oleksii Bychenko	Israel	211.21	4	76.01	7	135.20
7	Ivan Pavlov	Ukraine	210.89	3	76.31	8	134.58
8	Maurizio Zandron	Italy	205.03	5	74.19	9	130.84
9	Anton Shulepov	Russia	204.53	8	68.84	6	135.69
10	Peter Liebers	Germany	196.59	9	67.79	11	128.80
11	Jiří Bělohradský	Czech Republic	190.04	12	59.32	10	130.72
12	Matyáš Bělohradský	Czech Republic	181.73	14	58.60	12	123.13
13	Ihor Reznichenko	Poland	174.58	13	58.88	13	115.70
14	Yakau Zenko	Belarus	169.95	11	60.35	14	109.60
15	Anton Karpuk	Belarus	163.03	15	54.86	15	108.17
16	Byun Se-jong	South Korea	153.62	16	49.90	16	103.72
17	Davide Lewton Brain	Monaco	126.74	17	40.70	17	86.04

=== Ladies ===
Rank	Name	Nation	Total	SP		FS	
1	Elizabet Tursynbayeva	Kazakhstan	187.57	3	60.62	1	126.95
2	Serafima Sakhanovich	Russia	174.49	2	60.63	2	113.86
3	An So-hyun	South Korea	169.22	1	60.75	3	108.47
4	Anastasia Gracheva	Russia	162.59	6	56.03	4	106.56
5	Nicole Schott	Germany	161.62	4	57.70	5	103.92
6	Anna Khnychenkova	Ukraine	157.09	5	57.44	7	99.65
7	Kim Ha-nul	South Korea	153.50	8	51.91	6	101.59
8	Anita Östlund	Sweden	150.31	7	54.59	8	95.72
9	Lutricia Bock	Germany	135.88	14	46.37	9	89.51
10	Elžbieta Kropa	Lithuania	133.88	10	48.65	10	85.23
11	Eliška Březinová	Czech Republic	127.77	9	51.63	14	76.14
12	Michaela Lucie Hanzlíková	Czech Republic	127.27	12	46.41	11	80.86
13	Greta Morkytė	Lithuania	126.12	13	46.37	12	79.75
14	Yoonmi Lehmann	Switzerland	124.81	11	48.37	13	76.44
15	Johanna Allik	Estonia	107.21	15	39.97	16	67.24
16	Angelīna Kučvaļska	Latvia	107.20	16	38.46	15	68.74
17	Hanna Paroshyna	Belarus	97.85	17	35.36	17	62.49
18	Maryia Saldakayeva	Belarus	92.04	18	33.94	18	58.10
19	Katsiarina Pakhamovich	Belarus	66.97	19	24.85	20	42.12
20	Tatsiana Chornaya	Belarus	66.38	20	23.32	19	43.06

=== Pairs ===
Rank	Name	Nation	Total	SP		FS	
1	Aleksandra Boikova / Dmitrii Kozlovskii	Russia	191.58	1	64.46	1	127.12
2	Annika Hocke / Ruben Blommaert	Germany	172.64	2	59.58	2	113.06
3	Paige Conners / Evgeni Krasnopolski	Israel	153.98	4	51.86	3	102.12
4	Minerva Fabienne Hase / Nolan Seegert	Germany	153.16	3	55.38	4	97.78
5	Alina Ustimkina / Nikita Volodin	Russia	136.96	5	50.26	5	86.70
6	Ioulia Chtchetinina / Mikhail Akulov	Switzerland	124.28	6	41.48	6	82.80

=== Ice dance ===
Rank	Name	Nation	Total	SD		FD	
1	Anna Cappellini / Luca Lanotte	Italy	183.49	1	74.00	1	109.49
2	Tiffany Zahorski / Jonathan Guerreiro	Russia	169.81	2	67.99	2	101.82
3	Victoria Sinitsina / Nikita Katsalapov	Russia	165.30	3	63.81	3	101.49
4	Oleksandra Nazarova / Maxim Nikitin	Ukraine	156.21	4	63.32	4	92.89
5	Yura Min / Alexander Gamelin	South Korea	152.00	5	61.97	5	90.03
6	Katharina Müller / Tim Dieck	Germany	138.96	6	55.62	7	83.34
7	Anna Yanovskaya / Ádám Lukács	Hungary	138.64	7	55.43	8	83.21
8	Shari Koch / Christian Nüchtern	Germany	135.52	11	51.68	6	83.84
9	Justyna Plutowska / Jeremie Flemin	Poland	129.80	10	52.39	9	77.41
10	Jennifer Urban / Benjamin Steffan	Germany	128.43	9	52.71	11	75.72
11	Vlada Solovieva / Yuri Vlasenko	Russia	123.33	12	46.60	10	76.73
12	Anna Kublikova / Yuri Hulitski	Belarus	119.16	13	46.31	12	72.85
13	Adel Tankova / Ronald Zilberberg	Israel	112.45	14	45.11	13	67.34
WD	Viktoria Kavaliova / Yurii Bieliaiev	Belarus	55.42	8	55.42	withdrew from competition	
