= Alexandra Avstriyskaya =

Russian figure skater

Personal information
- Native name: Александра Алексеевна Австрийская
- Full name: Alexandra Alexeyevna Avstriyskaya
- Born: 30 October 2000 (age 25) Moscow, Russia
- Home town: Moscow
- Height: 1.68 m (5 ft 6 in)

Figure skating career
- Country: Russia
- Coach: Inna Goncharenko
- Skating club: CSKA Moscow
- Began skating: 2005

Alexandra Alexeyevna Avstriyskaya (Russian: Александра Алексеевна Австрийская; born 30 October 2000 in Moscow) is a Russian figure skater. She is the 2016 CS Warsaw Cup bronze medalist in ladies' singles.

== Personal life ==
Alexandra's mother is Marina Avstriyskaya, a Soviet figure skater who competed in pairs skating.

== Competitive highlights ==
CS: Challenger Series

Competition placements at senior level
Season	2016–17	2017–18
CS Golden Spin of Zagreb	5th	
CS Tallinn Trophy		7th
CS Warsaw Cup	3rd	8th

== Detailed results ==
Results in the 2017–18 season
Date	Event	SP		FS		Total	
Date	Event	P	Score	P	Score	P	Score
Nov 16–19, 2017	(Poland) 2017 CS Warsaw Cup	9	45.90	8	83.30	8	129.20
Nov 21–26, 2017	(Estonia) 2017 CS Tallinn Trophy	14	50.43	6	102.87	7	153.30

Results in the 2016–17 season
Date	Event	SP		FS		Total	
Date	Event	P	Score	P	Score	P	Score
Nov 16–20, 2016	(Poland) 2016 CS Warsaw Cup	3	54.84	4	102.73	3	157.57
Dec 7–10, 2016	(Croatia) 2016 CS Golden Spin of Zagreb	4	63.66	9	98.11	5	161.77
