= Alexei Krasnozhon =

Russian-American figure skater (born 2000)

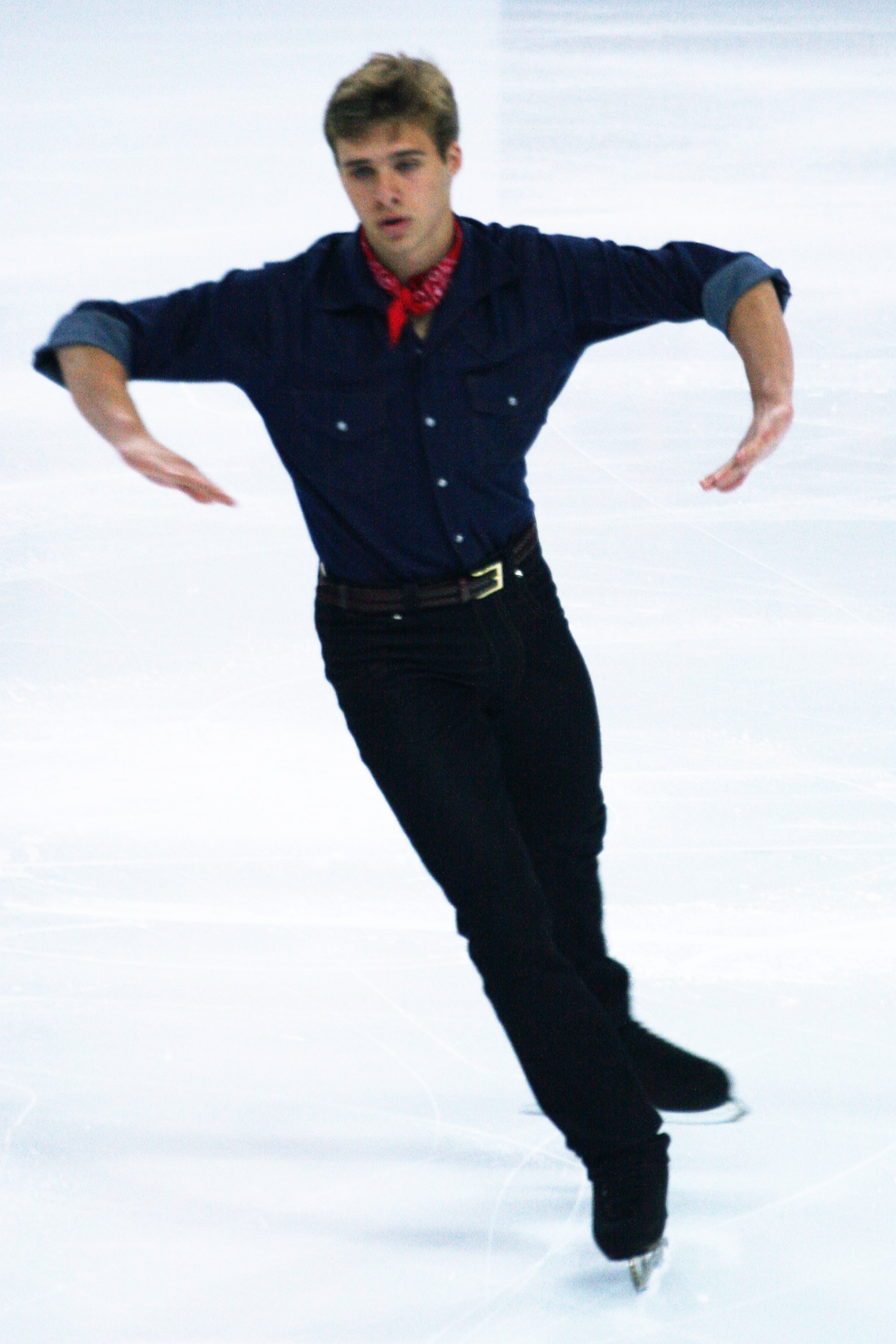
- Krasnozhon at the 2016−17 JGP Final

Personal information
- Native name: Алексей Дмитриевич Красножон (Russian)
- Full name: Alexei Dmitriyevich Krasnozhon
- Other names: Aleksei
- Born: April 11, 2000 (age 26) Saint Petersburg, Russia
- Height: 5 ft 10 in (1.79 m)

Figure skating career
- Country: United States
- Discipline: Men's singles
- Began skating: 2005
- Retired: May 12, 2021
Medal record
Junior Grand Prix Final
Gold medal – first place	2017–18 Nagoya	Men's singles

Alexei Dmitriyevich Krasnozhon (Russian: Алексей Дмитриевич Красножон; born April 11, 2000) is a Russian-American former competitive figure skater. Competing for the United States, he is the 2017 CS Tallinn Trophy silver medalist, 2017 Junior Grand Prix Final champion, and 2017 U.S. national junior champion. Krasnozhon skated for Russia earlier in his career, making his last international appearance in December 2013.

== Personal life ==
Krasnozhon was born on April 11, 2000, in Saint Petersburg, Russia. His mother, Natalia, is an endocrinologist and his father, Dmitri, is an oncologist. He has two younger sisters, named Dana and Sofia. In 2014, Krasnozhon moved to Dallas, Texas. While training in Texas, he lived with his coaches, Peter and Darlene Cain, for five years. He later moved to live on his own in Plano, where his parents often visited. After relocating with coaches Olga Ganicheva and Alexei Letov to Boston, Kranoszhon roomed with fellow skaters Jimmy Ma and Misha Mitrofanov in Norwood.

In March 2018, Krasnozhon said that he planned to apply for U.S. citizenship and applied as an alien of extraordinary ability after turning 18. He received his green card in September 2020. Krasnozhon retired prior to the 2021–22 season, as he noted he would have been unable to gain citizenship in time for the 2022 Winter Olympics. Although he originally planned to retire after the Olympics in January 2022, he acknowledged that it would have been difficult for him to make the team regardless of his citizenship and chose to retire earlier and instead pursue a college degree.

While skating, Krasnozhon enrolled in a private online high school and expressed interest in a business degree from Georgetown University or Southern Methodist University. In his May 2021 retirement announcement, he shared that he would be attending Texas Christian University's John V. Roach Honors College. Krasnozhon has expressed interest in becoming an immigration lawyer, as he was thankful for the opportunities afforded to him and his family by moving to the United States.

== Career ==
=== In Russia ===
Krasnozhon began skating as a five-year-old. At age seven, he became a student of Alexei Mishin, as well as his wife Tatiana Mishina and their assistant coach Oleg Tataurov. He competed for Russia at the Volvo Open Cup in January 2013, winning gold on the advanced novice level, and placed twelfth at the 2013 Russian Junior Championships.

Krasnozhon won the junior silver medal at the Denkova-Staviski Cup in December 2013. He missed much of the season due to a back injury.

=== Switch to the United States ===
In March 2014, Krasnozhon announced that he planned to compete for the United States and would be coached by Peter Cain and Darlene Cain in Euless, Texas. He qualified for the 2015 US Championships on the junior level and won the pewter medal.

On July 1, 2015, the Russian Figure Skating Federation released Krasnozhon so that he could compete internationally for the United States. While training in Moscow, Krasnozhon performed full run-throughs of his programs about once a week, but he began doing them daily after moving to Texas.

=== 2015–2016 season ===
Making his Junior Grand Prix (JGP) debut, Krasnozhon won the bronze medal in August 2015 in Riga, Latvia. He then placed fifth in Toruń, Poland. After receiving the junior gold medal at the Midwestern Sectionals, he closed his season by winning the junior bronze medal at the 2016 U.S. Championships, finishing behind Tomoki Hiwatashi and Kevin Shum.

=== 2016–2017 season ===
Competing in the 2016 JGP series, Krasnozhon won silver in Ostrava, Czech Republic, and then gold in Ljubljana, Slovenia. He qualified to the Junior Grand Prix Final in Marseille, France, where he finished fifth. At the 2017 U.S. Championships, he won the junior men's title. He qualified to the free skate at the 2017 World Junior Championships in Taipei, Taiwan.

=== 2017–2018 season ===
Making his senior international debut, Krasnozhon placed fourth at the Philadelphia Summer International in early August 2017. Competing in the Junior Grand Prix series, Krasnozhon won gold medals in Brisbane, Australia, and Zagreb, Croatia, which qualified him for the Final for a second time. Competing at his first Challenger event, and he won a silver medal at the 2017 CS Tallinn Trophy. Krasnozhon then won gold at the Junior Grand Prix Final in Nagoya, Japan. He outscored the silver medalist, Camden Pulkinen, by more than 19 points and set a new personal best total score, 236.35 points, at the competition.

Krasnozhon competed in the senior ranks at the 2018 U.S. Championships, placing eighth in the short program, thirteenth in the free skate, and tenth overall. In March, he placed first in the short program at the 2018 World Junior Championships in Sofia, Bulgaria. While attempting a quad salchow during his free skate, he sustained a Grade 2 sprain of all three major ligaments in his right ankle, causing him to withdraw.

Krasnozhon changed coaches during the off-season, deciding to train under Olga Ganicheva and Alexei Letov at the Dr. Pepper Starcenter in Plano, Texas.

=== 2018–2019 season ===
Krasnozhon started his season off at the 2018 CS Nebelhorn Trophy, where he placed fifth overall. Krasnozhon was invited to two senior Grand Prix events, the 2018 Grand Prix of Helsinki and 2018 Rostelecom Cup. Making his Grand Prix debut, Krasnozhon placed sixth at the Grand Prix of Helsinki and eighth at the Rostelecom Cup. Krasnozhon withdrew from the 2018 CS Golden Spin of Zagreb in December 2018.

At the 2019 U.S. Championships, Krasnozhon placed fifth. Assigned to compete at the 2019 World Junior Championships, he placed fifth in the short program, making a minor error on his Lutz-loop combination. In March 2019, he won gold medal at the Egna Spring Trophy.

=== 2019–2020 season ===
In early August, Krasnozhon received the bronze medal at the Philadelphia Summer International. Krasnozhon next placed fourth at the 2019 CS U.S. Classic. In the free skate, he landed the quad loop for the first time. At his first Grand Prix of the year, 2019 Skate America, he placed tenth in the short program after underrotating and falling on an attempted quad flip, a new jump for him. In the free skate, he had a "hard, painful" fall on his quad flip attempt, but executed the rest of his planned triple jumps successfully, and rose to ninth place overall. He was tenth at the 2019 Rostelecom Cup. three week later he finished ninth at the 2019 CS Golden Spin of Zagreb.

Competing at the 2020 U.S. Championships, Krasnozhon placed sixth in the short program, attempting only triple jumps. In the free skate he underrotated an attempted quad loop and put a hand down on a triple Axel, but remained in sixth place.

=== 2020–2021 season ===
With the coronavirus pandemic raging, the ISU chose to assign the Grand Prix based largely on training location, leading to Krasnozhon attending the 2020 Skate America. Krasnozhon landed another quad loop in the short program, placing fifth, but struggled in the free skate and fell to seventh place overall.

Krasnozhon competed at the 2021 U.S. Championships, placing sixteenth out of seventeen skaters in the short program after falling on every jump. He rallied in the free skate, placing seventh in that segment, rising to eleventh place overall.

On May 12, he announced his retirement from competitive skating, saying that he would be attending Texas Christian University starting in the Fall of 2021.

== Programs ==
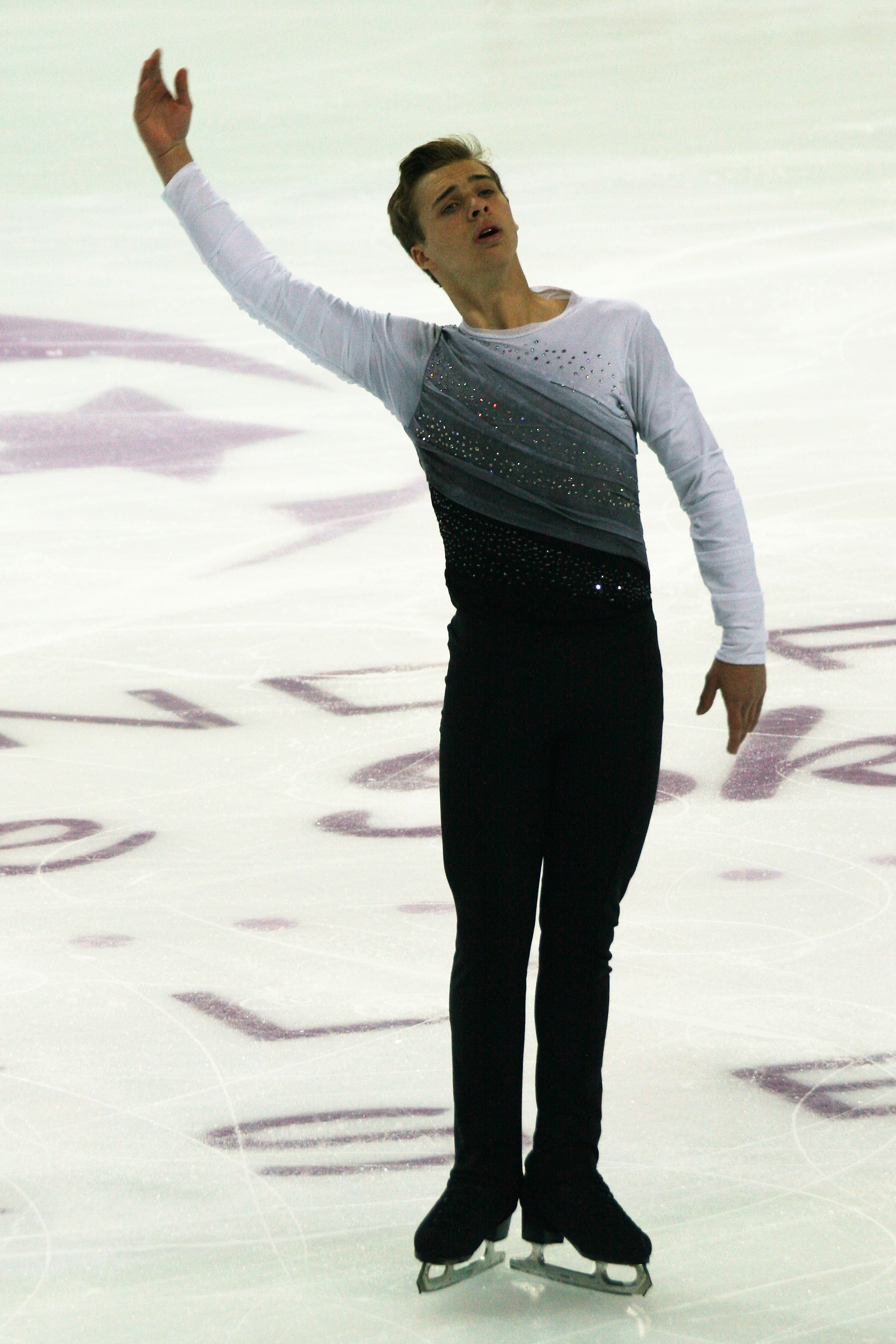
Krasnozhon at the 2016–17 Junior Grand Prix Final

Season	Short program	Free skating	Exhibition
2020–2021	Je dors sur les roses (from Mozart, l'opéra rock) by Mikelangelo Loconte choreo. by Adam Blake; Heart Upon My Sleeve by Avicii & Imagine Dragons choreo. by Alex Johnson, Evgeni Nemorovski	Dracula: Prelude (from Fahrenheit 451) by Antony Partos and Matteo Zingales; Louis' Revenge; Santiago's Waltz (from Interview with the Vampire) by Elliot Goldenthal; The Hunter's Prelude (from Bram Stoker's Dracula) by Wojciech Kilar; Archangel by Two Steps from Hell choreo. by Alex Johnson	
2019–2020	Runaway (from Westworld) by Kanye West performed by Ramin Djawadi; Freedom by Pharrell Williams choreo. by Alex Johnson	Dracula: Prelude (from Fahrenheit 451) by Antony Partos and Matteo Zingales; Louis' Revenge; Santiago's Waltz (from Interview with the Vampire) by Elliot Goldenthal; The Hunter's Prelude (from Bram Stoker's Dracula) by Wojciech Kilar; Archangel by Two Steps from Hell choreo. by Alex Johnson	
2018–2019	Dancing on My Own by Calum Scott choreo. by Scott Brown	Piano Concerto in A minor, Op 16 by Edvard Grieg choreo. by Marina Zueva; Korobushka by Bond	
2017–2018	Korobushka by Bond choreo. by Scott Brown	Now We Are Free (from Gladiator) performed by Andrea Bocelli choreo. by Scott Brown	
2016–2017	Etude Op. 10, No. 3 in E by Frédéric Chopin choreo. by Scott Brown	Rodeo by Aaron Copland choreo. by Scott Brown; 50. Four Dance Episodes: III. Saturday Night Waltz; 51. Four Dance Episodes: IV. Hoedown	
2015–2016	Jam by Michael Jackson choreo. by Scott Brown	The Bolt by Dmitri Shostakovich choreo. by Scott Brown	
2014–2015	Love Story by Francis Lai choreo. by Scott Brown	Tango Amore by Edvin Marton choreo. by Scott Brown	
2013–2014	Love Story by Francis Lai choreo. by Scott Brown	Tango Amore by Edvin Marton choreo. by Scott Brown	
2012–2013	Russian folk music choreo. by Tatiana Prokofieva	Sing, Sing, Sing (with a Swing) by Benny Goodman; Georgia on My Mind performed by Glenn Miller choreo. by Tatiana Prokofieva	

== Competitive highlights ==
GP: Grand Prix; CS: Challenger Series; JGP: ISU Junior Grand Prix

=== For the United States ===
International
Event	14–15	15–16	16–17	17–18	18–19	19–20	20–21
GP Finland					7th		
GP Rostelecom Cup					8th	10th	
GP Skate America						9th	7th
CS Golden Spin					WD	9th	
CS Nebelhorn					5th		
CS Tallinn Trophy				2nd			
CS U.S. Classic						4th	
Challenge Cup						WD	
Egna Trophy					1st		
Philadelphia				4th		3rd	
International: Junior
Junior Worlds			8th	WD	11th		
JGP Final			5th	1st			
JGP Australia				1st			
JGP Croatia				1st			
JGP Czech Republic			2nd				
JGP Latvia		3rd					
JGP Poland		5th					
JGP Slovenia			1st				
Philadelphia		1st					
National
U.S. Champ.	4th J	3rd J	1st J	10th	5th	6th	11th
J = Junior level; TBD = Assigned; WD = Withdrew

=== For Russia ===
International
Event	11–12	12–13	13–14
Denkova-Staviski Cup			2nd J
Volvo Open Cup		1st N	4th J
National
Russian Junior Champ.	14th	12th	
Levels: N = Advanced novice; J = Junior

== Detailed results ==
Small medals for short and free programs awarded only at ISU Championships. ISU Personal best highlighted in bold.

=== Senior results ===
**2020–21 season**
Date	Event	SP	FS	Total
January 11–21, 2021	2021 U.S. Championships	16; 54.53	7; 152.23	11; 206.76
October 23–24, 2020	2020 Skate America	5; 78.06	9; 136.55	7; 214.61
**2019–20 season**
Date	Event	SP	FS	Total
January 20–26, 2020	2020 U.S. Championships	6; 80.71	6; 160.61	6; 241.32
December 4–7, 2019	2019 CS Golden Spin of Zagreb	7; 73.26	8; 139.25	9; 212.51
November 15–17, 2019	2019 Rostelecom Cup	10; 75.46	11; 140.82	10; 216.28
October 25–27, 2019	2019 Skate America	10; 72.30	6; 144.29	9; 216.59
September 17–22, 2019	2019 CS U.S. International Classic	5; 76.92	3; **153.19**	4; **230.11**
Jul. 31 – Aug. 3, 2019	2019 Philadelphia Summer International	3; 65.78	3; 127.84	3; 193.62
**2018–19 season**
Date	Event	SP	FS	Total
March 28–31, 2019	2019 Egna Spring Trophy	1; 74.17	2; 145.95	1; 220.12
January 19–27, 2019	2019 U.S. Championships	5; 82.53	5; 151.99	5; 234.52
November 16–18, 2018	2018 Rostelecom Cup	6; 75.32	8; 132.69	8; 208.01
November 2–4, 2018	2018 Grand Prix of Helsinki	8; 74.05	6; 136.98	7; 211.03
September 26–29, 2018	2018 CS Nebelhorn Trophy	6; 67.32	5; 126.78	5; 194.10

=== Junior results ===
2018–19 season
Date	Event	Level	SP	FS	Total
March 4–10, 2019	2019 World Junior Championships	Junior	5; **79.98**	12; 131.49	11; 211.47
2017–18 season
Date	Event	Level	SP	FS	Total
March 5–11, 2018	2018 World Junior Championships	Junior	1; 80.28	WD	WD
Dec. 29 – Jan. 8, 2017	2018 U.S. Championships	Senior	8; 82.58	13; 141.00	10; 223.58
December 7–10, 2017	2017−18 Junior Grand Prix Final	Junior	1; **81.33**	1; **155.02**	1; **236.35**
November 21–26, 2017	2017 CS Tallinn Trophy	Senior	3; 80.20	2; 142.19	2; 222.39
September 27–30, 2017	2017 JGP Croatia	Junior	1; 80.26	2; 145.22	1; 225.48
August 23–26, 2017	2017 JGP Australia	Junior	1; 75.04	1; 134.33	1; 209.37
August 3–5, 2017	2017 Philadelphia Summer International	Senior	1; 76.37	7; 129.88	4; 206.25
2016–17 season
Date	Event	Level	SP	FS	Total
March 15–19, 2017	2017 World Junior Championships	Junior	8; 76.50	10; 134.97	8; 211.47
January 14–22, 2017	2017 U.S. Junior Championships	Junior	2; 66.89	1; 144.16	1; 211.05
December 8–11, 2016	2016–17 Junior Grand Prix Final	Junior	5; 71.48	6; 137.37	5; 208.85
September 21–25, 2016	2016 JGP Slovenia	Junior	2; 71.98	1; 139.20	1; 211.18
Aug. 31 – Sept. 3, 2016	2016 JGP Czech Republic	Junior	2; 75.10	2; 148.50	2; 223.60
2015–16 season
Date	Event	Level	SP	FS	Total
January 15–24, 2016	2016 U.S. Junior Championships	Junior	7; 53.96	3; 122.25	3; 176.21
September 23–27, 2015	2015 JGP Poland	Junior	5; 62.44	3; 132.14	5; 194.58
August 26–30, 2015	2015 JGP Latvia	Junior	3; 67.53	3; 127.15	3; 194.68
August 3–5, 2015	2015 Philadelphia Summer International	Junior	1; 65.56	1; 114.11	1; 179.67
2014–15 season
Date	Event	Level	SP	FS	Total
January 18–25, 2015	2015 U.S. Junior Championships	Junior	6; 60.52	2; 129.70	4; 190.22
2013–14 season
Date	Event	Level	SP	FS	Total
Nov. 29 – Dec. 1, 2013	2013 Denkova-Staviski Cup	Junior	2; 51.72	2; 116.55	2; 168.27
2012–13 season
Date	Event	Level	SP	FS	Total
February 1–3, 2013	2013 Russian Junior Championships	Junior	5; 67.21	17; 110.85	12; 178.06
