= Stanislava Konstantinova =

Russian figure skater (born 2000)

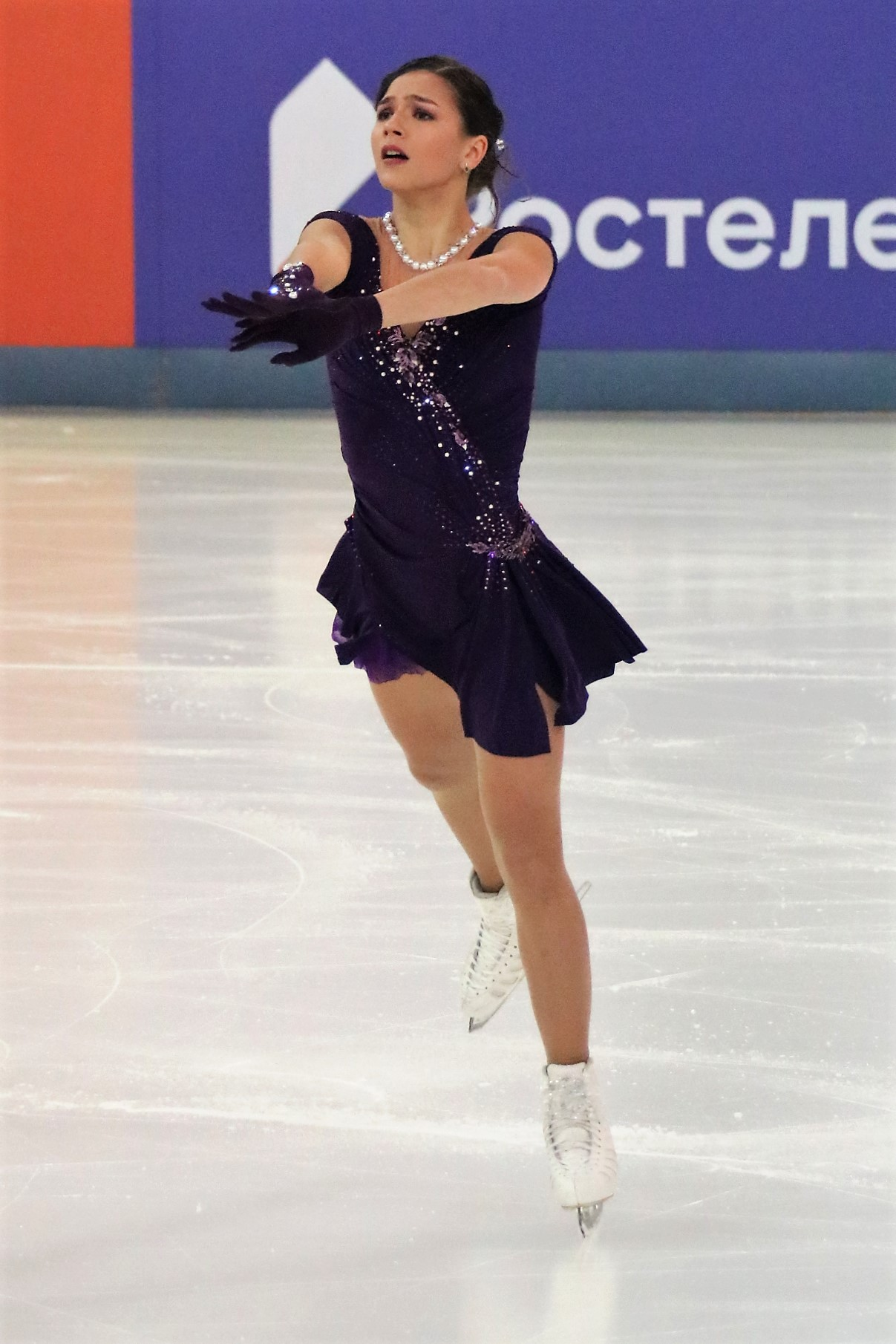
- Konstantinova at the 2019 Russian Figure Skating Championships

Personal information
- Native name: Станислава Андреевна Константинова (Russian)
- Full name: Stanislava Andreyevna Konstantinova
- Born: 14 July 2000 (age 26) Saint Petersburg, Russia
- Height: 1.70 m (5 ft 7 in)

Figure skating career
- Country: Russia
- Coach: Viktoria Butsaeva
- Skating club: Sports school of the Olympic reserve "Moskvich" (Moscow)
- Began skating: 2006
- Retired: January 20, 2023
Medal record
Representing Russia
Figure skating: Ladies' singles
Winter Universiade
Bronze medal – third place	2019 Krasnoyarsk	Ladies' singles

Stanislava Andreyevna Konstantinova (Russian: Станислава Андреевна Константинова; born 14 July 2000) is a retired Russian figure skater. She is the 2019 Winter Universiade bronze medalist, 2018 Grand Prix of Helsinki silver medalist, a two-time CS Tallinn Trophy champion (2016, 2017) and the 2017 CS Warsaw Cup silver medalist.

On the junior level, she is the 2016 JGP Russia silver medalist, the 2017 JGP Belarus bronze medalist, the 2015 Tallinn Trophy champion, and the 2017 Russian junior national silver medalist.

== Personal life ==
Konstantinova was born on 14 July 2000 in Saint Petersburg, Russia. Her mother trained in rhythmic gymnastics and track and field and her father in karate. Her sister, Kristina, is eleven years younger.

== Career ==
Konstantinova began learning to skate in 2006. Valentina Chebotareva became her coach when she was nine years old. She made her international debut in November 2012 at the 2012 Tallinn Trophy, where she won the junior gold medal. In the 2015–16 season she won second gold medal at the 2015 Tallinn Trophy. In 2016–17 season she made her Junior Grand Prix debut. She won silver medal at the JGP Russia, she then placed fourth at the JGP Germany.

Konstantinova made her international senior debut at the 2016 CS Tallinn Trophy where she won gold medal with a personal best score of 186.97 points. Placing first in both programs, she won the gold medal by a margin of more than 9 points over silver medalist Serafima Sakhanovich.

=== 2017–18 season ===
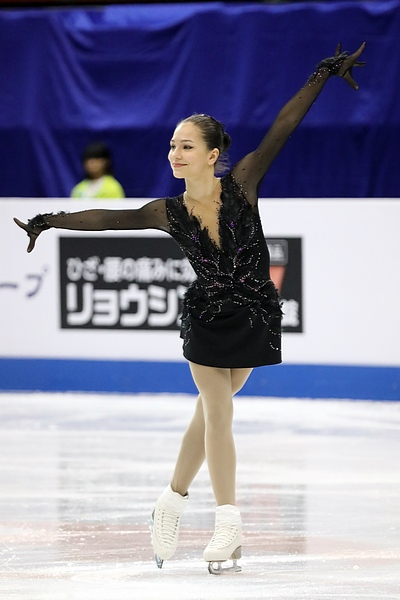
Konstantinova at the 2017 World Junior Figure Skating Championships

In November 2017 Konstantinova competed the 2017 CS Tallinn Trophy where she won the gold medal. This was her second consecutive victory at Tallinn Trophy. Two weeks later she won the 2017 CS Golden Spin of Zagreb with a personal best score of 199.68 points.

In December 2017 she placed fourth at the 2018 Russian Championships after placing tenth in the short program and third in the free skate. She then competed at the 2018 Russian Junior Championships where she won the bronze medal.

In March 2018 Konstantinova competed at the 2018 Junior Worlds where she placed fourth after placing sixth in the short program and fifth in the free skate. She was subsequently called up to replace Evgenia Medvedeva at the 2018 World Championships in Milan. She was later described as having "more or less bombed" the competition, placing sixteenth in the short program and twentieth in the free skate, for nineteenth place overall. Konstantinova would admit to being "really down after that." She described herself as "very grateful to my family that they supported me in this difficult time, thankful to the fans that didn’t turn away from me and continued to support me. I healed my soul through work and I drew a lot of conclusions for myself."

=== 2018–19 season ===
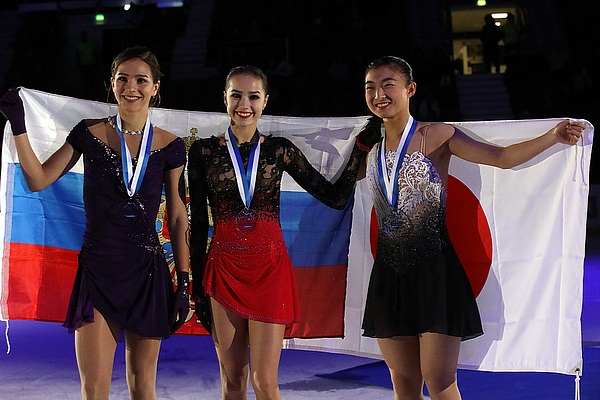
Konstantinova (left) alongside medalists Alina Zagitova (centre) and Kaori Sakamoto (right) at 2018 Grand Prix of Helsinki

Konstantinova started her season by competing at two ISU Challenger Series events. In mid September she won the bronze medal at the 2018 CS Ondrej Nepela Trophy and two weeks later she placed fourth at the 2018 CS Finlandia Trophy, fractions of a point behind Finnish skater Viveca Lindfors. In early November she made her Grand Prix debut at 2018 Grand Prix of Helsinki where she won the silver medal behind her teammate Alina Zagitova. In late November she finished fifth at the 2018 Internationaux de France.

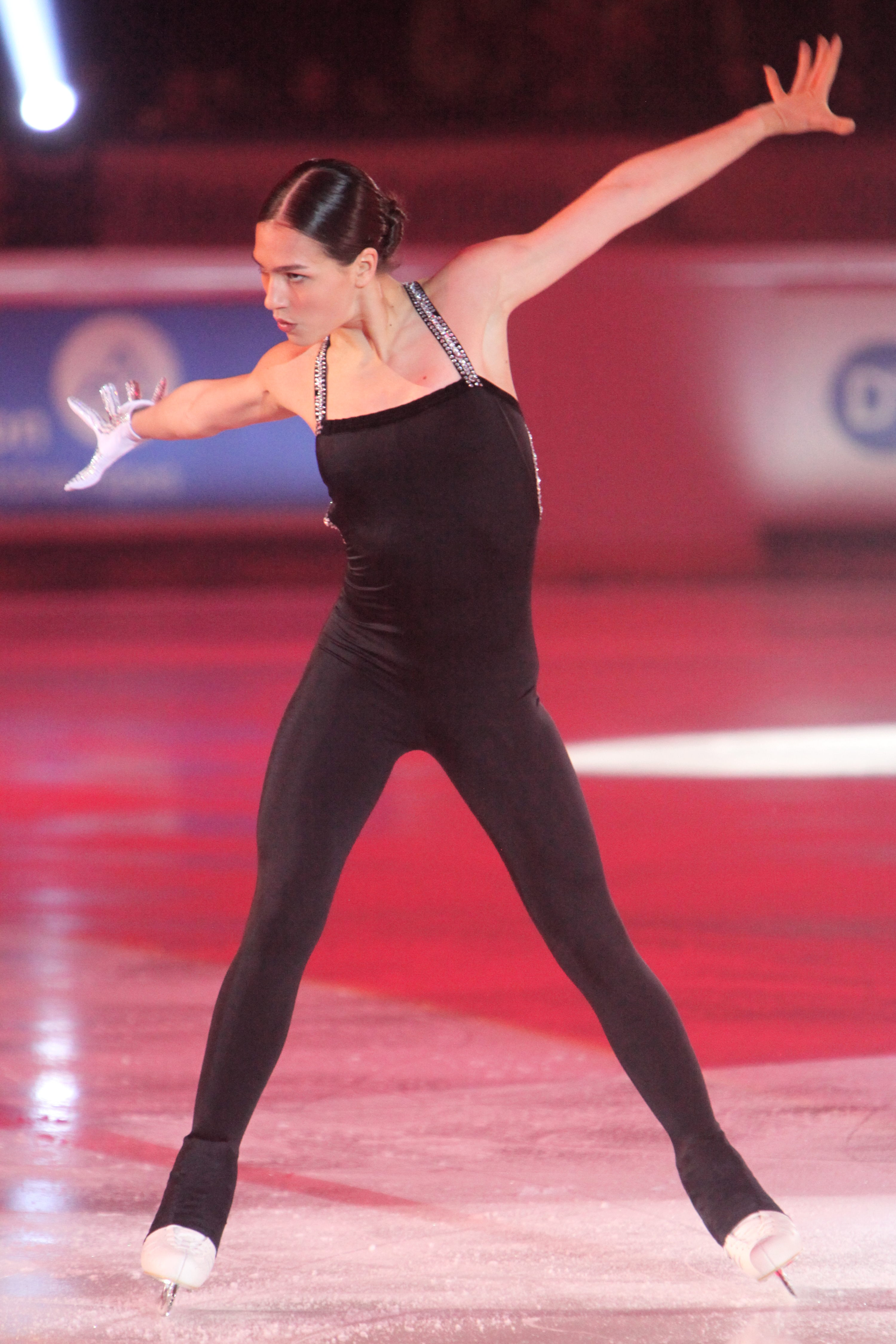
Konstantinova performing her gala at the 2018 Grand Prix de France

At the 2019 Russian Championships, Konstantinova initially placed fourth in the short program. In the free skate, she popped an Axel and underrotated a triple Lutz, placing fifth in the free skate and fourth overall. Konstantinova was the highest-ranked international senior skater in the competition, 0.89 points ahead of Alina Zagitova. Speaking afterward, she said she was "not too happy with my free as I made mistakes, but I proved that I am competitive in this field."

Konstantinova was assigned to the 2019 European Championships along with Zagitova and Sofia Samodurova, the other top senior qualifiers at the Russian Championships. In the short program, Konstantinova doubled her attempted triple Lutz and underrotated her triple flip, as a result placing eleventh. She placed second in the free skate, behind only Samodurova, and finished in fourth place overall, behind Samodurova, Zagitova, and Lindfors. Competing next at the domestic Russian Cup Final, she placed second in the short program, behind only Medvedeva, but fell to sixth in the free, and was again fourth overall. Although initially submitted as one of Russia's three entries for the 2019 World Championships, she was subsequently withdrawn and replaced by Medvedeva.

=== 2019–20 season ===
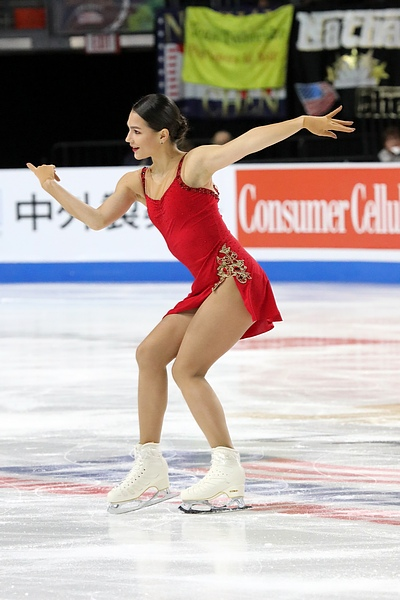
Konstantinova at the 2019 Skate America

Beginning the season at the 2019 CS Ondrej Nepela Memorial, Konstantinova placed seventh. At her first Grand Prix assignment, 2019 Skate America, she had several falls and popped jumps, finishing eleventh out of twelve skaters. She was eleventh as well at the 2019 Rostelecom Cup. Konstantinova finished the season at the 2020 Russian Championships.

=== 2020–21 season ===
With the COVID-19 pandemic affecting the international season, Konstantinova competed on the domestic Cup of Russia series, placing fifth at the second stage in Moscow and ninth at the fourth stage in Kazan. As a result, she qualified for the 2021 Russian Figure Skating Championships. She placed sixteenth at the national championships. On January 13, Konstantinova announced that she'd be leaving coaches Alexander Volkov to train under Viktoria Butsaeva.

On July 29, 2022, it was reported that Stanislava Konstantinova had finished her career, but the figure skater herself denied this information, saying that she had temporarily suspended her career and would miss the new season.

=== Retirement ===
Not competing during season 2021–2022, Konstantinova has announced her retirement from competitive skating on her Instagram and mentioned that she will stay connected with figure skating as a coach and choreographer.

== Programs ==
Season	Short program	Free skating	Exhibition
2020–2021	Seven Nation Army performed by Postmodern Jukebox feat. Haley Reinhart choreo. by Martine Dagenais	My Love by Kovacs; Santa Maria by Gotan Project; The Devil You Know by Kovacs choreo. by Martine Dagenais	
2019–2020	February by Leonid Levashkevich choreo. by Olga Zotova	Ascension/Nature Boy performed by Ewan McGregor; One Day I'll Fly Away performed by Nicole Kidman & Ewan McGregor; El Tango de Roxanne performed by José Feliciano, Ewan McGregor, Jacek Koman (from Moulin Rouge!) choreo. by Olga Kliushnichenko	
2018–2019	Malagueña by Ernesto Lecuona	Anna Karenina: Unavoidable; She Is of the Heavens; Curtain; Anna's Last Train by Dario Marianelli choreo. by Olga Kliushnichenko	Billie Jean by Michael Jackson; Someone Like You by Adele
2017–2018	Corazón Espinado by Tania Blanco; I Like It by The Blackout All-Stars	Anna Karenina: Unavoidable; She Is of the Heavens; Curtain; Anna's Last Train by Dario Marianelli choreo. by Olga Kliushnichenko	You Don't Love Me performed by Caro Emerald
2016–2017	Swan Lake by Pyotr Ilyich Tchaikovsky	Alegría by Cirque du Soleil	
2015–2016	The Sleeping Beauty by Pyotr Ilyich Tchaikovsky	Alegría by Cirque du Soleil	
2014–2015	The Sleeping Beauty by Pyotr Ilyich Tchaikovsky	The Bolt by Dmitri Shostakovich	
2013–2014	Jeeves and Wooster by Anne Dudley	The Bolt by Dmitri Shostakovich	

== Competitive highlights ==
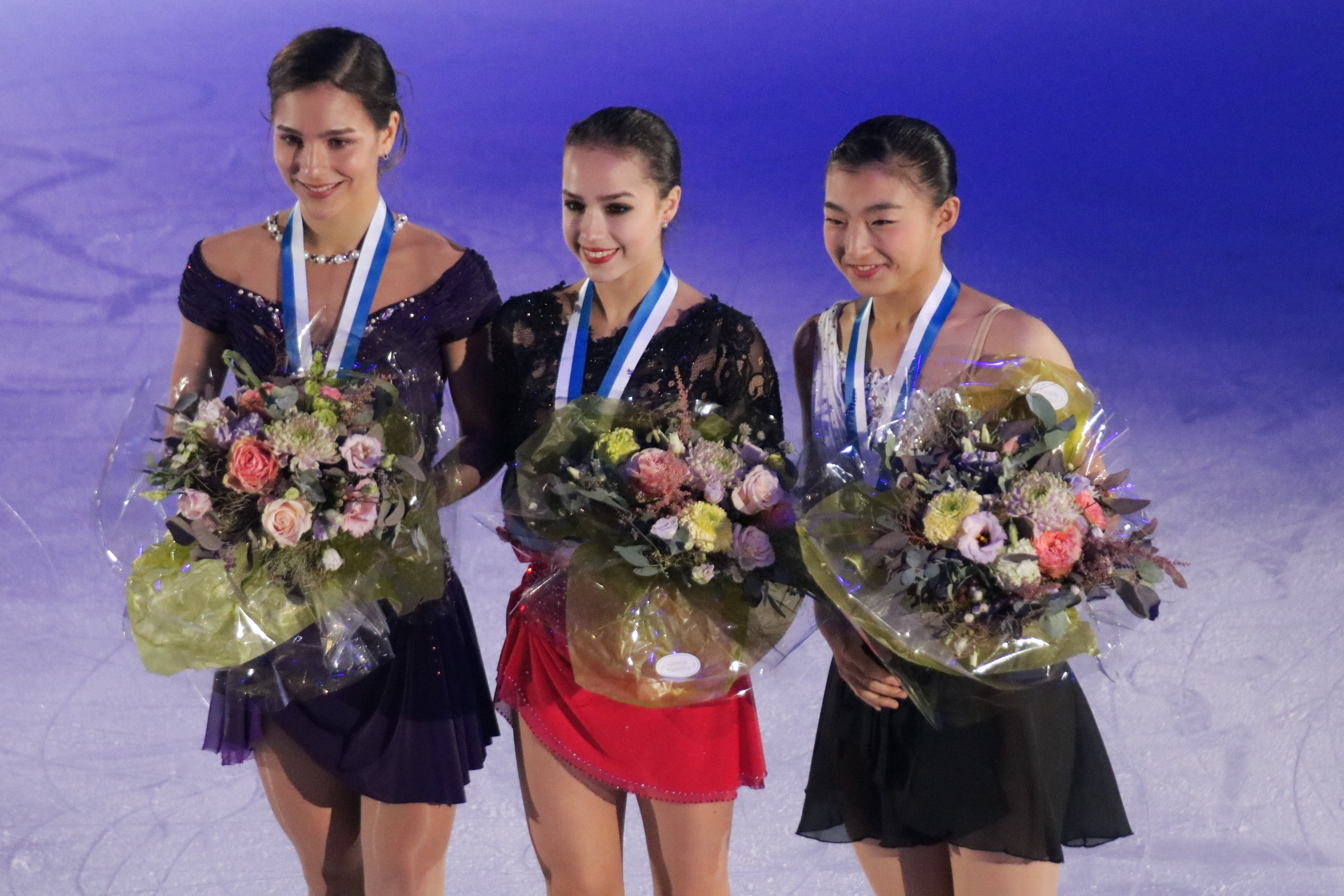
Konstantinova (left) with Alina Zagitova (center) and Kaori Sakamoto (right) at the 2018 Grand Prix of Helsinki podium.

GP: Grand Prix; CS: Challenger Series; JGP: Junior Grand Prix

International
Event	14–15	15–16	16–17	17–18	18–19	19–20	20-21
Worlds				19th			
Europeans					4th		
GP Finland					2nd		
GP Skate America						11th	
GP France					5th		
GP Rostelecom Cup						11th	
CS Finlandia					4th		
CS Golden Spin				1st		WD	
CS Ondrej Nepela					3rd	7th	
CS Tallinn Trophy			1st	1st			
CS Warsaw Cup				2nd			
Winter Universiade					3rd		
International: Junior
Junior Worlds			6th	4th			
JGP Belarus				3rd			
JGP Germany			4th				
JGP Russia			2nd				
Ice Challenge		1st					
Tallinn Trophy	2nd	1st					
National
Russian Champ.			6th	4th	4th	13th	16th
Russian Junior Champ.	17th	8th	2nd	3rd			
Russian Cup Final	5th J	1st J	WD		4th		

== Detailed results ==
=== Senior level ===
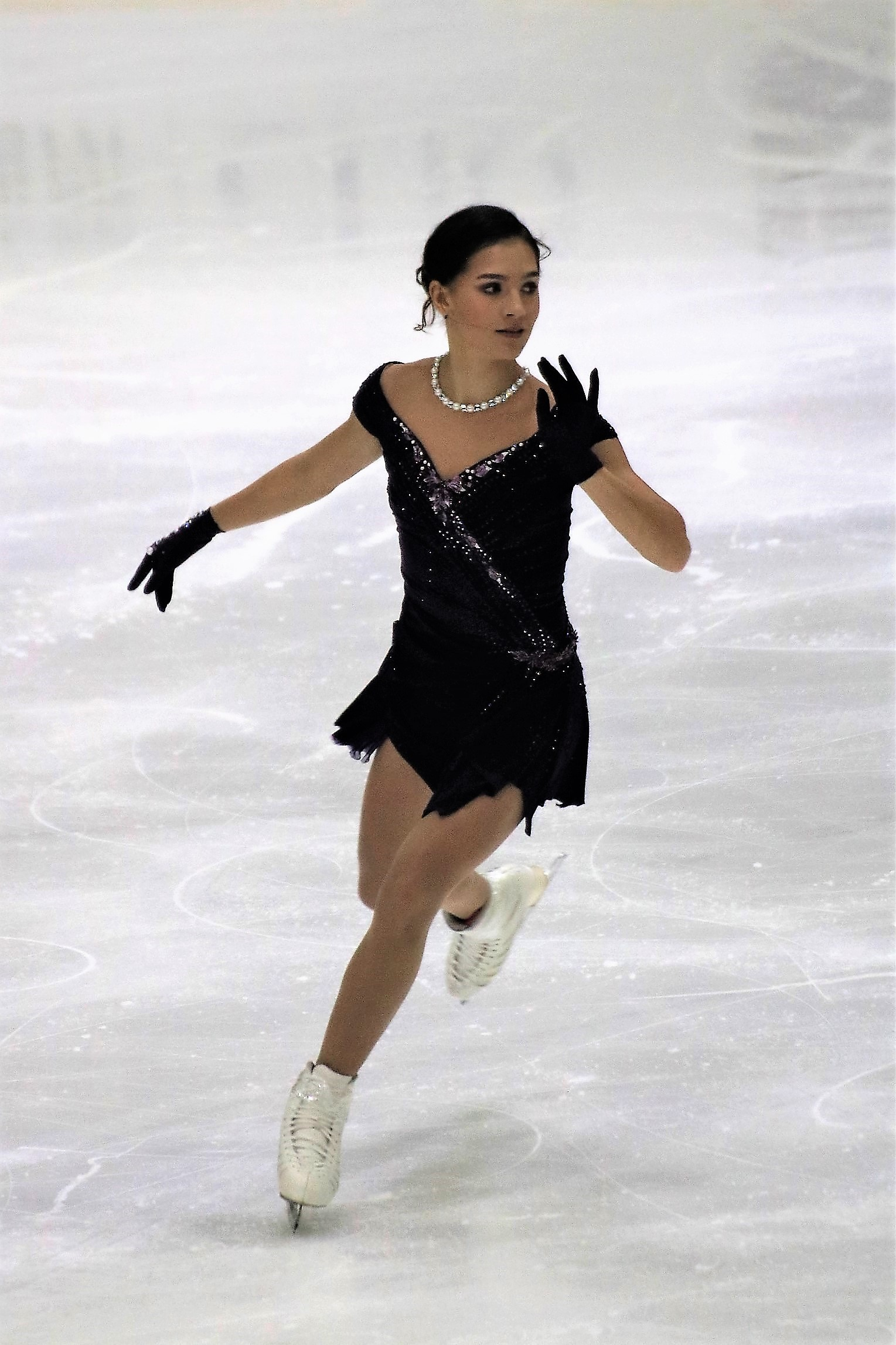
Konstantinova at the 2018 Grand Prix of Helsinki.

Small medals for short and free programs awarded only at ISU Championships. Personal bests highlighted in italic.

2020–21 season
Date	Event	SP	FS	Total
23–27 December 2020	2021 Russian Championships	13; 61.55	17; 106.78	16; 168.33
2019–20 season
Date	Event	SP	FS	Total
24–29 December 2019	2020 Russian Championships	9; 66.00	15; 114.34	13; 180.34
15–17 November 2019	2019 Rostelecom Cup	11; 54.36	11; 102.58	11; 156.94
18–20 October 2019	2019 Skate America	11; 48.27	12; 95.12	11; 143.39
19–21 September 2019	2019 CS Ondrej Nepela Memorial	5; 58.19	9; 104.06	7; 162.25
2018–19 season
Date	Event	SP	FS	Total
7–9 March 2019	2019 Winter Universiade	2; 70.25	3; 135.66	3; 205.91
18–22 February 2019	2019 Russian Cup Final	2; 75.47	6; 131.20	4; 206.67
21–27 January 2019	2019 European Championships	11; 56.76	2; 132.96	4; 189.72
19–23 December 2018	2019 Russian Championships	4; 74.40	5; 138.52	4; 212.92
23–25 November 2018	2018 Internationaux de France	10; 54.91	4; 134.76	5; 189.67
2–4 November 2018	2018 Grand Prix of Helsinki	4; 62.56	3; 135.01	2; 197.57
4–7 October 2018	2018 CS Finlandia Trophy	3; 65.39	4; 121.74	4; 187.13
19–22 September 2018	2018 CS Ondrej Nepela Trophy	3; 65.03	3; 114.99	3; 180.02
2017–18 season
Date	Event	SP	FS	Total
19–25 March 2018	2018 World Championships	16; 59.19	20; 93.84	19; 153.03
21–24 December 2017	2018 Russian Championships	10; 66.51	3; 144.77	4; 211.28
6–9 December 2017	2017 CS Golden Spin of Zagreb	2; 67.47	1; 132.21	1; 199.68
21–26 November 2017	2017 CS Tallinn Trophy	1; 64.41	1; 126.34	1; 190.75
16–19 November 2017	2017 CS Warsaw Cup	2; 59.84	2; 114.59	2; 174.43

=== Junior level ===
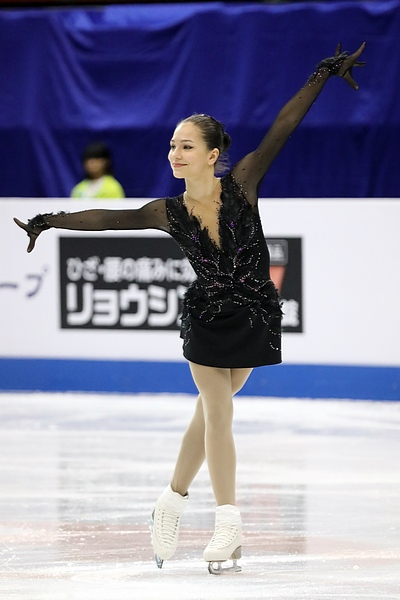
Konstantinova at the 2017 World Junior Championships.

Personal bests highlighted in italic.

2017–18 season
Date	Event	Level	SP	FS	Total
5–11 March 2018	2018 World Junior Championships	Junior	6; 62.63	5; 123.72	4; 186.35
23–26 January 2018	2018 Russian Junior Championships	Junior	12; 66.40	2; 139.87	3; 206.27
20–24 September 2017	2017 JGP Belarus	Junior	3; 59.85	2; 122.13	3; 181.98
2016–17 season
Date	Event	Level	SP	FS	Total
15–19 March 2017	2017 World Junior Championships	Junior	6; 58.90	6; 103.94	6; 162.84
1–5 February 2017	2017 Russian Junior Championships	Junior	2; 70.25	3; 130.60	2; 200.85
20–26 December 2016	2017 Russian Championships	Senior	7; 68.34	7; 131.85	6; 200.19
20–27 November 2016	2016 CS Tallinn Trophy	Senior	1; 63.85	1; 123.12	1; 186.97
5–9 October 2016	2016 JGP Germany	Junior	3; 59.00	4; 113.06	4; 172.06
14–18 September 2016	2016 JGP Russia	Junior	2; 64.38	3; 110.82	2; 175.20
2015–16 season
Date	Event	Level	SP	FS	Total
19–23 January 2016	2016 Russian Junior Championships	Junior	5; 64.19	11; 105.36	8; 169.55
18–22 November 2015	2015 Tallinn Trophy	Junior	1; 68.36	1; 123.50	1; 191.86
27–31 October 2015	2015 Ice Challenge	Junior	1; 63.66	1; 105.35	1; 169.01
2014–15 season
Date	Event	Level	SP	FS	Total
4–7 February 2015	2015 Russian Junior Championships	Junior	8; 58.40	17; 74.28	17; 132.68
