= Anna Kublikova =

Belarusian figure skater

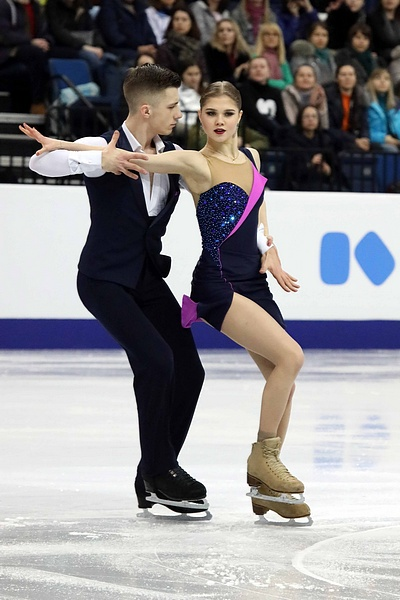
- Kublikova with Yuri Hulitski at the 2019 European Championships

Personal information
- Native name: Анна Александровна Кубликова
- Full name: Anna Alexandrovna Kublikova
- Born: 2 December 1998 (age 27) Kirov, Russia
- Home town: Minsk, Belarus
- Height: 172 cm (5 ft 8 in)

Figure skating career
- Country: Belarus
- Partner: Yuri Hulitski
- Coach: Alexander Zhulin, Alexei Sitnikov, T. Bieliaeva
- Skating club: RCOP Minsk
- Began skating: 2003
- Retired: 2019

Anna Alexandrovna Kublikova (Russian: Анна Александровна Кубликова; born 2 December 1998) is a Russian-born retired ice dancer who competed for Belarus. With Yuri Hulitski, she is the 2018 Open d'Andorra silver medalist and the 2019 Belarusian national champion. They competed at the 2019 World Championships and the 2019 European Championships.

== Career ==
Kublikova began competing with Yuri Hulitski for Belarus during the 2017–18 season. They made their international debut at the 2017 CS Minsk-Arena Ice Star where they finished 12th. They competed at the 2017 Volvo Open Cup where they finished 7th. They then competed at the 2017 CS Warsaw Cup where they finished 11th. Next, they competed at the 2017 CS Golden Spin of Zagreb where they finished 16th. They won a silver medal at the Belarusian national championships behind Viktoria Kavaliova and Yurii Bieliaiev.

They began the 2018-19 season by placing 10th at the 2018 CS Ondrej Nepela Trophy. Then they finished 4th at the 2018 Ice Star. Next, they won their first international medal by winning the silver medal at the 2018 Open d'Andorra. They competed at the 2018 CS Golden Spin of Zagreb where they finished 11th. They won the gold medal at the 2019 Belarusian national championships. Next, they finished 4th at the 2019 Mentor Toruń Cup. They then competed at the 2019 Open Ice Mall Cup where they finished 7th. The 2019 European Championships in Minsk were their first major international competition, and they advanced into the free dance with a personal best score in the rhythm dance. They ultimately finished 18th. They then competed at the 2019 World Championships in Saitama, Japan, and they placed 22nd in the rhythm dance, but only the top 20 teams qualified for the free dance.

Kublikova retired from figure skating in August 2019.

== Competitive highlights ==
CS: Challenger Series

=== With Hulitski ===
International
| Event | 2017–18 | 2018–19 |
|---|---|---|
| World Champ. | | 22nd |
| European Champ. | | 18th |
| CS Golden Spin | 16th | 11th |
| CS Ice Star | 12th | |
| CS Ondrej Nepela | | 10th |
| CS Warsaw Cup | 11th | |
| Ice Star | | 4th |
| Open d'Andorra | | 2nd |
| Open Ice Mall Cup | | 7th |
| Toruń Cup | | 4th |
| Volvo Open Cup | 7th | |
National
| Belarusian Champ. | 2nd | 1st |
