= Serafima Sakhanovich =

Russian figure skater (born 2000)

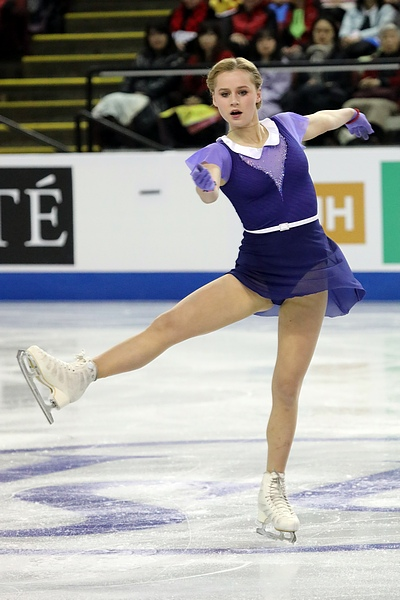
- Sakhanovich at the 2019 Skate Canada

Personal information
- Native name: Серафима Андреевна Саханович
- Full name: Serafima Andreyevna Sakhanovich
- Born: 9 February 2000 (age 26) Saint Petersburg, Russia
- Height: 1.60 m (5 ft 3 in)

Figure skating career
- Country: Russia
- Coach: Angelina Turenko
- Skating club: Olympic School St. Petersburg
- Began skating: 2007
- Retired: November 5, 2021
Medal record
Representing Russia
Figure skating: Ladies' singles
World Junior Championships
Silver medal – second place	2014 Sofia	Ladies' singles
Silver medal – second place	2015 Tallinn	Ladies' singles
Junior Grand Prix Final
Silver medal – second place	2013–14 Fukuoka	Ladies' singles
Silver medal – second place	2014–15 Barcelona	Ladies' singles

Serafima "Sima" Andreyevna Sakhanovich (Russian: Серафима Андреевна Саханович; born 9 February 2000) is a retired Russian figure skater. She is the 2017 C.S. Warsaw Cup champion, the 2018 C.S. Tallinn Trophy champion, and the 2019 Denis Ten Memorial champion.

On the junior level, she is a two-time Junior World silver medalist (2014-2015), a two-time Junior Grand Prix Final silver medalist, the 2013 JGP Estonia champion, the 2014 JGP Japan champion, the 2014 JGP Slovenia champion, and the 2014 Russian junior national champion.

== Personal life ==
Serafima "Sima" Andreyevna Sakhanovich was born 9 February 2000 in Saint Petersburg. She has two older sisters.

== Career ==
=== Early career ===
Sakhanovich began skating in 2007, coached from the start by Alina Pisarenko in Saint Petersburg.

Sakhanovich finished 12th at the 2012 Russian Junior Championships. At the 2013 Russian Championships, she placed fourth in her senior national debut and then won silver on the junior level behind Elena Radionova.

=== 2013–2014 season: First medal at Junior Worlds ===
Sakhanovich made her international debut in the 2013–2014 season. After placing fourth at the ISU Junior Grand Prix in Slovakia, she then won the gold medal in her next JGP event in Estonia. Her results qualified her for the JGP Final in Fukuoka, Japan, where she won the silver medal behind teammate Maria Sotskova. Sakhanovich finished sixth on the senior level at the Russian Championships and went on to win the junior national title ahead of Sotskova. She placed second in both segments at the 2014 World Junior Championships and was awarded the silver medal. Gold went to Elena Radionova and bronze to Evgenia Medvedeva, producing Russia's second consecutive sweep of the World Junior ladies' podium. She experienced pain in her right foot during the event but her condition improved after a month's rest.

Unable to find a sponsor in Saint Petersburg, Sakhanovich decided to relocate to Moscow, where she joined Eteri Tutberidze.

Sakhanovich at the 2014–15 Junior Grand Prix Final

=== 2014–2015 season: Second silver medal at Junior Worlds ===
Sakhanovich's first assignment of the 2014 JGP series was in Ljubljana, Slovenia. In the short program, she became the first female skater competing on the junior level to ever surpass the 40-point mark for TES and her overall score was the highest ever achieved in the Junior Grand Prix series by any lady skater. She won the gold medal ahead of Japan's Yuka Nagai. After another gold medal in Japan, she qualified for the 2014–15 JGP Final in Barcelona. In Spain, she won the silver medal behind teammate Evgenia Medvedeva after placing second in both segments.

Competing on the senior level at the 2015 Russian Championships, Sakhanovich placed 11th in the short program but 5th in the free skate, allowing her to move up to 5th overall. At the 2015 Russian Junior Nationals, she placed 4th in the short and second in the free on her way to the bronze medal. She made the team for the 2015 World Junior Championships in Tallinn, Estonia, where she won the silver medal behind Evgenia Medvedeva after placing second in the short and third in the free.

On 9 April 2015, R-Sport news agency reported that Sakhanovich had rejoined her former coach in Saint Petersburg, Alina Pisarenko, and that she hoped to master the quad Salchow in the following season. She said that she had changed coaches because her family was unable to live in two different cities at once.

=== 2015–2016 season: Senior international debut ===
Sakhanovich started her season by placing 7th at the 2015 JGP in Spain. She then made a coaching change, moving from Alina Pisarenko to Evgeni Rukavicin, and withdrew from the JGP in Croatia in order to adjust to her new training situation and to change her free program.

Making her senior international debut, Sakahnovich competed at two ISU Challenger Series events; she finished fourth at the 2015 CS Ice Challenge and took silver at the 2015 CS Warsaw Cup with a new season's best score of 176.41 points. Her results at both Russian Championships were the lowest of her career. After placing tenth at the senior event in December, she finished 17th at the junior event in January, having ranked last in the free skate with four falls on her jumps.

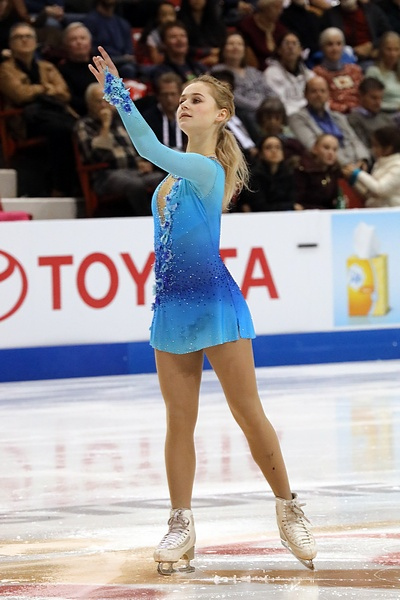
Sakhanovich performing at the 2017 Skate America

=== 2016–2017 season ===
Sakhanovich started her season by competing in two ISU Challenger Series events. In mid September she competed at the 2016 CS Nebelhorn Trophy where she placed 6th and in early October she competed at the 2016 CS Finlandia Trophy where she finished 8th.

Making her Grand Prix debut, Sakhanovich placed 7th at the 2016 Skate America. She then competed at the 2016 CS Tallinn Trophy where she won the silver medal behind her teammate Stanislava Konstantinova.

She finished 12th at the 2017 Russian Championships. She was coached by Evgeni Rukavicin in Saint Petersburg.

=== 2017–2018 season ===
In late September 2017, Sakhanovich changed coaches, deciding to join Evgeni Plushenko at his skating school in Moscow.

Sakhanovich competing at the 2019 Skate Canada

Sakhanovich started her season by winning two ISU Challenger Series medals. In late October she competed at the 2017 CS Minsk-Arena Ice Star where she won the silver medal behind Elizabet Tursynbayeva. She then skated at the 2017 CS Warsaw Cup where she won the gold medal.

She placed fifth at her Grand Prix assignment, 2017 Skate America, and ninth at the 2018 Russian Championships. In addition to Plushenko, she trained under Yulia Lavrenchuk until Lavrenchuk's departure at the end of the season. After returning to Saint Petersburg, Sakhanovich decided to be coached by Angelina Turenko.

=== 2018–2019 season ===
In mid-November, Sakhanovich skated at the 2018 CS Alpen Trophy, winning the silver medal behind her teammate Anna Tarusina. Two weeks later she competed at the 2018 CS Tallinn Trophy where she won the gold medal with a personal best score of 202.62 points. She did not compete at the 2019 Russian Championships, but later placed fifth at the Bavarian Open.

=== 2019–2020 season ===
Sakhanovich began the season at the inaugural Denis Ten Memorial Challenge in Almaty, winning the event. She received her first Grand Prix assignment in two years, the 2019 Skate Canada International, where she placed eighth. She placed twelfth at the 2020 Russian Championships.

Sakhanovich retired from competitive skating in November 2021.

=== 2026–2027 season: Comeback ===
During the off season, Sakhanovich posted videos of her performing quadruple Salchow jumps, speculating a potential comeback to the sport.

In October 2026, Sakhanovich made a comeback to competitive figure skating at the age of 26. She competed at a minor short program-only domestic event, "Ice Mystic" tournament in Moscow. She scored 55.97 points.

== Programs ==
Season	Short program	Free skating	Exhibition
2019–2020	Megapolis (Russian: Мегаполис) by Bel Suono choreo. by Angelina Turenko, Svetlana Korol	The Umbrellas of Cherbourg by Michel Legrand	
2018–2019	Charms (from W.E.) by Abel Korzeniowski	Adiós Nonino; Oblivion by Astor Piazzolla	
2017–2018	And The Waltz Goes On by Anthony Hopkins	Concierto de Aranjuez: Adagio by Joaquín Rodrigo	
2016–2017	Goodbye (from Hachi: A Dog's Tale) by Jan A. P. Kaczmarek choreo. by Olga Glinka	The Man With The Harmonica by Ennio Morricone remix by Apollo 440; Comptine d'un autre été : L'après-midi (from Amélie) by Yann Tiersen choreo. by Olga Glinka	
2015–2016	16 Tons by LeAnn Rimes; Can't Touch It by Ricki-Lee Coulter choreo. by Nikita Mikhailov	The Man With The Harmonica by Ennio Morricone remix by Apollo 440; Comptine d'un autre été : L'après-midi (from Amélie) by Yann Tiersen choreo. by Olga Glinka; Symphony No. 7 by Dmitri Shostakovich; Requiem by Wolfgang Amadeus Mozart choreo. by Nikita Mikhailov	
2014–2015	My Sweet and Tender Beast by Eugen Doga choreo. by Eteri Tutberidze	Oblivion by Astor Piazzolla; I Love You, I Hate You by Raúl Di Blasio choreo. by Eteri Tutberidze	Chandelier by Sia
2013–2014	Do Not Deny If You Are In Love (Russian: Не отрекаются любя) by Mark Minkov choreo. by Irina Sushchenko	Closed School by Mark Erman choreo. by Irina Sushchenko	Once Upon a December (from Anastasia) by Deana Carter
2012–2013	Once Upon a December (from Anastasia) by Deana Carter	Meeting with Wife (Russian: Встреча С Женой from Seventeen Moments of Spring) by Mikael Tariverdiev	Once Upon a December (from Anastasia) by Deana Carter
2011–2012	Russian folk music	Meeting with Wife (Russian: Встреча С Женой from Seventeen Moments of Spring) by Mikael Tariverdiev	
2010–2011	Russian folk music	Yakety Axe by Chet Atkins	
2009–2010	Swan Lake (modern version) by Pyotr Ilyich Tchaikovsky	Yakety Axe by Chet Atkins	

== Competitive highlights ==
GP: Grand Prix; CS: Challenger Series; JGP: Junior Grand Prix

International
Event	11–12	12–13	13–14	14–15	15–16	16–17	17–18	18–19	19–20
GP Skate America						7th	5th		
GP Skate Canada									8th
CS Alpen Trophy								2nd	
CS Finlandia						8th			
CS Ice Challenge					4th				
CS Ice Star							2nd		
CS Nebelhorn						6th			
CS Tallinn Trophy						2nd		1st	
CS Warsaw Cup					2nd		1st		4th
Bavarian Open								5th	
Denis Ten MC									1st
International: Junior
Junior Worlds			2nd	2nd					
JGP Final			2nd	2nd					
JGP Croatia					WD				
JGP Estonia			1st						
JGP Japan				1st					
JGP Slovakia			4th						
JGP Slovenia				1st					
JGP Spain					7th				
Volvo Open Cup			1st						
National
Russia		4th	6th	5th	10th	12th	9th		12th
Russia: Junior	12th	2nd	1st	3rd	17th				
WD = Withdrew

== Detailed results ==
=== Senior career ===
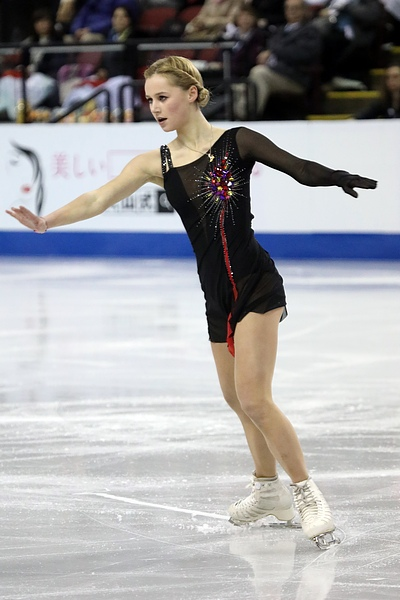
Sakhanovich at the 2019 Skate Canada

2019–20 season
Date	Event	SP	FS	Total
24–29 December 2019	2020 Russian Championships	10; 65.42	12; 121.98	12; 187.40
14–17 November 2019	2019 CS Warsaw Cup	6; 56.62	3; 121.65	4; 178.27
25–27 October 2019	2019 Skate Canada	7; 62.63	8; 113.34	8; 175.97
9–12 October 2019	2019 Denis Ten Memorial Challenge	1; 69.54	1; 114.91	1; 184.45
2018–19 season
Date	Event	SP	FS	Total
5–10 February 2019	2019 Bavarian Open	7; 53.23	5; 104.19	5; 157.42
26 November – 2 December 2018	2018 CS Tallinn Trophy	1; 70.33	1; 132.29	1; 202.62
11–18 November 2018	2018 CS Alpen Trophy	4; 58.16	2; 116.20	2; 174.36
2017–18 season
Date	Event	SP	FS	Total
21–24 December 2017	2018 Russian Championships	8; 67.58	10; 129.86	9; 197.44
24–26 November 2017	2017 Skate America	5; 66.28	5; 123.47	5; 189.75
16–19 November 2017	2017 CS Warsaw Cup	1; 61.23	1; 115.16	1; 176.39
26–29 October 2017	2017 CS Minsk-Arena Ice Star	2; 60.63	2; 113.86	2; 174.49
2016–17 season
Date	Event	SP	FS	Total
20–26 December 2016	2017 Russian Championships	13; 59.37	12; 116.16	12; 175.53
20–27 November 2016	2016 CS Tallinn Trophy	2; 60.78	2; 116.57	2; 177.35
21–23 October 2016	2016 Skate America	8; 56.52	7; 107.32	7; 163.84
6–10 October 2016	2016 CS Finlandia Trophy	14; 42.88	5; 100.49	8; 143.37
22–24 September 2016	2016 CS Nebelhorn Trophy	6; 52.69	5; 101.99	6; 154.68

=== Junior career ===
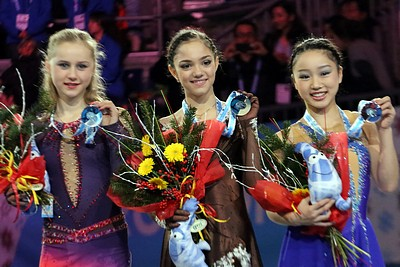
Sakhanovich at the 2014–15 Junior Grand Prix Final

2015–16 season
Date	Event	Level	SP	FS	Total
19–23 January 2016	2016 Russian Junior Championships	Junior	7; 61.46	18; 85.22	17; 146.68
24–27 December 2015	2016 Russian Championships	Senior	12; 59.59	11; 118.74	10; 178.33
26–29 November 2015	2015 Warsaw Cup	Senior	3; 53.89	2; 122.52	2; 176.41
27 October–1 November 2015	2015 Ice Challenge	Senior	5; 54.39	4; 103.34	4; 157.73
30 September–3 October 2015	2015 JGP Spain	Junior	4; 60.10	9; 92.36	7; 152.46
2014–15 season
Date	Event	Level	SP	FS	Total
2–8 March 2015	2015 World Junior Championships	Junior	2; 63.09	3; 123.06	2; 186.15
4–7 February 2015	2015 Russian Junior Championships	Junior	4; 62.60	2; 123.36	3; 185.96
24–27 December 2014	2015 Russian Championships	Senior	11; 59.21	5; 132.63	5; 191.84
11–14 December 2014	2014–15 ISU JGP Final	Junior	2; 66.05	2; 119.96	2; 186.01
10–14 September 2014	2014 ISU JGP Japan	Junior	2; 56.03	1; 121.66	1; 177.69
27–31 August 2014	2014 ISU JGP Slovenia	Junior	1; 66.58	1; 125.38	1; 191.96
2013–14 season
Date	Event	Level	SP	FS	Total
10–16 March 2014	2014 World Junior Championships	Junior	2; 64.75	2; 117.38	2; 182.13
23–25 January 2014	2014 Russian Junior Championships	Junior	1; 67.82	1; 128.96	1; 196.78
24–26 December 2013	2014 Russian Championships	Senior	7; 62.36	6; 121.22	6; 183.58
5–6 December 2013	2013–14 ISU JGP Final	Junior	2; 60.56	3; 112.30	2; 172.86
7–10 November 2013	2013 Volvo Open	Junior	1; 63.46	1; 126.69	1; 190.15
9–12 October 2013	2013 ISU JGP Estonia	Junior	4; 55.17	1; 109.31	1; 164.48
11–14 September 2013	2013 ISU JGP Slovakia	Junior	6; 49.24	3; 112.48	4; 161.72
2012–13 season
Date	Event	Level	SP	FS	Total
2–3 February 2013	2013 Russian Junior Championships	Junior	2; 67.49	2; 124.06	2; 191.55
25–28 December 2012	2013 Russian Championships	Senior	9; 56.50	4; 120.87	4; 177.37
2011–12 season
Date	Event	Level	SP	FS	Total
5–7 February 2012	2012 Russian Junior Championships	Junior	9; 50.28	11; 93.61	12; 143.89
