= Alisa Besseghier =

Ukrainian ice dancer (born 1991)

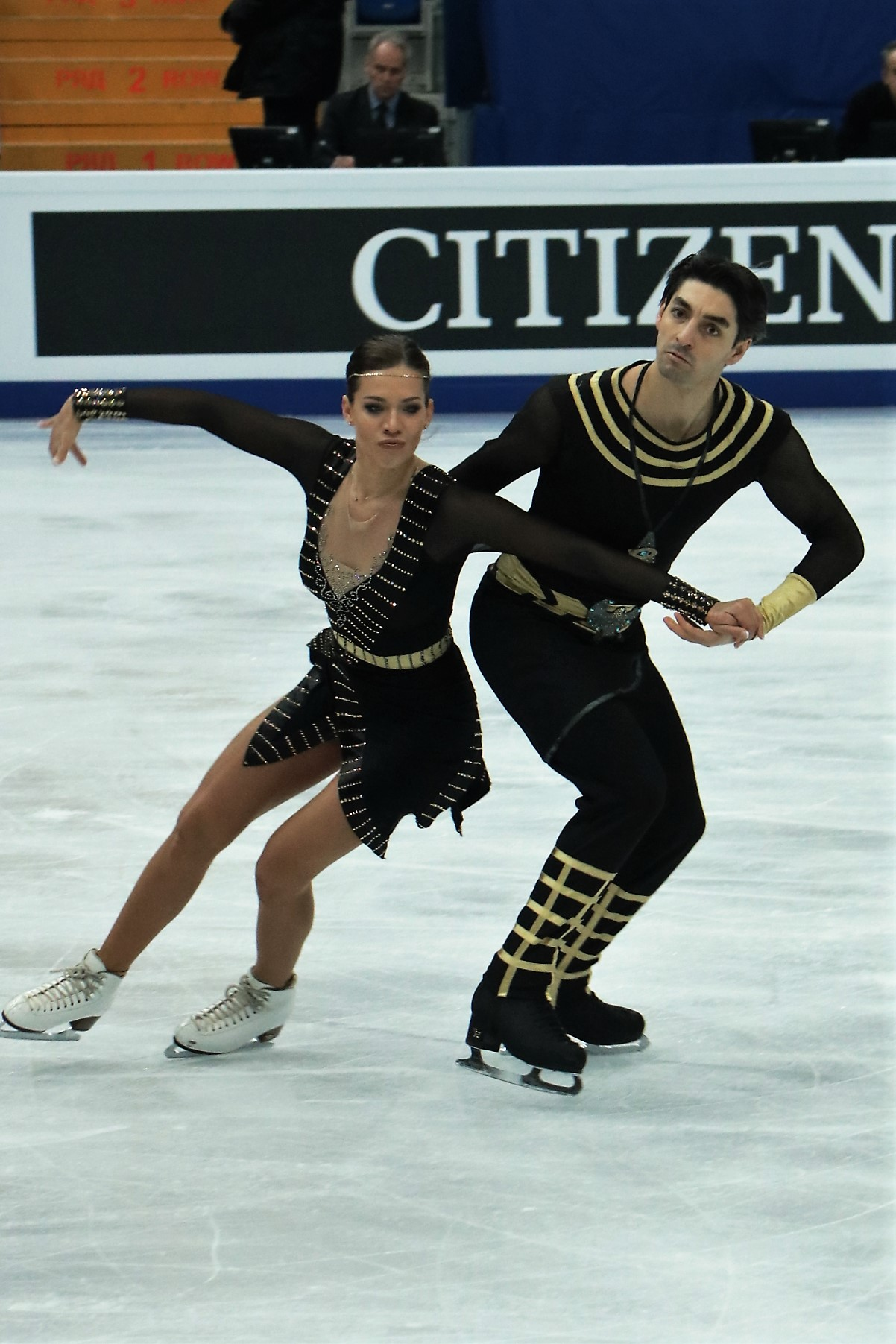
- Alisa Agafonova and Alper Uçar in 2018

Personal information
- Native name: Аліса Олександрівна Агафо́нова
- Full name: Alisa Alexandrovna Besseghier
- Other names: Alisa Agafonova
- Born: 15 January 1991 (age 35) Kharkiv, Ukrainian SSR, Soviet Union
- Home town: Detroit, Michigan, United States
- Height: 1.71 m (5 ft 7 in)

Figure skating career
- Country: Turkey
- Began skating: 1997
- Retired: 25 March 2018

Alisa Alexandrovna Besseghier (née Agafonova, Ukrainian: Аліса Олександрівна Агафо́нова, born 15 January 1991) is a former competitive ice dancer. She is best known for her partnership with Alper Uçar. Representing Turkey, they competed at two Winter Olympics (2014 and 2018) and won eight international medals, including silver at the 2011 Winter Universiade and three medals on the ISU Challenger Series. They skated in the final segment at six European Championships and four World Championships.

Competing with Dmitri Dun for Ukraine, Besseghier won five medals on the ISU Junior Grand Prix series and placed as high as 7th at the World Junior Championships (2008).

== Personal life ==
Besseghier was born on 15 January 1991 in Kharkiv, Ukraine. She studied business management at Kharkiv National University.

On 14 February 2020, she married French figure skater, Chafik Besseghier.

== Career ==
=== Early years ===
Besseghier began learning to skate in 1997. Her first coach was Valeriy Barats.

Besseghier teamed up with Dmitri Dun in 2001. They represented Ukraine and competed on the novice level before making their ISU Junior Grand Prix (JGP) debut in September 2004, in Harbin, China. At the time, they were coached by Halyna Churylova and Svetlana Chernikova in Kharkiv.

In 2006, Besseghier/Dun won their first JGP medal, silver, in Taipei. Svetlana Chernikova and Marina Zoueva were listed as their coaches in the 2006–2007 and 2007–2008 seasons. In 2007–2008, they placed 4th at one JGP event, took silver at another, and finished 6th at the Junior Grand Prix Final. They placed 7th at the 2008 World Junior Championships in Sofia, Bulgaria.

In 2008–2009, Besseghier/Dun were coached by Chernikova, Zoueva, and Alexander Gorshkov. After winning gold and silver on the JGP series, they qualified to the JGP Final, where they finished 7th. Having won the Ukrainian national junior title, they were sent to the 2009 World Junior Championships and finished 13th in Sofia.

Coached by Gorshkov and Chernikova in Moscow, Besseghier/Dun won bronze at the 2009 JGP event in Minsk. After placing fourth at the JGP in Istanbul, in October 2009, they decided to end their partnership.

=== First three seasons with Uçar ===
In 2010, Besseghier teamed up with Alper Uçar to compete for Turkey. They won a silver medal at the 2011 Winter Universiade, skating in their first season together.

Besseghier/Uçar placed 26th at the 2012 European Championships in Sheffield, England, and 31st at the 2012 World Championships in Nice, France.

Besseghier/Uçar were originally coached by Natalia Dubova and Oleg Voyko in Stamford, Connecticut. They changed coaches in December 2012, deciding to join Alexander Zhulin and Oleg Volkov in Moscow, Russia. They placed 13th at the 2013 European Championships in Zagreb, Croatia, and 28th at the 2013 World Championships in London, Ontario, Canada.

=== 2013–2014 season ===
Besseghier/Uçar began their season at the 2013 Nebelhorn Trophy, the final Olympic qualifying opportunity. By finishing 5th, they earned a spot for Turkey in the ice dancing event at the Olympics. They then won a silver medal at the 2013 NRW Trophy.

Besseghier/Uçar finished 17th at the 2014 European Championships in Budapest, Hungary. In February, the two competed at the 2014 Winter Olympics in Sochi, Russia; their short dance placement, 22nd, was insufficient to advance to the next segment. They qualified to the free dance and finished 20th overall at the 2014 World Championships, which took place in March in Saitama, Japan.

=== 2014–2015 season ===
In December, Besseghier/Uçar won silver at the Santa Claus Cup in Hungary. In January, they took silver at the Toruń Cup in Poland and placed 12th at the 2015 European Championships in Stockholm, Sweden. In March, they achieved their career-best world placement, 16th, at the 2015 World Championships in Shanghai, China.

=== 2015–2016 season ===
Making their Grand Prix debut, Besseghier/Uçar placed 7th at the 2015 Trophée Éric Bompard in November. In December 2015, the two moved to Bloomfield Hills, Michigan to work with Anjelika Krylova and Pasquale Camerlengo due to visa problems which were exacerbated following the 2015 Russian Sukhoi Su-24 shootdown.

They finished 12th at the 2016 European Championships in Bratislava, Slovakia, and 21st at the 2016 World Championships in Boston, United States.

=== 2016–2017 season ===
Besseghier/Uçar received two Grand Prix assignments; they placed 9th at the 2016 Skate America and 8th at the 2016 Rostelecom Cup. They ranked 11th at the 2017 European Championships in Ostrava, Czech Republic. It was the best continental result of their career.

The two finished 17th at the 2017 World Championships in Helsinki, Finland. Due to their result, Turkey qualified a spot in the ice dancing event at the 2018 Winter Olympics.

=== 2017–2018 season ===
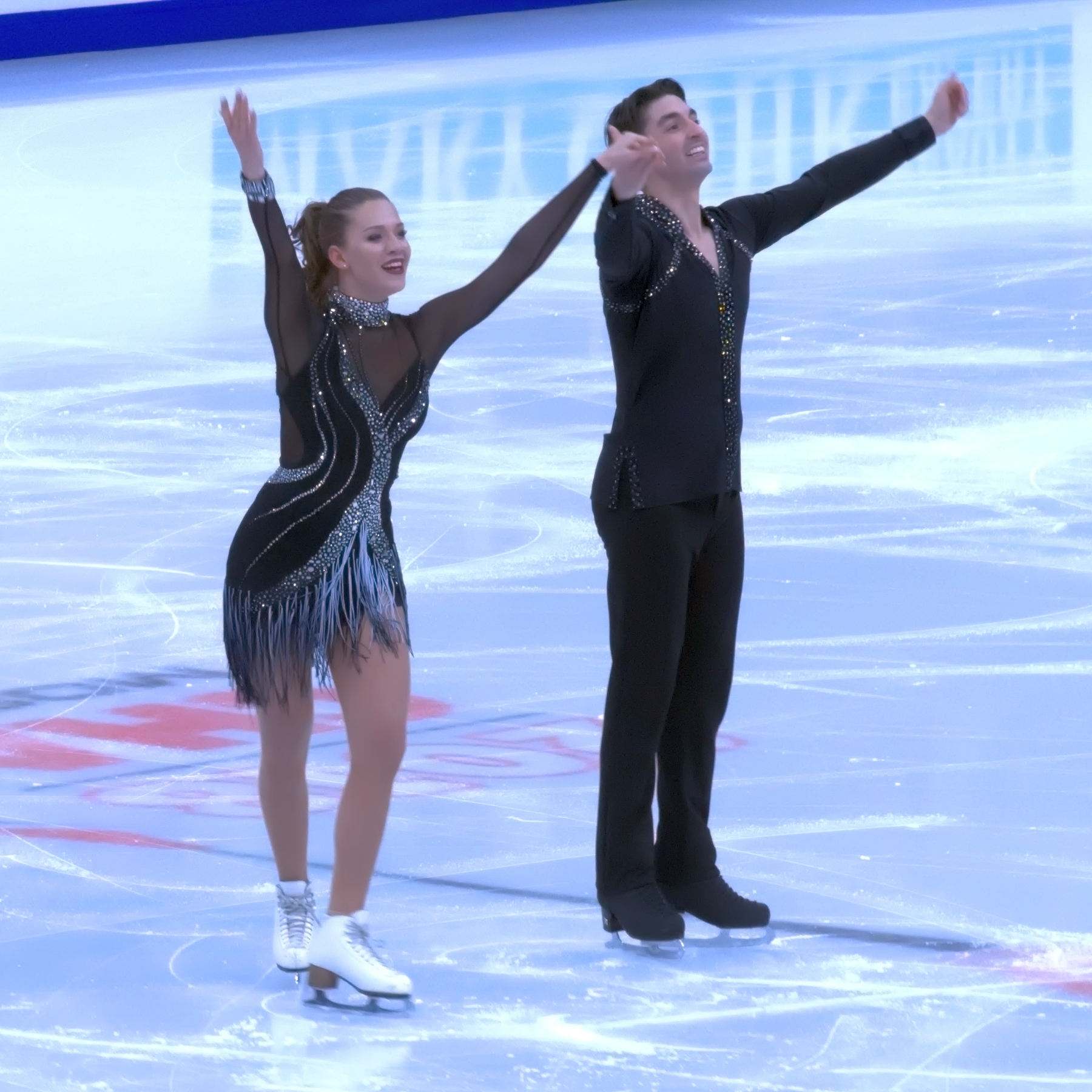
Agafonova/Uçar at the 2018 European Championships in Moscow

Besseghier/Uçar competed at two Grand Prix events and then won silver at the 2017 CS Tallinn Trophy. In January, they finished 13th at the 2018 European Championships in Moscow, Russia. In February, the two competed at the 2018 Winter Olympics and qualified to the final segment. They ranked 20th in the short dance, 18th in the free dance, and 19th overall in Pyeongchang, South Korea. They had the same result at the 2018 World Championships in Milan, Italy. They announced their retirement from competitive skating on March 25, 2018.

== Programs ==
=== With Uçar ===
Season	Short dance	Free dance	Exhibition
2017–2018	Samba: Cuba by DJ Rebel ft. Gibson Brothers; Rhumba: How Deep Is Your Love (DJ Maksy Remix) by Sophia Guem; Samba: Cuba by DJ Rebel ft. Gibson Brothers	Marco Polo by Loreena McKennitt; Cleopatra by Maxime Rodriguez; Iron by Woodkid	
2016–2017	Blues: Why Don't You Do Right? performed by Amy Irving; Jive: Straight to... Number One by Touch and Go	Near Light by Ólafur Arnalds; Beethoven's Five Secrets by The Piano Guys; Sand by Nathan Lanier	
2015–2016	Waltz: Until...; Foxtrot: Moon over Bourbon Street by Sting	Preserved Figs ("Incir Receli") by Engin Bayrak	Say Something by A Great Big World, Christina Aguilera
2014–2015	Flamenco: Babaylon by Gaudi; Paso Doble: Fuegos by Puro Latino; Flamenco: Bailando bajo la luna by Chiquita Herrada	Piano Concert No. 23 by Wolfgang Amadeus Mozart; Penser l'impossible (from Mozart Rock Opera)	
2013–2014	Quickstep: Stepping Out With My Baby by Frank Devol; Foxtrot; Quickstep	Black and Blue by Dave Brubeck; I Feel Good by James Brown	
2012–2013	Fairytale by Alexander Rybak	Muhteşem Yüzyil (Magnificent Century) by Fahir Atakoglu	
2011–2012	La vida es un carnaval; Historia de un amor; Baila baila conmigo	Summertime performed by Victoria Pierre-Marie; Istanbul Pas Constantinople by Ayhan Sicimoglu	
2011–2012	Waltz; Oblivion Tango by Astor Piazzolla	Be Italian (from Nine) by Fergie	

=== With Dun ===
Season	Original dance	Free dance
2009–2010	Gandzya (Ukrainian folk dance)	Blues for Klook by Eddy Louiss
2008–2009	Puttin' On the Ritz by Irving Berlin	Aurora by Valeriy Tyshler
2007–2008	Verkhovyno (Ukrainian folk dance)	Harem performed by Sarah Brightman
2006–2007	Tanguera by Astor Piazzolla	Pirates of the Caribbean by Klaus Badelt
2004–2005	Black Bottom; Torero; Fish and Chips	Spring Tango by Astor Piazzolla arranged by P. Nicholson

== Competitive highlights ==
- GP – Event of the ISU Grand Prix Series
- JGP – Event of the ISU Junior Grand Prix Series
- CS – Event of the ISU Challenger Series

=== With Alper Uçar (for Turkey) ===
Competition placements at senior level
Season	2010–11	2011–12	2012–13	2013–14	2014–15	2015–16	2016–17	2017–18
Winter Olympics				22nd				19th
World Championships		31st	28th	20th	16th	21st	17th	19th
European Championships		26th	13th	17th	12th	12th	11th	13th
GP Rostelecom Cup							8th	9th
GP Skate America							9th	
GP Skate Canada								10th
GP Trophée de France						7th		
CS Denkova-Staviski Cup						1st		
CS Golden Spin of Zagreb		9th		3rd			3rd	7th
CS Ice Challenge	6th		12th		6th			
CS Mordovian Ornament						4th		
CS Nebelhorn Trophy		11th		5th		6th		
CS Tallinn Trophy							4th	2nd
CS U.S. Classic							7th	
CS Warsaw Cup					5th			6th
Bavarian Open			6th					
Crystal Skate of Romania			5th					
Cup of Nice		8th						
Ice Star							2nd	
Istanbul Cup		4th						1st
Mentor Toruń Cup			4th		2nd			
Mont Blanc Trophy	5th							
NRW Trophy	7th	9th	9th	2nd		1st		
Santa Claus Cup					2nd			
Winter Universiade	2nd							

=== With Dun for Ukraine ===
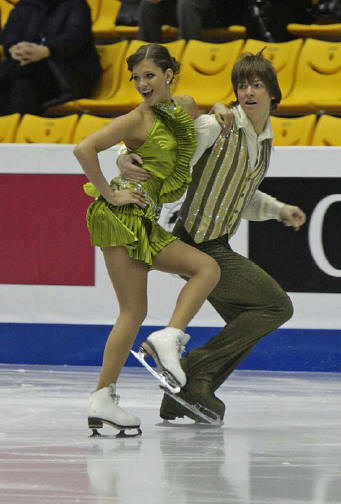
Agafonova and Dun in 2008

International
Event	04–05	05–06	06–07	07–08	08–09	09–10
Junior Worlds				7th	13th	
JGP Final				6th	7th	
JGP Belarus					1st	3rd
JGP China	7th					
JGP Estonia				2nd		
JGP France			4th			
JGP Germany	10th			4th		
JGP Poland		10th				
JGP Taiwan			2nd			
JGP Turkey						4th
JGP U.K.					2nd	
Pavel Roman				2nd J		
National
Ukrainian Champ.	6th J				1st J	
