= The Bolt (Shostakovich) =

1931 ballet by Dmitri Shostakovich

The Bolt (Russian: Болт), Op. 27, is a ballet music score written by Dmitri Shostakovich between 1930 and 1931 to a libretto by Victor Smirnov. The humorous and satirical full-length ballet in three acts and seven scenes was choreographed by Fyodor Lopukhov and premiered on 8 April 1931 at the State Academic Theatre of Opera and Ballet in Leningrad. It was not performed again until 2005, when a two-act choreography by Alexei Ratmansky was performed at the Bolshoi Theatre in Moscow.

== Plot ==
The ballet is an ironic tale of slovenly work in a Soviet factory. The lazy Lyonka hates work and together with a local priest and anti-Soviet plotter he plans to sabotage the machinery by putting a bolt in it. Their plan is foiled by a group of Young Communists.

== Instrumentation ==
The list below details the instrumentation for the more commonly performed suite compiled by Shostakovich.

- Woodwinds: piccolo, 2 flutes (2nd doubling piccolo), 2 oboes, cor anglais, 2 B♭ clarinets, E♭ clarinet (doubling bass clarinet), 2 bassoons, double bassoon
- Brass: 6 French horns, 3 trumpets, 3 trombones, 1 baritone or euphonium, 1 tuba
- Percussion: timpani, bass drum, cymbals, snare drum, triangle, tambourine, tam-tam, glockenspiel, xylophone
- Strings: violins, violas, cellos, double basses

Additional instruments used in the full ballet but not in the suite include: 2 pianos (onstage and pit), harp, tubular bell in D, wood block, police whistle, and an offstage selection of instruments drawn from the orchestra in the first act (3 trumpets, 3 trombones, tuba, cymbals). The second clarinettist also doubles alto saxophone in Eb. A male chorus (TTBB) and narrator are also required in some movements.

Additional optional brass band (Finale): E♭ cornet, 2 B♭ cornets, 2 trumpets, 2 tenor horns, 2 baritone horns, 2 tubas. The 2002 Naxos recording of the suite extracted from this ballet, performed by the Russian State Symphony Orchestra, uses four saxophones here instead.

== Reception ==
The premiere was the only performance for 74 years, as the audience jeered it and the critics upbraided it for its un-Soviet intentions. Along with his other ballets The Limpid Stream and The Golden Age, the work was banned by the authorities after Shostakovich's first denunciation in 1936. He subsequently put parts of it in his other music.

The waspish and delightfully colourful score bowls along like a children’s cartoon-film, every number full of drama and parody and fine take-offs of serious and popular music of every kind. Among the highlights are the opening scene when the workers gather in the morning for their physical fitness class before hitting the conveyor belts, the appearance of pompous and opinionated officials and bureaucrats, a ridiculous church-going episode, and the exciting scene when the sabotage-conspiracy nearly succeeds and is only foiled at the last moment. There are also plenty of numbers which mimic the whirling and hammering sounds of modern factory machinery.

— Gerard McBurney

== Suite ==
Shostakovich extracted a suite from the ballet, Op. 27a, with eight movements:

1. Overture (Introduction)
2. The Bureaucrat (Polka)
3. The Drayman's Dance (Variations)
4. Kozelkov's Dance with Friends (Tango)
5. Intermezzo
6. The Dance of the Colonial Slave-Girl
7. The Conciliator
8. General Dance of Enthusiasm and Apotheosis (Finale)
