= 2012 Nebelhorn Trophy =

- Type: Senior International
- Date: September 27 – 29
- Season: 2012–13
- Location: Oberstdorf
- Venue: Eislaufzentrum Oberstdorf

Champions
- Men's singles: (Japan) Nobunari Oda
- Ladies' singles: (Canada) Kaetlyn Osmond
- Pairs: (Russia) Tatiana Volosozhar / Maxim Trankov
- Ice dance: (United States) Madison Chock / Evan Bates
- Previous: 2011 Nebelhorn Trophy
- Next: 2013 Nebelhorn Trophy

The 2012 Nebelhorn Trophy was held on September 27–29, 2012 at the Eislaufzentrum Oberstdorf. The event is held annually in Oberstdorf, Germany and is named after the Nebelhorn, a nearby mountain.

It is one of the first international senior competitions of the season. Skaters are entered by their respective national federations and compete in four disciplines: men's singles, ladies' singles, pair skating, and ice dance. The Fritz-Geiger-Memorial Trophy is presented to the team with the highest placements across all disciplines.

== Entries ==
Country	Men	Ladies	Pairs	Ice dance
Australia	Mark Webster	Brooklee Han		
Austria		Kerstin Frank		Kira Geil / Tobias Eisenbauer
Azerbaijan				Julia Zlobina / Alexei Sitnikov
Belarus	Vitali Luchanok			
Belgium	Jorik Hendrickx			
Brazil	Kevin Alves; Luiz Manella	Isadora Williams		
Canada	Elladj Balde; Andrei Rogozine	Kaetlyn Osmond		Alexandra Paul / Mitchell Islam; Kharis Ralph / Asher Hill
Czech Republic	Michal Březina; Tomáš Verner	Eliška Březinová		Gabriela Kubová / Dmitri Kiselev; Lucie Myslivečková / Neil Brown
Estonia		Jelena Glebova		
Finland	Valtter Virtanen	Rosaliina Kuparinen; Juulia Turkkila; Nea Viiri		
France			Daria Popova / Bruno Massot; Vanessa James / Morgan Ciprès	Pernelle Carron / Lloyd Jones; Tiffany Zahorski / Alexis Miart
Germany	Paul Fentz; Peter Liebers	Sarah Hecken; Nathalie Weinzierl	Mari Vartmann / Aaron Van Cleave	Nelli Zhiganshina / Alexander Gazsi
Hungary				Zsuzsanna Nagy / Máté Fejes
Israel	Alexei Bychenko		Danielle Montalbano / Evgeni Krasnopolski	Allison Reed / Vasili Rogov
Italy	Paolo Bacchini; Paul Bonifacio Parkinson	Carol Bressanutti		Federica Bernardi / Christopher Mior
Japan	Nobunari Oda	Haruka Imai		Emi Hirai / Marien de la Asuncion
Kazakhstan	Denis Ten			
Lithuania				Isabella Tobias / Deividas Stagniūnas
Luxembourg		Fleur Maxwell		
Mexico		Reyna Hamui		
Philippines	Michael Christian Martinez			
Poland	Maciej Cieplucha			
Puerto Rico		Victoria Muniz		
Romania	Zoltán Kelemen			
Russia	Ivan Bariev; Zhan Bush	Polina Shelepen; Adelina Sotnikova	Vera Bazarova / Yuri Larionov; Tatiana Volosozhar / Maxim Trankov	Ksenia Monko / Kirill Khaliavin
Serbia		Marina Seeh		
Slovakia		Dominika Murckova		Federica Testa / Lukáš Csölley
South Africa		Lejeanne Marais		
Spain				Sara Hurtado / Adrià Díaz
Sweden	Alexander Majorov	Viktoria Helgesson	Ronja Roll / Gustav Forsgren	
Switzerland		Romy Bühler		Ramona Elsener / Florian Roost
Ukraine	Yakov Godorozha			Siobhan Heekin-Canedy / Dmitri Dun
United Kingdom	Phillip Harris			Charlotte Aiken / Josh Whidborne
United States	Stephen Carriere; Keegan Messing	Caroline Zhang	Caydee Denney / John Coughlin; Gretchen Donlan / Andrew Speroff	Madison Chock / Evan Bates

== Results ==
=== Men ===
Japan's Nobunari Oda returned from injury to win gold at Nebelhorn, while Russia's Konstantin Menshov took silver, and the United States' Keegan Messing took bronze.

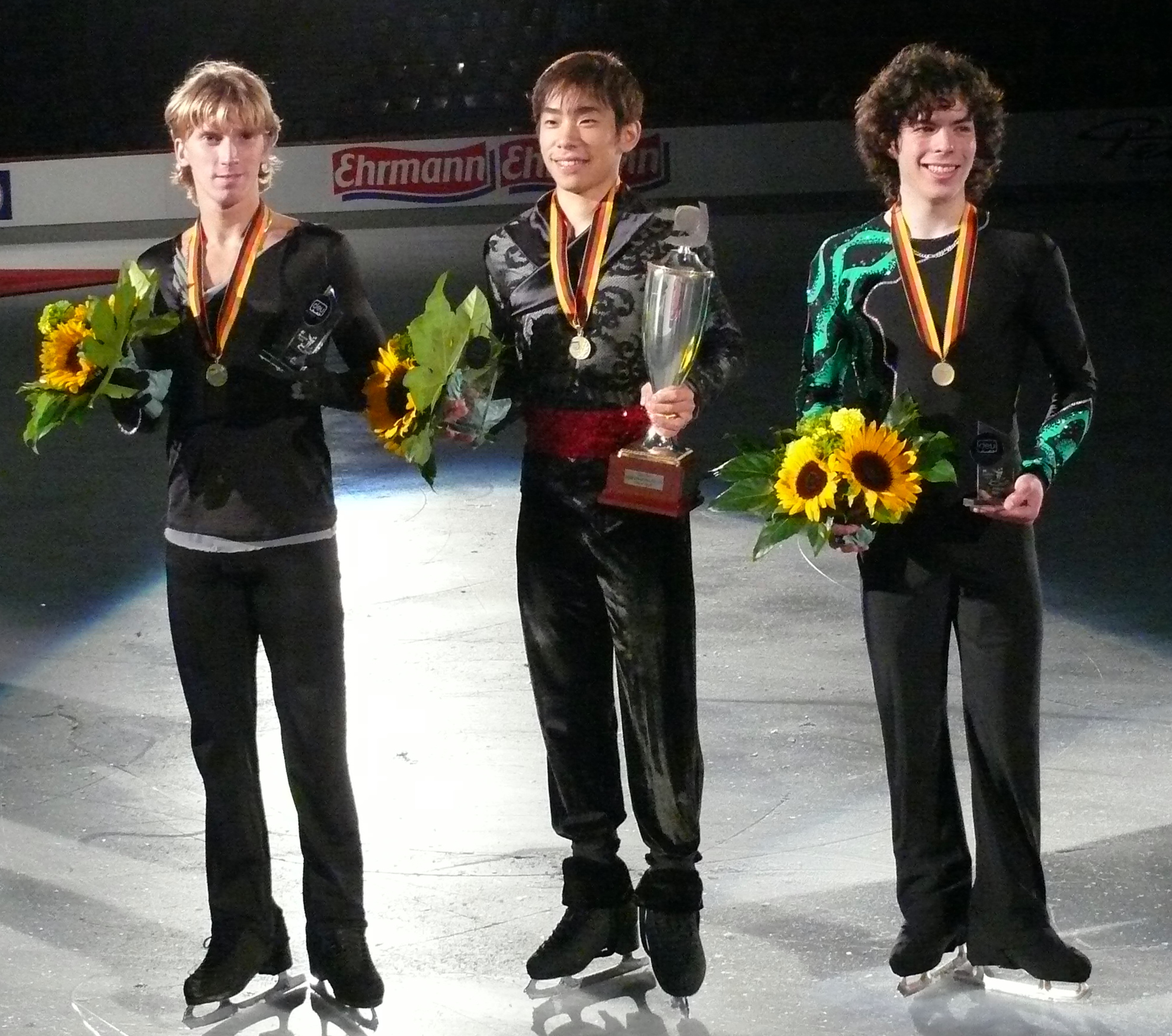
Men's medalists. From left: Menshov, Oda, Messing

Rank	Name	Nation	Total points	SP		FS	
1	Nobunari Oda	Japan	233.33	1	79.64	1	153.69
2	Konstantin Menshov	Russia	212.94	2	69.30	2	143.64
3	Keegan Messing	United States	210.78	3	68.56	4	142.22
4	Stephen Carriere	United States	209.11	8	65.68	3	143.43
5	Michal Březina	Czech Republic	201.71	5	67.78	7	133.93
6	Tomáš Verner	Czech Republic	199.98	10	60.69	5	139.29
7	Denis Ten	Kazakhstan	198.39	4	67.88	8	130.51
8	Ivan Bariev	Russia	196.54	11	60.05	6	136.49
9	Andrei Rogozine	Canada	196.27	7	67.31	9	128.96
10	Peter Liebers	Germany	195.59	6	67.41	10	128.18
11	Paul Bonifacio Parkinson	Italy	179.25	12	58.93	11	120.32
12	Alexander Majorov	Sweden	175.22	9	61.55	14	113.67
13	Paolo Bacchini	Italy	175.04	13	60.69	13	118.57
14	Elladj Baldé	Canada	171.83	18	54.41	12	119.82
15	Alexei Bychenko	Israel	165.59	17	53.29	15	112.30
16	Paul Fentz	Germany	163.15	16	53.44	16	109.71
17	Maciej Cieplucha	Poland	154.95	22	47.51	17	107.44
18	Phillip Harris	United Kingdom	154.80	14	52.01	18	100.39
19	Yakov Godorozha	Ukraine	148.81	15	51.41	19	94.47
20	Zoltán Kelemen	Romania	142.10	21	48.68	20	93.42
21	Vitali Luchanok	Belarus	141.11	20	48.68	21	91.43
22	Valtter Virtanen	Finland	136.97	19	51.41	22	85.56
23	Luiz Manella	Brazil	131.96	23	47.33	23	84.63
24	Mark Webster	Australia	117.05	24	40.53	24	76.52

=== Ladies ===
Canada's Kaetlyn Osmond won her first senior international title, Russia's Adelina Sotnikova took the silver, and Japan's Haruka Imai won bronze.

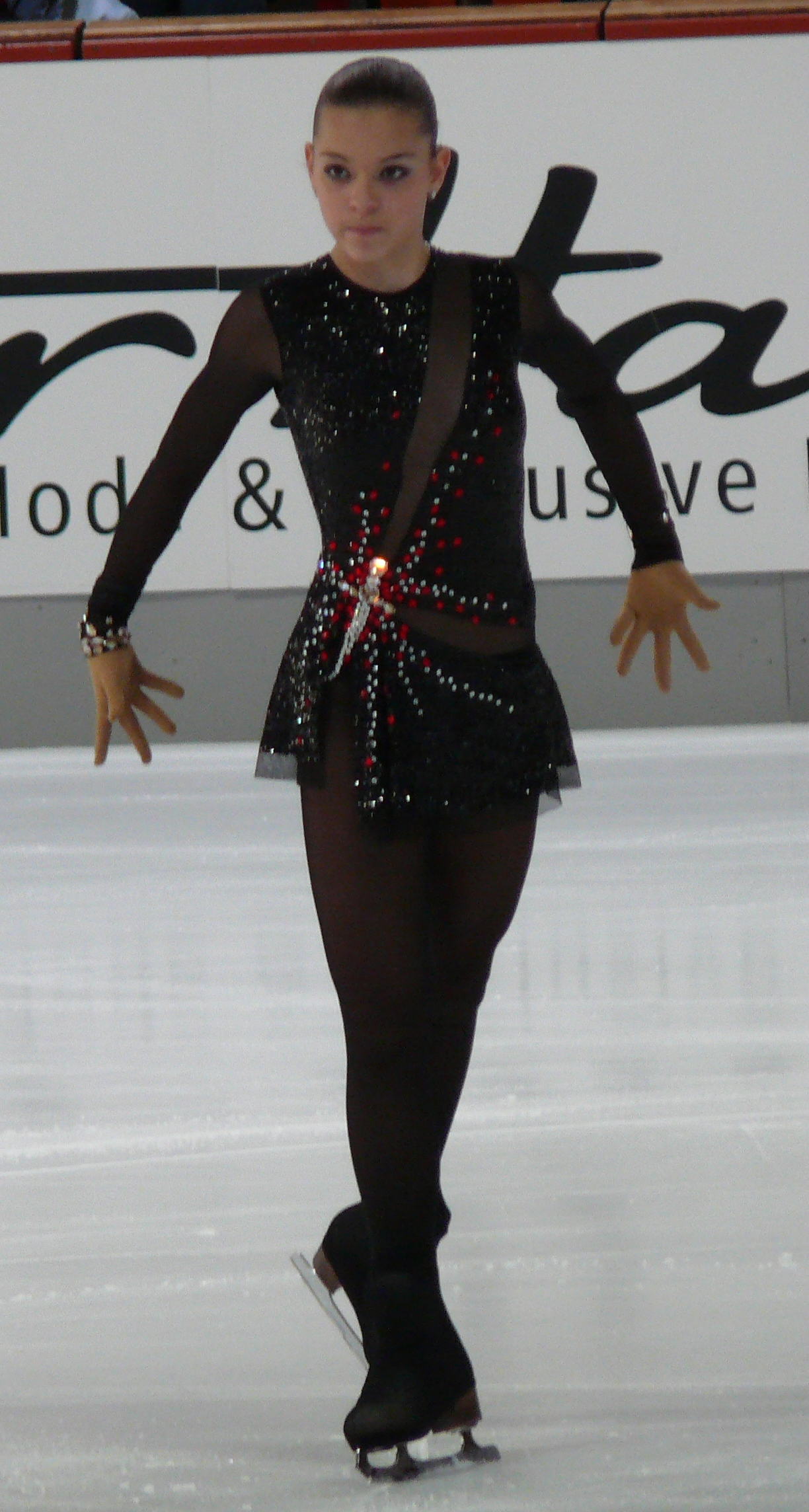
Silver medalist Adelina Sotnikova performs her short program

Rank	Name	Nation	Total points	SP		FS	
1	Kaetlyn Osmond	Canada	170.19	2	55.68	1	114.51
2	Adelina Sotnikova	Russia	168.23	1	58.48	2	109.75
3	Haruka Imai	Japan	153.64	9	47.70	3	105.94
4	Jelena Glebova	Estonia	152.36	3	54.26	4	98.10
5	Polina Shelepen	Russia	147.59	4	53.63	6	93.96
6	Viktoria Helgesson	Sweden	145.16	7	48.17	5	96.99
7	Nathalie Weinzierl	Germany	142.96	5	49.64	7	93.32
8	Brooklee Han	Australia	142.02	6	49.08	8	92.94
9	Juulia Turkkila	Finland	137.36	8	47.70	9	89.66
10	Sarah Hecken	Germany	125.66	11	43.12	11	82.54
11	Isadora Williams	Brazil	124.91	12	41.96	10	82.95
12	Caroline Zhang	United States	124.13	10	45.43	12	78.70
13	Kerstin Frank	Austria	114.35	13	41.60	16	72.75
14	Reyna Hamui	Mexico	114.03	14	40.04	15	73.99
15	Fleur Maxwell	Luxembourg	110.92	17	36.10	14	74.82
16	Eliška Březinová	Czech Republic	109.42	20	34.22	13	75.20
17	Carol Bressanutti	Italy	105.26	15	39.16	17	66.10
18	Marina Seeh	Serbia	102.68	16	37.11	18	65.57
19	Nea Viiri	Finland	99.31	19	35.02	19	64.29
20	Rosaliina Kuparinen	Finland	97.45	18	35.12	20	62.33
21	Lejeanne Marais	South Africa	91.10	22	29.64	21	61.46
22	Dominika Murckova	Slovakia	83.84	21	30.76	22	53.08

=== Pairs ===
Russia's Tatiana Volosozhar / Maxim Trankov repeated as Nebelhorn champions, while the United States' Caydee Denney / John Coughlin took silver and France's Vanessa James / Morgan Cipres won bronze, their first international medal. There were two withdrawals following the short program – Russia's Vera Bazarova / Yuri Larionov withdrew due to a recurrence of an injury to Bazarova's right hip, while Germany's Mari Vartmann picked into her right foot when she fell on a throw triple loop during the short and was unable to put on her skate the next day due to swelling.

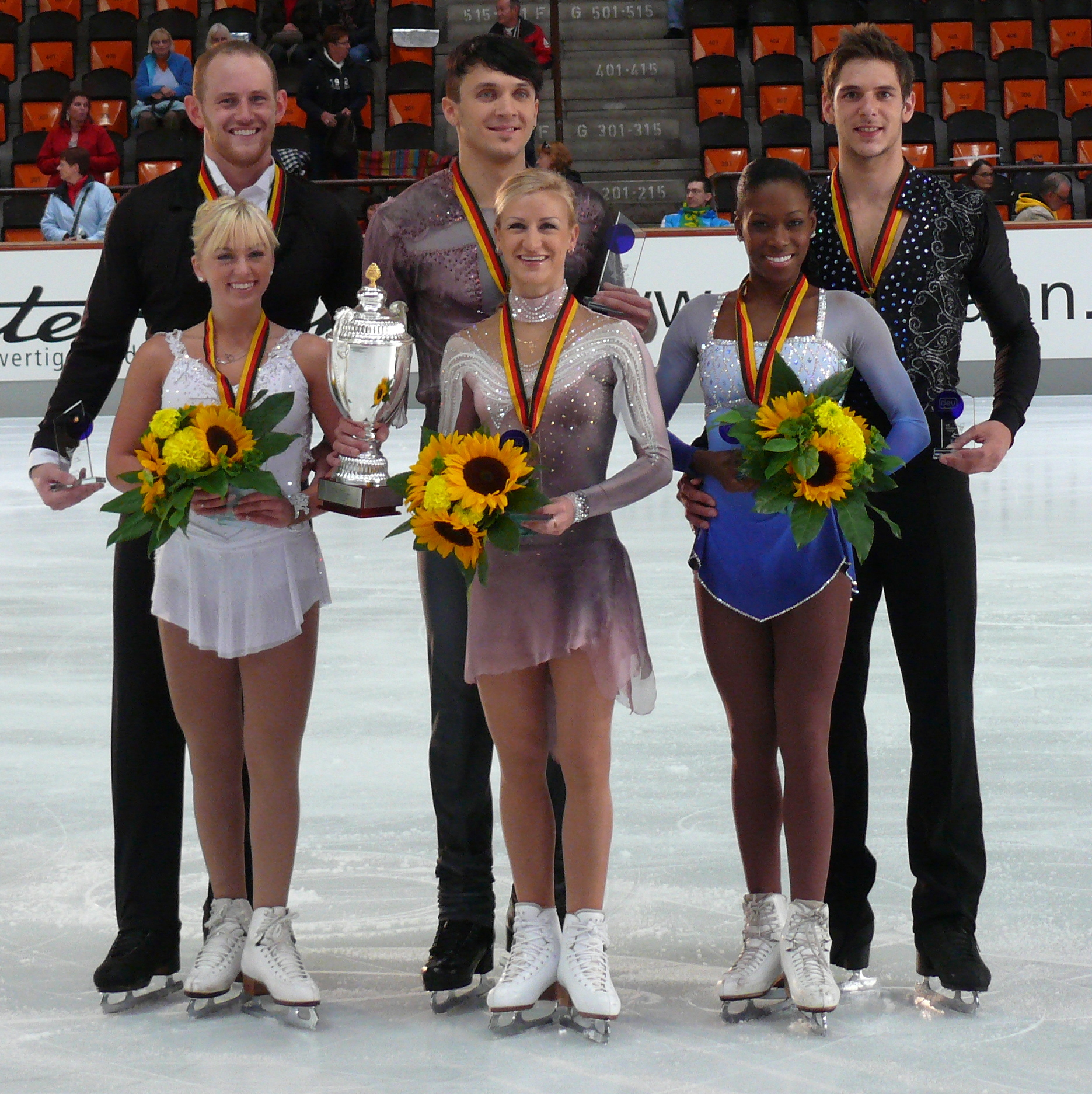
Pairs' medalists. From left: Denney / Coughlin, Volosozhar / Trankov, James / Ciprès

Rank	Name	Nation	Total points	SP		FS	
1	Tatiana Volosozhar / Maxim Trankov	Russia	196.55	1	65.24	1	131.31
2	Caydee Denney / John Coughlin	United States	178.90	2	57.29	2	121.61
3	Vanessa James / Morgan Ciprès	France	151.52	3	55.00	4	96.52
4	Gretchen Donlan / Andrew Speroff	United States	145.35	6	43.21	3	102.14
5	Daria Popova / Bruno Massot	France	132.68	5	47.44	5	85.24
6	Danielle Montalbano / Evgeni Krasnopolski	Israel	110.31	8	34.68	6	75.63
7	Ronja Roll / Gustav Forsgren	Sweden	94.48	9	34.49	7	59.99
WD	Vera Bazarova / Yuri Larionov	Russia		4	52.43		
WD	Mari Vartmann / Aaron Van Cleave	Germany		7	37.50		

=== Ice dance ===
Madison Chock / Evan Bates of the United States won their first international title, while Julia Zlobina / Alexander Sitnikov of Azerbaijan took the silver, and Germany's Nelli Zhiganshina / Alexander Gazsi dropped from first after the short dance to finish third overall.

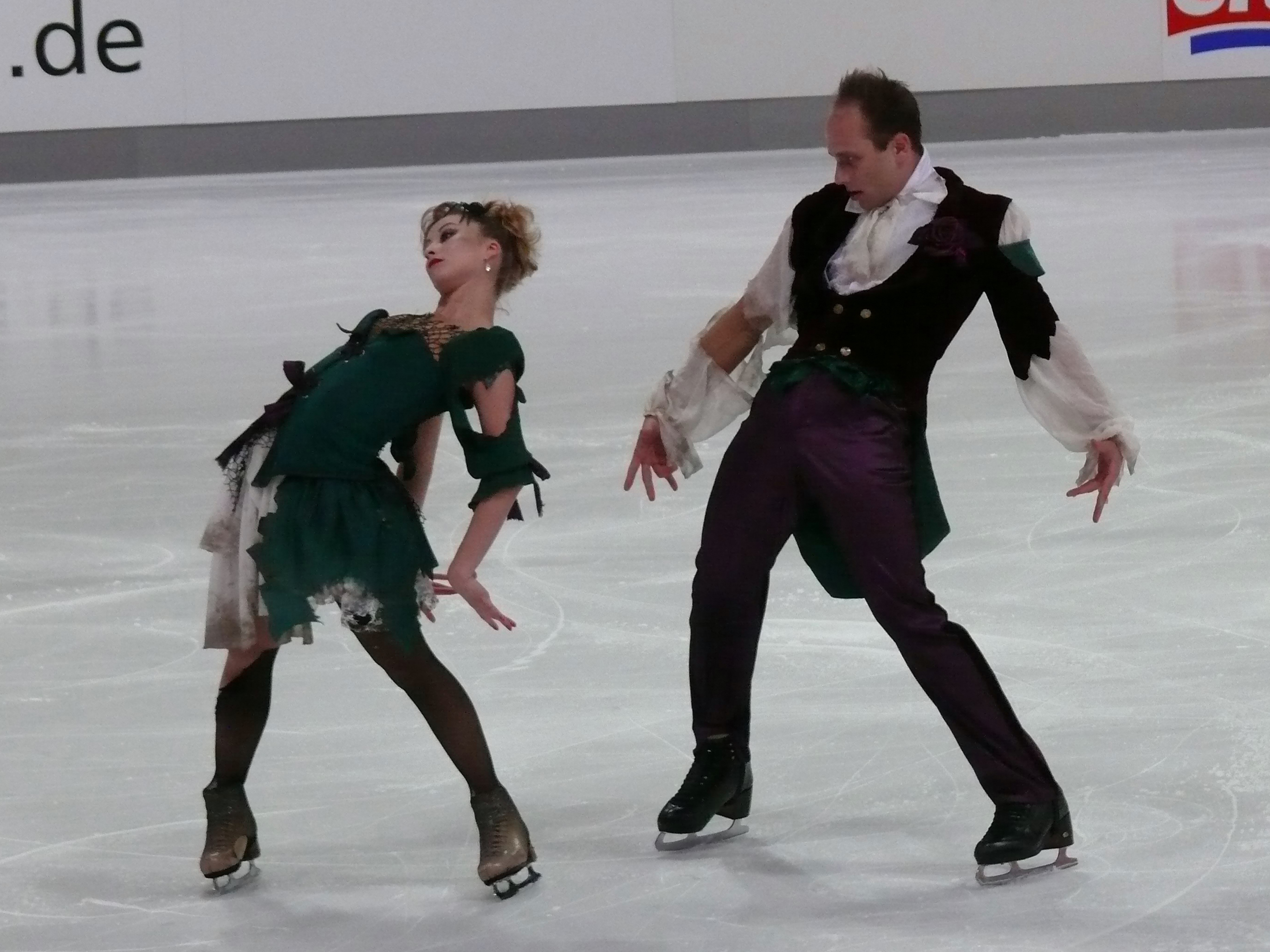
Bronze medalists Zhiganshina / Gazsi perform their zombie-themed free dance

Rank	Name	Nation	Total points	SD		FD	
1	Madison Chock / Evan Bates	United States	147.79	2	56.97	1	90.82
2	Julia Zlobina / Alexei Sitnikov	Azerbaijan	143.59	3	56.95	2	86.64
3	Nelli Zhiganshina / Alexander Gazsi	Germany	142.00	1	59.58	5	82.42
4	Ksenia Monko / Kirill Khaliavin	Russia	139.70	4	54.92	3	84.78
5	Alexandra Paul / Mitchell Islam	Canada	137.92	5	54.50	4	83.42
6	Siobhan Heekin-Canedy / Dmitri Dun	Ukraine	132.61	6	54.44	6	78.17
7	Kharis Ralph / Asher Hill	Canada	130.42	7	53.79	7	76.63
8	Ramona Elsener / Florian Roost	Switzerland	118.33	9	46.62	9	71.71
9	Sara Hurtado / Adrià Díaz	Spain	118.11	11	45.68	8	72.43
10	Lucie Myslivečková / Neil Brown	Czech Republic	117.49	8	47.73	12	69.76
11	Charlotte Aiken / Josh Whidborne	United Kingdom	116.69	10	46.12	11	70.57
12	Federica Bernardi / Christopher Mior	Italy	114.89	12	43.90	10	70.99
13	Allison Reed / Vasili Rogov	Israel	107.32	13	42.54	13	64.78
14	Emi Hirai / Marien de la Asuncion	Japan	103.50	14	41.82	14	61.68
WD	Zsuzsanna Nagy / Máté Fejes	Hungary		15	41.73		
