= Andrea Davidovich =

Israeli figure skater

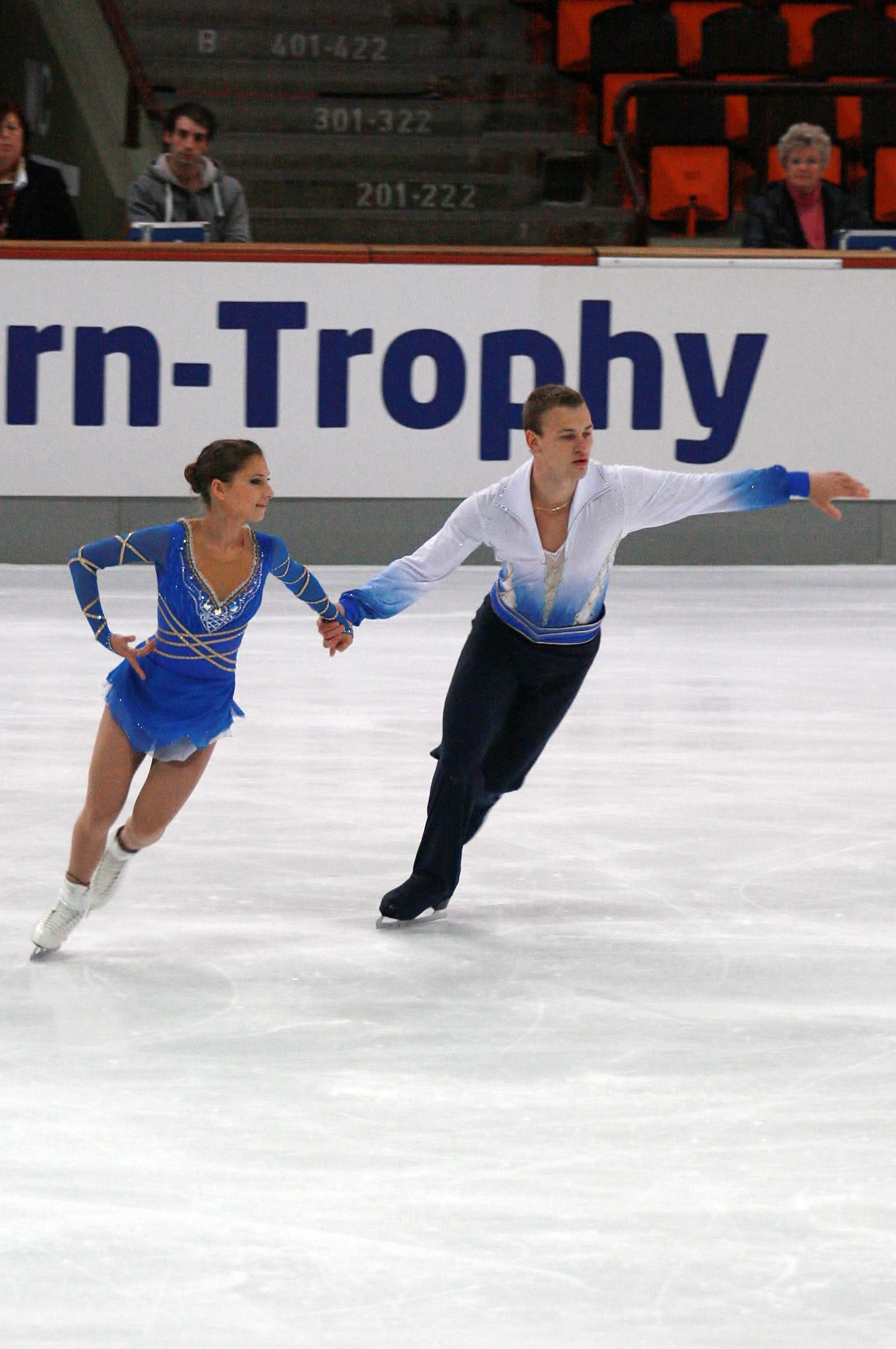
- Davidovich with Krasnopolski at the 2013 Nebelhorn Trophy

Personal information
- Native name: 'אנדראה דוידוביץ
- Other names: Anya Davidovich
- Born: March 24, 1997 (age 29) Burlington, Vermont, USA
- Height: 1.58 m (5 ft 2 in)

Figure skating career
- Coach: Gennadi Krasnitski

Andrea "Anya" Davidovich (Hebrew: 'אנדראה דוידוביץ; born March 24, 1997) is a former competitive pair skater. She and Evgeni Krasnopolski were the first pair representing Israel to qualify for an Olympics. They finished 15th in Sochi. Anya is currently a student at New York University studying computer science.

== Early life ==
Davidovich was born on March 24, 1997, in Burlington, Vermont. She was raised in New Jersey and is a dual citizen of the United States and Israel.

== Career ==
=== Early career ===
Prior to 2010, Davidovich was a member of Essex Skating Club in West Orange, New Jersey, USA. In 2008, she teamed up with Ivan Gyliaev, who had been training in Russia, and they skated together in the Nutcracker Theatre On Ice. They practiced together at the Essex Skating Club and placed first in Juvenile Duet at the 2009 U.S. Figure Skating National Showcase. In 2010, she became an independent member of U.S. Figure Skating.

=== Partnership with Krasnopolski ===
Davidovich teamed up with Israeli pair skater Evgeni Krasnopolski in the spring of 2013. They were coached by Gennadi Krasnitski at the Ice House in Hackensack, New Jersey.

After training together for six months, Davidovich/Krasnopolski made their international debut at the 2013 U.S. International Classic, where they finished sixth competing for Israel. Their next event was the 2013 Nebelhorn Trophy, the final opportunity to qualify for the 2014 Olympics. By placing tenth, Davidovich/Krasnopolski earned Israel its first ever pairs' entry at an Olympics. They won the 2013 Golden Spin of Zagreb in December and then placed seventh at the 2014 European Championships in January.

Davidovich/Krasnopolski finished 15th overall at the 2014 Winter Olympics in Sochi. Their partnership ended following the Olympics and Davidovich began seeking a new partner.

=== Contract dispute ===
Davidovich's membership of the Israel Ice Skating Federation ended in February 2014. The IISF refused requests from Davidovich, made on April 30, 2014, and from U.S. Figure Skating, to release her to compete internationally for the United States. On August 28, 2015, Bergen County, New Jersey Superior Court Judge Robert C. Wilson ordered the IISF to release Davidovich.

=== Later career ===
Davidovich placed ninth with AJ Reiss at the 2015 U.S. Championships.

== Programs ==
(with Krasnopolski)

Season	Short program	Free skating
2013–14	Fantasy for Violin and Orchestra by Joshua Bell	Love Theme (from Romeo and Juliet) by Nino Rota; Romeo and Juliet, Act I, Scene I by Sergei Prokofiev; Stradivarius by Edvin Marton

== Competitive highlights ==
=== With Reiss ===
National
Event	2014–15
U.S. Championships	9th

=== With Krasnopolski ===
International
Event	2013–14
Winter Olympics	15th
European Championships	7th
Nebelhorn Trophy	10th
Golden Spin of Zagreb	1st
U.S. Classic	6th
