= Alexandr Zaboev =

Russian pair skater (born 1989)

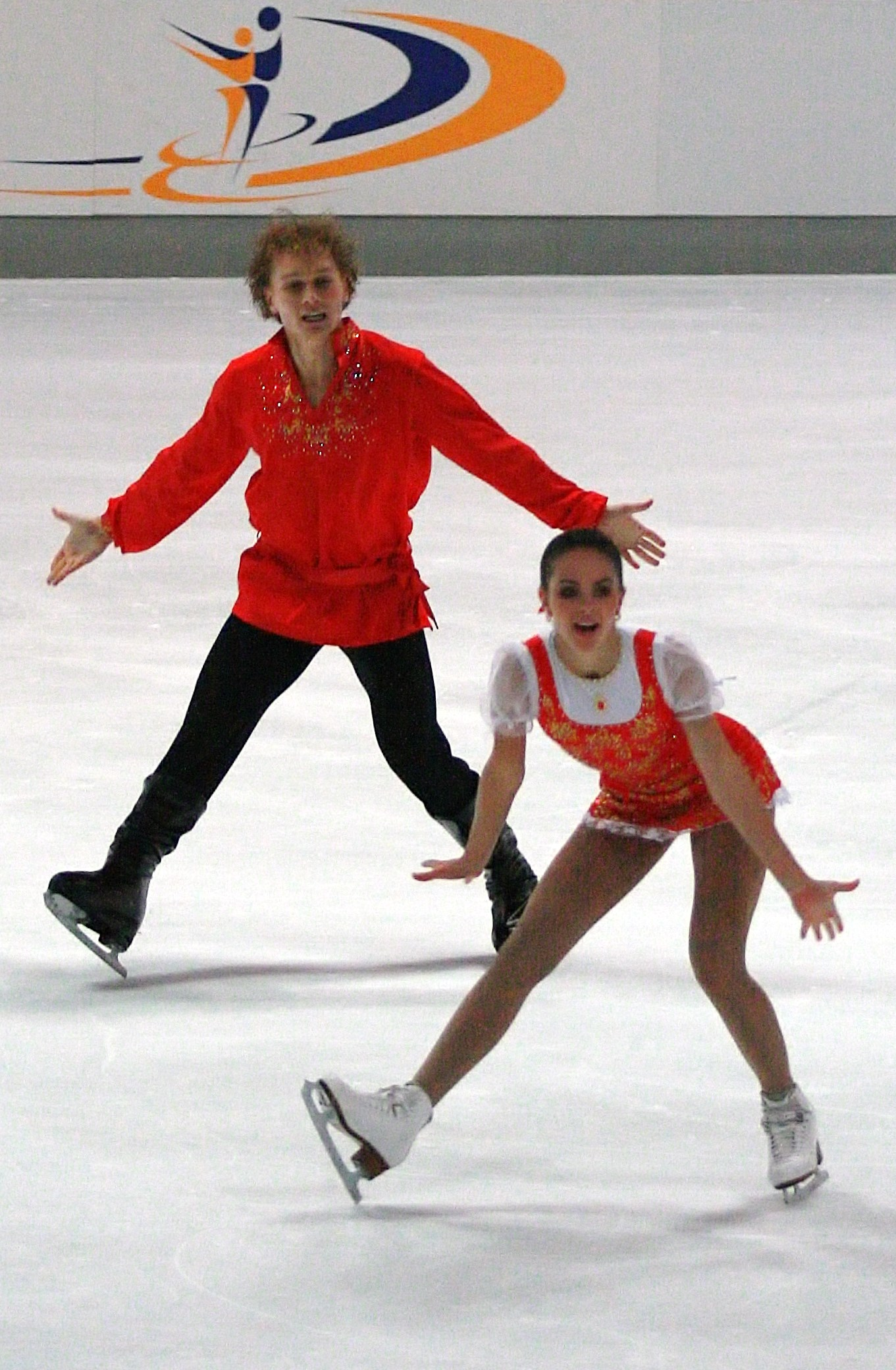
- Zabijako and Zaboev in 2013.

Personal information
- Born: 1 September 1989 (age 36) Sverdlovsk, Russian SFSR, Soviet Union
- Height: 1.77 m (5 ft 9 1/2 in)

Figure skating career
- Country: Japan
- Skating club: FSC Medal Tallinn
- Began skating: 1994

Medal record
Czech Championships
Silver medal – second place	2011 Žilina	Pairs

Alexandr Zaboev (Russian: Александр Забоев, born 1 September 1989) is a Russian pair skater. From 2012 to 2014, he skated with Natalja Zabijako for Estonia, placing tenth at the 2014 European Championships. Although they qualified a spot for Estonia in the pairs' event at the 2014 Winter Olympics, they did not compete in Sochi because Zaboev's fast-track citizenship application was declined.

== Personal life ==
Zaboev was born in Sverdlovsk, Russian SFSR, Soviet Union. In addition to skating, he competed in ballroom dancing until 2004.

== Skating career ==
Zaboev began skating in 1994 and competed in singles until the end of 2008, before joining an ice ballet for two years.

In 2010, Zaboev began competing in pair skating with Alexandra Herbríková for the Czech Republic. They were coached by Stanislav Žídek and Otto Dlabola in Ostrava.

Zaboev teamed up with Natalja Zabijako to compete for Estonia. They began training together on 19 September 2012. By finishing ninth at the 2013 Nebelhorn Trophy, they earned a spot for Estonia in pair skating at the 2014 Winter Olympics in Sochi. Zaboev applied for Estonian citizenship, required to represent the country at the Olympics, but in November 2013, Estonia denied his fast-track application.

Zabijako/Zaboev placed tenth at the 2014 European Championships and 19th at the 2014 World Championships. On 6 April 2014 Sport Express reported that their partnership had ended.

On 6 July 2015 it was announced that Zaboev had teamed up with Japanese pair skater Narumi Takahashi to compete for Japan. Their partnership was short-lived.

== Programs ==
=== With Zabijako ===
Season	Short program	Free skating
2013–14	Russian folk music	Conquest of Paradise by Vangelis

=== With Herbríková ===
Season	Short program	Free skating
2010–11	Glasgow Love Theme by Craig Armstrong	Doctor Zhivago by Maurice Jarre

== Competitive highlights ==
JGP: Junior Grand Prix

=== With Zabijako for Estonia ===
International
Event	2013–14
World Championships	19th
European Championships	10th
Golden Spin of Zagreb	2nd
Nebelhorn Trophy	9th

=== With Herbríková for the Czech Republic ===
International
Event	2010–11
Warsaw Cup	3rd
International: Junior
JGP Austria	14th
National
Czech Championships	2nd
