= Evgeni Krasnopolski =

Israeli pair skater (born 1988)

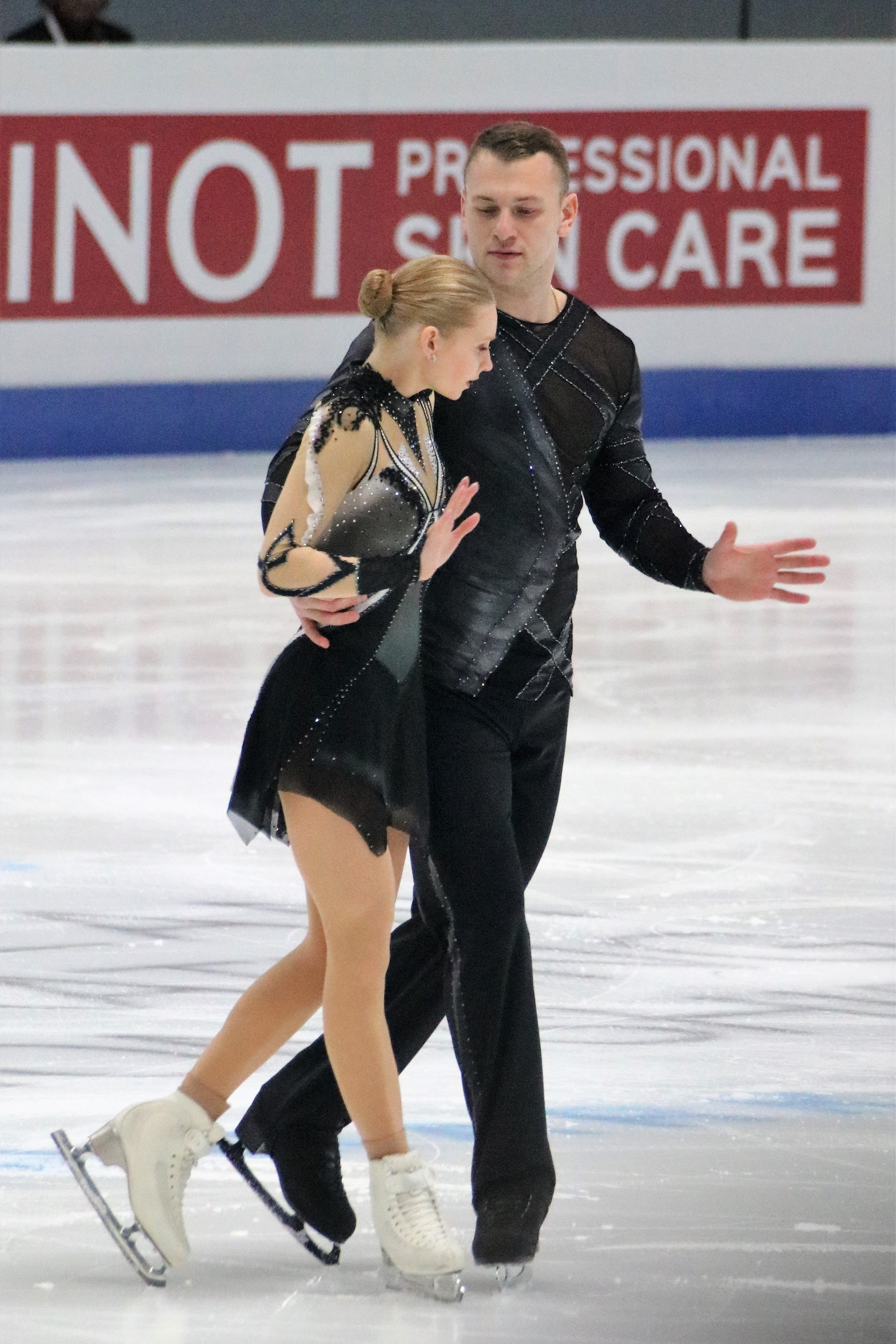
- Anna Vernikov and Evgeni Krasnopolski at the 2020 European Championships

Personal information
- Native name: יבגני קרסנופולסקי
- Other names: Krasnapolski; Krasnopolski; Krasnopolsky
- Born: 4 October 1988 (age 38) Kyiv, Ukraine, Soviet Union
- Height: 1.81 m (5 ft 11 in)

Figure skating career
- Country: Israel
- Discipline: Pair skating (2009–22); Men's singles (2002–09)
- Partner: Hailey Kops (2021–22); Anna Vernikov (2018–21); Paige Conners (2017–18); Arina Cherniavskaia (2016–17); Adel Tankova (2014–16); Andrea Davidovich (2013–14); Danielle Montalbano (2009–13)
- Began skating: 1996
- Retired: 2022

Medal record
Israeli Championships
Gold medal – first place	2015 Holon	Pairs
Gold medal – first place	2018 Holon	Pairs
Gold medal – first place	2020 Holon	Pairs
Gold medal – first place	2022 Holon	Pairs
Silver medal – second place	2004 Holon	Singles
Silver medal – second place	2005 Holon	Singles
Silver medal – second place	2009 Holon	Singles

Evgeni Krasnopolski (Hebrew: יבגני קרסנופולסקי, Ukrainian: Євгеній Краснопольський; born 4 October 1988) is a Ukrainian-born Israeli retired pair skater. Krasnopolski and Andrea Davidovich were the first pair representing Israel to qualify for Israel at the 2014 Olympics. They finished 15th in Sochi. Krasnopolski competed with Danielle Montalbano from 2009 to 2012. He competed for Israel at the 2018 Winter Olympics with Paige Conners in figure skating in pairs skating and a team event in Pyeongchang, South Korea. He and Hailey Kops competed at the 2021 CS Nebelhorn Trophy and qualified to compete for Israel at the 2022 Winter Olympics.

== Personal life ==
Krasnopolski was born in Kyiv, Ukrainian SSR, Soviet Union, and is Jewish. He arrived in Israel with his family when he was three years old.

== Career ==
=== Early years ===
Krasnopolski began skating as an eight-year-old at the Canada Centre in Metula. As a single skater, he won three silver medals on the senior national level at the Israeli Championships (2004–2005, 2009). He competed mainly on the junior level internationally. At age 20, he moved to New Jersey in the United States for training.

=== With Montalbano ===
In 2009, Krasnopolski teamed up with Danielle Montalbano to compete in pair skating. The two began competing together in the 2009–10 season. They withdrew from the 2011 European Figure Skating Championships after Montalbano dislocated her shoulder during practice.

In May 2011, Krasnopolski was charged with deserting from the Israeli army. The Israeli skating federation stated, "We've asked for clarifications [about his service], and if we would have gotten them immediately, Evgeni would have returned. The decision to let him stay abroad for training was a professional call made by the federation. The soldier got the (right) impression that we are handling the matter with the IDF and that he could trust the federation".

Montalbano/Krasnopolski medalled at several senior B events in the 2011–12 season and finished 11th at the 2012 European Figure Skating Championships and 17th at the World Championships. They competed at several events in the fall of 2012, including a Grand Prix event, the 2012 Skate America, but missed the rest of the season due to injury; Montalbano broke her ankle in November 2012 while practicing a twist lift. Montalbano/Krasnopolski were coached by Kyoko Ina. Their partnership ended in 2013.

=== With Davidovich ===
In the spring of 2013, Krasnopolski teamed up with Andrea Davidovich, a former singles skater. They were coached by Gennadi Krasnitski and Galit Chait at the Ice House in Hackensack, New Jersey.

Davidovich/Krasnopolski made their international debut at the 2013 U.S. International Classic, where they finished sixth. Their next event was the 2013 Nebelhorn Trophy, the final opportunity to qualify for the 2014 Olympics. By placing tenth, Davidovich/Krasnopolski earned Israel its first ever pairs' entry at an Olympics. In December, they won the 2013 Golden Spin of Zagreb. They placed seventh at the 2014 European Championships.

At the 2014 Winter Olympics in Sochi, Davidovich/Krasnopolski finished 15th overall. Their partnership ended following the Olympics. Krasnopolski said they were unable to agree on a coach.

=== With Tankova ===
Krasnopolski formed a partnership with Adel Tankova. They were coached by Galit Chait Moracci and Anton Nimenko in Hackensack, New Jersey.

Tankova/Krasnopolski made their international debut in September 2015, placing sixth at the 2015 U.S. Classic, a part of the 2015–16 ISU Challenger Series (CS). They finished 7th at the 2015 CS Mordovian Ornament, fourth at the 2016 Toruń Cup, and 13th at the 2016 European Championships.

=== With Cherniavskaia ===
In 2016, Krasnopolski teamed up with Arina Cherniavskaia.

=== With Conners ===
In 2017, Krasnopolski teamed up with Paige Conners.

He competed for Israel at the 2018 Winter Olympics with Conners in Figure Skating in pairs skating (coming in 19th) and a team event in Pyeongchang, South Korea.

=== With Vernikov ===
In 2019, Krasnopolski teamed up with Anna Vernikov, who is 14 years younger.

=== With Kops ===
In July 2021, Krasnopolski announced that he had teamed up with Hailey Kops. After three months' preparation, they competed at the 2021 CS Nebelhorn Trophy to attempt to qualify a berth for Israel at the 2022 Winter Olympics. Seventh in the short program, they were fourth in the free skate and rose to fifth overall, sufficient to qualify for the third of three available pairs spots. They qualified for the free skate in the pairs event, finishing fifteenth overall.

== Programs ==
=== With Kops ===
Season	Short program	Free skating
2021–2022	Torn by Nathan Lanier; Heart Cry by Drehz choreo. by Galit Chait Moracci	The Impossible Dream (from Man of La Mancha) by Mitch Leigh & Joe Darion performed by Josh Groban choreo. by Galit Chait Moracci

=== With Vernikov ===
Season	Short program	Free skating
2020–2021	Love Story performed by Il Divo choreo. by Galit Chait Moracci	To Build a Home by The Cinematic Orchestra choreo. by Galit Chait Moracci
2019–2020	Love Story performed by Il Divo choreo. by Galit Chait Moracci; Moonlight by Viper choreo. by Galit Chait Moracci	The Experience choreo. by Galit Chait Moracci

=== With Conners ===
Season	Short program	Free skating
2017–2018	Ghost the Musical by David A. Stewart, Glen Ballard	Schindler's List by John Williams

=== With Cherniavskaia ===
Season	Short program	Free skating
2016–2017	Nocturne No. 20 in C Minor by Frédéric Chopin performed by Joshua Bell	The Feeling Begins (from Passion) by Peter Gabriel

=== With Tankova ===
Season	Short program	Free skating
2015–2016	The Prayer by David Foster, Carole Bayer Sager performed by Celine Dion, Andrea Bocelli	Exogenesis: Symphony by Muse; Part I: Overture; Part II: Cross-Pollination

=== With Davidovich ===
Season	Short program	Free skating
2013–2014	Fantasy for Violin and Orchestra by Joshua Bell	Love Theme (from Romeo and Juliet) by Nino Rota; Romeo and Juliet, Act I, Scene I by Sergei Prokofiev; Stradivarius by Edvin Marton

=== With Montalbano ===
Season	Short program	Free skating
2012–2013	Requiem for a Dream by Clint Mansell	Phantom of the Opera by Andrew Lloyd Webber
2011–2012	Assassin's Tango (from Mr. & Mrs. Smith) by John Powell	Nyah (from Mission: Impossible) by Hans Zimmer; When A Man Loves A Woman
2010–2011	James Bond theme	Nyah (from Mission: Impossible) by Hans Zimmer; When A Man Loves A Woman
2009–2010	Night Flight (from Crouching Tiger, Hidden Dragon) by Tan Dun	Nyah (from Mission: Impossible) by Hans Zimmer

=== Single skating ===
Season	Short program	Free skating
2007–2008	Spanish medley by Narciso Yepes	Music by Bond
2006–2007	Concierto de Aranjuez by Joaquín Rodrigo	The Best of French Cinema by Vladimir Cosma
2005–2006	Malas Mana by Gammy	Metello – Idea Dance by Ennio Morricone
2004–2005	Clean Ceven by Artik	Music by Francis Lai
2003–2004	Jalouse Andalouse Torrero by Orchestra Nicolas de Angelis Nova Menco	Canone inverso by Ennio Morricone

== Competitive highlights ==
- GP – Event of the ISU Grand Prix Series
- JGP – Event of the ISU Junior Grand Prix Series
- CS – Event of the ISU Challenger Series
- WD – Withdrew from competition
- C – Event was cancelled

=== Pair skating with Hailey Kops ===
Competition placements at senior level
Season	2021–22
Winter Olympics	15th
World Championships	12th
Israeli Championships	1st
CS Golden Spin of Zagreb	12th
CS Nebelhorn Trophy	5th
CS Warsaw Cup	13th
Cranberry Cup	11th
John Nicks Pairs	7th

=== Pair skating with Anna Vernikov ===
Competition placements at senior level
Season	2018–19	2019–20	2020–21
World Championships		C	19th
European Championships		13th	
Israeli Championships		1st	
GP Skate America			8th
CS Golden Spin of Zagreb		11th	
CS Nebelhorn Trophy		10th	
Challenge Cup		5th	
Open Ice Mall Cup	3rd		
Volvo Open Cup		3rd	

=== Pair skating with Paige Conners ===
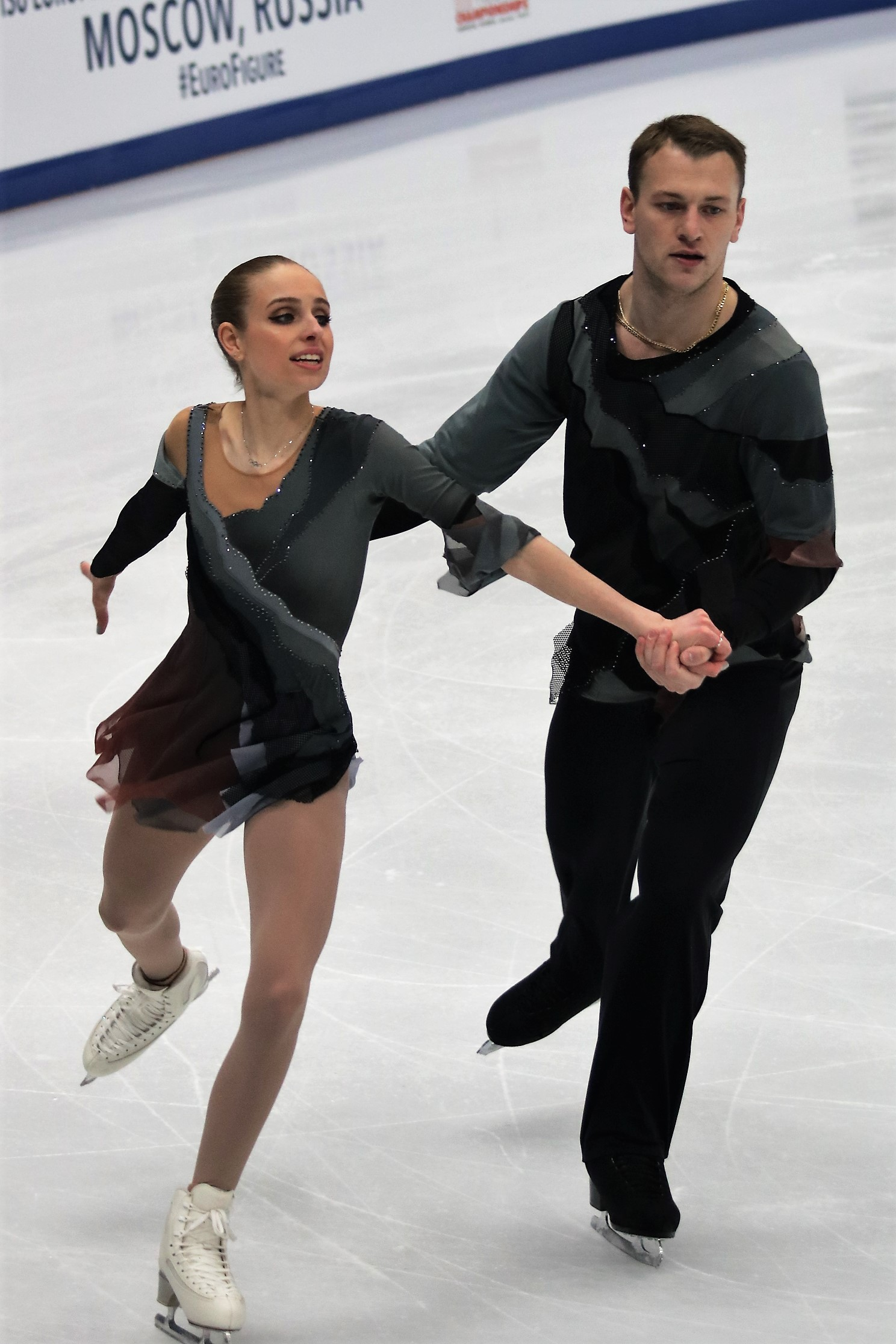
Paige Conners and Evgeni Krasnopolski at the 2018 European Championships

Competition placements at senior level
Season	2017–18
Winter Olympics	19th
Winter Olympics (Team event)	8th
World Championships	19th
European Championships	9th
Israeli Championships	1st
CS Ice Star	3rd
CS Nebelhorn Trophy	8th
CS U.S. Classic	5th

=== Pair skating with Arina Cherniavskaia ===
Competition placements at senior level
Season	2016–17
European Championships	16th
CS Golden Spin of Zagreb	WD
CS Tallinn Trophy	5th
Volvo Open Cup	1st

=== Pair skating with Adel Tankova ===
Competition placements at senior level
Season	2014–15	2015–16
World Championships		19th
European Championships		13th
Israeli Championships	1st	1st
CS Mordovian Ornament		7th
CS U.S. Classic		6th
Mentor Toruń Cup		4th

=== Pair skating with Andrea Davidovich ===
Competition placements at senior level
Season	2013–14
Winter Olympics	15th
European Championships	7th
Golden Spin of Zagreb	1st
Nebelhorn Trophy	10th
U.S. Classic	6th

=== Pair skating with Danielle Montalbano ===
International
Event	09–10	10–11	11–12	12–13
World Champ.	25th	20th	17th	
European Champ.	18th		11th	
GP Skate America				7th
Cup of Nice			11th	
Golden Spin	4th	6th	3rd	
Ice Challenge		7th	3rd	3rd
Nebelhorn Trophy		9th	9th	6th
Toruń Cup			2nd	
U.S. Classic				6th

=== Single skating ===
International
Event	02–03	03–04	04–05	05–06	06–07	07–08	08–09
Schäfer Memorial							18th
Skate Israel				7th			
International: Junior
Junior Worlds			31st	33rd	38th	30th	
JGP Bulgaria						15th	
JGP Croatia						18th	
JGP Czech Rep.		25th			20th		
JGP Hungary			21st				
JGP Romania					19th		
JGP Slovakia	22nd			15th			
EYOF	19th J						
Golden Bear		8th J					
National
Israeli Champ.	2nd J	2nd	2nd				2nd

== See also ==
- Sports in Israel
