= Kerstin Frank =

Austrian figure skater

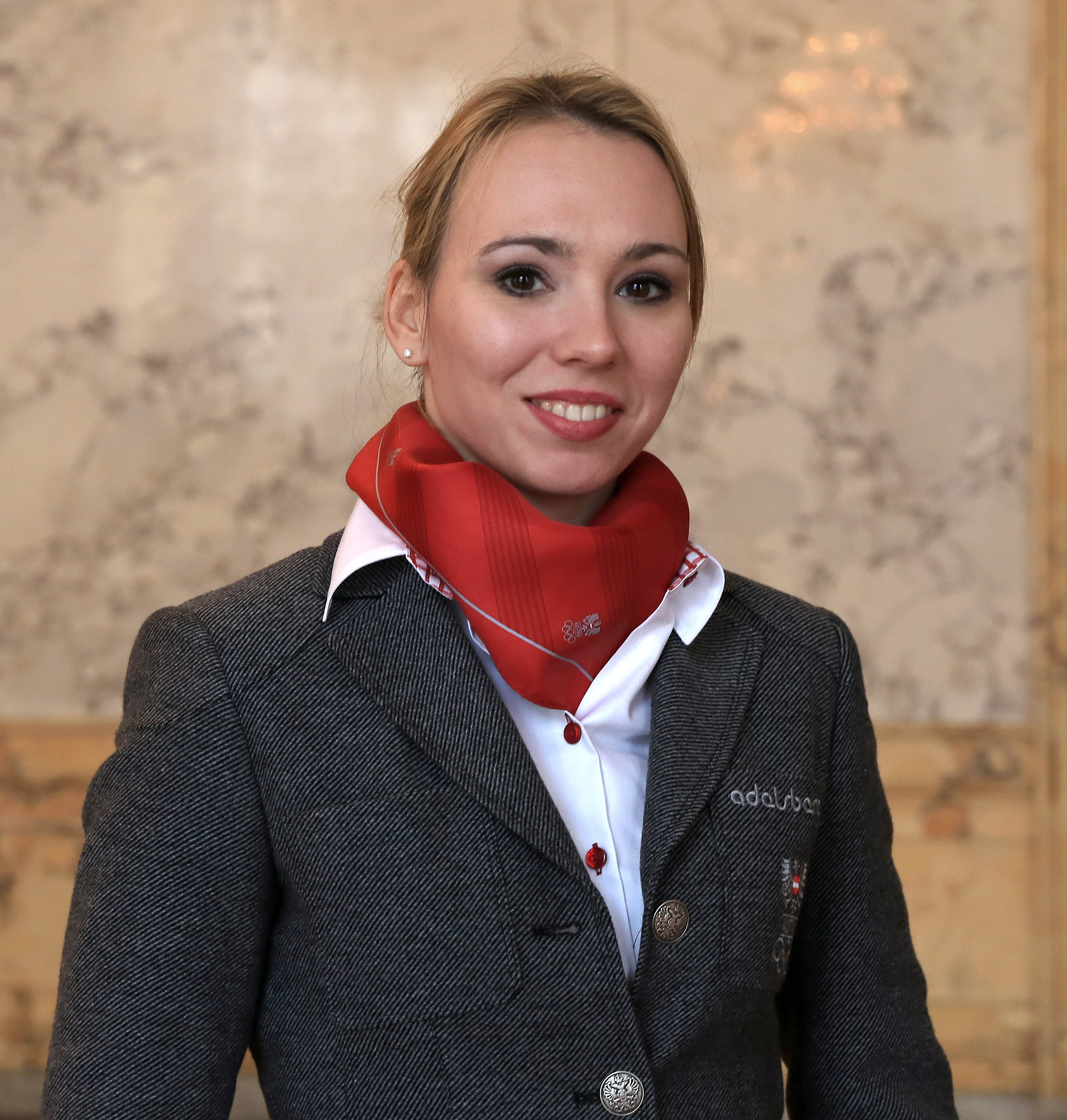
- Frank in 2014

Personal information
- Born: 23 October 1988 (age 37) Vienna, Austria
- Height: 1.63 m (5 ft 4 in)

Figure skating career
- Country: Austria
- Coach: Sonja Harand, Yuka Sato, Jason Dungjen
- Skating club: Wiener EV
- Began skating: 1998
- Retired: August 8, 2018

Kerstin Frank (born 23 October 1988) is an Austrian former competitive figure skater. She is a six-time national champion and represented Austria at the 2014 Winter Olympics. She has won eleven international medals and reached the free skate at nine ISU Championships.

== Personal life ==
Kerstin Frank was born on 23 October 1988 in Vienna, Austria. She studied biology at the University of Vienna and serves in a work and sports program in the Austrian army.

== Career ==
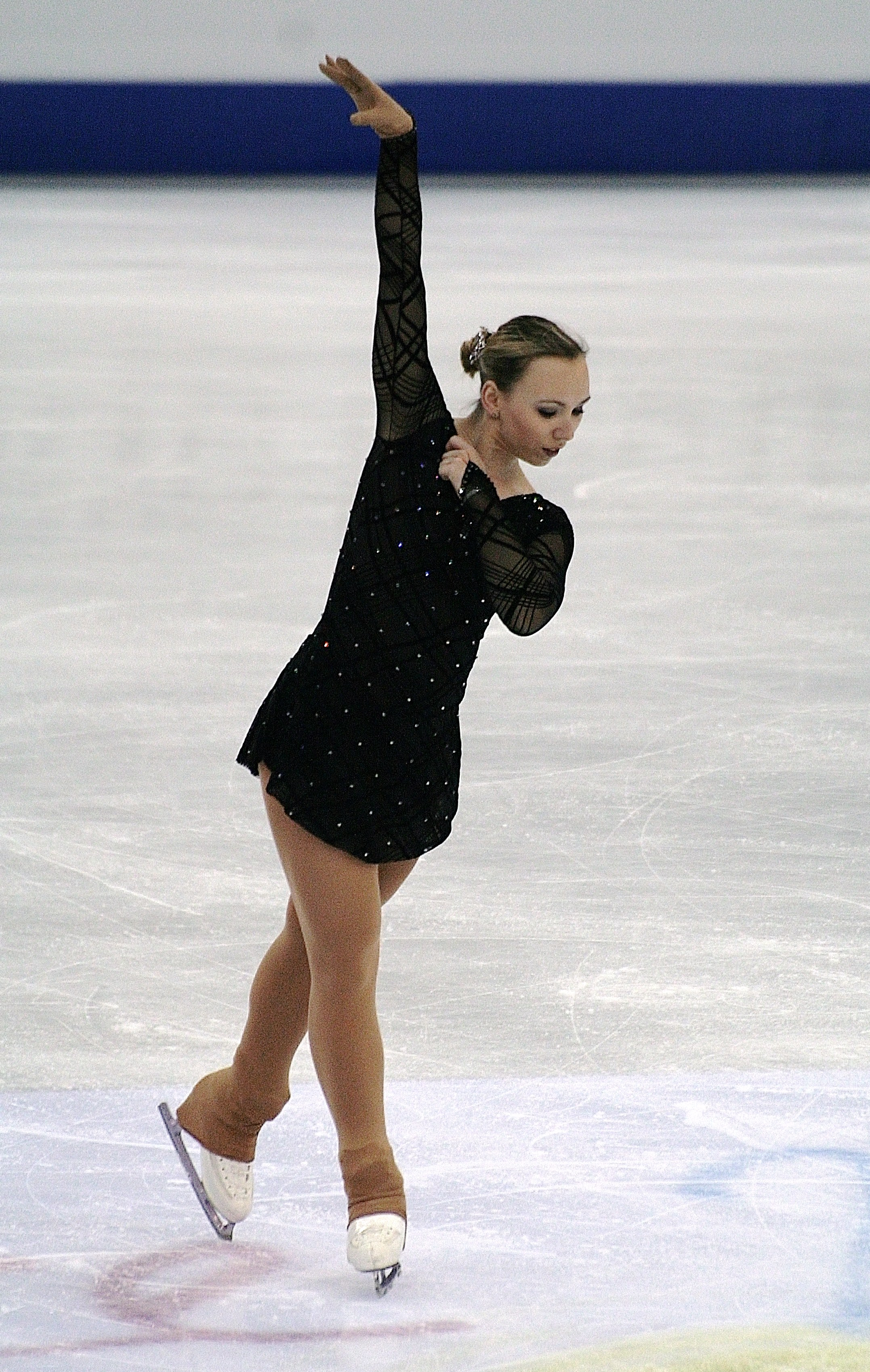
Frank in 2012

Frank began competing on the junior international level in 2004 and made her senior international debut in spring 2006; she would appear on both levels that year and 2007. Her best result at an ISU Junior Grand Prix event was seventh at the 2006 JGP in Courchevel, France. She was selected to represent Austria at the 2007 World Junior Championships in Oberstdorf and finished 23rd.

In the 2008–09 season, Frank won the silver medal at the Austrian Championships and was assigned to her first senior ISU Championships. Reaching the free skate at both events, she placed 20th at the 2009 European Championships in Helsinki and 23rd at the 2009 World Championships in Los Angeles.

Frank achieved her best European result at the 2013 European Championships in Zagreb, where she finished 12th. At the 2013 Nebelhorn Trophy, she qualified a ladies' entry for her country at the 2014 Winter Olympics. She placed 26th in Sochi.

== Programs ==
Season	Short program	Free skating
2017–2018	Swing, Swing, Swing by Keely Smith; Sing, Sing, Sing performed by Benny Goodman	The Great Gatsby
2016–2017	Swing, Swing, Swing by Keely Smith; Sing, Sing, Sing performed by Benny Goodman	Dance of the Vampires; Total Eclipse of the Heart; Dance of the Vampires by Jim Steinman
2015–2016	Kingdom Hearts by Yoko Shimomura	Dance of the Vampires; Total Eclipse of the Heart; Dance of the Vampires by Jim Steinman
2014–2015	Kingdom Hearts by Yoko Shimomura	Die Fledermaus; Tausend und eine Nacht by Johann Strauss II
2013–2014	Bohemian Rhapsody performed by Maksim Mrvica	Die Fledermaus by Johann Strauss II
2012–2013	Bohemian Rhapsody performed by Maksim Mrvica	Soundtracks by David Arnold
2011–2012	Kingdom Hearts by Yoko Shimomura	Soundtracks by Hans Zimmer and William Ross
2009–2010	Yellow River Concerto	The Stepford Wives by David Arnold; Grand National by Carl Davis
2008–2009	Yellow River Concerto	Outback (soundtrack)
2006–2007	The Red Boots	Outback (soundtrack)

== Competitive highlights ==
GP: Grand Prix; CS: Challenger Series; JGP: Junior Grand Prix

International
Event	04–05	05–06	06–07	07–08	08–09	09–10	10–11	11–12	12–13	13–14	14–15	15–16	16–17	17–18
Olympics										26th				
Worlds					23rd	30th		21st	24th	31st	WD	32nd	31st	
Europeans					20th			30th	12th	31st	17th	22nd	22nd	
CS Denkova-Stav.												5th		
CS Golden Spin											13th			
CS Lombardia											14th			
CS Nebelhorn														13th
CS Ondrej Nepela											8th	16th		
CS Tallinn Trophy													9th	WD
Asian Open										6th				
Coupe Printemps													9th	
Crystal Skate					10th	2nd	3rd							
Cup of Nice					13th									
FBMA Trophy													2nd	
Gardena Trophy							5th					3rd		
Golden Bear									1st				10th	9th
Golden Spin							13th							
Ice Challenge														5th
Ice Star									2nd					
Challenge Cup					7th			5th	3rd					
Karl Schäfer			9th											
Lombardia Trophy												6th		
Merano Cup						6th	3rd		5th		4th			
Nebelhorn Trophy								13th	13th	9th				
Ondrej Nepela			6th			2nd	WD	9th	10th					
New Year's Cup									2nd	2nd				
NRW Trophy				4th					12th		3rd			
Santa Claus Cup														19th
Sarajevo Open														2nd
Slovenia Open										1st				
Triglav Trophy				6th			6th							
Universiade											10th			
International: Junior
Junior Worlds			23rd											
JGP Estonia				20th										
JGP France			7th											
JGP U.K.				20th										
Gardena Trophy		10th												
Grand Prize SNP	4th	3rd	1st											
Heiko Fischer				3rd										
National
Austria	5th	WD	3rd	3rd	2nd	2nd	3rd	1st	1st	1st	1st	1st	1st	WD
Austria: Junior			1st											
J = Junior level; WD = Withdrew
