= 2013 Nebelhorn Trophy =

- Type: Senior international
- Date: September 26 – 28
- Season: 2013–14
- Location: Oberstdorf
- Venue: Eislaufzentrum Oberstdorf

Champions
- Men's singles: (Japan) Nobunari Oda
- Ladies' singles: (Russia) Elena Radionova
- Pairs: (Russia) Tatiana Volosozhar / Maxim Trankov
- Ice dance: (United States) Madison Hubbell / Zachary Donohue
- Previous: 2012 Nebelhorn Trophy
- Next: 2014 CS Nebelhorn Trophy

The 2013 Nebelhorn Trophy was held on September 26–28, 2013 at the Eislaufzentrum Oberstdorf. It is held annually in Oberstdorf, Germany and is named after the Nebelhorn, a nearby mountain. Medals were awarded in men's and ladies' singles, pair skating, and ice dance. Nebelhorn was the last qualifying event for the 2014 Winter Olympics.

== Overview ==
Though most Olympic spots were earned at the 2013 World Championships, six spots in each of men's and ladies' singles, four in pair skating, and five in ice dance were available at Nebelhorn for countries which remained without a berth in a discipline. Skaters from previously qualified countries also competed but only for medals; Nebelhorn could not be used to earn additional spots if a country already had one in a discipline.

Russia's Tatiana Volosozhar / Maxim Trankov won the pairs' event after placing first in both programs, while Germany's Maylin Wende / Daniel Wende and Mari Vartmann / Aaron Van Cleave took silver and bronze respectively. Great Britain's Stacey Kemp / David King, Ukraine's Elizaveta Usmantseva / Roman Talan, Estonia's Natalja Zabijako / Alexandr Zaboev, and Israel's Andrea Davidovich / Evgeni Krasnopolski earned Olympic berths for their countries.

The ladies' event was won by Russia's Elena Radionova, with silver going to Japan's Miki Ando and bronze to the United States' Ashley Cain. The Olympic berths were earned by Brooklee Han for Australia, Elene Gedevanishvili for Georgia, Anne Line Gjersem for Norway, Kerstin Frank for Austria, Elizaveta Ukolova for the Czech Republic, and Isadora Williams for Brazil.

Japan's Nobunari Oda won the men's event for the third time, finishing over 30 points ahead of silver medalist Jason Brown of the United States and bronze medalist Jeremy Ten of Canada. Securing an Olympic spot for their country were Alexei Bychenko for Israel, Zoltán Kelemen for Romania, Michael Christian Martinez for the Philippines, Brendan Kerry for Australia, Yakov Godorozha for Ukraine, and Paul Bonifacio Parkinson for Italy.

Madison Hubbell / Zachary Donohue of the United States were the winners of the ice dance event ahead of Russia's Ksenia Monko / Kirill Khaliavin and Canada's Alexandra Paul / Mitchell Islam. China's Huang Xintong / Zheng Xun, Turkey's Alisa Agafonova / Alper Uçar, Australia's Danielle O'Brien / Gregory Merriman, Japan's Cathy Reed / Chris Reed, and Spain's Sara Hurtado / Adrià Díaz earned Olympic spots for their countries.

== Entries ==
Country	Men	Ladies	Pairs	Ice dance
Armenia	Slavik Hayrapetyan			
Australia	Brendan Kerry	Brooklee Han		Danielle O'Brien / Gregory Merriman
Austria		Kerstin Frank	Miriam Ziegler / Severin Kiefer	Kira Geil / Tobias Eisenbauer
Belarus	Pavel Ignatenko		Maria Paliakova / Nikita Bochkov	Lesia Volodenkova / Vitali Vakunov
Belgium		Kaat Van Daele		
Brazil	Luiz Manella	Isadora Williams		
Bulgaria	Manol Atanassov	Anna Afonkina	Elizaveta Makarova / Leri Kenchadze	
Canada	Jeremy Ten	Veronik Mallet	Natasha Purich / Mervin Tran	Alexandra Paul / Mitchell Islam
China				Huang Xintong / Zheng Xun
Chinese Taipei	Jordan Ju	Crystal Kiang		
Croatia	Josip Gluhak			
Czech Republic		Elizaveta Ukolova		Gabriela Kubová / Matěj Novák
Denmark	Justus Strid			
Estonia		Jelena Glebova	Natalja Zabijako / Alexandr Zaboev	Irina Shtork / Taavi Rand
Finland	Bela Papp; Valtter Virtanen	Juulia Turkkila		Henna Lindholm / Ossi Kanervo
Georgia		Elene Gedevanishvili		Angelina Telegina / Otar Japaridze
Germany	Martin Rappe	Nathalie Weinzierl	Anabelle Prolss / Ruben Blommaert; Mari Vartmann / Aaron Van Cleave; Maylin Wende / Daniel Wende	Shari Koch / Christian Nuchtern
Greece		Isabella Schuster-Velissariou		
Hong Kong	Ronald Lam			
Hungary	Marton Marko	Chelsea Rose Chiappa		Dora Turoczi / Balazs Major
India		Ami Parekh		
Ireland	Conor Stakelum	Clara Peters		
Israel	Alexei Bychenko; Stanislav Samohin	Danielle Montalbano	Andrea Davidovich / Evgeni Krasnopolski	Allison Reed / Vasili Rogov
Italy	Paul Bonifacio Parkinson			
Japan	Nobunari Oda	Miki Ando	Narumi Takahashi / Ryuichi Kihara	Cathy Reed / Chris Reed
Latvia		Alina Fjodorova		
Lithuania	Saulius Ambrulevičius	Inga Janulevičiūtė		
Luxembourg		Fleur Maxwell		
Mexico	Fabriczio Carrillo	Reyna Hamui		Pilar Maekawa Moreno / Leonardo Maekawa Moreno
Monaco	Kim Lucine			
Netherlands		Michelle Couwenberg		
North Korea	Hyon Choe		So Hyang Pak / Nam I Song	
Norway		Anne Line Gjersem		
Philippines	Michael Christian Martinez	Alisson Krystle Perticheto		
Poland	Maciej Cieplucha		Magdalena Klatka / Radoslaw Chruscinski	Justyna Plutowska / Peter Gerber
Romania	Zoltán Kelemen	Sabina Mariuta		
Russia	Artur Dmitriev Jr.	Elena Radionova	Tatiana Volosozhar / Maxim Trankov	Ksenia Monko / Kirill Khaliavin
Serbia		Sandra Ristivojevic		
Slovakia				Federica Testa / Lukáš Csölley
Slovenia		Daša Grm		
South Africa		Lejeanne Marais		
South Korea	Kim Jin-seo			
Spain		Sonia Lafuente	Veronica Grigorieva / Aritz Maestu	Sara Hurtado / Adrià Díaz
Sweden	Ondrej Spiegl		Ronja Roll / Gustav Forsgren	
Switzerland	Stephane Walker	Tina Stuerzinger		Ramona Elsener / Florian Roost
Turkey	Ali Demirboğa	Birce Atabey	Olga Bestandigova / İlhan Mansız	Alisa Agafonova / Alper Uçar
Ukraine	Yakov Godorozha		Elizaveta Usmantseva / Roman Talan	Siobhan Heekin-Canedy / Dmitri Dun
United Kingdom	Matthew Parr		Stacey Kemp / David King	
United States	Jason Brown	Ashley Cain	Lindsay Davis / Rockne Brubaker	Madison Hubbell / Zachary Donohue

== Results ==
=== Men ===
Rank	Name	Nation	Total points	SP		FS	
1	Nobunari Oda	Japan	262.98	1	87.34	1	175.64
2	Jason Brown	United States	228.43	2	79.41	2	149.02
3	Jeremy Ten	Canada	205.56	3	76.49	5	129.07
4	Artur Dmitriev, Jr.	Russia	201.74	4	73.39	7	128.35
5	Alexei Bychenko	Israel	197.46 Q	8	64.50	3	132.96
6	Zoltán Kelemen	Romania	194.08 Q	6	65.52	6	128.56
7	Michael Christian Martinez	Philippines	189.46 Q	11	61.55	8	127.91
8	Brendan Kerry	Australia	188.67 Q	5	67.97	12	120.70
9	Yakov Godorozha	Ukraine	188.26 Q	9	63.68	9	124.58
10	Paul Bonifacio Parkinson	Italy	184.07 Q	10	63.37	13	120.70
11	Maciej Cieplucha	Poland	179.24	15	58.26	10	120.98
12	Luiz Manella	Brazil	178.62	24	48.67	4	129.95
13	Justus Strid	Denmark	176.19	17	55.28	11	120.91
14	Kim Lucine	Monaco	172.66	13	59.28	16	113.38
15	Stéphane Walker	Switzerland	169.26	12	60.50	19	108.76
16	Stanislav Samohin	Israel	168.01	14	58.64	18	109.37
17	Pavel Ignatenko	Belarus	166.60	22	51.71	15	114.89
18	Martin Rappe	Germany	166.17	18	54.49	17	111.68
19	Valtter Virtanen	Finland	162.56	16	55.55	20	107.01
20	Kim Jin-seo	South Korea	161.29	30	44.92	14	116.37
21	Ondrej Spiegl	Sweden	158.08	19	52.50	21	105.58
22	Manol Atanassov	Bulgaria	152.28	21	51.73	23	100.55
23	Bela Papp	Finland	151.76	20	52.34	24	99.42
24	Hyon Choe	North Korea	151.24	23	48.78	22	102.46
25	Matthew Parr	United Kingdom	144.64	27	47.21	25	97.43
26	Ronald Lam	Hong Kong	144.18	7	64.55	28	79.63
27	Jordan Ju	Chinese Taipei	144.09	26	47.57	26	96.52
28	Slavik Hayrapetyan	Armenia	133.77	25	47.90	27	85.87
29	Ali Demirboğa	Turkey	126.58	28	47.04	29	79.54
30	Saulius Ambrulevičius	Lithuania	121.62	29	46.68	33	74.94
31	Marton Marko	Hungary	118.65	31	42.49	31	76.16
32	Fabriczio Carrillo	Mexico	116.85	32	41.01	32	75.84
33	Josip Gluhak	Croatia	114.88	33	36.91	30	77.97
34	Conor Stakelum	Ireland	96.23	34	30.15	34	66.08

=== Ladies ===
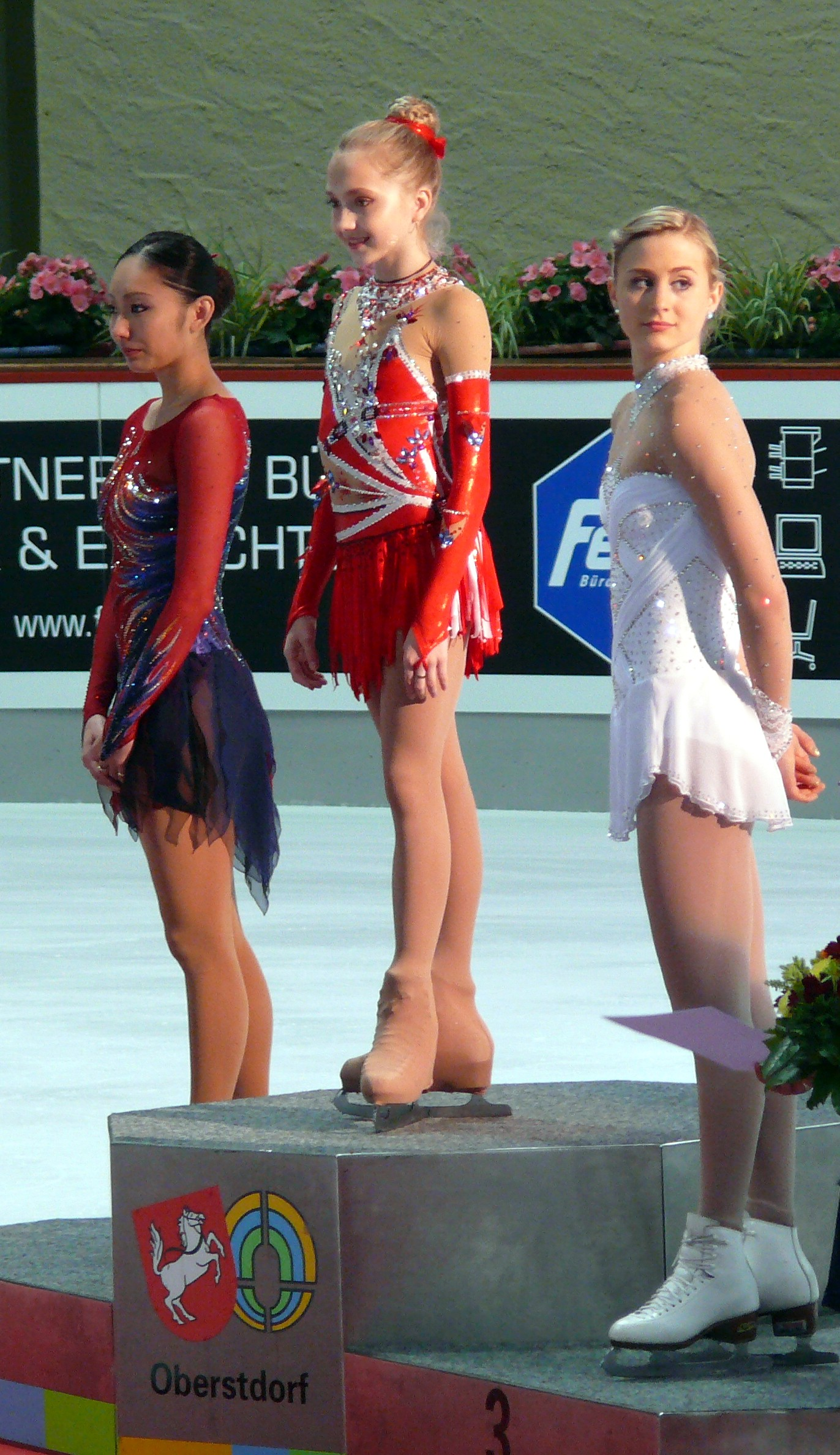
Ando, Radionova, and Cain stand on the ladies' podium

Rank	Name	Nation	Total points	SP		FS	
1	Elena Radionova	Russia	188.21	1	64.69	1	123.52
2	Miki Ando	Japan	162.86	2	59.79	4	103.07
3	Ashley Cain	United States	162.39	3	57.87	2	104.52
4	Veronik Mallet	Canada	159.67	4	55.79	3	103.88
5	Brooklee Han	Australia	147.16 Q	10	48.74	5	98.42
6	Elene Gedevanishvili	Georgia	144.80 Q	6	51.59	7	93.21
7	Anne Line Gjersem	Norway	142.87 Q	11	48.35	6	94.52
8	Nathalie Weinzierl	Germany	137.36	5	54.60	11	82.76
9	Kerstin Frank	Austria	137.03 Q	9	48.81	9	88.22
10	Elizaveta Ukolova	Czech Republic	136.72 Q	7	50.93	10	85.79
11	Jelena Glebova	Estonia	134.74	14	46.27	8	88.47
12	Isadora Williams	Brazil	130.08 Q	8	50.35	14	79.73
13	Inga Janulevičiūtė	Lithuania	128.19	15	45.74	12	82.45
14	Juulia Turkkila	Finland	121.82	19	40.63	13	81.19
15	Fleur Maxwell	Luxembourg	119.71	13	47.13	21	72.58
16	Reyna Hamui	Mexico	117.31	21	40.17	15	77.14
17	Alina Fjodorova	Latvia	116.50	17	41.40	17	75.10
18	Alisson Krystle Perticheto	Philippines	113.48	16	45.17	25	68.31
19	Dasa Grm	Slovenia	112.67	22	38.58	18	74.09
20	Crystal Kiang	Chinese Taipei	110.68	25	36.62	19	74.06
21	Anna Afonkina	Bulgaria	110.07	29	34.15	16	75.92
22	Kaat Van Daele	Belgium	110.01	12	47.87	29	62.14
23	Tina Stuerzinger	Switzerland	109.72	26	35.91	20	73.81
24	Michelle Couwenberg	Netherlands	108.69	24	36.81	23	71.88
25	Anita Madsen	Denmark	108.60	23	38.15	24	70.45
26	Sonia Lafuente	Spain	107.30	20	40.46	26	66.84
27	Danielle Montalbano	Israel	106.69	28	34.32	22	72.37
28	Sabina Mariuta	Romania	106.62	18	41.12	27	65.50
29	Isabella Schuster-Velissariou	Greece	97.42	27	34.99	28	62.43
30	Ami Parekh	India	94.54	32	33.77	30	60.77
31	Lejeanne Marais	South Africa	94.52	31	33.80	31	60.72
32	Birce Atabey	Turkey	90.73	30	34.14	33	56.59
33	Clara Peters	Ireland	87.25	35	28.30	32	58.95
34	Chelsea Rose Chiappa	Hungary	86.41	34	31.59	34	54.82
35	Sandra Ristivojevic	Serbia	80.32	33	32.44	35	47.88

=== Pairs ===
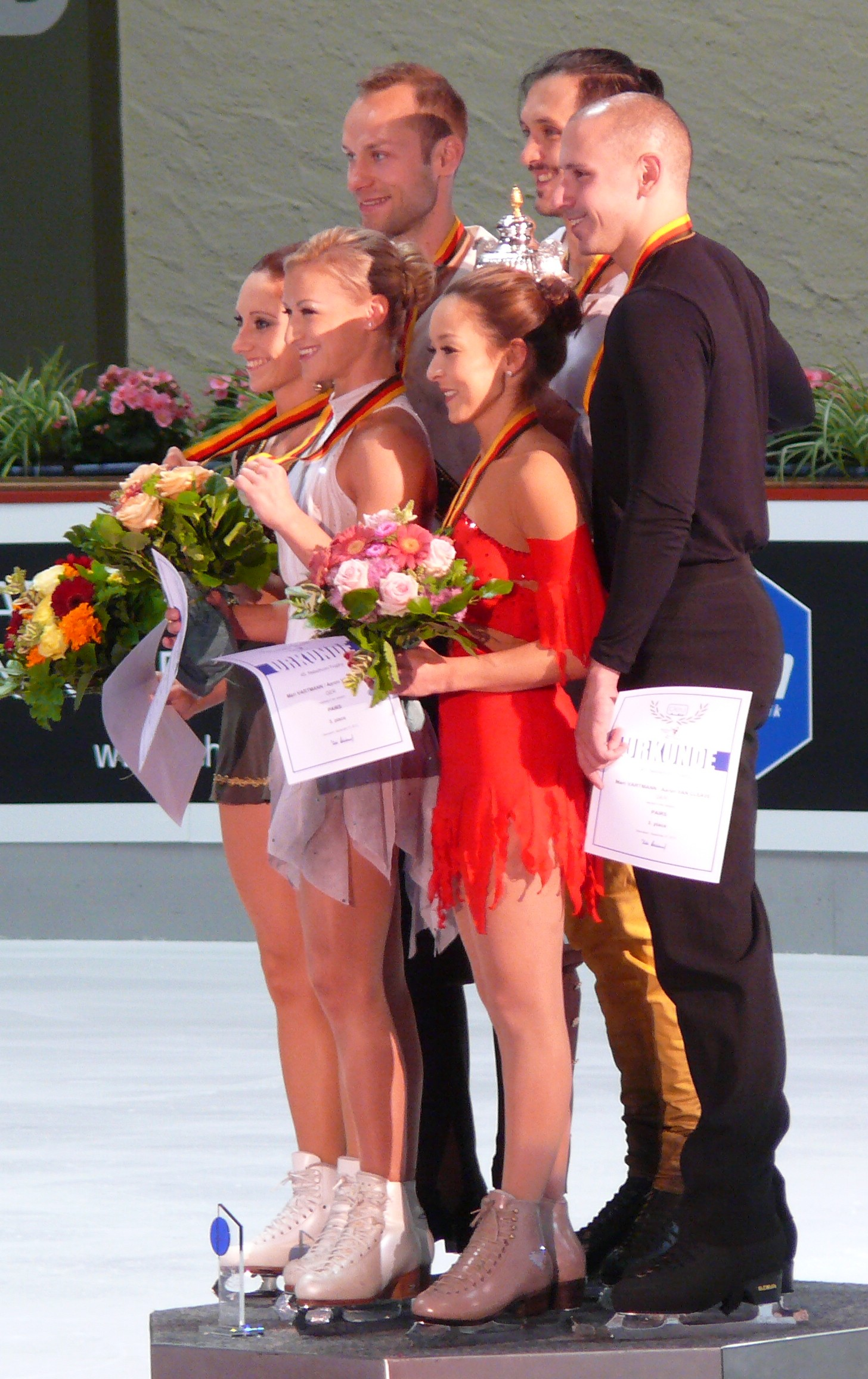
The Wendes, Volosozhar / Trankov, and Vartmann / Van Cleave stand on the pairs' podium

Rank	Name	Nation	Total points	SP		FS	
1	Tatiana Volosozhar / Maxim Trankov	Russia	231.96	1	81.65	1	150.31
2	Maylin Wende / Daniel Wende	Germany	174.88	2	61.00	2	113.88
3	Mari Vartmann / Aaron Van Cleave	Germany	162.81	4	56.70	3	106.11
4	Annabelle Prölß / Ruben Blommaert	Germany	158.38	5	55.24	4	103.14
5	Lindsay Davis / Rockne Brubaker	United States	156.91	6	54.04	5	102.87
6	Natasha Purich / Mervin Tran	Canada	156.15	3	56.71	6	99.44
7	Stacey Kemp / David King	United Kingdom	146.30 Q	7	51.33	7	94.97
8	Elizaveta Usmantseva / Roman Talan	Ukraine	141.45 Q	9	47.50	8	93.95
9	Natalja Zabijako / Alexandr Zaboev	Estonia	138.87 Q	11	45.08	9	93.79
10	Andrea Davidovich / Evgeni Krasnopolski	Israel	133.86 Q	15	40.83	10	93.03
11	Narumi Takahashi / Ryuichi Kihara	Japan	129.54 Q	8	49.42	13	80.12
12	Miriam Ziegler / Severin Kiefer	Austria	124.93 Q	10	45.69	14	79.24
13	So Hyang Pak / Nam I Song	North Korea	123.54	13	42.53	11	81.01
14	Maria Paliakova / Nikita Bochkov	Belarus	120.93	16	40.31	12	80.62
15	Magdalena Klatka / Radosław Chruściński	Poland	120.90	12	43.65	15	77.25
16	Elizaveta Makarova / Leri Kenchadze	Bulgaria	115.29	14	41.30	16	73.99
17	Ronja Roll / Gustav Forsgren	Sweden	107.65	17	38.80	17	68.85
18	Veronica Grigorieva / Aritz Maestu	Spain	98.60	18	33.74	18	64.86
19	Olga Bestandigova / İlhan Mansız	Turkey	81.94	19	33.14	19	48.80

=== Ice dance ===
Rank	Name	Nation	Total points	SD		FD	
1	Madison Hubbell / Zachary Donohue	United States	147.11	2	56.53	1	90.58
2	Ksenia Monko / Kirill Khaliavin	Russia	142.14	3	55.90	2	86.24
3	Alexandra Paul / Mitchell Islam	Canada	141.99	1	59.06	3	82.93
4	Huang Xintong / Zheng Xun	China	133.90 Q	5	51.16	4	82.74
5	Alisa Agafonova / Alper Uçar	Turkey	127.53 Q	4	51.51	7	76.02
6	Danielle O'Brien / Gregory Merriman	Australia	127.20 Q	6	50.52	6	76.68
7	Cathy Reed / Chris Reed	Japan	126.97 Q	8	48.41	5	78.56
8	Sara Hurtado / Adrià Díaz	Spain	119.76 Q	10	46.68	11	73.08
9	Federica Testa / Lukas Csolley	Slovakia	118.93	9	48.30	14	70.63
10	Justyna Plutowska / Peter Gerber	Poland	118.86	14	43.88	8	74.98
11	Angelina Telegina / Otar Japaridze	Georgia	118.66	13	45.47	10	73.19
12	Shari Koch / Christian Nüchtern	Germany	118.11	7	49.17	17	68.94
13	Henna Lindholm / Ossi Kanervo	Finland	117.98	12	45.68	12	72.30
14	Ramona Elsener / Florian Roost	Switzerland	115.59	11	46.27	16	69.32
15	Siobhan Heekin-Canedy / Dmitri Dun	Ukraine	113.73	16	39.91	9	73.82
16	Gabriela Kubová / Matěj Novák	Czech Republic	111.17	18	39.24	13	71.93
17	Dóra Turóczi / Balázs Major	Hungary	109.95	17	39.74	15	70.21
18	Allison Reed / Vasili Rogov	Israel	109.91	15	42.64	18	67.27
19	Irina Shtork / Taavi Rand	Estonia	106.21	19	39.06	19	67.15
20	Kira Geil / Tobias Eisenbauer	Austria	99.09	20	36.75	20	62.34
21	Pilar Maekawa Moreno / Leonardo Maekawa Moreno	Mexico	91.72	22	32.03	21	59.69
22	Lesia Volodenkova / Vitali Vakunov	Belarus	78.89	21	33.26	22	45.63
