= Gennadi Krasnitski =

Soviet pair skater

Personal information
- Full name: Gennadi Viacheslavovich Krasnitski
- Other names: Gennadiy Vanisyan
- Born: 7 September 1968 (age 57) Moscow, Russian SFSR, Soviet Union

Figure skating career
- Country: Soviet Union
- Retired: 1990

Gennadi Viacheslavovich Krasnitski (Vanisyan) (Russian: Геннадий Вячеславович Красницкий (Ванисян), 7 September 1968) is a former Soviet pair skater. He is a two-time (1986, 1987) World Junior champion with partner Elena Leonova.

Krasnitski works as a coach at the Ice House in Hackensack, New Jersey. He coached Andrea Davidovich / Evgeni Krasnopolski, the first Israeli pair to qualify for the Winter Olympics, and Estonia's Viktoria Shklover / Valdis Mintals.

== Results ==
Pairs with Elena Leonova

International
| Event | 1985–86 | 1986–87 | 1987–88 | 1988–89 | 1989–90 |
|---|---|---|---|---|---|
| NHK Trophy | | | 1st | | |
| Skate Canada | | | | | 1st |
| Nebelhorn | | | | | 1st |
| St. Gervais | | | | | 1st |
International: Junior
| Junior Worlds | 1st | 1st | | | |
National
| Soviet Champ. | | | | | 3rd |
