= Brooklee Han =

American-Australian figure skater

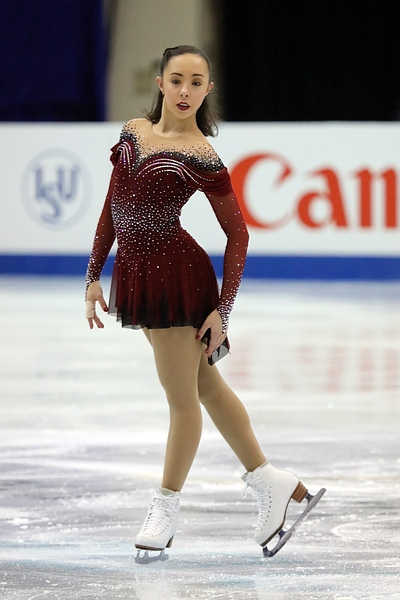
- Brooklee Han at the 2018 Four Continents Championships

Personal information
- Born: July 6, 1995 (age 31) Beverly, Massachusetts, United States
- Home town: Redding, Connecticut, United States
- Height: 150 cm (4 ft 11 in)

Figure skating career
- Country: Australia (2010–2019); United States (until 2009)
- Coach: Peter Cain, Darlene Cain
- Skating club: Stars FSC of Texas; Ice House FSC; Melbourne IFSC
- Began skating: 2000
- Retired: 1 July 2019

Brooklee Han (born July 6, 1995) is an American-Australian retired figure skater who represented Australia in ladies' singles. She is the 2018 CS Alpen Trophy bronze medalist, the 2013 Volvo Open Cup champion, the 2013 Australian national champion, and a five-time Australian national silver medalist (2012, 2014–2018).

She placed 20th at the 2014 Winter Olympics.

== Personal life ==
Brooklee Han was born in Beverly, Massachusetts. In 2013, she graduated from Joel Barlow High School in Redding, Connecticut. Later that year, she became a part-time student at Wesleyan University. She studied international relations and German before taking a leave of absence in 2016 in order to train in Texas. Her father is Australian.

Born to parents who were both equestrians, Han has also competed in dressage and eventing. She began playing the violin at age five. She started a community orchestra in her town and volunteers teaching violin to grade school students.

== Skating career ==
Brooklee Han began skating at age five in Brewster, New York. Serhii Vaypan became her coach in 2007. Han has trained at the Newington Arena in Newington, Connecticut, the International Skating Center of Connecticut in Simsbury, Connecticut, and Medibank Icehouse in Melbourne, Victoria.

The 2013 Nebelhorn Trophy was the qualifying competition for the 2014 Winter Olympics for countries which had not qualified an entry in a figure skating discipline at the 2013 Worlds. In August 2013, Australian skater Chantelle Kerry argued before the Australian Court of Arbitration for Sport that Han should not compete at Nebelhorn Trophy because she did not compete at the inaugural Skate Down Under competition, which was used as the Australian qualification event to select skaters for the Nebelhorn Trophy. That claim was rejected and Han was selected to compete. Han finished fifth at the Nebelhorn Trophy and, as a result of her placement, Australia received one of the six remaining ladies' spots to the Olympics.

The dispute over the Olympic berth continued with claims that Han became ineligible after competing at a club event in America without the approval of the national federation. The Court of Arbitration for Sport heard the case in December 2013. Despite the court ruling that Han's participation could have led to her becoming ineligible, previous communications between the skater and Ice Skating Australia (ISA) showed that ISA had no objections to her competing in the event. The claim was ultimately rejected and Han was confirmed as Australia's ladies' representative at the Olympics. Han later finished 20th at the Olympics and 19th at the 2014 World Championships.

On June 27, 2014, Han was selected to compete at the 2014 Skate America, the first of six competitions in the 2014–15 Grand Prix series. After another skater withdrew, she was given a spot to the 2014 Skate Canada International. Han finished in 10th and 8th place, respectively.

In August 2016, Han relocated to Euless, Texas, to be coached by Peter Cain and Darlene Cain.

She announced her retirement from competitive skating on July 1, 2019.

== Programs ==
Season	Short program	Free skating
2018–2019	I Dreamed a Dream (from Les Misérables) by Claude-Michel Schönberg performed by Susan Boyle	West Side Story by Leonard Bernstein
2017–2018	I Dreamed a Dream (from Les Misérables) by Claude-Michel Schönberg performed by Susan Boyle	Por una cabeza by Carlos Gardel, Alfredo Le Pera choreo. by Evgeni Nemirovski
2016–2017	Dans la maison by Philippe Rombi choreo. by Serhii Vaypan	Por una cabeza by Carlos Gardel, Alfredo Le Pera choreo. by Evgeni Nemirovski; Day of Wrath by Bogdan Ota
2015–2016	Dans la maison by Philippe Rombi choreo. by Serhii Vaypan	The Lark Ascending by Ralph Vaughan Williams choreo. by Rohene Ward
2014–2015	A Single Man; W.E. by Abel Korzeniowski	Secret by Jay Chou
2013–2014	Prayer for Taylor by Michael Smith; Titanic Symphony by Richard Clayderman	Secret by Jay Chou
2012–2013	Freedom by Michael Smith; Titanic Symphony by Richard Clayderman	Ave Maria (Vavilov)
2011–2012	Take Five; Unsquare Dance by Dave Brubeck	Ave Maria (Vavilov)
2010–2011	Take Five; Unsquare Dance by Dave Brubeck	When My Mother Sings by Richard Clayderman, James Last

== Competitive highlights ==
GP: Grand Prix; CS: Challenger Series; JGP: Junior Grand Prix

International
Event	10–11	11–12	12–13	13–14	14–15	15–16	16–17	17–18	18–19
Olympics				20th					
Worlds			21st	19th	35th				
Four Continents			12th	14th	17th	17th	14th	14th	WD
GP France						10th			
GP Skate Canada					8th				
GP Skate America					10th				
CS Alpen Trophy									3rd
CS Autumn Classic								7th	10th
CS Denkova-Staviski						6th			
CS Finlandia								8th	
CS Nebelhorn					4th	7th	11th		9th
CS U.S. Classic					6th	10th		7th	
Bavarian Open									WD
Merano Cup			3rd						
Nebelhorn Trophy			8th	5th					
Reykjavík Int. Games							2nd		
Triglav Trophy		6th					1st		
Volvo Open Cup				1st					
International: Junior
Junior Worlds	21st	30th	16th						
JGP Australia		8th							
JGP Czech Republic				11th					
JGP Germany	17th								
JGP Italy		13th							
JGP Mexico				8th					
JGP Turkey			12th						
JGP U.K.	10th								
JGP U.S.			8th						
Bavarian Open	2nd								
National
Australian Champ.			2nd	1st	2nd	2nd	2nd		2nd
TBD = Assigned; WD = Withdrew
