= Figure skating at the 2014 Winter Olympics – Pairs =

Pair skating at the XXII Olympic Winter Games
- Venue: Iceberg Skating Palace; Sochi, Russia
- Dates: 11–12 February 2014
- Competitors: 20 teams from 12 nations
- Winning score: 236.86 points

Medalists
1st place, gold medalist(s)		Tatiana Volosozhar and Maxim Trankov	Russia
2nd place, silver medalist(s)		Ksenia Stolbova and Fedor Klimov	Russia
3rd place, bronze medalist(s)		Aljona Savchenko and Robin Szolkowy	Germany

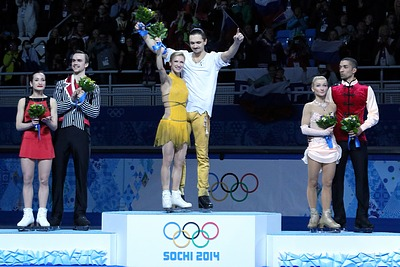
The medalists from the pairs' event at the 2014 Winter Olympics (from left to right): Ksenia Stolbova and Fedor Klimov of Russia (silver); Tatiana Volosozhar and Maxim Trankov of Russia (gold); and Aljona Savchenko and Robin Szolkowy of Germany (bronze)

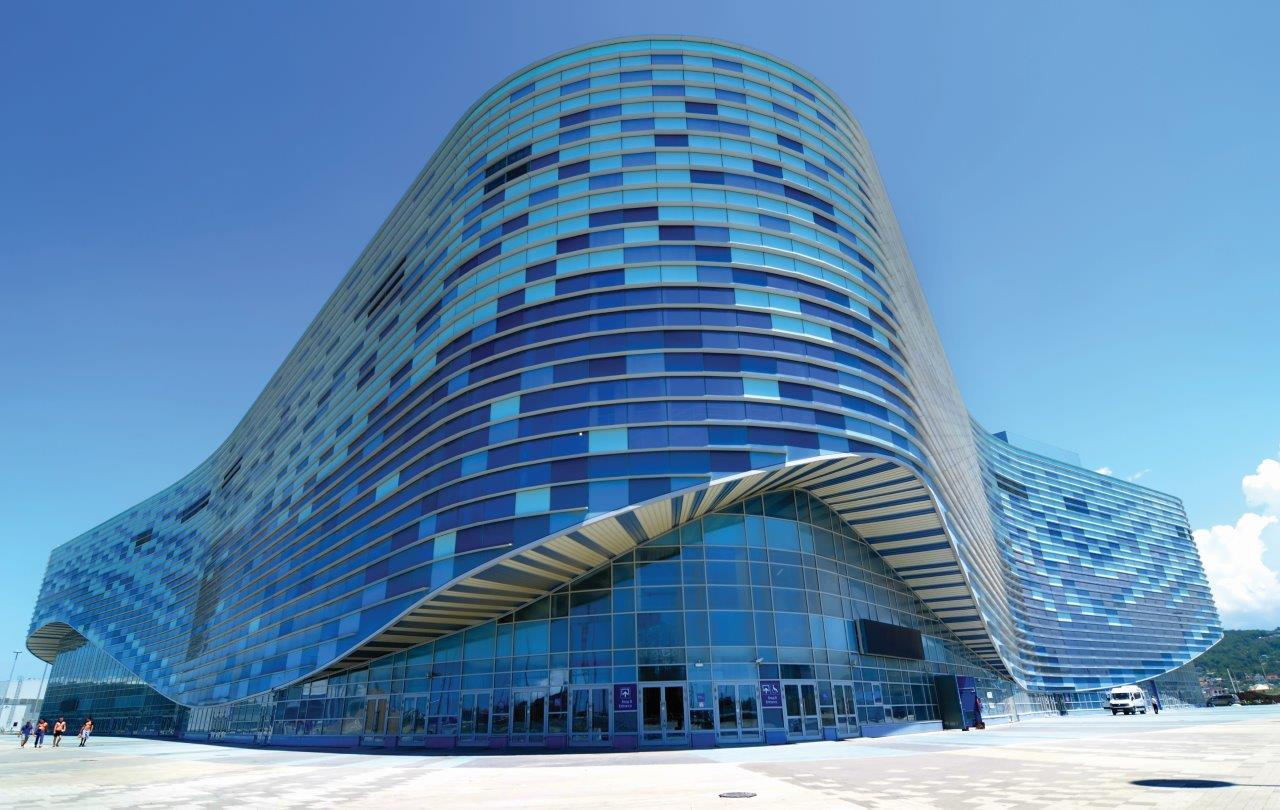
The figure skating events at the 2014 Winter Olympics were held at the Iceberg Skating Palace in Sochi, Russia.

The pairs figure skating competition at the 2014 Winter Olympics was held on 11 and 12 February 2014 at the Iceberg Skating Palace in Sochi, Russia, and featured 20 teams from 12 nations. Tatiana Volosozhar and Maxim Trankov of Russia won the gold medals, while Ksenia Stolbova and Fedor Klimov, also of Russia, won the silver, and Aljona Savchenko and Robin Szolkowy of Germany won the bronze. Having been part of the team that earlier won the team event, Volosozhar and Trankov became the first figure skaters to win two gold medals at the same Olympics. In addition to their gold medals, they also set a new world record score in the short program. Savchenko and Szolkowy had also finished in third place at the 2010 Winter Olympics, giving them back-to-back bronze medals.

== Background ==
The pair skating event was one of five figure skating competitions contested at the 2014 Winter Olympics in Sochi, Russia. It was held at the Iceberg Skating Palace over two days: the short program took place on 11 February 2014 and the free skating on 12 February 2014. The competition featured 20 teams representing 12 nations. Tatiana Volosozhar and Maxim Trankov of Russia, and Aljona Savchenko and Robin Szolkowy of Germany, were the leading candidates projected to win the pairs event. Volosozhar and Trankov had won the 2013 World Figure Skating Championships and the 2012–13 Grand Prix of Figure Skating Final, and were three-time European champions and two-time Russian national champions. With her previous partner Stanislav Morozov, Volosozhar had competed for Ukraine at both the 2006 and 2010 Winter Olympics; they finished eighth in 2010. Savchenko and Szolkowy had won the bronze medals at the 2010 Winter Olympics and were four-time world champions, four-time European champions, four-time Grand Prix Final champions, and eight-time German national champions. This was Savchenko's fourth appearance at the Olympics: she had competed for Ukraine in 2002 with Stanislav Morozov, and for Germany in 2006 and 2010 with Szolkowy.

== Qualification ==
Sixteen quota spots in the pairs event were awarded based on the results at the 2013 World Figure Skating Championships. An additional four quota spots were earned at the 2013 Nebelhorn Trophy.

Estonia had originally qualified one quota spot at the 2013 World Championships; however, they relinquished that spot when Alexandr Zaboev was unable to secure Estonian citizenship. Likewise, France had originally qualified two quota spots. However, when Daria Popova was unable to secure French citizenship, France relinquished one of their spots. Those vacated spots were re-allocated to Japan and Austria.

Qualifying nations in pairs
Event	Teams per NOC	Qualifying NOCs	Total teams
2013 World Championships	3	Russia; Canada	15
2013 World Championships	2	Germany; China; ~~France~~; United States; Italy	15
2013 World Championships	1	France	15
2013 Nebelhorn Trophy	1	Great Britain; Ukraine; ~~Estonia~~; Israel; Japan; Austria	5
Total			20

== Required performance elements ==
Couples competing in pair skating performed their short programs on 11 February 2014. Lasting at most 2 minutes 50 seconds, it had to include the following elements: one lasso lift, one double or triple twist lift, one double or triple throw jump, one double or triple solo jump, one pair spin combination with a change of foot, one death spiral, and a step sequence using the full ice surface.

The top sixteen couples after completion of the short program moved on to the free skating, which was performed on 12 February 2014. The free skate could last no more than 4 minutes 30 seconds (+/− 10 seconds), and had to include the following: three pair lifts, one twist lift, two different throw jumps, one solo jump, one jump combination or sequence, one solo spin combination, one pair spin combination, one death spiral, and a choreographic sequence.

== Judging ==
Skaters were judged according to the required technical elements of their program (such as jumps and spins), as well as the overall presentation of their program, based on five program components (skating skills, transitions, performance/execution, composition/choreography, and musical interpretation). Each technical element in a figure skating performance was assigned a predetermined base point value and scored by a panel of nine judges on a scale from −3 to +3 based on the quality of its execution. Each Grade of Execution (GOE) from –3 to +3 was assigned a value as indicated on the Scale of Values. For example, a triple Axel was worth a base value of 8.50 points, and a GOE of +3 was worth 3.00 points, so a triple Axel with a GOE of +3 earned 11.50 points. The judging panel's GOE for each element was determined by calculating the trimmed mean (the average after discarding the highest and lowest scores). The panel's scores for all elements were added together to generate a Total Elements Score. At the same time, the judges evaluated each performance based on the five aforementioned program components and assigned each a score from 0.25 to 10 in 0.25-point increments. The judging panel's final score for each program component was also determined by calculating the trimmed mean. Those scores were then multiplied by the factor shown on the chart below; the results were added together to generate a total Program Component Score.

Program component factoring
Component	Short program	Free skating
Pairs	0.80	1.60

Deductions were applied for certain violations, such as time infractions or falls. The Total Elements Score and Program Component Score were then added together, minus any deductions, to generate a final performance score for each skater or team.

== Results ==
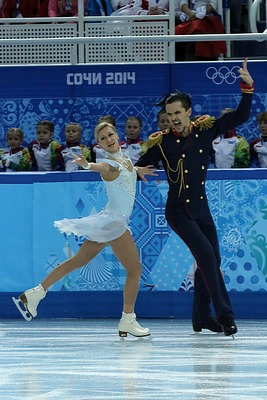
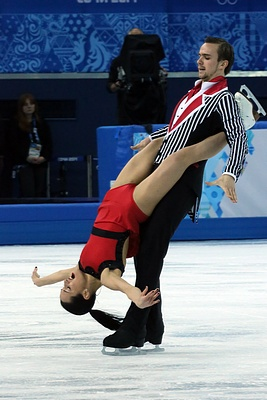
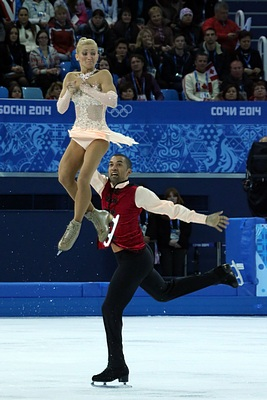
The gold, silver, and bronze medalists from the pairs event at the 2014 Winter Olympics (from left to right):
Tatiana Volosozhar and Maxim Trankov of Russia (gold); Ksenia Stolbova and Fedor Klimov of Russia (silver); and Aljona Savchenko and Robin Szolkowy of Germany (bronze)

Code key

- TSS – Total Segment Score
- TES – Total Elements Score
- PCS – Program Component Score
- SS – Skating skills
- TR – Transitions
- PE – Performance
- CH – Choreography/Composition
- IN – Musical interpretation
- DED – Deductions

=== Short program ===
The pairs short program was held on 11 February 2014. Tatiana Volosozhar and Maxim Trankov of Russia finished in first place. Performing to Masquerade by Aram Khachaturian, their score of 84.17 was a new world record, beating the previous world record, which had been set by them at the 2014 European Figure Skating Championships. Lyudmilla and Oleg Protopopov, two-time Olympic gold medalists in pair skating from the Soviet Union, were in attendance at the competition. A Soviet or Russian team had won the Olympic pairs event twelve times in a row beginning with the Protopopovs' first championship in 1964, until Shen Xue and Zhao Hongbo of China won the pairs event in 2010. Volosozhar and Trankov were anxious to return the pairs championship to Russia. "It is very important to give Russia back this tradition," Trankov said, while also acknowledging that the Protopopovs had made the trip back to Russia especially to watch the pairs event. In 1964, the Protopopovs defeated Marika Kilius and Hans-Jürgen Bäumler, the West German team who competed as part of the United Team of Germany, to begin a legacy of Russian dominance in pair skating. In 2014, Volosozhar and Trankov's strongest challengers were Aljona Savchenko and Robin Szolkowy of Germany, who finished in second place, while Ksenia Stolbova and Fedor Klimov of Russia finished in third.

Pairs short program results
Pl.	Team	Nation	TSS	TES	PCS	SS	TR	PE	CH	IN	DED
1	Tatiana Volosozhar; Maxim Trankov	Russia	84.17	45.46	38.71	9.61	9.39	9.79	9.71	9.89	0.00
2	Aljona Savchenko; Robin Szolkowy	Germany	79.64	43.46	36.18	8.93	8.79	9.29	9.11	9.11	0.00
3	Ksenia Stolbova; Fedor Klimov	Russia	75.21	41.46	33.75	8.46	8.11	8.61	8.39	8.61	0.00
4	Pang Qing; Tong Jian	China	73.30	39.33	33.97	8.54	8.14	8.54	8.54	8.71	0.00
5	Meagan Duhamel; Eric Radford	Canada	72.21	39.70	32.51	8.11	8.18	8.14	8.14	8.07	0.00
6	Kirsten Moore-Towers; Dylan Moscovitch	Canada	70.92	38.69	32.23	7.96	7.93	8.07	8.11	8.21	0.00
7	Peng Cheng; Zhang Hao	China	70.59	40.89	29.70	7.64	7.18	7.39	7.43	7.50	0.00
8	Vera Bazarova; Yuri Larionov	Russia	69.66	37.49	32.17	8.00	7.75	8.18	8.11	8.18	0.00
9	Marissa Castelli; Simon Shnapir	United States	67.44	37.87	29.57	7.29	7.25	7.50	7.46	7.46	0.00
10	Vanessa James; Morgan Ciprès	France	65.36	36.19	29.17	7.36	7.14	7.36	7.21	7.39	0.00
11	Stefania Berton; Ondřej Hotárek	Italy	63.57	32.90	30.67	7.54	7.57	7.61	7.86	7.75	0.00
12	Maylin Wende; Daniel Wende	Germany	59.25	33.20	27.05	6.93	6.57	6.68	6.75	6.89	1.00
13	Paige Lawrence; Rudi Swiegers	Canada	58.97	32.69	26.28	6.39	6.43	6.71	6.61	6.71	0.00
14	Felicia Zhang; Nathan Bartholomay	United States	56.90	32.07	24.83	6.18	6.07	6.25	6.36	6.18	0.00
15	Andrea Davidovich; Evgeni Krasnopolski	Israel	53.38	30.24	23.14	5.89	5.61	5.82	5.89	5.71	0.00
16	Nicole Della Monica; Matteo Guarise	Italy	51.64	30.76	21.88	5.57	5.25	5.46	5.64	5.43	1.00
17	Miriam Ziegler; Severin Kiefer	Austria	49.62	28.36	21.26	5.43	5.04	5.39	5.36	5.36	0.00
18	Narumi Takahashi; Ryuichi Kihara	Japan	48.45	27.48	20.97	5.43	4.96	5.29	5.29	5.25	0.00
19	Stacey Kemp; David King	Great Britain	44.98	24.66	21.32	5.36	5.25	5.25	5.50	5.29	1.00
20	Julia Lavrentieva; Yuri Rudyk	Ukraine	44.30	23.33	20.97	5.39	4.93	5.29	5.36	5.25	0.00

=== Free skating ===
The pairs free skate was held on 12 February 2014. Performing to music from Jesus Christ Superstar, Tatiana Volosozhar and Maxim Trankov finished in first place, winning the gold medals. Having been part of the Russian team that earlier won the team event, they became the first figure skaters to win two gold medals at the same Olympics. Trankov spoke of the pressure that he and Volosozhar felt to win the gold that had been Russia's provenance until 2010. "We understood we were at home and had no right to make a mistake," he stated afterward. "We had an obligation to bring the gold back to Russia." Volosozhar and Trankov made some errors in their free skate, but Aljona Savchenko and Robin Szolkowy, who had been in second place after the short program, made two significant errors that led them to ultimately finish in third place. Szolkowy fell on a triple toe loop-triple toe loop jump combination, while Savchenko fell on their throw triple Salchow. Having also won the bronze medals at the 2010 Winter Olympics, this marked back-to-back bronze medals for Savchenko and Szolkowy.

Ksenia Stolbova and Fedor Klimov, who had been in third place after the short program, finished in second place and won the silver medals. Their routine, set to music from The Addams Family, featured a throw triple Salchow at the very end, which Stolbova landed effortlessly. Pang Qing and Tong Jian of China, who had won the silver medals at the 2010 Winter Olympics, finished in fourth place, while Marissa Castelli and Simon Shnapir of the United States finished in ninth place. Castelli and Shnapir had been part of the American team that had won the bronze medals in the team event, and improved on their performance here. Castelli landed their throw quadruple Salchow, which allowed them to set a new personal-best score.

Pairs free skate results
Pl.	Team	Nation	TSS	TES	PCS	SS	TR	PE	CH	IN	DED
1	Tatiana Volosozhar; Maxim Trankov	Russia	152.69	74.86	77.83	9.61	9.46	9.82	9.79	9.96	0.00
2	Ksenia Stolbova; Fedor Klimov	Russia	143.47	72.27	71.20	8.71	8.61	9.00	9.04	9.14	0.00
3	Pang Qing; Tong Jian	China	136.58	67.62	68.96	8.57	8.43	8.57	8.71	8.82	0.00
4	Aljona Savchenko; Robin Szolkowy	Germany	136.14	66.95	71.19	8.96	8.79	8.64	9.04	9.07	2.00
5	Kirsten Moore-Towers; Dylan Moscovitch	Canada	131.18	64.91	66.27	8.21	8.00	8.32	8.39	8.50	0.00
6	Vera Bazarova; Yuri Larionov	Russia	129.94	65.04	64.90	8.07	7.96	8.00	8.32	8.21	0.00
7	Meagan Duhamel; Eric Radford	Canada	127.32	64.25	64.07	8.00	8.11	7.93	8.07	7.93	1.00
8	Peng Cheng; Zhang Hao	China	125.13	64.81	61.32	7.86	7.50	7.57	7.71	7.68	1.00
9	Marissa Castelli; Simon Shnapir	United States	120.38	61.25	59.13	7.39	7.29	7.43	7.46	7.39	0.00
10	Stefania Berton; Ondřej Hotárek	Italy	115.51	58.68	57.83	7.25	7.18	6.96	7.46	7.29	1.00
11	Vanessa James; Morgan Ciprès	France	114.07	57.74	58.33	7.39	7.18	7.21	7.39	7.29	2.00
12	Felicia Zhang; Nathan Bartholomay	United States	110.31	60.11	50.20	6.36	6.11	6.29	6.36	6.25	0.00
13	Maylin Wende; Daniel Wende	Germany	107.00	52.12	54.88	6.86	6.79	6.61	7.00	7.04	0.00
14	Paige Lawrence; Rudi Swiegers	Canada	103.01	53.83	50.18	6.36	6.18	6.11	6.39	6.32	1.00
15	Andrea Davidovich; Evgeni Krasnopolski	Israel	94.35	48.22	47.13	5.96	5.82	5.79	6.07	5.82	1.00
16	Nicole Della Monica; Matteo Guarise	Italy	86.22	43.38	44.84	5.71	5.64	5.32	5.82	5.54	2.00

=== Overall ===
Pairs results
Rank	Team	Nation	Total	SP		FS	
1st place, gold medalist(s)	Tatiana Volosozhar; Maxim Trankov	Russia	236.86	1	84.17	1	152.69
2nd place, silver medalist(s)	Ksenia Stolbova; Fedor Klimov	Russia	218.68	3	75.21	2	143.47
3rd place, bronze medalist(s)	Aljona Savchenko; Robin Szolkowy	Germany	215.78	2	79.64	4	136.14
4	Pang Qing; Tong Jian	China	209.88	4	73.30	3	136.58
5	Kirsten Moore-Towers; Dylan Moscovitch	Canada	202.10	6	70.92	5	131.18
6	Vera Bazarova; Yuri Larionov	Russia	199.60	8	69.66	6	129.94
7	Meagan Duhamel; Eric Radford	Canada	199.53	5	72.21	7	127.32
8	Peng Cheng; Zhang Hao	China	195.72	7	70.59	8	125.13
9	Marissa Castelli; Simon Shnapir	United States	187.82	9	67.44	9	120.28
10	Vanessa James; Morgan Ciprès	France	179.43	10	65.36	11	114.07
11	Stefania Berton; Ondřej Hotárek	Italy	179.08	11	63.57	10	115.51
12	Felicia Zhang; Nathan Bartholomay	United States	167.21	14	56.90	12	110.31
13	Maylin Wende; Daniel Wende	Germany	166.25	12	59.25	13	107.00
14	Paige Lawrence; Rudi Swiegers	Canada	161.98	13	58.97	14	103.01
15	Andrea Davidovich; Evgeni Krasnopolski	Israel	147.73	15	53.38	15	94.35
16	Nicole Della Monica; Matteo Guarise	Italy	137.86	16	51.64	16	86.22
17	Miriam Ziegler; Severin Kiefer	Austria	49.62	17	49.62	Did not advance to free skate	
18	Narumi Takahashi; Ryuichi Kihara	Japan	48.45	18	48.45	Did not advance to free skate	
19	Stacey Kemp; David King	Great Britain	44.98	19	44.98	Did not advance to free skate	
20	Julia Lavrentieva; Yuri Rudyk	Ukraine	44.30	20	44.30	Did not advance to free skate	

== Records ==
The following new record high score was set during this competition.

Record high scores
Date	Team	Segment	Score	Ref.
11 February	(Russia); Tatiana Volosozhar; Maxim Trankov	Short program	84.17	

== Works cited ==
- "International Skating Union – Special Regulations & Technical Rules – Single & Pair Skating and Ice Dance 2012" (PDF). International Skating Union. June 2012. Archived from the original (PDF) on 22 February 2014.
