= Yakov Godorozha =

Ukrainian figure skater

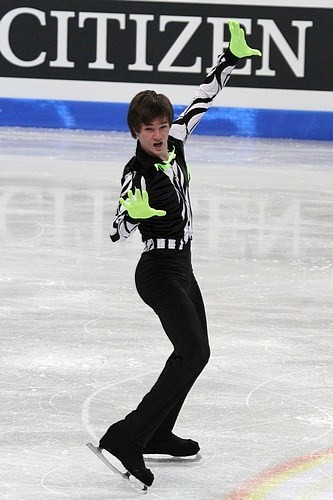

Personal information
- Native name: Яків Семенович Годорожа
- Full name: Yakiv Semenovych Hodorozha
- Born: 18 May 1993 (age 33) Odesa, Ukraine
- Height: 1.85 m (6 ft 1 in)

Figure skating career
- Country: Ukraine
- Skating club: Spartak Odesa
- Began skating: 1998
- Retired: August 2014

Yakov Godorozha (Ukrainian: Яків Семенович Годорожа: Yakiv Semenovych Hodorozha; born 18 May 1993) is a Ukrainian former competitive figure skater. He is a two-time Ukrainian national champion (2013, 2014). He began learning to skate under the guidance of Georgi Starkov at the Ldinka rink in Odesa, and later trained in Dnipropetrovsk and Kyiv, where he was coached by Marina Amirkhanova. At the 2013 Nebelhorn Trophy, Godorozha earned a spot for Ukraine in the men's event at the 2014 Winter Olympics. He finished 20th in Sochi. He retired from competition in August 2014.

== Programs ==
Season	Short program	Free skating
2013–14	Tosca (new arrangement) by Giacomo Puccini	Westside Story by Leonard Bernstein
2011–13	Factor by Angelo Badalmento	Pictures at an Exhibition by Modest Mussorgsky
2009–11	Circus Princess by Emmerich Kálmán	Pictures at an Exhibition by Modest Mussorgsky
2008–09	Popodyak (Gypsy theme)	The Pirates of the Caribbean

== Competitive highlights ==
JGP: Junior Grand Prix

International
Event	07–08	08–09	09–10	10–11	11–12	12–13	13–14
Olympics							20th
Worlds						23rd	25th
Europeans						15th	22nd
Cup of Nice						20th	
Golden Spin					14th		
Ice Star						1st	
Nebelhorn						19th	9th
Volvo Open Cup							14th
International: Junior or novice
Junior Worlds					25th		
JGP Belarus		15th					
JGP Estonia					8th		
JGP Germany			14th				
JGP Italy		20th					
JGP Romania				12th	8th		
Tirnavia Ice Cup			2nd J.	2nd J.			
Grand Prize SNP	1st N.						
National
Ukrainian Champ.	6th	5th	4th	4th	3rd	1st	1st
Team events
Olympics							9th T 8th P
Levels – N: Novice; J: Junior
