= Luiz Manella =

Brazilian figure skater

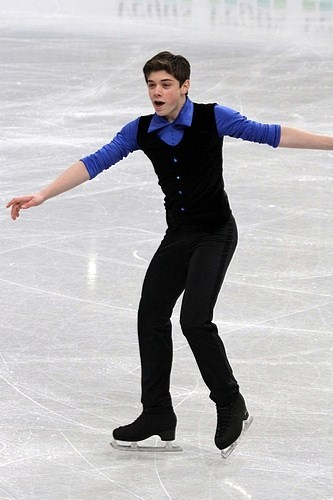
- Manella in 2012

Personal information
- Born: February 1, 1995 (age 31) Londrina, Brazil
- Home town: Miami, Florida
- Height: 1.68 m (5 ft 6 in)

Figure skating career
- Country: Brazil
- Coach: Artem Torgashev, Ilona Melnichenko, Andrei Kriukov, Kent Johnson
- Began skating: 2007

Luiz Fernando Manella Pereira (born February 1, 1995, in Londrina, Brazil) is a Brazilian former competitive figure skater. He competed in the free skate at three ISU Championships – 2012 Four Continents in Colorado Springs, Colorado, United States; 2012 Junior Worlds in Minsk, Belarus; and 2013 Junior Worlds in Milan, Italy, being the second male figure skater to ever represent Brazil at an ISU competition. He was awarded the best figure skater in Brazil prize by the Brazilian Olympic Committee in 2011. In 2015, he was chosen the Brazilian embassador for the 2016 Winter Youth Olympic Games by the Brazilian Olympic Committee.

== Personal life ==
Manella moved to Miami when he was eight years old.

== Career ==
Luiz Manella started skating lessons when we was 12, in order to be able to play ice hockey, however, figure skating caught his attention and a year later he switched. In 2009, he took part in American local competitions.

In 2010, his then coach got in touch with the Brazilian Ice Sports Federation, who invited Manella to represent the country at JGP Ostrava, which was his first official competition as a Brazilian skater.

Manella competed exclusively as a junior up until the 2012-13 season, when he changed coaches with the goal of getting the first ever figure skating spot for Brazil at the Winter Olympic Games. His first senior international competition was the 2013 US Classic where he finished in 10th place. At the 2013 Junior Worlds, he managed to get the best ever result for a Brazilian skater after he finished in 15th place, although not being able to directly get a spot for the Olympics. He tried again to get an Olympic spot at the 2013 Nebelhorn Trophy but was unsuccessful, becoming second alternate.

In the next season, the Brazilian federation suggested him to switch to pair skating with Karolina Calhoun, who was also a Brazilian junior skater, however the plans were not successful after Calhoun got injured. In late 2014, Manella was invited to train with Hwi Choi, from South Korea. They were coached by Ingo Steuer, until Manella retired due to injury.

== Programs ==
Season	Short program	Free skating
2013–2014	A Day in the Life by The Beatles	Gladiator by Hans Zimmer
2012–2013	Matrix by Don Davis	Gladiator by Hans Zimmer
2011–2012	Take Five by Paul Desmond	Xotica by René Dupéré; Ancient Lands by Ronan Hardiman

== Results ==
International
Event	2010–11	2011–12	2012–13	2013–14
Four Continents		22nd		
Nebelhorn Trophy			23rd	12th
U.S. Classic			10th	
International: Junior
Junior Worlds		16th	15th	
JGP Czech Republic	15th			
JGP Italy		7th		
JGP Latvia				WD
JGP = Junior Grand Prix; WD = Withdrew
