= Jelena Glebova =

Estonian figure skater

Elena Glebova
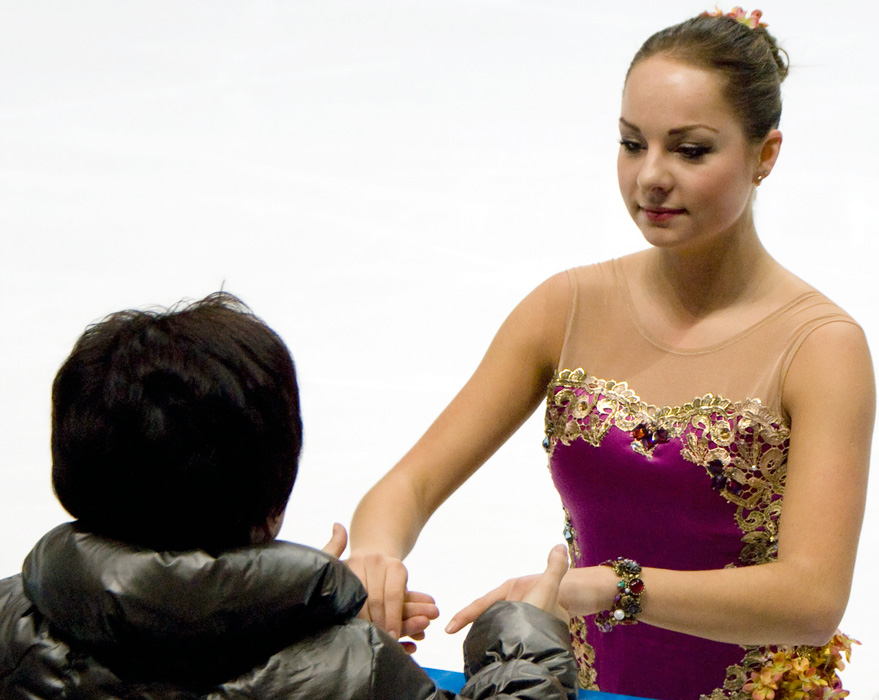
- Glebova and her former coach Levandi at 2010 Cup of Russia

Personal information
- Born: 16 June 1989 (age 37) Tallinn, then part of Estonian SSR, Soviet Union
- Height: 1.66 m (5 ft 5 in)

Figure skating career
- Country: Estonia
- Began skating: 1995
- Retired: May 2014

Elena Glebova (born 16 June 1989) is an Estonian former competitive figure skater. She won five senior international medals (three gold, two silver) and seven Estonian national titles. She finished as high as seventh at the European Championships (2014) and 13th at the World Championships (2012).

== Skating career ==
Glebova started skating when she was five years old after watching her brother practice. She trained in Estonia with coach Irina Kononova from the age of 5 to 12, and then with Anna Levandi for ten years.

Glebova appeared at her first World Junior Championships in 2004 and debuted at the European and World Championships in 2005. In 2006, she competed at the 2006 Winter Olympics in Turin, Italy, finishing 28th. In 2007, she achieved her best World Junior result, sixth in Oberstdorf. In 2010, she placed 21st at the Vancouver Olympics.

In 2011, Glebova moved from Estonia to Hackensack, New Jersey and began training with coaches Igor Krokavec and Craig Maurizi. She placed 13th at the 2012 World Championships in Nice, France. The next season, she finished 16th at the 2013 World Championships in London, Ontario. Her result qualified a spot for Estonia in the ladies' event at the 2014 Olympics.

In the 2013–14 season, Glebova finished seventh at the European Championships in Budapest, the best result of her career. She placed 29th at the 2014 Winter Olympics in Sochi. She retired from competition in May 2014.

== Personal life ==
Glebova has an elder brother, Ilja Glebov, who also competed in figure skating. As of 2014, she worked for Tallinn's city council.

== Programs ==
Season	Short program	Free skating	Exhibition
2013–2014	Love in Three Acts by unknown choreo. by David Wilson	Cleopatra by unknown choreo. by Shae-Lynn Bourne	
2012–2013	Tales and Legends by Rolando Tambin choreo. by Vakhtang Murvanidze	Black Magic Woman by Carlos Santana choreo. by Lea Ann Miller	
2011–2012	Angels & Demons (film) by Hans Zimmer	Spartacus (ballet) by Aram Khachaturian	
2010–2011	Sex and the City soundtrack	Capriccio Espagnol by Nikolai Rimsky-Korsakov	Ooh La La by Goldfrapp
2009–2010	East of Eden by Lee Holdridge	Capriccio Espagnol by Nikolai Rimsky-Korsakov	Ooh La La by Goldfrapp
2008–2009	Songs My Mother Taught Me by Antonín Dvořák	Piano Concert in A minor by Edvard Grieg; Carmina Burana by Carl Orff	
2007–2008	Concierto de Aranjuez by Joaquín Rodrigo	Allegro Molto Moderato by Edvard Grieg	
2006–2007	Tango De Los Exilados performed by Vanessa-Mae	Bohemian Rhapsody by Freddie Mercury	
2005–2006	Liebestraum by Franz Liszt	Bohemian Rhapsody by Freddie Mercury	
2004–2005	Liebestraum by Franz Liszt	Salomé (2002 film) by Roque Baños	
2003–2004	Lord of the Dance by Ronan Hardiman	The Last Emperor by Ryuichi Sakamoto, David Byrne	

== Competitive highlights ==
Results
International
Event	2002–03	2003–04	2004–05	2005–06	2006–07	2007–08	2008–09	2009–10	2010–11	2011–12	2012–13	2013–14
Olympics				28th				21st				29th
Worlds			33rd		18th	15th	16th	21st	22nd	13th	16th	26th
Europeans			25th	15th	12th		12th	10th		11th	13th	7th
GP Bompard						6th					7th	
GP Cup of Russia							6th		10th			
GP Skate America								5th				
GP Skate Canada						8th	11th					
Crystal Skate				7th						1st		
Finlandia					5th				6th	2nd		
Ice Challenge								4th				
Karl Schäfer				5th			2nd					
Merano Cup										1st		
Nebelhorn			12th			6th	4th	9th			4th	11th
NRW Trophy									7th			1st
Ondrej Nepela				7th								
U.S. Classic											4th	
Universiade							4th		7th			4th
International: Junior
Junior Worlds		27th	20th	11th	6th	11th						
JGP Bulgaria		16th										
JGP Czech Rep.					3rd							
JGP Estonia				6th								
JGP Hungary					6th							
JGP Poland		25th										
JGP Ukraine			13th									
JGP USA			8th									
Warsaw Cup					2nd J.							
National
Estonian	3rd J.	1st	1st	2nd	1st		1st	1st	3rd	1st	1st	
Team events
Japan Open								1T/5P				
GP = Grand Prix; JGP = Junior Grand Prix; J. = Junior level; WD = Withdrew; T = Team result; P = Personal result; Medals awarded for team result only.
