= Isadora Williams =

Brazilian-American figure skater (born 1996)

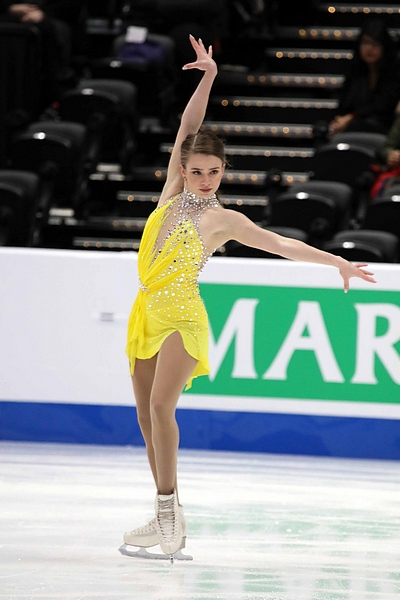
- Williams in 2019

Personal information
- Full name: Isadora Marie Williams
- Born: February 8, 1996 (age 30) Marietta, Georgia, U.S.
- Home town: Ashburn, Virginia, U.S.
- Height: 5 ft 4 in (1.62 m)

Figure skating career
- Country: Brazil (2009–2021); United States (until 2009)
- Coach: Igor Lukanin, Kristin Fraser
- Skating club: Brazilian Ice Sports Federation Ashburn, Virginia, U.S.
- Began skating: 2000
- Retired: October 23, 2021

Isadora Marie Williams (born February 8, 1996) is a retired Brazilian-American figure skater who represented Brazil in ladies' singles. She is the 2017 Sofia Trophy champion, the 2019 Toruń Cup silver medalist, the 2018 Volvo Open Cup silver medalist, the 2016 Santa Claus Cup silver medalist, and the 2016 Sportland Trophy silver medalist.

She placed 30th at the 2014 Winter Olympics and 24th at the 2018 Winter Olympics. Williams is the first figure skater from Brazil to compete at the Olympics and the first South American skater to ever reach the free skating segment at the games. She retired from competition in October 2021, after failing to qualify to the 2022 Winter Olympics due to a foot injury.

== Personal life ==
Williams was born in Marietta, Georgia. Isadora was raised in the suburbs of Washington, DC. She has Brazilian citizenship through her mother, who is from Belo Horizonte, Minas Gerais, and also lived in Brazil for two years as a child. Isadora Williams also has a very large family that lives in Brazil, which she visits frequently. She attends Montclair State University in New Jersey.

== Career ==
Isadora Williams began skating at the age of 5 falling in love with the sport while skating in a public session at the Cooler Ice Rink in Alpharetta, Georgia. She competed domestically for the United States as a child at the juvenile through the intermediate levels until 2009.

At the 2010 World Junior Championships, Williams became the third skater in any discipline to represent Brazil at the event. Her highest Junior Worlds placement was 16th in 2012.

In September 2013, Williams competed at the Nebelhorn Trophy, the final qualifying competition for the 2014 Winter Olympics in Sochi. She placed 8th in the short program and 14th in the free skate, finishing 12th overall. As a result of her placement, Brazil received one of the six remaining spots for countries which had not previously qualified for a ladies' entry. This was the first ever ladies' figure skating Olympics entry for Brazil. Williams finished in last place (30th) at the Olympic contest.

In the 2016-2017 season, Williams earned the first gold medal for a Brazilian skater in an international competition at the 2017 Sofia Trophy.

In 2017, she placed 5th overall at Nebelhorn to once again qualify for the 2018 Winter Olympics. Also in 2017 she placed 2nd at Volvo Open Cup, competition held in Riga, Latvia.

During the Olympic tournament, Williams made history by finishing 17th in the short program, enough to become the first Brazilian and South American to ever take part in the skating final. She placed 24th in the Free Skate and placed 24th overall.

She also became the first Brazilian and South American female skater to ever advance to the final segment of a senior World Championship at 2019 Worlds in Japan. She placed 24th in the short and in the free, finishing 24th overall.

In 2021, Williams failed to qualify to the Olympic Games for a third time after withdrawing from the free skating at Nebelhorn, where she placed 32nd after the short program. Later, she claimed her foot had become injured during the off season and it was taking a long time to heal. This was her last international competition, as she announced her retirement plans shortly after. She stated her wish was that the last competition of her career would be the 2021 Brazilian Nationals, but she didn't manage to recover in time and withdrew her entry.

== Programs ==
Season	Short program	Free skating	Exhibition
2021–2022	Bound To You (from Burlesque) by Christina Aguilera	Never Enough (from The Greatest Showman) by Benj Pasek and Justin Paul performed by Loren Allred	
2019–2021	Take Five by Dave Brubeck	Never Enough (from The Greatest Showman) by Benj Pasek and Justin Paul performed by Loren Allred	
2018–2019	Take Five by Dave Brubeck	Malaguenã by Ernesto Lecuona; Rocio de todos los campos by Natalia Lafourcade	Vai Malandra by Anitta
2017–2018	Hallelujah by Leonard Cohen performed by k.d. lang	Nyah (from Mission: Impossible II) by Hans Zimmer	Hallelujah performed by k.d. lang
2016–2017	Black Magic Woman by Santana	Nyah (from Mission: Impossible II) by Hans Zimmer	
2015–2016	At Last by Etta James	Brazilian medley by Jorge Ben Jor	
2014–2015	Stairway to Heaven	Brazilian medley by Jorge Ben Jor	Brasileirinho
2013–2014	Dark Eyes performed by Devotchka	Memoirs of a Geisha by John Williams	Brazilian medley by Jorge Ben Jor
2012–2013	Maria and the Violin's String by Ashram	Memoirs of a Geisha by John Williams	
2011–2012	Tango de los Exilados by Walter Taieb, Vanessa-Mae	Sheherazade by Nikolai Rimsky-Korsakov	
2009–2011	Bolero by Maurice Ravel	Sheherazade by Nikolai Rimsky-Korsakov	

== Results ==
CS: Challenger Series; JGP: Junior Grand Prix

International
Event	09–10	10–11	11–12	12–13	13–14	14–15	15–16	16–17	17–18	18–19	19–20	20–21	21–22
Olympics					30th				24th				
Worlds				25th				30th	35th	24th	C		
Four Continents						18th				17th			
CS Golden Spin										WD			
CS Nebelhorn								WD	5th				WD
CS U.S. Classic							14th			12th			
CS Volvo Cup						8th							
Asian Open					5th								
Autumn Classic							7th						
Bavarian Open											5th		
Cranberry Cup													WD
Golden Spin				3rd	6th								
Ice Star								4th		5th			
Nebelhorn Trophy				11th	12th								
Philadelphia							2nd		8th	6th			
Santa Claus Cup							4th	2nd	5th				
Sofia Trophy								1st					
Sportland Trophy							2nd						
Toruń Cup										2nd	6th		
U.S. Classic				5th									
Volvo Open									2nd		10th		
International: Junior
Junior Worlds	41st		16th	26th									
JGP Germany		27th											
JGP Italy			18th										
National
Brazilian Champs.							1st				1st		
WD = Withdrew; C = Event cancelled
