= Figure skating at the 2014 Winter Olympics – Qualification =

The number of entries for the figure skating events at the Winter Olympics is determined by quotas set by the International Olympic Committee. A total of 148 quota spots were available to athletes to compete in the figure skating events at the 2014 Winter Olympics. There were 30 spots allotted each in men's and women's singles, 20 in pair skating, and 24 in ice dance. Additionally, ten nations qualified for the team event. There is no individual athlete qualification to the Olympics; the choice of whom to send is at the discretion of each country's National Olympic Committee. Each National Olympic Committee could enter up to 18 skaters total, with a maximum of nine men or nine women. Canada and Japan ultimately earned three quota spots each in the men's event; Japan, South Korea, and the United States earned three quota spots each in the women's event; Canada and Russia earned three quota spots each in the pairs' event; and Canada, Russia, and the United States earned three quota spots each in the ice dance event.

== Qualification of nations ==
Countries were able to qualify entries to the 2014 Winter Olympics in two ways. Most spots were allocated based on the results of the 2013 World Figure Skating Championships. There, countries were able to qualify up to three entries in each discipline according to a predetermined system. The results of the 2013 World Championships determined 83 total spots: 24 entries each in men's and women's singles, 16 in pairs, and 19 in ice dance.

The remainder of the spots were filled at the 2013 Nebelhorn Trophy in late September 2013. Countries that had already earned an entry to the Olympics were not allowed to qualify additional entries at this final qualifying competition. However, if a country earned two or three spots at the World Championships, but did not have two or three skaters, respectively, qualify for the free skate, then they were allowed to send a skater who did not reach the free segment at World Championships to the Nebelhorn Trophy to qualify the remaining spot(s). Unlike at the World Championships, where countries could qualify more than one spot depending on the placement of their skater(s), at the Nebelhorn Trophy, countries could earn only one spot per discipline, regardless of ranking.

Initially, a total of six spots per singles event, four spots in pairs, and five in ice dance were available at the Nebelhorn Trophy. According to guidelines established by the International Skating Union (ISU), nations had to select skaters and teams who had achieved a minimum Total Elements Score at an ISU-recognized international competition on or before 29 January 2014.

For the team event, scores from the 2012 World Figure Skating Championships and 2013–14 Grand Prix of Figure Skating season were tabulated to establish the ten top nations. Each nation compiled a score from their top performers in each of the four disciplines. The 2013 Grand Prix of Figure Skating Final was the final event to affect the team event score.

== Qualified nations ==
Number of qualified skaters or teams per nation
Nations	Men's singles	Women's singles	Pairs	Ice dance	Team event	Add.	Skater(s)
Australia	1	1	0	1			4
Austria	1	1	1	0			4
Azerbaijan	0	0	0	1			2
Belgium	1	0	0	0			1
Brazil	0	1	0	0			1
Canada	3	2	3	3	Yes		17
China	1	2	2	1	Yes		9
Czech Republic	2	1	0	0			3
Estonia	1	1	0	0			2
France	2	1	1	2	Yes		9
Georgia	0	1	0	0			1
Germany	1	1	2	2	Yes		10
Great Britain	0	1	1	1	Yes	1 (Note: Matthew Parr of Great Britain competed in the team event, but not the men's individual event.)	6
Israel	1	0	1	0			3
Italy	1	2	2	2	Yes		11
Japan	3	3	1	1	Yes		10
Kazakhstan	2	0	0	0			2
Lithuania	0	0	0	1			2
Norway	0	1	0	0			1
Philippines	1	0	0	0			1
Romania	1	0	0	0			1
Russia	1	2	3	3	Yes		15
Slovakia	0	1	0	0			1
South Korea	0	3	0	0			3
Spain	2	0	0	1			4
Sweden	1	1	0	0			2
Turkey	0	0	0	1			2
Ukraine	1	1	1	1	Yes		6
United States	2	3	2	3	Yes		15
Uzbekistan	1	0	0	0			1
Total: 30 NOCs	30	30	20 teams	24 teams	10 teams	1	149

== Qualification summary ==
=== Men's singles ===
Twenty-four quota spots in the men's event were awarded based on the results at the 2013 World Championships. An additional six quota spots were earned at the 2013 Nebelhorn Trophy. This was the first time that the Philippines had ever qualified for a figure skating event at the Winter Olympics; the Philippine Olympic Committee chose to send Michael Christian Martinez.

Qualifying nations in men's singles
Event	Skaters per NOC	Qualifying NOCs	Total skaters
2013 World Championships	3	Canada; Japan	24
2013 World Championships	2	Kazakhstan; Spain; United States; France; Czech Republic	24
2013 World Championships	1	Germany; China; Uzbekistan; Russia; Sweden; Belgium; Austria; Estonia	24
2013 Nebelhorn Trophy	1	Israel; Romania; Philippines; Australia; Ukraine; Italy	6
Total			**30**

=== Women's singles ===
Twenty-four quota spots in the women's event were awarded based on the results at the 2013 World Championships. An additional six quota spots were earned at the 2013 Nebelhorn Trophy. This was Brazil's first qualification for a figure skating event at the Winter Olympics; the Brazilian Olympic Committee chose to send Isadora Williams.

Qualifying nations in women's singles
Event	Skaters per NOC	Qualifying NOCs	Total skaters
2013 World Championships	3	South Korea; Japan; United States	24
2013 World Championships	2	Italy; China; Canada; Russia	24
2013 World Championships	1	France; Sweden; Ukraine; Estonia; Slovakia; Germany; Great Britain	24
2013 Nebelhorn Trophy	1	Australia; Georgia; Norway; Austria; Czech Republic; Brazil	6
Total			**30**

=== Pairs ===
Sixteen quota spots in the pairs' event were awarded based on results at the 2013 World Championships. An additional four quota spots were earned at the 2013 Nebelhorn Trophy. Estonia had originally qualified one quota spot at the 2013 World Championships; however, they relinquished that spot when Alexandr Zaboev was unable to secure Estonian citizenship. Likewise, France had originally qualified two quota spots. However, when Daria Popova was unable to secure French citizenship, France relinquished one of their spots. Those vacated spots were re-allocated to Japan and Austria.

Qualifying nations in pairs
Event	Teams per NOC	Qualifying NOCs	Total teams
2013 World Championships	3	Russia; Canada	15
2013 World Championships	2	Germany; China; ~~France~~; United States; Italy	15
2013 World Championships	1	France	15
2013 Nebelhorn Trophy	1	Great Britain; Ukraine; ~~Estonia~~; Israel; Japan; Austria	5
Total			**20**

=== Ice dance ===
Nineteen quota spots in the ice dance event were awarded based on results at the 2013 World Championships. An additional five quota spots were earned at the 2013 Nebelhorn Trophy.

Qualifying nations in ice dance
Event	Teams per NOC	Qualifying NOCs	Total teams
2013 World Championships	3	United States; Canada; Russia	19
2013 World Championships	2	Italy; France; Germany	19
2013 World Championships	1	Great Britain; Ukraine; Lithuania; Azerbaijan	19
2013 Nebelhorn Trophy	1	China; Turkey; Australia; Japan; Spain	5
Total			**24**

=== Team event ===
In order for a nation to qualify for the team event, it had to have qualified entrants in at least three of the four disciplines (men's singles, women's singles, pair skating, or ice dance). If there were not ten nations that had qualified entrants in all four disciplines, nations with three entrants could use an additional athlete quota to fill their team. These additional athletes were eligible to compete in the team event, but not in the individual Olympic events.

Qualification for figure skating team event
Pl.	Nation	M	W	P	D	Total
1	Canada	Yes	Yes	Yes	Yes	6053
2	Russia	Yes	Yes	Yes	Yes	5459
3	United States	Yes	Yes	Yes	Yes	5274
4	Japan	Yes	Yes	(Note: Japan did not originally qualify a pairs team for the 2014 Winter Olympics. However, when a quota spot became available, it was re-allocated to Japan.)	Yes	4062
5	Italy	Yes	Yes	Yes	Yes	3707
6	France	Yes	Yes	Yes	Yes	3626
7	China	Yes	Yes	Yes	Yes	3609
8	Germany	Yes	Yes	Yes	Yes	3596
9	Ukraine	Yes	Yes	Yes	Yes	1528
10	Great Britain		Yes	Yes	Yes	1261

=== Top four NOCs on waitlist per discipline ===
If a country rejected a quota spot, then that additional quota became available. A country could be eligible for one quota spot per event in the reallocation process. The following list was compiled after the remaining spots were allocated at the 2013 Nebelhorn Trophy. Countries marked in bold with a ● accepted a reallocated quota.

Quota spot waitlist
Men's singles	Women's singles	Pairs	Ice dance
Poland; Brazil; Denmark; Monaco	Lithuania; Finland; Luxembourg; Mexico	**Japan ●** **Austria ●** North Korea; Belarus	Slovakia; Poland; Georgia; Finland
