= 2012 World Figure Skating Championships =

Annual figure skating competition held in 2012

- Type: ISU Championship
- Date: March 26 – April 1
- Season: 2011–12
- Location: Nice, France
- Venue: Palais des Congrès Acropolis

Champions
- Men's singles: (Canada) Patrick Chan
- Ladies' singles: (Italy) Carolina Kostner
- Pairs: (Germany) Aliona Savchenko / Robin Szolkowy
- Ice dance: (Canada) Tessa Virtue / Scott Moir
- Previous: 2011 World Championships
- Next: 2013 World Championships

The 2012 World Figure Skating Championships was an international figure skating competition in the 2011–12 season. The event determined the World Champions in men's singles, ladies' singles, pair skating, and ice dancing. It was held between March 26 and April 1 in Nice, France.

== Host ==
In November 2009, the International Skating Union named Nice, France as the provisional host. In early 2011, it was announced that Montpellier was also under consideration; however, in May 2011, Nice's Palais des Expositions was confirmed as the event venue. The nearby Jean Bouin Center was the practice rink. The cost was estimated at US$10 million. The competition rink, practice rink, and athletes' accommodation facilities are within 60 yards of each other, with an efficient transportation system also boosting Nice's bid.

The event determined the number of entries a country could send to the 2013 World Championships.

== Qualification ==
The event was open to figure skaters from ISU member nations who reached the age of 15 by July 1, 2011. Based on the results of the 2011 World Championships, each country was allowed between one and three entries per discipline. National associations selected their entries based on their own criteria but those skaters had to achieve a minimum technical elements score (TES) at an international event prior to the World Championships. The minimum TES for each discipline and segment were:

Minimum technical scores (TES)
Discipline	SP / SD	FS / FD
Men	20	35
Ladies	15	25
Pairs	17	30
Ice dancing	17	27

Countries which qualified more than one entry per discipline:

Spots	Men	Ladies	Pairs	Dance
3	Japan	Japan; Russia	Germany; Russia	Canada; Russia; United States
2	Canada; Czech Republic; France; Russia; Spain; United States	Finland; Georgia; Italy; South Korea; United States	Canada; China; Italy; Japan; United States	France; Italy

== Entries ==
Member nations submitted the following entries:

Country	Men	Ladies	Pairs	Ice dancing
Armenia	Slavik Hayrapetyan			
Australia	Brendan Kerry	Chantelle Kerry		Danielle O'Brien / Gregory Merriman
Austria	Viktor Pfeifer	Kerstin Frank	Stina Martini / Severin Kiefer	Barbora Silná / Juri Kurakin
Azerbaijan				Julia Zlobina / Alexei Sitnikov
Belarus	Vitali Luchanok		Lubov Bakirova / Mikalai Kamianchuk	Lesia Valadzenkava / Vitali Vakunov
Belgium	Kevin van der Perren	Isabelle Pieman		
Bosnia and Herzegovina	Damjan Ostojič			
Brazil	Kevin Alves			
Bulgaria	Manol Atanassov	Daniela Stoeva	Elizabeta Makarova / Leri Kenchadze	Alexandra Chistiakova / Dimitar Lichev
Canada	Patrick Chan; Kevin Reynolds	Amelie Lacoste	Jessica Dube / Sebastien Wolfe; Meagan Duhamel / Eric Radford	Tessa Virtue / Scott Moir; Kharis Ralph / Asher Hill; Kaitlyn Weaver / Andrew Poje
China	Song Nan	Zhang Kexin	Pang Qing / Tong Jian; Sui Wenjing / Han Cong	Huang Xintong / Zheng Xun
Chinese Taipei	Jordan Ju	Melinda Wang		
Czech Republic	Michal Březina; Tomáš Verner	Eliška Březinová		Gabriela Kubová / Dmitri Kiselev
Denmark	Justus Strid	Karina Johnson		
Estonia		Jelena Glebova		Irina Shtork / Taavi Rand
Finland	Ari-Pekka Nurmenkari	Alisa Mikonsaari; Juulia Turkkila		Henna Lindholm / Ossi Kanervo
France	Florent Amodio; Brian Joubert	Yrétha Silété	Vanessa James / Morgan Ciprès	Pernelle Carron / Lloyd Jones; Nathalie Péchalat / Fabian Bourzat
Georgia		Elene Gedevanishvili		
Germany	Peter Liebers	Sarah Hecken	Maylin Hausch / Daniel Wende; Aliona Savchenko / Robin Szolkowy; Mari Vartmann / Aaron Van Cleave	Nelli Zhiganshina / Alexander Gazsi
(United Kingdom) Great Britain	Luke Chilcott	Jenna McCorkell	Stacey Kemp / David King	Penny Coomes / Nicholas Buckland
Greece		Georgia Glastris		
Hong Kong	Harry Hau Yin Lee			
Hungary	Márton Markó	Viktória Pavuk		Zsuzsanna Nagy / Máté Fejes
India		Ami Parekh		
Ireland		Clara Peters		
Israel	Alexei Bychenko		Danielle Montalbano / Evgeni Krasnopolski	Ekaterina Bugrov / Vasili Rogov
Italy	Samuel Contesti	Carolina Kostner; Valentina Marchei	Stefania Berton / Ondřej Hotárek; Nicole Della Monica / Matteo Guarise	Lorenza Alessandrini / Simone Vaturi; Anna Cappellini / Luca Lanotte
Japan	Yuzuru Hanyu; Takahiko Kozuka; Daisuke Takahashi	Mao Asada; Kanako Murakami; Akiko Suzuki	Narumi Takahashi / Mervin Tran	Cathy Reed / Chris Reed
Kazakhstan	Denis Ten			Cortney Mansour / Daryn Zhunussov
Latvia		Alina Fjodorova		Ksenia Pecherkina / Aleksandrs Jakushin
Lithuania	Saulius Ambrulevičius	Inga Janulevičiūtė		Isabella Tobias / Deividas Stagniūnas
Luxembourg		Fleur Maxwell		
Mexico		Reyna Hamui		Corenne Bruhns / Ryan Van Natten
Monaco	Kim Lucine			
North Korea			Ri Ji-hyang / Thae Won-hyok	
Norway		Anine Rabe		
Philippines	Christopher Caluza	Zhaira Costiniano		
Poland	Maciej Cieplucha			Alexandra Zvorygina / Maciej Bernadowski
Puerto Rico		Victoria Muniz		
Romania	Zoltán Kelemen	Sabina Măriuţă		
Russia	Artur Gachinski; Sergei Voronov	Polina Korobeynikova; Alena Leonova; Ksenia Makarova	Vera Bazarova / Yuri Larionov; Yuko Kavaguti / Alexander Smirnov; Tatiana Volosozhar / Maxim Trankov	Ekaterina Bobrova / Dmitri Soloviev; Elena Ilinykh / Nikita Katsalapov; Ekaterina Riazanova / Ilia Tkachenko
Serbia		Marina Seeh		
Slovakia	Taras Rajec	Alexandra Kunova		Federica Testa / Lukas Csolley
Slovenia		Dasa Grm		
South Africa		Lejeanne Marais		
South Korea	Kim Min-seok	Kwak Min-jeong; Suhr Chae-yeon		
Spain	Javier Fernández; Javier Raya	Sonia Lafuente		Sara Hurtado / Adrià Díaz
Sweden	Alexander Majorov	Viktoria Helgesson		
Switzerland	Laurent Alvarez	Romy Buhler	Anais Morand / Timothy Leemann	Ramona Elsener / Florian Roost
Thailand		Mimi Tanasorn Chindasook		
Turkey	Ali Demirboga	Sıla Saygı		Alisa Agafonova / Alper Ucar
Ukraine	Dmytro Ihnatenko	Natalia Popova		Siobhan Heekin-Canedy / Dmitri Dun
United States	Jeremy Abbott; Adam Rippon	Alissa Czisny; Ashley Wagner	Caydee Denney / John Coughlin; Mary Beth Marley / Rockne Brubaker	Meryl Davis / Charlie White; Madison Hubbell / Zachary Donohue; Maia Shibutani / Alex Shibutani
Uzbekistan	Misha Ge			Anna Nagornyuk / Viktor Kovalenko

Some skaters were required to compete in a preliminary round, while others received a direct entry into the short program, after which the number of entries was reduced further. If a country had a non-direct entry, its lowest-ranked skater according to the Worlds Standings competed in the preliminary round.

Kiira Korpi was originally nominated to represent Finland, but announced her withdrawal on March 16, 2012 due to lingering foot and hip injuries. Alisa Mikonsaari was chosen to take her place in the competition.

== Schedule ==
Nice time (UTC+02:00):

- Monday, March 26
  - 14:30–16:45 – Preliminary round: Pairs
  - 17:15–21:15 – Preliminary round: Dance
- Tuesday, March 27
  - 10:30–16:00 – Preliminary round: Ladies
  - 17:00–22:15 – Preliminary round: Men
- Wednesday, March 28
  - 13:00–16:20 – Pairs' short
  - 18:40–22:30 – Short dance
- Thursday, March 29
  - 12:30–16:55 – Ladies' short
  - 19:00–22:20 – Free dance
- Friday, March 30
  - 12:30–16:55 – Men's short
  - 19:30–22:25 – Pairs' free
- Saturday, March 31
  - 12:55–17:00 – Men's free
  - 18:30–22:25 – Ladies' free
- Sunday, April 1
  - 14:15–16:45 – Exhibitions

== Overview ==
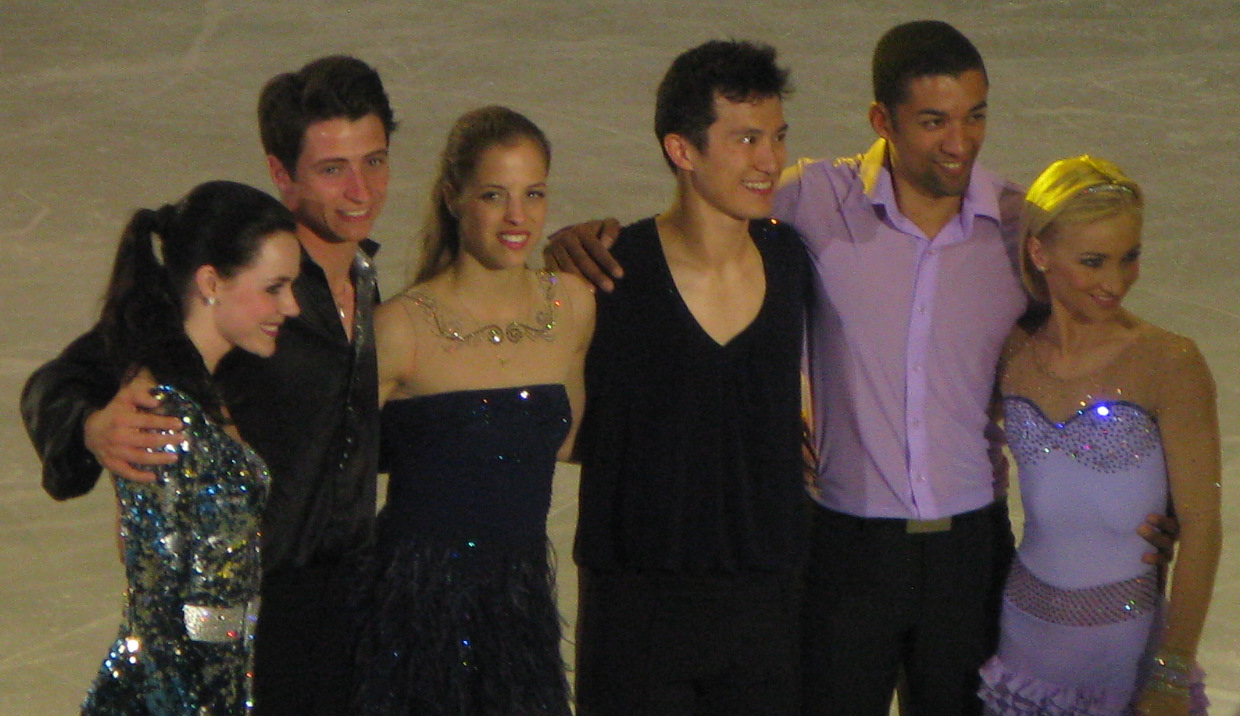
The winners

27 skaters competed in the men's preliminary round and the top twelve – led by Song Nan, Sergei Voronov, and Maciej Cieplucha – advanced to the short program. Patrick Chan, Michal Březina, and Daisuke Takahashi were the top three skaters in the short program.

The men's free skating was held the next evening. Chan won his second World title, Takahashi won silver, and Yuzuru Hanyu won the bronze medal in his senior World debut. Chan was the first men's single skater to win consecutive World titles since Stéphane Lambiel of Switzerland. The event was the first time Japan had two men on the World podium.

33 skaters competed in the ladies' preliminary round and the top twelve – led by Jenna McCorkell, Jelena Glebova, and Sonia Lafuente – advanced to the short program. The top three skaters in the short program were Alena Leonova, Kanako Murakami, and Carolina Kostner.

Kostner was first in the free skating, followed by Akiko Suzuki and Ashley Wagner. Kostner became Italy's first ladies' World champion, silver medalist Leonova was the first Russian to reach the ladies' World podium since 2005, and Suzuki won the bronze. Kostner was the first European lady since 2005 (Irina Slutskaya) to win the gold medal at Worlds. Kostner said: "It is my tenth season at senior level, and in each season I've learned something. Today was my day and my competition. I would have been happy with second place, but I thought ‘keep on dreaming to the end’."

Eleven couples competed in the pairs' preliminary round and the top eight – led by Sui Wenjing / Han Cong, Vanessa James / Morgan Cipres, and Mari Vartmann / Aaron Van Cleave – advanced to the short program. Russian pairs Yuko Kavaguti / Alexander Smirnov and Vera Bazarova / Yuri Larionov collided during their first practice session on March 26 but were not injured.

Aliona Savchenko / Robin Szolkowy took the lead in the short program, followed by Pang Qing / Tong Jian and Narumi Takahashi / Mervin Tran. After falls on previous competition attempts, Savchenko/Szolkowy landed the rare throw triple Axel (first successfully executed in international competition by Rena Inoue / John Baldwin at the 2006 Winter Olympics) for the first time in their career but her free foot touched the ice. Some skaters expressed concerns about the ice quality. Maxim Trankov said: "It is soft in some places, brittle in others. I guess it is ok if you skate right after ice resurfacing, but if you are the last one to skate in the second group, it is quite another story." Alexander Smirnov said: "Sometimes it simply crushes under your blades like glass."

Volosozhar / Trankov placed first in the free skating, Savchenko / Szolkowy were second and Takahashi / Tran were third. Savchenko / Szolkowy won their fourth World title – becoming the fifth pair in the post-World War II period to do so – Volosozhar / Trankov repeated as silver medalists, and Takahashi / Tran won bronze – the first ever World pairs medal for Japan.

23 couples competed in the ice dancing preliminary round and the top ten – led by Elena Ilinykh / Nikita Katsalapov, Huang Xintong / Zheng Xun, and Irina Shtork / Taavi Rand – advanced to the short dance. Viktor Kovalenko – who qualified with his partner Anna Nagornyuk in 9th place – received his visa on the morning of March 26 and arrived at the arena ten minutes before they were due to compete in the preliminary round. Gregory Merriman's blade broke off his heel a minute before the end of the performance but he and his partner, Danielle O'Brien, were also able to qualify.

Tessa Virtue / Scott Moir took the lead in the short dance, followed by Meryl Davis / Charlie White and Nathalie Pechalat / Fabian Bourzat. The top three were the same in the free dance. Virtue / Moir won their second World title, while the 2011 World Champions, Davis / White, took silver, and Pechalat / Bourzat won bronze, their first World medal for overall placement.

== Results ==
=== Men ===
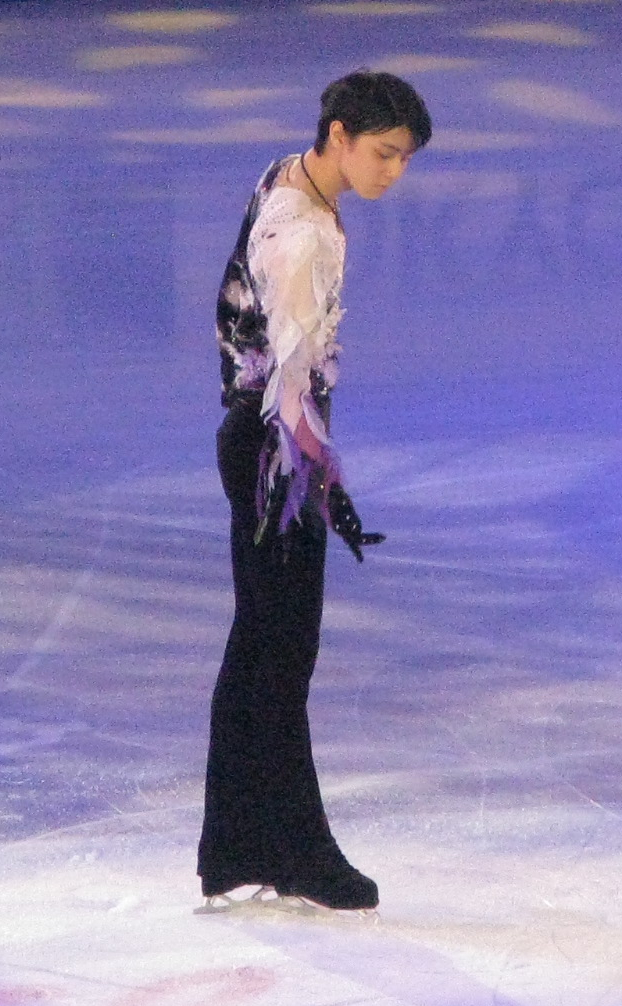
Yuzuru Hanyu at Worlds 2012

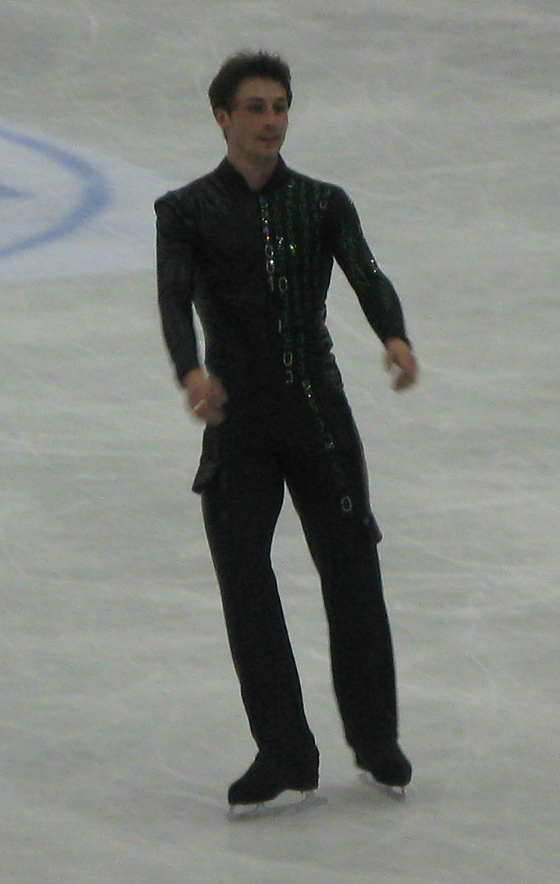
Brian Joubert at Worlds 2012

Rank	Name	Nation	Total points	PR		SP		FS	
1	Patrick Chan	Canada	266.11			1	89.41	1	176.70
2	Daisuke Takahashi	Japan	259.66			3	85.72	3	173.94
3	Yuzuru Hanyu	Japan	251.06			7	77.07	2	173.99
4	Brian Joubert	France	244.58			4	83.47	5	161.11
5	Florent Amodio	France	243.03			6	79.96	4	163.07
6	Michal Březina	Czech Republic	239.55			2	87.67	7	151.88
7	Denis Ten	Kazakhstan	229.70			8	76.00	6	153.70
8	Jeremy Abbott	United States	226.19			9	74.85	8	151.34
9	Javier Fernández	Spain	225.87			5	81.87	14	144.00
10	Samuel Contesti	Italy	224.89			11	73.55	9	151.34
11	Takahiko Kozuka	Japan	218.63			13	71.78	11	146.85
12	Kevin Reynolds	Canada	217.20			12	72.95	13	144.25
13	Adam Rippon	United States	216.63			10	73.55	16	143.08
14	Song Nan	China	216.33	1	130.75	15	69.58	12	146.75
15	Kevin van der Perren	Belgium	214.04			18	66.38	10	147.66
16	Tomáš Verner	Czech Republic	210.66			14	70.38	17	140.28
17	Sergei Voronov	Russia	210.04	2	128.47	17	66.81	15	143.23
18	Artur Gachinski	Russia	205.06			16	68.50	18	136.56
19	Misha Ge	Uzbekistan	186.41	4	124.41	19	65.29	23	121.12
20	Peter Liebers	Germany	184.13			23	58.21	19	125.92
21	Christopher Caluza	Philippines	184.10	8	112.08	20	61.87	20	122.23
22	Viktor Pfeifer	Austria	182.54	6	120.48	21	60.61	21	121.93
23	Kim Lucine	Monaco	181.37	5	122.58	22	59.93	22	121.44
24	Javier Raya	Spain	167.48	9	111.66	24	57.22	24	110.26
Did not advance to free skating
25	Maciej Cieplucha	Poland		3	126.50	25	57.18		
26	Alexander Majorov	Sweden		7	115.78	26	56.57		
27	Kim Min-seok	South Korea		11	110.24	27	55.41		
28	Dmytro Ihnatenko	Ukraine				28	52.93		
29	Alexei Bychenko	Israel		12	108.51	29	52.76		
30	Justus Strid	Denmark		10	110.45	30	50.55		
Did not advance to short program
31	Ari-Pekka Nurmenkari	Finland		13	100.16				
32	Zoltán Kelemen	Romania		14	97.75				
33	Brendan Kerry	Australia		15	95.40				
34	Laurent Alvarez	Switzerland		16	93.24				
35	Damjan Ostojič	Bosnia and Herzegovina		17	93.11				
36	Slavik Hayrapetyan	Armenia		18	92.84				
37	Luke Chilcott	(United Kingdom) Great Britain		19	91.92				
38	Jordan Ju	Chinese Taipei		20	89.56				
39	Márton Markó	Hungary		21	86.08				
40	Ali Demirboga	Turkey		22	84.34				
41	Vitali Luchanok	Belarus		23	83.97				
42	Saulius Ambrulevičius	Lithuania		24	82.40				
43	Taras Rajec	Slovakia		25	81.81				
44	Manol Atanassov	Bulgaria		26	79.14				
45	Harry Hau Yin Lee	Hong Kong		27	66.56				
WD	Kevin Alves	Brazil							

=== Ladies ===
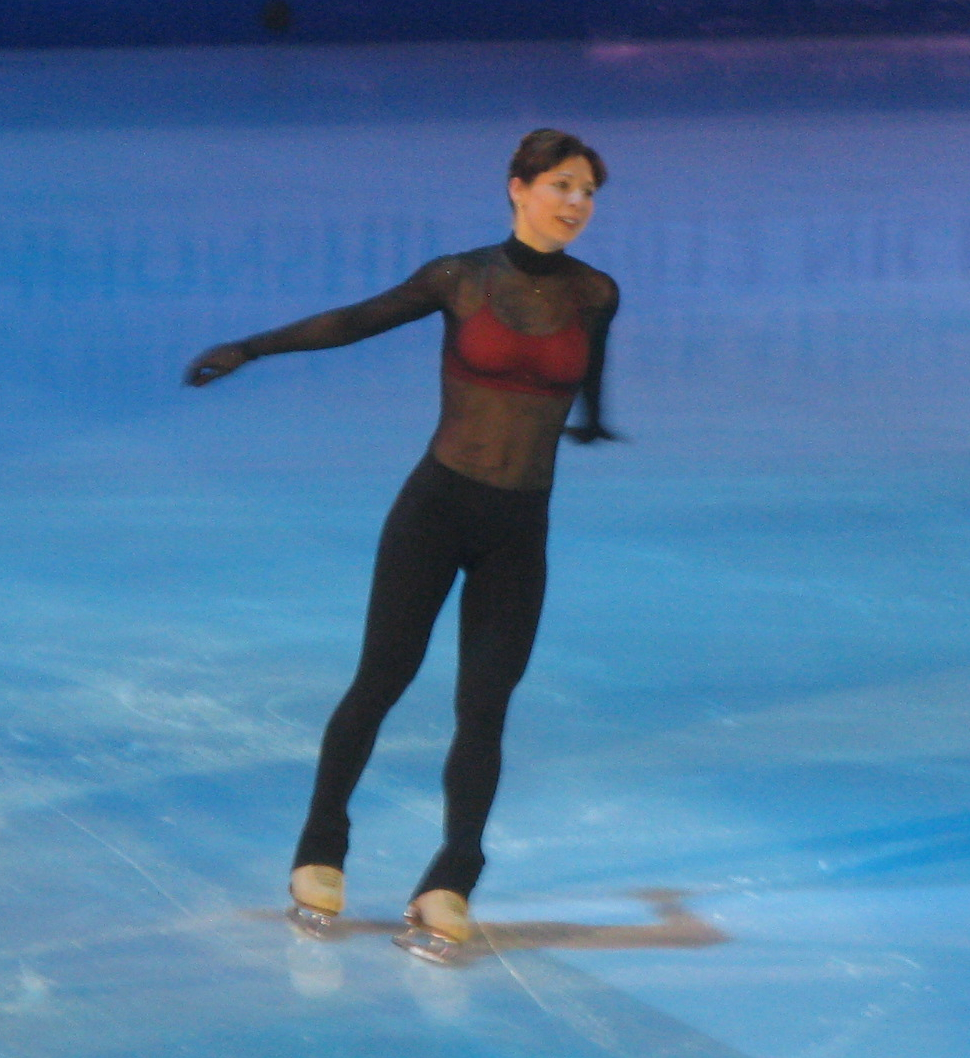
Alena Leonova at WFSC

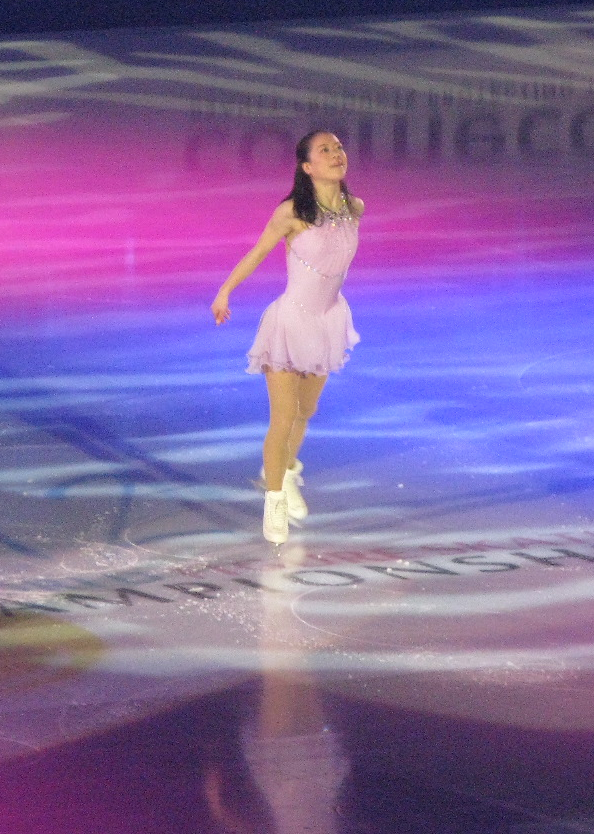
Akiko Suzuki at WFSC

Rank	Name	Nation	Total points	PR		SP		FS	
1	Carolina Kostner	Italy	189.94			3	61.00	1	128.94
2	Alena Leonova	Russia	184.28			1	64.61	4	119.67
3	Akiko Suzuki	Japan	180.68			5	59.38	2	121.30
4	Ashley Wagner	United States	176.77			8	56.42	3	120.35
5	Kanako Murakami	Japan	175.41			2	62.67	5	112.74
6	Mao Asada	Japan	164.52			4	59.49	6	105.03
7	Zhang Kexin	China	157.57			9	55.00	7	102.57
8	Valentina Marchei	Italy	150.10	4	88.92	11	52.14	9	97.96
9	Ksenia Makarova	Russia	149.48			6	58.51	14	90.97
10	Elene Gedevanishvili	Georgia	149.20			7	58.49	15	90.71
11	Viktoria Helgesson	Sweden	148.54			10	54.19	11	94.35
12	Yrétha Silété	France	148.18			15	48.42	8	99.76
13	Jelena Glebova	Estonia	144.28	2	92.52	14	49.04	10	95.24
14	Jenna McCorkell	(United Kingdom) Great Britain	143.84	1	95.63	12	50.42	12	93.42
15	Sonia Lafuente	Spain	140.24	3	91.84	18	47.36	13	92.88
16	Amélie Lacoste	Canada	138.60			13	49.37	17	89.23
17	Natalia Popova	Ukraine	136.36	8	77.57	20	46.60	16	89.76
18	Juulia Turkkila	Finland	135.56			17	47.75	18	87.81
19	Polina Korobeynikova	Russia	129.98	7	81.70	19	46.71	19	83.27
20	Sarah Hecken	Germany	129.20			21	46.39	20	82.81
21	Kerstin Frank	Austria	126.17	5	85.09	22	45.80	21	80.37
22	Alissa Czisny	United States	124.11			16	48.31	22	75.80
23	Romy Bühler	Switzerland	116.21	6	81.74	24	44.02	23	72.19
24	Alisa Mikonsaari	Finland	110.40			23	44.16	24	66.24
Did not advance to free skating
25	Victoria Muniz	Puerto Rico		9	75.06	25	43.27		
26	Isabelle Pieman	Belgium				26	38.45		
27	Alīna Fjodorova	Latvia		10	73.64	27	38.06		
28	Kwak Min-jeong	South Korea				28	36.91		
29	Clara Peters	Ireland		11	73.36	29	34.03		
30	Lejeanne Marais	South Africa		12	70.50	30	32.22		
Did not advance to short program
31	Melinda Wang	Chinese Taipei		13	70.43				
32	Reyna Hamui	Mexico		14	69.84				
33	Sıla Saygı	Turkey		15	68.85				
34	Inga Janulevičiūtė	Lithuania		16	68.51				
35	Karina Johnson	Denmark		17	68.46				
36	Mimi Tanasorn Chindasook	Thailand		18	67.62				
37	Fleur Maxwell	Luxembourg		19	67.44				
38	Suhr Chae-yeon	South Korea		20	67.17				
39	Daša Grm	Slovenia		21	66.45				
40	Chantelle Kerry	Australia		22	65.48				
41	Eliška Březinová	Czech Republic		23	65.47				
42	Anine Rabe	Norway		24	64.92				
43	Sabina Măriuţă	Romania		25	64.52				
44	Alexandra Kunova	Slovakia		26	61.09				
45	Georgia Glastris	Greece		27	60.49				
46	Ami Parekh	India		28	58.06				
47	Zhaira Costiniano	Philippines		29	56.46				
48	Daniela Stoeva	Bulgaria		30	56.38				
49	Marina Seeh	Serbia		31	52.65				
50	Mirna Librić	Croatia		32	52.16				
51	Viktória Pavuk	Hungary		33	51.43				

=== Pairs ===
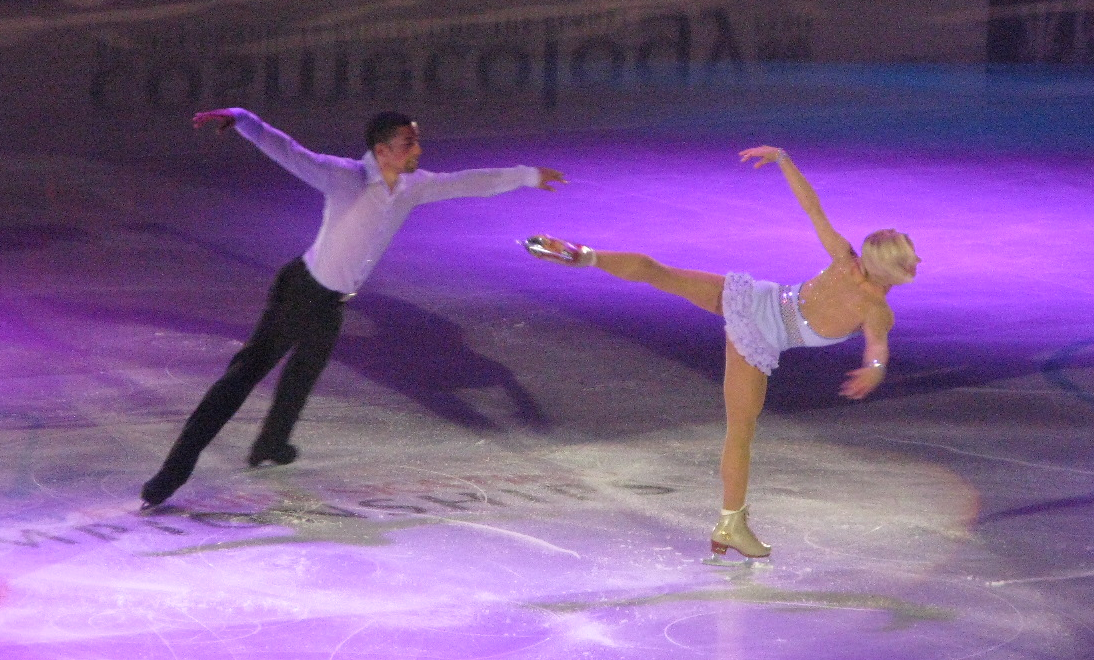
Aliona Savchenko and Robin Szolkowy

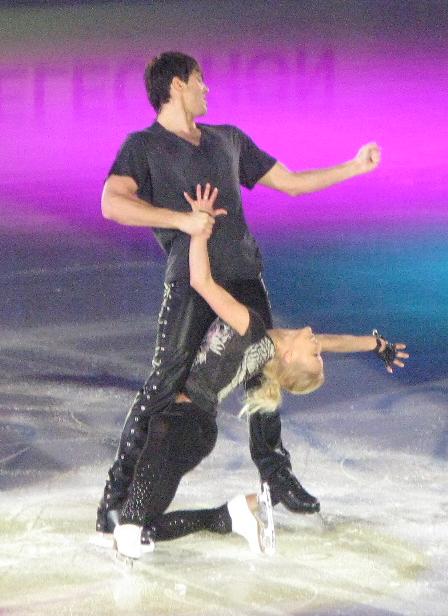
Tatiana Volosozhar and Maxim Trankov

Rank	Name	Nation	Total points	PR		SP		FS	
1	Aliona Savchenko / Robin Szolkowy	Germany	201.49			1	68.63	2	132.86
2	Tatiana Volosozhar / Maxim Trankov	Russia	201.38			8	60.48	1	140.90
3	Narumi Takahashi / Mervin Tran	Japan	189.69			3	65.37	3	124.32
4	Pang Qing / Tong Jian	China	186.05			2	67.10	6	118.95
5	Meagan Duhamel / Eric Radford	Canada	185.41			5	63.69	5	121.72
6	Vera Bazarova / Yuri Larionov	Russia	183.68			4	65.02	7	118.66
7	Yuko Kavaguti / Alexander Smirnov	Russia	182.42			11	59.59	4	122.83
8	Caydee Denney / John Coughlin	United States	180.37			7	62.48	8	117.89
9	Sui Wenjing / Han Cong	China	179.44	1	116.57	6	63.27	9	116.17
10	Mary Beth Marley / Rockne Brubaker	United States	170.90			10	59.62	10	111.28
11	Stefania Berton / Ondřej Hotárek	Italy	168.16			9	60.39	11	107.77
12	Jessica Dubé / Sébastien Wolfe	Canada	156.36			12	55.83	12	100.53
13	Maylin Hausch / Daniel Wende	Germany	145.80			15	48.48	13	97.32
14	Mari Vartmann / Aaron van Cleave	Germany	143.29	3	90.48	16	47.91	14	95.38
15	Nicole Della Monica / Matteo Guarise	Italy	137.31	7	77.40	14	49.07	15	88.24
16	Vanessa James / Morgan Ciprès	France	130.70	2	96.48	13	50.51	16	80.19
Did not advance to free skating
17	Danielle Montalbano / Evgeni Krasnopolski	Israel		5	84.71	17	44.69		
18	Anaïs Morand / Timothy Leemann	Switzerland		8	73.19	18	44.59		
19	Stacey Kemp / David King	(United Kingdom) Great Britain		4	89.30	19	39.33		
20	Ri Ji-hyang / Thae Won-hyok	North Korea		6	84.28	20	36.23		
Did not advance to short program
21	Lubov Bakirova / Mikalai Kamianchuk	Belarus		9	71.58				
22	Stina Martini / Severin Kiefer	Austria		10	64.72				
23	Elizabeta Makarova / Leri Kenchadze	Bulgaria		11	55.13				

=== Ice dancing ===
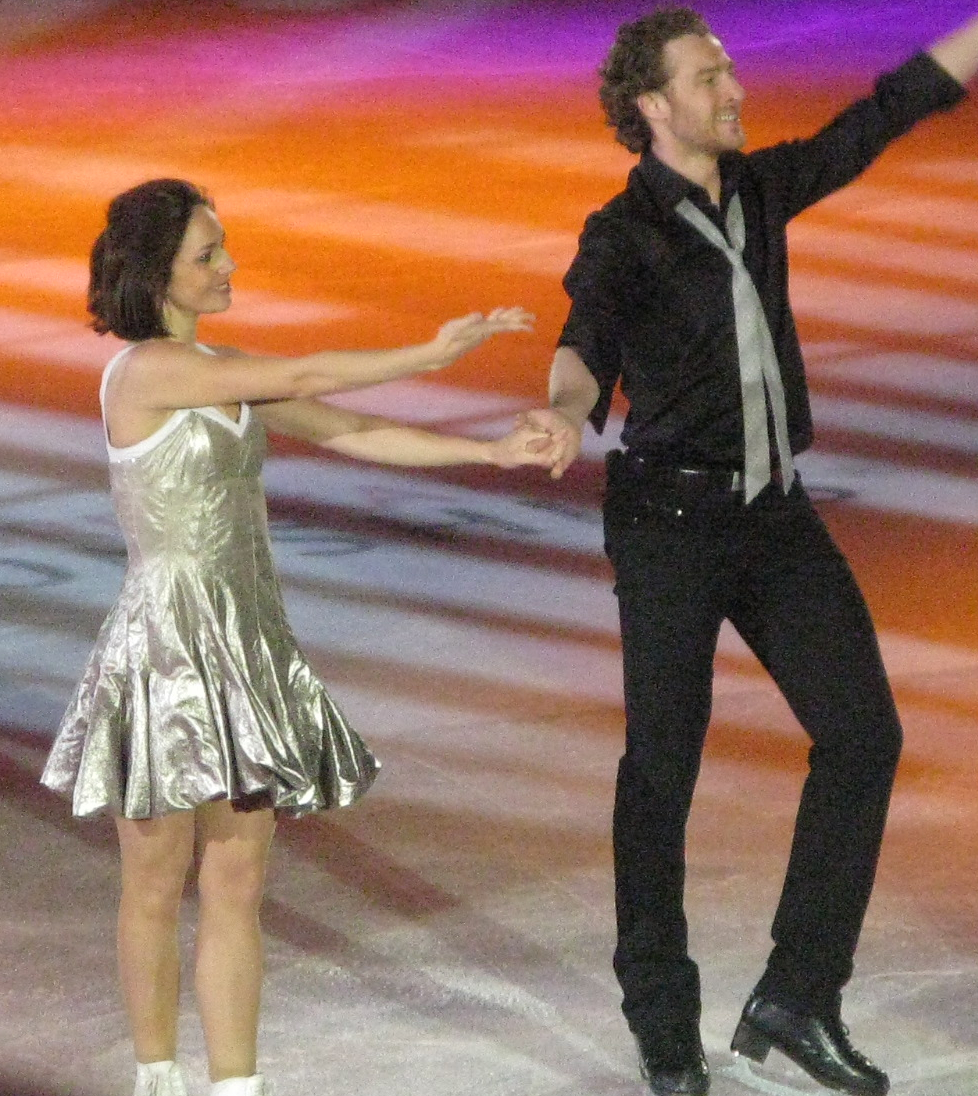
Nathalie Péchalat and Fabian Bourzat

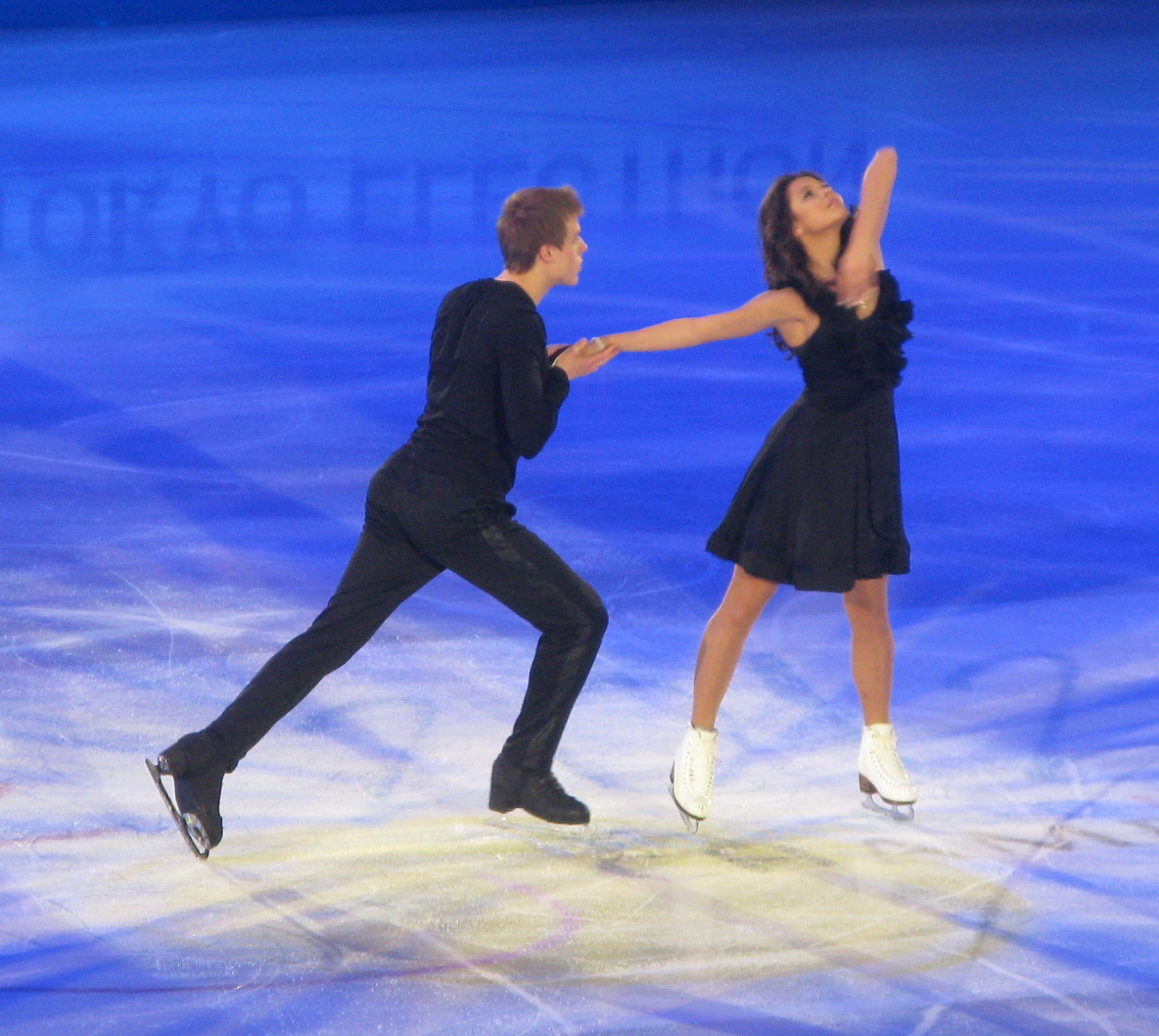
Elena Ilinykh and Nikita Katsalapov

Rank	Name	Nation	Total points	PR		SD		FD	
1	Tessa Virtue / Scott Moir	Canada	182.65			1	72.31	1	110.34
2	Meryl Davis / Charlie White	United States	178.62			2	70.98	2	107.64
3	Nathalie Péchalat / Fabian Bourzat	France	173.18			3	69.13	3	104.05
4	Kaitlyn Weaver / Andrew Poje	Canada	166.65			4	66.47	4	100.18
5	Elena Ilinykh / Nikita Katsalapov	Russia	161.00	1	92.40	5	65.34	5	95.66
6	Anna Cappellini / Luca Lanotte	Italy	160.62			6	65.11	6	95.51
7	Ekaterina Bobrova / Dmitri Soloviev	Russia	150.75			9	58.29	7	92.46
8	Maia Shibutani / Alex Shibutani	United States	144.72			7	62.35	11	82.37
9	Ekaterina Riazanova / Ilia Tkachenko	Russia	144.43			10	58.19	8	86.24
10	Madison Hubbell / Zachary Donohue	United States	143.95			8	59.56	10	84.39
11	Nelli Zhiganshina / Alexander Gazsi	Germany	141.36			11	56.29	9	85.07
12	Huang Xintong / Zheng Xun	China	130.27	2	79.69	13	51.35	13	78.92
13	Kharis Ralph / Asher Hill	Canada	129.55			15	50.75	14	78.80
14	Penny Coomes / Nicholas Buckland	(United Kingdom) Great Britain	129.31	4	79.09	12	54.35	17	74.96
15	Siobhan Heekin-Canedy / Dmitri Dun	Ukraine	128.75			17	48.70	12	80.05
16	Lorenza Alessandrini / Simone Vaturi	Italy	126.89	7	73.96	14	51.18	16	75.71
17	Julia Zlobina / Alexei Sitnikov	Azerbaijan	126.57	5	77.80	19	48.15	15	78.42
18	Isabella Tobias / Deividas Stagniūnas	Lithuania	124.07			16	50.22	19	73.85
19	Sara Hurtado / Adrià Díaz	Spain	123.12	6	76.26	18	48.68	18	74.44
20	Danielle O'Brien / Gregory Merriman	Australia	112.23	8	71.37	20	47.92	20	64.31
Did not advance to free dance
21	Pernelle Carron / Lloyd Jones	France				21	47.75		
22	Irina Shtork / Taavi Rand	Estonia		3	79.17	22	47.24		
23	Zsuzsanna Nagy / Máté Fejes	Hungary		10	70.84	23	45.70		
24	Cathy Reed / Chris Reed	Japan				24	44.19		
25	Anna Nagornyuk / Viktor Kovalenko	Uzbekistan		9	70.88	25	44.08		
Did not advance to short dance
26	Gabriela Kubová / Dmitri Kiselev	Czech Republic		11	70.39				
27	Federica Testa / Lukáš Csölley	Slovakia		12	68.42				
28	Henna Lindholm / Ossi Kanervo	Finland		13	68.42				
29	Alexandra Zvorigina / Maciej Bernadowski	Poland		14	68.29				
30	Ramona Elsener / Florian Roost	Switzerland		15	66.29				
31	Alisa Agafonova / Alper Uçar	Turkey		16	64.61				
32	Ksenia Pecherkina / Aleksandrs Jakushin	Latvia		17	62.15				
33	Corenne Bruhns / Ryan Van Natten	Mexico		18	61.11				
34	Ekaterina Bugrov / Vasili Rogov	Israel		19	60.81				
35	Cortney Mansour / Daryn Zhunussov	Kazakhstan		20	58.92				
36	Barbora Silná / Juri Kurakin	Austria		21	57.78				
37	Alexandra Chistiakova / Dimitar Lichev	Bulgaria		22	55.22				
38	Lesia Valadzenkava / Vitali Vakunov	Belarus		23	53.00				

== Medals summary ==
=== Medalists ===
Medals for overall placement:

Discipline	Gold	Silver	Bronze
Men	(Canada) Patrick Chan	(Japan) Daisuke Takahashi	(Japan) Yuzuru Hanyu
Ladies	(Italy) Carolina Kostner	(Russia) Alena Leonova	(Japan) Akiko Suzuki
Pairs	(Germany) Aliona Savchenko / Robin Szolkowy	(Russia) Tatiana Volosozhar / Maxim Trankov	(Japan) Narumi Takahashi / Mervin Tran
Ice dancing	(Canada) Tessa Virtue / Scott Moir	(United States) Meryl Davis / Charlie White	(France) Nathalie Pechalat / Fabian Bourzat

Small medals for placement in the short segment:

Discipline	Gold	Silver	Bronze
Men	(Canada) Patrick Chan	(Czech Republic) Michal Březina	(Japan) Daisuke Takahashi
Ladies	(Russia) Alena Leonova	(Japan) Kanako Murakami	(Italy) Carolina Kostner
Pairs	(Germany) Aliona Savchenko / Robin Szolkowy	(China) Pang Qing / Tong Jian	(Japan) Narumi Takahashi / Mervin Tran
Ice dancing	(Canada) Tessa Virtue / Scott Moir	(United States) Meryl Davis / Charlie White	(France) Nathalie Pechalat / Fabian Bourzat

Small medals for placement in the free segment:

Discipline	Gold	Silver	Bronze
Men	(Canada) Patrick Chan	(Japan) Yuzuru Hanyu	(Japan) Daisuke Takahashi
Ladies	(Italy) Carolina Kostner	(Japan) Akiko Suzuki	(United States) Ashley Wagner
Pairs	(Russia) Tatiana Volosozhar / Maxim Trankov	(Germany) Aliona Savchenko / Robin Szolkowy	(Japan) Narumi Takahashi / Mervin Tran
Ice dancing	(Canada) Tessa Virtue / Scott Moir	(United States) Meryl Davis / Charlie White	(France) Nathalie Pechalat / Fabian Bourzat

=== Medals by country ===
Table of medals for overall placement:

Rank	Nation	Gold	Silver	Bronze	Total
1	Canada (CAN)	2	0	0	2
2	Germany (GER)	1	0	0	1
2	Italy (ITA)	1	0	0	1
4	Russia (RUS)	0	2	0	2
5	Japan (JPN)	0	1	3	4
6	United States (USA)	0	1	0	1
7	France (FRA)	0	0	1	1
Totals (7 entries)		4	4	4	12
