= 2013 European Figure Skating Championships =

Figure skating competition

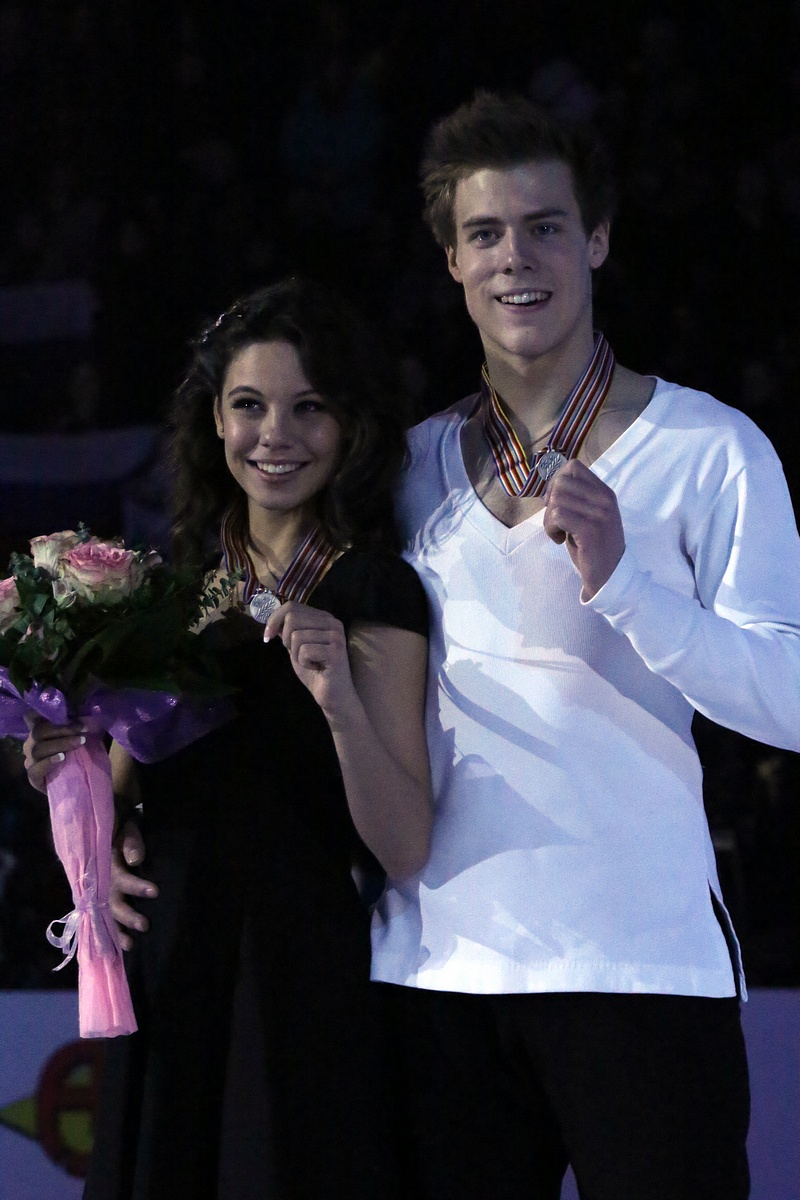
- Elena Ilinykh and Nikita Katsalapov (Overall Ice Dancing Silver Medalist) in the 2013 European Figure Skating Competition.
- Type: ISU Championship
- Date: January 23 – 27
- Season: 2012–13
- Location: Zagreb, Croatia
- Host: Croatia Skating Federation
- Venue: Dom Sportova

Champions
- Men's singles: (Spain) Javier Fernández
- Ladies' singles: (Italy) Carolina Kostner
- Pairs: (Russia) Tatiana Volosozhar / Maxim Trankov
- Ice dance: (Russia) Ekaterina Bobrova / Dmitri Soloviev
- Previous: 2012 European Championships
- Next: 2014 European Championships

The 2013 European Figure Skating Championships was a senior international figure skating competition in the 2012–13 season. The competition was held from 23 to 27 January 2013 at the Dom Sportova in Zagreb, Croatia. Medals were awarded in the disciplines of men's singles, ladies' singles, pair skating, and ice dancing.

== Qualification ==
Skaters were eligible for the event if they were representing a European member nation of the International Skating Union and had reached the age of 15 before July 1, 2012 in their place of birth. The corresponding competition for non-European skaters was the 2013 Four Continents Championships. National associations selected their entries according to their own criteria, Still, the ISU mandated that their selections achieve a minimum technical elements score (TES) at an international event prior to the European Championships.

=== Minimum TES ===
Minimum technical scores (TES)
Discipline	SP / SD	FS / FD
Men	25	45
Ladies	20	36
Pairs	20	36
Ice dance	18	28
Must be achieved at an ISU-recognized international event in the ongoing or preceding season. SP and FS scores may be attained at different events.

=== Number of entries per discipline ===
Based on the results of the 2012 European Championships, the ISU allowed each country one to three entries per discipline.

Spots	Men	Ladies	Pairs	Dance
3	Russia; Czech Republic; France	Italy; Russia	Germany; Russia	Russia; France
2	Spain; Italy; Belgium	Finland; Georgia; Sweden; France	Italy; France (United Kingdom) Great Britain; Belarus	Italy (United Kingdom) Great Britain; Germany; Lithuania; Azerbaijan
If not listed above, one entry was allowed.

== Entries ==
Entries submitted by member states:

Country	Men	Ladies	Pairs	Ice dancing
Austria	Viktor Pfeifer	Kerstin Frank	Stina Martini / Severin Kiefer	Kira Geil / Tobias Eisenbauer
Azerbaijan				Julia Zlobina / Alexei Sitnikov
Belarus	Pavel Ignatenko	Kristina Zakharanka	Maria Paliakova / Nikita Bochkov	Lesia Valadzenkava / Vitali Vakunov
Belgium		Kaat Van Daele		
Bulgaria	Manol Atanassov	Anna Afonkina	Elizabeta Makarova / Leri Kenchadze	Sarah Coward / Georgi Kenchadze
Croatia		Mirna Libric		
Czech Republic	Michal Březina; Pavel Kaška; Tomáš Verner	Eliška Březinová		Lucie Myslivečková / Neil Brown
Denmark	Justus Strid	Anita Madsen		
Estonia	Viktor Romanenkov	Jelena Glebova		Irina Shtork / Taavi Rand
Finland	Valter Virtanen	Alisa Mikonsaari; Juulia Turkkila		Olesia Karmi / Max Lindholm
France	Florent Amodio; Chafik Besseghier; Brian Joubert	Lenaelle Gilleron-Gorry; Mae Berenice Meite	Vanessa James / Morgan Cipres; Daria Popova / Bruno Massot	Pernelle Carron / Lloyd Jones
Georgia		Elene Gedevanishvili		Angelina Telegina / Otar Japaridze
Germany	Peter Liebers	Nathalie Weinzierl	Aliona Savchenko / Robin Szolkowy; Mari Vartmann / Aaron Van Cleave	Tanja Kolbe / Stefano Caruso; Nelli Zhiganshina / Alexander Gazsi
(United Kingdom) Great Britain	Harry Mattick	Jenna McCorkell	Stacey Kemp / David King	Charlotte Aiken / Josh Whidborne; Penny Coomes / Nicholas Buckland
Greece		Isabella Schuster-Velissariou		
Hungary				Zsuzsanna Nagy / Mate Fejes
Israel	Alexei Bychenko			Allison Reed / Vasili Rogov
Italy	Paolo Bacchini; Paul Bonifacio Parkinson	Carolina Kostner; Valentina Marchei; Roberta Rodeghiero	Stefania Berton / Ondrej Hotarek; Nicole Della Monica / Matteo Guarise	Anna Cappellini / Luca Lanotte; Charlene Guignard / Marco Fabbri
Latvia		Alina Fjodorova		
Lithuania	Saulius Ambrulevičius	Inga Janulevičiūtė		
Luxembourg		Fleur Maxwell		
Monaco	Kim Lucine			
Netherlands		Michelle Couwenberg		
Norway		Anne Line Gjersem		
Poland	Maciej Cieplucha		Magdalena Klatka / Radosław Chruściński	Alexandra Zvorigina / Maciej Bernadowski
Romania	Zoltan Kelemen	Sabina Mariuta		
Russia	Maxim Kovtun; Evgeni Plushenko; Sergei Voronov	Nikol Gosviani; Adelina Sotnikova; Elizaveta Tuktamysheva	Yuko Kavaguti / Alexander Smirnov; Ksenia Stolbova / Fedor Klimov; Tatiana Volosozhar / Maxim Trankov	Ekaterina Bobrova / Dmitri Soloviev; Elena Ilinykh / Nikita Katsalapov; Ekaterina Riazanova / Ilia Tkachenko
Slovakia		Monika Simančíková; Nicole Rajicova		Federica Testa / Lukas Csolley
Slovenia		Patricia Glescic		
Spain	Javier Fernandez; Javier Raya	Sonia Lafuente		Sara Hurtado / Adria Diaz
Sweden	Alexander Majorov	Joshi Helgesson; Viktoria Helgesson		
Switzerland	Stephane Walker	Tina Stuerzinger		Ramona Elsener / Florian Roost
Turkey	Ali Demirboga	Sıla Saygı		Alisa Agafonova / Alper Ucar
Ukraine	Yakov Godorozha	Natalia Popova	Julia Lavrentieva / Yuri Rudyk	Siobhan Heekin-Canedy / Dmitri Dun

== Schedule ==
- Wednesday, January 23
  - 11:45–16:00 – Short dance
  - 18:00–18:20 – Opening ceremony
  - 18:45–21:15 – Pairs' short
- Thursday, January 24
  - 11:45–16:10 – Men's short
  - 19:00–22:00 – Pairs' free
- Friday, January 25
  - 10:45–15:55 – Ladies' short
  - 18:30–21:50 – Free dance
- Saturday, January 26
  - 12:45–16:50 – Men's free
  - 18:00–21:55 – Ladies' free
- Sunday, January 27
  - 15:00–17:00 – Exhibitions

== Overview ==
2012 European ladies' silver medalist Kiira Korpi of Finland withdrew due to inflammation of her left Achilles tendon and was replaced by Alisa Mikonsaari. The defending ice dancing champions, France's Nathalie Péchalat / Fabian Bourzat, withdrew due to a partial tear of Bourzat's adductor muscle. France did not have a substitute. The 2012 pair skating silver medalists, Vera Bazarova / Yuri Larionov of Russia, withdrew due to Larionov's wrist injury and Ksenia Stolbova / Fedor Klimov were named as their replacements. Poor weather delayed some arrivals. Germany's Aliona Savchenko / Robin Szolkowy's flight was cancelled twice. A group of Russian skaters flying to Zagreb were stuck in Budapest, Hungary for ten hours due to weather and organizational problems.

France's Florent Amodio was first in the men's short program, one point ahead of Spain's Javier Fernández, while France's Brian Joubert finished third. Seven-time European champion Evgeni Plushenko withdrew after the short program due to aggravation of his back problem. Fernández placed first in the free skate, with Michal Březina of the Czech Republic in second and Amodio in third. Fernández finished first overall and won Spain's first ever European title in figure skating, silver went to Amodio, while Březina claimed the bronze medal and the first European podium of his career.

Russia's Adelina Sotnikova placed first in the ladies' short program, with Italy's Carolina Kostner and Valentina Marchei in second and third respectively. Elizaveta Tuktamysheva of Russia won the free skate ahead of Kostner and Sotnikova. Kostner finished first in the overall standings and won her fifth European title while Sotnikova and Tuktamysheva took their first continental medals, silver and bronze respectively.

Tatiana Volosozhar / Maxim Trankov of Russia won the pairs' short program ahead of Germany's Aliona Savchenko / Robin Szolkowy and Italy's Stefania Berton / Ondrej Hotarek. The top three maintained their respective positions in the free skate. Volosozhar / Trankov repeated as European champions, while Savchenko / Szolkowy took silver and Berton / Hotarek took the bronze, Italy's first European medal in pair skating.

Russia's Ekaterina Bobrova / Dmitri Soloviev placed first in the short dance, with teammates Elena Ilinykh / Nikita Katsalapov and Italy's Anna Cappellini / Luca Lanotte rounding out the top three. Bobrova / Soloviev won their first European title, silver medalists Ilinykh / Katsalapov were first in the free dance by 0.33 and second overall by 0.11, and bronze medalists Cappellini / Lanotte finished on the European podium for the first time in their career.

== Results ==
=== Men ===
Rank	Name	Nation	Total points	SP		FS	
1	Javier Fernández	Spain	274.87	2	88.80	1	186.07
2	Florent Amodio	France	250.53	1	89.82	3	160.71
3	Michal Březina	Czech Republic	243.52	4	79.84	2	163.68
4	Brian Joubert	France	232.47	3	83.93	5	148.54
5	Maxim Kovtun	Russia	226.57	7	74.46	4	152.11
6	Alexander Majorov	Sweden	211.88	8	74.29	6	137.59
7	Sergei Voronov	Russia	210.18	5	78.38	7	131.80
8	Viktor Pfeifer	Austria	194.77	10	67.34	9	127.43
9	Chafik Besseghier	France	189.67	11	66.93	10	122.74
10	Peter Liebers	Germany	187.96	17	56.67	8	131.29
11	Tomáš Verner	Czech Republic	177.41	9	68.99	19	108.42
12	Kim Lucine	Monaco	175.61	12	63.27	16	112.34
13	Pavel Ignatenko	Belarus	171.18	14	58.38	15	112.80
14	Alexei Bychenko	Israel	171.12	18	56.42	12	114.70
15	Yakov Godorozha	Ukraine	170.29	15	57.44	14	112.85
16	Javier Raya	Spain	169.58	19	54.21	11	115.37
17	Viktor Romanenkov	Estonia	167.98	13	59.66	20	108.32
18	Zoltan Kelemen	Romania	167.33	16	57.44	18	109.89
19	Maciej Cieplucha	Poland	167.29	23	52.84	13	114.45
20	Stephane Walker	Switzerland	163.11	24	50.93	17	112.18
21	Justus Strid	Denmark	160.08	22	53.14	21	106.94
22	Manol Atanassov	Bulgaria	133.21	21	53.58	22	79.63
WD	Pavel Kaška	Czech Republic		20	53.76	WD	
Did not advance to free skating
24	Paolo Bacchini	Italy		25	50.68		
25	Valtter Virtanen	Finland		26	48.41		
26	Harry Mattick	(United Kingdom) Great Britain		27	48.08		
27	Saulius Ambrulevičius	Lithuania		28	43.85		
28	Ali Demirboga	Turkey		29	43.47		
29	Paul Bonifacio Parkinson	Italy		30	40.35		
WD	Evgeni Plushenko	Russia		6	74.82		

=== Ladies ===
Rank	Name	Nation	Total points	SP		FS	
1	Carolina Kostner	Italy	194.71	2	64.19	2	130.52
2	Adelina Sotnikova	Russia	193.99	1	67.61	3	126.38
3	Elizaveta Tuktamysheva	Russia	188.85	4	57.18	1	131.67
4	Valentina Marchei	Italy	171.06	3	58.22	4	112.84
5	Viktoria Helgesson	Sweden	155.72	6	54.77	7	100.95
6	Nikol Gosviani	Russia	154.41	12	50.92	5	103.49
7	Sonia Lafuente	Spain	152.29	11	51.07	6	101.22
8	Joshi Helgesson	Sweden	150.40	5	55.04	9	95.36
9	Nathalie Weinzierl	Germany	147.52	8	52.28	10	95.24
10	Maé Bérénice Méité	France	147.14	13	50.79	8	96.35
11	Lénaëlle Gilleron-Gorry	France	143.74	7	53.32	14	90.42
12	Kerstin Frank	Austria	143.56	15	49.60	12	93.96
13	Jelena Glebova	Estonia	143.45	9	51.90	13	91.55
14	Elena Gedevanishvili	Georgia	142.71	16	48.75	11	93.96
15	Monika Simančíková	Slovakia	137.47	14	50.27	15	87.20
16	Anita Madsen	Denmark	133.35	17	47.97	16	85.38
17	Juulia Turkkila	Finland	130.79	10	51.47	21	79.32
18	Kaat Van Daele	Belgium	130.00	18	47.18	18	82.82
19	Natalia Popova	Ukraine	128.54	24	45.60	17	82.94
20	Tina Stuerzinger	Switzerland	128.38	22	45.73	19	82.65
21	Jenna McCorkell	(United Kingdom) Great Britain	126.98	19	47.17	20	79.81
22	Anne Line Gjersem	Norway	124.48	23	45.72	22	78.76
23	Sıla Saygı	Turkey	119.27	21	46.17	23	73.10
24	Fleur Maxwell	Luxembourg	113.01	20	46.66	24	66.35
Did not advance to free skating
25	Anna Afonkina	Bulgaria		25	44.89		
26	Alina Fjodorova	Latvia		26	44.87		
27	Roberta Rodeghiero	Italy		27	44.71		
28	Patricia Gleščič	Slovenia		28	43.36		
29	Alisa Mikonsaari	Finland		29	41.34		
30	Eliška Březinová	Czech Republic		30	40.98		
31	Inga Janulevičiūtė	Lithuania		31	35.53		
32	Michelle Couwenberg	Netherlands		32	35.28		
33	Isabella Schuster-Velissariou	Greece		33	35.09		
34	Sabina Mariuta	Romania		34	33.89		
35	Mirna Libric	Croatia		35	33.73		
36	Kristina Zakharanka	Belarus		36	31.73		

=== Pairs ===
Rank	Name	Nation	Total points	SP		FS	
1	Tatiana Volosozhar / Maxim Trankov	Russia	212.45	1	73.23	1	139.22
2	Aliona Savchenko / Robin Szolkowy	Germany	205.24	2	70.21	2	135.03
3	Stefania Berton / Ondřej Hotárek	Italy	187.45	3	64.28	3	123.17
4	Vanessa James / Morgan Ciprès	France	178.81	4	59.27	4	119.54
5	Yuko Kavaguti / Alexander Smirnov	Russia	175.48	5	56.20	5	119.28
6	Ksenia Stolbova / Fedor Klimov	Russia	167.23	8	53.70	6	113.53
7	Daria Popova / Bruno Massot	France	157.12	7	53.75	7	103.37
8	Mari Vartmann / Aaron Van Cleave	Germany	141.79	6	55.14	10	86.65
9	Nicole Della Monica / Matteo Guarise	Italy	140.89	9	47.26	8	93.63
10	Stacey Kemp / David King	(United Kingdom) Great Britain	131.51	10	45.39	11	86.12
11	Julia Lavrentieva / Yuri Rudyk	Ukraine	128.79	11	41.66	9	87.13
12	Elizaveta Makarova / Leri Kenchadze	Bulgaria	115.96	13	37.15	12	78.81
13	Stina Martini / Severin Kiefer	Austria	112.29	12	39.07	13	73.22
14	Maria Paliakova / Nikita Bochkov	Belarus	103.13	14	37.06	14	66.07
15	Magdalena Klatka / Radosław Chruściński	Poland	99.65	15	34.73	15	64.92

=== Ice dancing ===
Rank	Name	Nation	Total points	SD		FD	
1	Ekaterina Bobrova / Dmitri Soloviev	Russia	169.25	1	69.42	2	99.83
2	Elena Ilinykh / Nikita Katsalapov	Russia	169.14	2	68.98	1	100.16
3	Anna Cappellini / Luca Lanotte	Italy	165.80	3	66.53	3	99.27
4	Ekaterina Riazanova / Ilia Tkachenko	Russia	157.77	4	64.52	4	93.25
5	Penny Coomes / Nicholas Buckland	(United Kingdom) Great Britain	152.95	6	60.59	5	92.39
6	Nelli Zhiganshina / Alexander Gazsi	Germany	147.28	7	60.08	6	87.20
7	Julia Zlobina / Alexei Sitnikov	Azerbaijan	144.83	5	60.93	10	83.90
8	Tanja Kolbe / Stefano Caruso	Germany	142.54	9	56.54	7	86.54
9	Charlene Guignard / Marco Fabbri	Italy	142.48	8	57.63	8	84.85
10	Pernelle Carron / Lloyd Jones	France	140.00	10	55.85	9	84.15
11	Irina Shtork / Taavi Rand	Estonia	132.90	14	50.51	11	82.39
12	Siobhan Heekin-Canedy / Dmitri Dun	Ukraine	129.36	11	53.59	13	75.78
13	Alisa Agafanova / Alper Ucar	Turkey	127.59	12	50.79	12	76.80
14	Lucie Myslivečková / Neil Brown	Czech Republic	124.62	13	50.52	15	74.10
15	Sara Hurtado / Adrià Díaz	Spain	124.26	15	49.32	14	74.97
16	Zsuzsanna Nagy / Mate Fejes	Hungary	117.60	16	48.48	17	69.12
17	Federica Testa / Lukas Csolley	Slovakia	114.62	19	44.83	16	69.79
18	Ramona Elsener / Florian Roost	Switzerland	113.29	17	45.09	18	68.20
19	Olesia Karmi / Max Lindholm	Finland	110.94	20	44.29	19	66.83
20	Angelina Telegina / Otar Japaridze	Georgia	107.26	18	44.94	20	62.32
Did not advance to free dance
21	Alexandra Zvorigina / Maciej Bernadowski	Poland		21	44.25		
22	Charlotte Aiken / Josh Whidborne	(United Kingdom) Great Britain		22	41.83		
23	Kira Geil / Tobias Eisenbauer	Austria		23	40.88		
24	Lesia Valadzenkava / Vitali Vakunov	Belarus		24	36.60		
25	Sarah Coward / Georgi Kenchadze	Bulgaria		25	34.16		
WD	Allison Reed / Vasili Rogov	Israel					

== Medals summary ==
=== Medals by country ===
Table of medals for overall placement:

Rank	Nation	Gold	Silver	Bronze	Total
1	Russia (RUS)	2	2	1	5
2	Italy (ITA)	1	0	2	3
3	Spain (ESP)	1	0	0	1
4	France (FRA)	0	1	0	1
4	Germany (GER)	0	1	0	1
6	Czech Republic (CZE)	0	0	1	1
Totals (6 entries)		4	4	4	12

Table of small medals for placement in the short segment:

Rank	Nation	Gold	Silver	Bronze	Total
1	Russia (RUS)	3	1	0	4
2	France (FRA)	1	0	1	2
3	Italy (ITA)	0	1	3	4
4	Germany (GER)	0	1	0	1
4	Spain (ESP)	0	1	0	1
Totals (5 entries)		4	4	4	12

Table of small medals for placement in the free segment:

Rank	Nation	Gold	Silver	Bronze	Total
1	Russia (RUS)	3	1	1	5
2	Spain (ESP)	1	0	0	1
3	Italy (ITA)	0	1	2	3
4	Czech Republic (CZE)	0	1	0	1
4	Germany (GER)	0	1	0	1
6	France (FRA)	0	0	1	1
Totals (6 entries)		4	4	4	12

=== Medalists ===
Medals for overall placement:

Discipline	Gold	Silver	Bronze
Men	(Spain) Javier Fernández	(France) Florent Amodio	(Czech Republic) Michal Březina
Ladies	(Italy) Carolina Kostner	(Russia) Adelina Sotnikova	(Russia) Elizaveta Tuktamysheva
Pair skating	(Russia) Tatiana Volosozhar / Maxim Trankov	(Germany) Aliona Savchenko / Robin Szolkowy	(Italy) Stefania Berton / Ondrej Hotarek
Ice dancing	(Russia) Ekaterina Bobrova / Dmitri Soloviev	(Russia) Elena Ilinykh / Nikita Katsalapov	(Italy) Anna Cappellini / Luca Lanotte

Small medals for placement in the short segment:

Discipline	Gold	Silver	Bronze
Men	(France) Florent Amodio	(Spain) Javier Fernández	(France) Brian Joubert
Ladies	(Russia) Adelina Sotnikova	(Italy) Carolina Kostner	(Italy) Valentina Marchei
Pair skating	(Russia) Tatiana Volosozhar / Maxim Trankov	(Germany) Aliona Savchenko / Robin Szolkowy	(Italy) Stefania Berton / Ondrej Hotarek
Ice dancing	(Russia) Ekaterina Bobrova / Dmitri Soloviev	(Russia) Elena Ilinykh / Nikita Katsalapov	(Italy) Anna Cappellini / Luca Lanotte

Small medals for placement in the free segment:

Discipline	Gold	Silver	Bronze
Men	(Spain) Javier Fernández	(Czech Republic) Michal Březina	(France) Florent Amodio
Ladies	(Russia) Elizaveta Tuktamysheva	(Italy) Carolina Kostner	(Russia) Adelina Sotnikova
Pair skating	(Russia) Tatiana Volosozhar / Maxim Trankov	(Germany) Aliona Savchenko / Robin Szolkowy	(Italy) Stefania Berton / Ondrej Hotarek
Ice dancing	(Russia) Elena Ilinykh / Nikita Katsalapov	(Russia) Ekaterina Bobrova / Dmitri Soloviev	(Italy) Anna Cappellini / Luca Lanotte
