= Alexandra Zvorigina =

Russian-Polish ice dancer (born 1991)

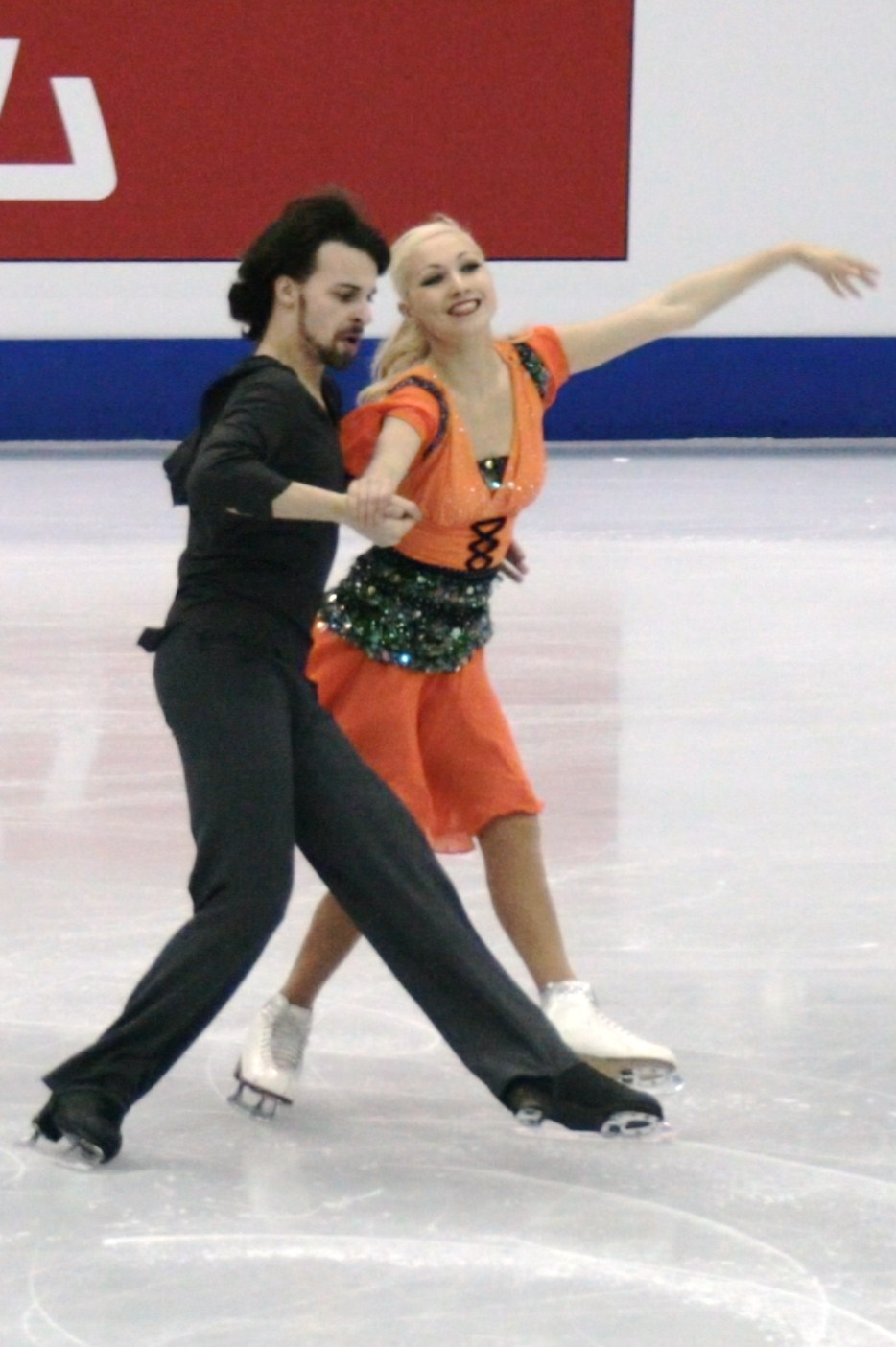

Personal information
- Full name: Alexandra Zvorigina
- Born: January 7, 1991 (age 35) Glazov, Russia
- Home town: Łódź, Poland
- Height: 1.65 m (5 ft 5 in)

Figure skating career
- Country: Poland
- Partner: Maciej Bernadowski
- Coach: Bożena Bernadowska
- Skating club: Lodz Figure Skating Association
- Began skating: 1996
- Retired: 2013

Alexandra Zvorigina (Russian: Александра Зворыгина, born January 7, 1991) is a Russian-born former competitive ice dancer who competed for Poland with partner Maciej Bernadowski. Together, they are three-time (2011–2013) Polish national champions.

== Programs ==
(with Bernadowski)

Season	Short dance	Free dance
2012–2013	Gaite Parisienne by Jacques Offenbach; Kaiser-Walzer by Johann Strauss II	Fiddler on the Roof by Jerry Bock
2011–2012	Love of My Life; Black Machine; by Carlos Santana	Le Temps de cathédrales; Tentative d'enlevement; Danse mon Esmeralda; performed by Garou (from Notre Dame de Paris) by Riccardo Cocciante & Luc Plamondon

== Competitive highlights ==
=== With Bernadowski ===
Competition placements at senior level
Season	2010–11	2011–12	2012–13
World Championships		26th	
European Championships		21st	21st
Nepela Memorial		9th	10th
NRW Trophy		11th	
Cup of Nice		9th	9th
Polish Championships	1st	1st	1st
Three Nationals	3rd	1st	2nd

== Detailed results ==
- Results of qualification rounds are listed in brackets below the results of the main event in the respective competition segment.

Results in the 2012–13 season
Date	Event	SP		FS		Total	
Date	Event	P	Score	P	Score	P	Score
Oct 5–7, 2012	(Slovakia) 2012 Ondrej Nepela Memorial	10	39.24	10	52.80	10	92.04
Oct 24–28, 2012	(France) 2012 Cup of Nice	7	44.70	9	63.50	9	108.20
Dec 14–16, 2012	(Poland) 2013 Three Nationals	3	49.32	2	72.41	2	121.73
Jan 23–27, 2013	(Croatia) 2013 European Championships	21	44.25	–	–	21	44.25

Results in the 2011–12 season
Date	Event	SP		FS		Total	
Date	Event	P	Score	P	Score	P	Score
Sep 28–Oct 2, 2011	(Slovakia) 2011 Ondrej Nepela Memorial	8	40.31	9	56.93	9	97.24
Oct 26–30, 2011	(France) 2011 Cup of Nice	5	41.36	11	56.31	9	97.67
Dec 16–17, 2011	(Poland) 2012 Three Nationals	1	50.06	2	71.85	1	121.91
Jan 23–29, 2012	(United Kingdom) 2012 European Championships	–	–	(15)	(58.94)	21	DNQ
Mar 26–Apr 1, 2012	(France) 2012 World Championships	–	–	(14)	(58.94)	26	DNQ

Results in the 2010–11 season
Date	Event	SP		FS		Total	
Date	Event	P	Score	P	Score	P	Score
Dec 16–18, 2010	(Slovakia) 2011 Three Nationals	3	47.02	3	67.64	3	114.66
