= Alisa Mikonsaari =

Finnish figure skater (born 1993)

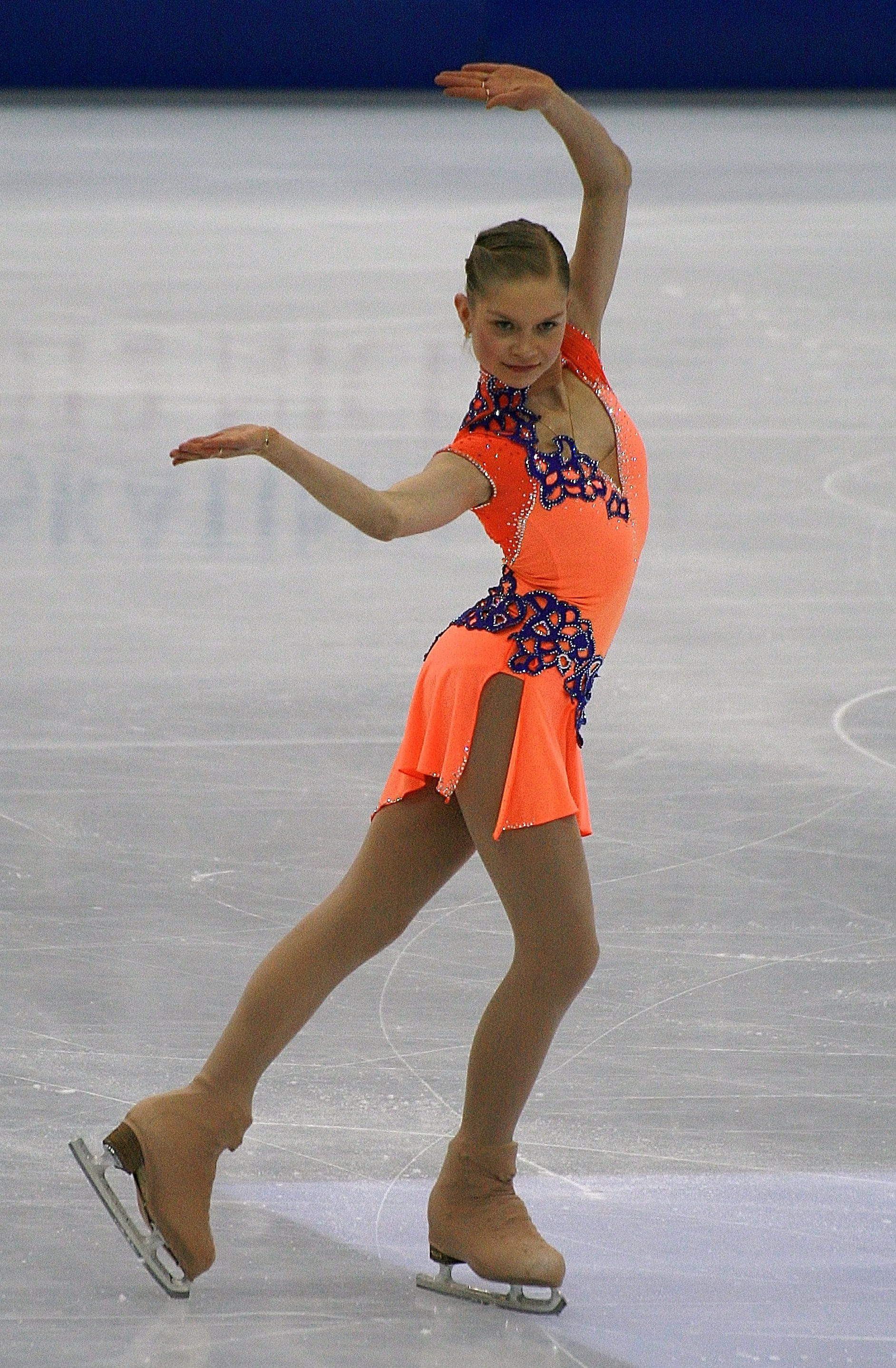
- Mikonsaari in 2012

Personal information
- Born: 19 June 1993 (age 33) Lappeenranta, Finland
- Home town: Lappeenranta, Finland
- Height: 1.60 m (5 ft 3 in)

Figure skating career
- Country: Finland
- Skating club: Lappeenrannan Taitoluistelijat
- Began skating: 1999

Alisa Mikonsaari (born 19 June 1993) is a Finnish figure skating coach and retired figure skater. She is the 2013 Finnish national bronze medalist and 2011 Finlandia Trophy bronze medalist.

== Personal life ==
Mikonsaari was born on 19 June 1993, in Lappeenranta, Finland. Her mother is Russian and her father Finnish.

== Competitive career ==
Mikonsaari replaced the injured Kiira Korpi in the Finnish team to the 2012 World Championships two weeks prior to the event.

She was also named as Korpi's replacement at the 2013 European Championships, where she finished in twenty-ninth place. Following that season, she retired from competitive figure skating due to a nagging hip injury.

== Coaching career ==
Following her competitive figure skating career, Minkonsaari began working as a coach after being invited by former coach, Angelina Turenko, to coach in Saint Petersburg, Russia. She briefly moved back to Finland following the outbreak of the COVID-19 pandemic before moving to Egna, Italy to coach at the Young Goose Academy in 2021.

In the summer of 2023, Mikonsaari relocated to Assago to coach at the IceLab Skating Club.

Her current students include:

- (Croatia) Jari Kessler
- (Hungary) Júlia Láng
- (Italy) Matteo Nalbone
- (Poland) Oscar Oliver
- (Italy) Anna Pezzetta
- (Poland) Vladimir Samoilov
- (Lithuania) Milana Siniavskyte

Her former students include:

- (Italy) Daniel Grassl
- (Italy) Gabriele Frangipani
- (Spain) Tomàs-Llorenç Guarino Sabaté
- (Czech Republic) Barbora Vrankova
- (Switzerland) Naoki Rossi
- (Austria) Tobia Oellerer

== Programs ==
Season	Short program	Free skating
2012–2013	Lord of the Dance by Ronan Hardiman	Sheherazade by Nikolai Rimsky-Korsakov
2011–2012	Variation of a Magnolia by Karen Khachaturian	Sheherazade by Nikolai Rimsky-Korsakov
2008–2009	Orpheus and Euridice by Christoph Willibald Gluck	Violin Concerto in E-moll Op. 64 by Felix Mendelssohn

== Competitive highlights ==
Results
International
Event	2007–08	2008–09	2009–10	2010–11	2011–12	2012–13
Worlds					24th	
Europeans						29th
Finlandia				10th	3rd	10th
NRW Trophy				11th	12th	17th
Nordics	2nd J.	9th J.	7th	8th	5th J.	
International: Junior
JGP Croatia		14th				
JGP Italy		11th				
JGP Spain		11th				
EYOF		6th J.				
National
Finnish Champ.	1st J.	1st J.	4th	4th	6th	3rd
J. = Junior level; JGP = Junior Grand Prix
