= Anna Cappellini =

Italian ice dancer (born 1987)

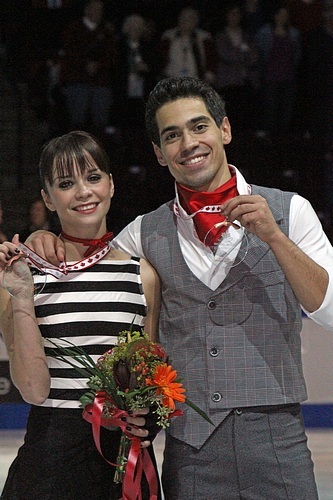
- Cappellini and Lanotte in 2011.

Personal information
- Born: 19 February 1987 (age 39) Como, Italy
- Home town: Como, Italy
- Height: 1.65 m (5 ft 5 in)

Figure skating career
- Country: Italy
- Partner: Luca Lanotte
- Coach: Paola Mezzadri, Marina Zueva, Valter Rizzo
- Skating club: Fiamme Azzurre
- Began skating: 1990

Medal record
Event	Gold medal – first place	Silver medal – second place	Bronze medal – third place
World Championships	1	0	0
European Championships	1	3	1
Grand Prix Final	0	0	1
Italian Championships	7	4	0
Junior Grand Prix Final	0	0	2
Medal list
World Championships
Gold medal – first place	2014 Saitama	Ice dance
European Championships
Gold medal – first place	2014 Budapest	Ice dance
Silver medal – second place	2015 Stockholm	Ice dance
Silver medal – second place	2016 Bratislava	Ice dance
Silver medal – second place	2017 Ostrava	Ice dance
Bronze medal – third place	2013 Zagreb	Ice dance
Grand Prix Final
Bronze medal – third place	2015–16 Barcelona	Ice dance
Italian Championships
Gold medal – first place	2012 Courmayeur	Ice dance
Gold medal – first place	2013 Milan	Ice dance
Gold medal – first place	2014 Merano	Ice dance
Gold medal – first place	2015 Turin	Ice dance
Gold medal – first place	2016 Turin	Ice dance
Gold medal – first place	2017 Egna	Ice dance
Gold medal – first place	2018 Milan	Ice dance
Silver medal – second place	2007 Trento	Ice dance
Silver medal – second place	2008 Milan	Ice dance
Silver medal – second place	2009 Pinerolo	Ice dance
Silver medal – second place	2010 Brescia	Ice dance
Junior Grand Prix Final
Bronze medal – third place	2004–05 Helsinki	Ice dance
Bronze medal – third place	2005–06 Ostrava	Ice dance

Anna Cappellini (born 19 February 1987) is an Italian ice dancer. With partner Luca Lanotte, she is the 2014 World champion, the 2014 European champion, the 2015 Cup of China champion and a thirteen-time medalist on the Grand Prix series, and a seven-time Italian national champion (2012–18).

== Personal life ==
Cappellini was born 19 February 1987 in Como, Italy. She is a member of the Polizia Penitenziaria's sports group, the Fiamme Azzurre. She has expressed interest in studying physiotherapy after her skating career is over.

In August 2014, it was announced that she was engaged to pair skater Ondřej Hotárek. The couple married on June 20, 2015, in Como, Italy. Their daughter Diana was born on July 2, 2021.

== Early career ==
Cappellini started skating at the age of three and switched to ice dance when she was 11 or 12. She skated with Federico Bassi, Luca Lombardi, and Matteo Zanni. She and Zanni placed fifth at the 2004 World Junior Championships. The next season, they won the bronze medal at the Junior Grand Prix Final but had to withdraw from the 2005 Junior Worlds after the original dance due to Zanni's food poisoning. Their partnership ended after his father was severely injured in a car accident and he decided to stop competing.

== Partnership with Lanotte ==
=== 2005–06 to 2008–09 ===
Cappellini was partnered with Lanotte in May 2005 by the Italian skating federation. Following a strong season together on the junior circuit, Cappellini/Lanotte made their senior debut in 2006–07. They finished 8th at their first Europeans. Before their next event, Worlds, Cappellini suffered a torn labrum in her left shoulder. In the free dance at Worlds, they fell during a lift and finished 13th.

In 2007–08, Cappellini/Lanotte won their first Grand Prix medal, a silver at Skate Canada, moved up to seventh at Europeans, and finished in the top ten at Worlds.

In 2008–09, Cappellini/Lanotte did not medal in either of their Grand Prix appearances, but moved up to 5th at Europeans and were again tenth at Worlds. In the off-season, they decided to change coaches, and moved to Lyon, France, to train with Muriel Boucher-Zazoui and Romain Haguenauer.

=== 2009–10 season ===
Cappellini/Lanotte had a strong start in 2009–10, winning silver medals at the Cup of Russia and Skate America and qualifying for their first Grand Prix Final, where they finished fifth. They then placed sixth at the European Championships, and finished outside the top ten at their first Olympics. They then finished 11th at the 2010 World Championships; in the free dance, the two collided during the twizzle sequence, causing Cappellini to fall, and received low levels on several elements.

=== 2010–11 ===
Cappellini/Lanotte began the 2010–11 season at the Nebelhorn Trophy. They were first in the short dance and fourth in the free dance, finishing in second place overall. They then placed fifth at the 2010 NHK Trophy, after which they decided to leave coach Muriel Zazoui and move back to Milan to train with Paola Mezzadri. They withdrew from 2010 Skate America in order to prepare a new free dance. Cappellini/Lanotte later missed Italian nationals and the European Championships because Lanotte had a knee injury. In 2011, they began splitting their time between Milan and Nikolai Morozov in Novogorsk, Russia. They returned to competition at the Mont Blanc Trophy, which they won. They finished 8th at the 2011 World Championships.

=== 2011–12 ===
Cappellini/Lanotte won bronze medals at 2011 Skate Canada International and the 2011 Trophee Eric Bompard. After winning their first national title, they came in sixth at the 2012 World Championships.

=== 2012–13 ===
In June 2012, Cappellini/Lanotte began training with Igor Shpilband in Novi, Michigan. Paola Mezzadri in Milan remained their primary coach, while Novi became their second training base. Cappellini sprained her left shoulder during the summer. In July, they decided to change their planned free dance.

Cappellini/Lanotte began the 2012–13 season with silver at the 2012 Finlandia Trophy. Winning silver at both of their Grand Prix events, the 2012 Skate Canada and the 2012 Trophée Eric Bompard, they qualified for their second Grand Prix Final, where they came in fourth. Cappellini/Lanotte won their first European medal, bronze, at the 2013 European Championships. They then placed fourth at the 2013 World Championships in London, Ontario.

=== 2013–14 season ===
In the 2013–14 season, Cappellini/Lanotte were awarded another pair of silver medals on the Grand Prix series. They placed sixth at the Grand Prix Final before winning gold at the 2014 European Championships in Budapest. The duo finished sixth at the 2014 Winter Olympics in Sochi. Cappellini/Lanotte ended their season at the 2014 World Championships in Saitama, Japan. Ranked first in the short dance and fourth in the free dance, they ended the competition in first overall, 0.02 of a point ahead of Canada's Kaitlyn Weaver / Andrew Poje and 0.06 ahead of France's Nathalie Pechalat / Fabian Bourzat. They became the second Italian ice dancers to win the World title.

=== 2014–15 season ===
In July 2014, Cappellini/Lanotte began working with Marina Zueva in Canton, Michigan, in addition to Mezzadri in Milan. For the 2014-15 Grand Prix season, they were assigned to Cup of China and Trophée Éric Bompard. They withdrew from Trophée Bompard to make changes to their programs. The team took silver at the 2015 European Championships in Stockholm, behind France's Gabriella Papadakis / Guillaume Cizeron. They capped off their season with a fourth-place finish at the 2015 World Championships in Shanghai.

=== 2015–16 season ===
Cappellini/Lanotte began the 2015–16 season by winning the Lombardia Trophy. They won their first Grand Prix gold at the 2015 Cup of China, followed by a silver at 2015 Rostelecom Cup. They qualified for the Grand Prix Final where they won the bronze medal behind Americans Madison Chock/Evan Bates.

Cappellini/Lanotte won silver at the 2016 European Championships in Bratislava, Slovakia, finishing second to Papadakis/Cizeron. At the 2016 World Championships in Boston, they placed sixth in the short dance, fourth in the free, and fourth overall.

=== 2016-17 season ===
Cappellini/Lanotte began their 2016–17 season by winning the CS Nebelhorn Trophy. Their Grand Prix assignments were Skate Canada and the NHK Trophy. They finished fourth at Skate Canada and won the bronze medal at NHK behind Papadakis/Cizeron.

Cappellini/Lanotte won the silver medal at the 2017 European Championships behind Papadakis/Cizeron. They went on to win the Bavarian Open before finishing sixth at the 2017 World Championships to finish their season.

=== 2017-18 season ===
To begin their 2017–18 season, Cappellini/Lanotte won gold at the 2017 CS Minsk-Arena Ice Star. For their Grand Prix series, they were assigned the NHK Trophy and Skate America. Cappellini/Lanotte won bronze at NHK behind Americans Madison Hubbell / Zachary Donahue. They went on to win silver at Skate America behind Americans Maia Shibutani / Alex Shibutani. They qualified for the Grand Prix Final where they finished in sixth place.

At the 2018 European Championships, Cappellini/Lanotte finished fourth overall after winning bronze in the short dance and placing fifth in the free dance.

At the 2018 Winter Olympics, Cappellini/Lanotte competed in the team event where Team Italy finished fourth behind Team USA. In the individual event, Cappellini/Lanotte placed fifth in the short dance and sixth in the free dance to give them a sixth-place finish overall.

Cappellini/Lanotte closed their season with a fourth-place finish at the 2018 World Championships.

=== Post-competitive career ===
Following her competitive career, Cappellini began working as a figure skating choreographer. She has choreographed programs for:

- (Italy) Rebecca Ghilardi/Filippo Ambrosini
- (Germany) Annika Hocke/Robert Kunkel
- (Russia) Elizaveta Tuktamysheva
- (Italy) Anna Valesi/Manuel Piazza
- (Czech Republic) Eliska Zakova/Filip Mencl

== Programs ==
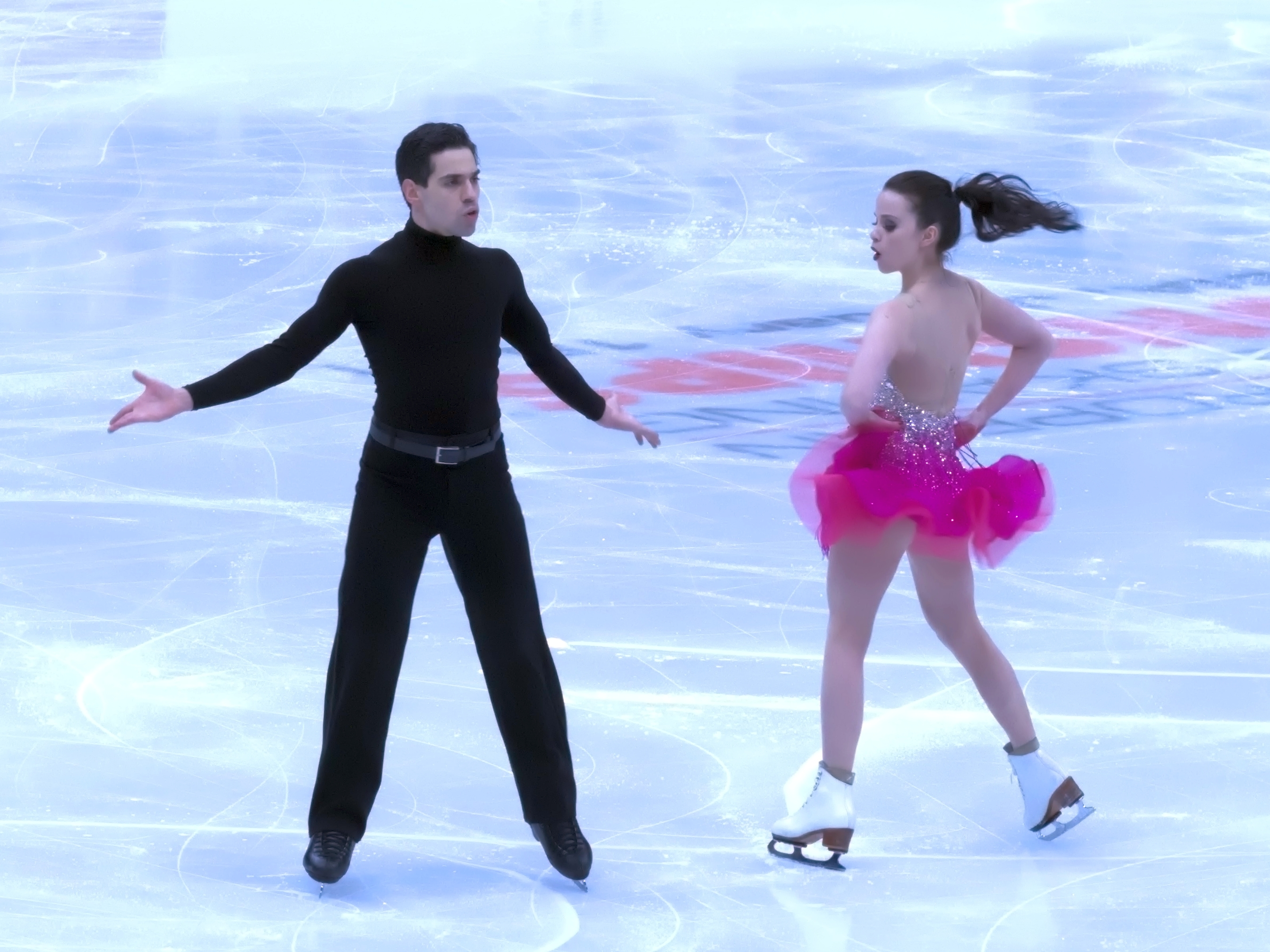
Cappellini/Lanotte at the 2018 Euros

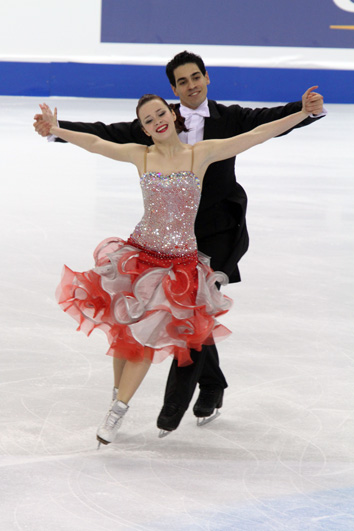
Cappellini/Lanotte at the 2010 Worlds

=== With Lanotte ===
Season	Short dance	Free dance	Exhibition
2017–2018	Cha Cha: Kaboom performed by Ursula 1000; Samba: Skip to the Bip performed by Club des Belugas; Samba: 1008 Samba	La Vita è Bella (soundtrack) by Nicola Piovani	Charlie Chaplin medley: The Kid; Modern Times; City Lights
2016–2017	Blues: Cry For Me; Boogie Woogie: Choo Choo Boogie	Charlie Chaplin medley: Limelight; City Lights: Overture	Charlie Chaplin medley: The Kid; Modern Times; City Lights; La cumparsita – Tango Lesson
2015–2016	Waltz and Polka: The Merry Widow by Franz Lehár	Fellini medley: Nights of Cabiria; Amarcord; 8½ by Nino Rota	La cumparsita – Tango Lesson; Dance of the Hours (from La Gioconda) by Amilcare Ponchielli
2014–2015	Paso Doble: Capriccio Espagnol by Nikolai Rimsky-Korsakov	Danse macabre by Camille Saint-Saëns	When I Was Your Girl performed by Che'Nelle; Dance of the Hours (from La Gioconda) by Amilcare Ponchielli; Fireflies by Leona Lewis
2013–2014	Quickstep: 42nd Street; Foxtrot: Lullaby of Broadway; Quickstep: 42nd Street	Overture from The Barber of Seville by Gioachino Rossini	Pata Pata by Miriam Makeba; Chupacapra; A Thousand Years by Christina Perri
2012–2013	Seven Brides for Seven Brothers by Saul Chaplin, Gene de Paul; Polka: Barn Dance; Waltz: Bless Your Beautiful Hide; Waltz: Wonderful, Wonderful Day; Polka: Barn Dance choreo. by Paola Mezzadri, Liudmila Vlasova	Carmen Suite by Rodion Shchedrin, Georges Bizet; Carmen Ouverture; Habanera; Intermezzo; Finale choreo. by Igor Shpilband, Liudmila Vlasova	Oblivion performed by Gidon Kremer
2011–2012	Rhumba: Volverás by Gloria Estefan; Samba: El Chupacapra	La Strada by Nino Rota	That's Amore by Dean Martin; Tu vuò fà l'americano performed by Sophia Loren
2010–2011	Waltz: Que Sera, Sera by Jay Livingston; Quickstep: Girls Girls Girls by Sailor	The Umbrellas of Cherbourg by Michel Legrand; Our Love is Easy; Goodnite by Melody Gardot	
	Original dance		
2009–2010	Torna a Surriento by Ernesto De Curtis; Tarantella: La Danza by Gioachino Rossini	Addiction: Requiem for a Dream by Clint Mansell	Eres Todo En Mi
2008–2009	Bei Mir Bistu Shein by Sholom Secunda; Tarantella: La Danza by Gioachino Rossini	Love Story by Nana Mouskouri	
2007–2008	Bubamara by Goran Bregović	La traviata by Giuseppe Verdi	
2006–2007	Tango Oblivion; Violentango	I've Got Rhythm by George Gershwin	
2005–2006	Historia de un Amour; Chupacapra	This is a Man's World by James Brown; Wring That Neck by Deep Purple	Still Loving You by Scorpions

=== With Zanni ===
Season	Original dance	Free dance
2004–2005	Let's Face the Music and Dance by Nat King Cole; Night and Day by Ella Fitzgerald; Peroxide Swing by Michael Bublé	Wake Up by Fats Waller; La Vie En Rose by Louis Armstrong; Entr' Act by Fats Waller
2003–2004	Jive: Hit the Road Jack; Blues: Why Don't You Do Right? (from Who Framed Roger Rabbit); Jive	Come Antes, Come Nunca, Come Siempre; Poeta en el Viento by Vicente Amigo
2002–2003	Waltz and Galop: Overture from Die Fledermaus by Johann Strauss II	Moonlight Sonata by Ludwig van Beethoven; Rhapsody on a Theme of Paganini by Sergei Rachmaninoff

=== With Lombardi ===
Season	Original dance	Free dance
2000–2001	Hits from the 1920s; Easy Ride; Hits from the 1920s	Fame (soundtrack); Out here on my own; Hot Lunch Jam by Christopher Gore

== Competitive highlights ==
GP: Grand Prix; CS: Challenger Series; JGP: Junior Grand Prix

=== With Lanotte ===
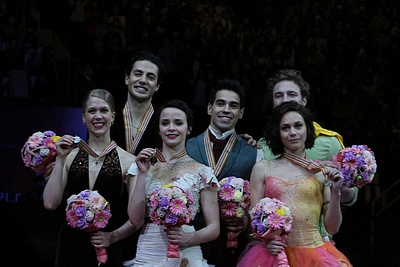
Cappellini and Lanotte with their fellow medalists at 2014 Worlds

International
Event	05–06	06–07	07–08	08–09	09–10	10–11	11–12	12–13	13–14	14–15	15–16	16–17	17–18
Olympics					12th				6th				6th
Worlds		13th	10th	10th	11th	8th	6th	4th	1st	4th	4th	6th	4th
Europeans		8th	7th	5th	6th		4th	3rd	1st	2nd	2nd	2nd	4th
GP Final					5th			4th	6th		3rd		6th
GP Bompard		5th	4th				3rd	2nd		WD			
GP Cup of China				4th						3rd	1st		
GP NHK Trophy						5th			2nd			3rd	3rd
GP Rostelecom		8th		4th	2nd						2nd		
GP Skate America					2nd				2nd				2nd
GP Skate Canada			2nd				3rd	2nd				4th	
CS Ice Star													1st
CS Nebelhorn												1st	
Universiade		1st											
Bavarian Open												1st	
Finlandia								2nd					
Nebelhorn						2nd							
Lombardia											1st		
Mont Blanc						1st							
International: Junior
Junior Worlds	4th												
JGP Final	3rd												
JGP Bulgaria	2nd												
JGP Slovakia	2nd												
National
Italian Champ.	1st J.	2nd	2nd	2nd	2nd	WD	1st	1st	1st	1st	1st	1st	1st
Team events
Olympics									4th T				4th T
World Team; Trophy							6th T (4th P)						
Team Challenge; Cup											2nd T (3rd P)		

=== With Zanni ===
International
Event	2001–02	2002–03	2003–04	2004–05
Junior Worlds		20th	5th	WD
JGP Final				3rd
JGP Germany		6th		
JGP Hungary				1st
JGP Italy		11th		
JGP Mexico			3rd	
JGP Serbia				1st
JGP Slovenia			3rd	
EYOF		7th		
National
Italian Champ.	2nd J.	2nd J.		1st J.

=== With Lombardi ===
International
Event	2000–01
World Junior Championships	27th
JGP Poland	14th

== Detailed results ==
=== With Lanotte ===
2017–18 season
Date	Event	SD	FD	Total
March 21–24, 2018	2018 World Championships	4; 77.46	3; 114.62	4; 192.08
February 19–20, 2018	2018 Winter Olympics	5; 76.57	6; 108.34	6; 184.91
January 15–21, 2018	2018 European Championships	3; 74.76	5; 105.89	4; 180.65
December 7–10, 2017	2017–18 Grand Prix Final	6; 74.24	5; 110.99	6; 185.23
November 24–26, 2017	2017 ISU Grand Prix Skate America	2; 72.70	2; 108.93	2; 181.63
November 10–12, 2017	2017 ISU Grand Prix NHK Trophy	3; 75.87	3; 110.69	3; 186.56
October 26–29, 2017	2017 CS Minsk-Arena Ice Star	1; 74.00	1; 109.49	1; 183.49
2016–17 season
Date	Event	SD	FD	Total
March 29 – April 2, 2017	2017 World Championships	7; 73.70	5; 110.03	6; 183.73
February 14–19, 2017	2017 Bavarian Open	1; 76.06	1; 114.08	1; 190.14
January 25–29, 2017	2017 European Championships	1; 75.65	2; 110.99	2; 186.64
November 25–27, 2016	2016 ISU Grand Prix NHK Trophy	3; 72.00	3; 108.42	3; 180.42
October 27–30, 2016	2016 ISU Grand Prix Skate Canada International	4; 71.08	4; 109.27	4; 180.35
September 22–24, 2016	2016 CS Nebelhorn Trophy	1; 71.42	1; 109.08	1; 180.50
2015–16 season
Date	Event	SD	FD	Total
April 22–24, 2016	2016 Team Challenge Cup		3; 108.96	2T/3P
March 28 – April 3, 2016	2016 World Championships	6; 70.65	4; 112.07	4; 182.72
January 26–31, 2016	2016 European Championships	1; 72.31	3; 105.70	2; 178.01
December 10–13, 2015	2015–16 Grand Prix Final	3; 70.14	2; 106.23	3; 176.37
November 20–22, 2015	2015 ISU Grand Prix Cup of Russia	2; 67.82	2; 103.79	2; 171.61
November 5–8, 2015	2015 ISU Grand Prix Cup of China	1; 66.39	1; 106.91	1; 173.30
September 17–20, 2015	2015 Lombardia Trophy	1; 69.72	1; 107.50	1; 177.22
2014–15 season
Date	Event	SD	FD	Total
March 23–29, 2015	2015 World Championships	3; 72.39	4; 105.11	4; 177.50
January 26 – February 1, 2015	2015 European Championships	3; 69.63	2; 101.89	2; 171.52
January 19–25, 2015	2014 Italian Championships	1; 76.55	1; 113.61	1; 190.16
November 7–9, 2014	2014 ISU Grand Prix Cup of China	2; 62.70	3; 86.88	3; 149.58
2013–14 season
Date	Event	SD	FD	Total
March 24–30, 2014	2014 World Championships	1; 69.70	4; 105.73	1; 175.43
February 6–22, 2014	2014 Winter Olympics	6; 67.58	7; 102.92	6; 169.50
January 13–19, 2014	2014 European Championships	1; 69.58	1; 102.03	1; 171.61
December 18–21, 2013	2014 Italian Championships	1; 74.25	1; 109.10	1; 183.35
December 5–8, 2013	2013–14 Grand Prix Final	6; 61.57	6; 95.01	6; 156.68
November 8–10, 2013	2013 ISU Grand Prix NHK Trophy	2; 64.58	2; 95.48	2; 160.06
October 17–20, 2013	2013 ISU Grand Prix Skate America	2; 69.88	2; 98.61	2; 168.49
2012–13 season
Date	Event	SD	FD	Total
March 10–17, 2013	2013 World Championships	5; 67.93	3; 100.11	4; 168.04
January 23–27, 2013	2013 European Championships	3; 66.53	3; 99.27	3; 165.80
December 19–22, 2012	2013 Italian Championships	1; 72.71	1; 103.53	1; 176.24
December 6–9, 2012	2012–13 Grand Prix Final	5; 66.11	4; 99.53	4; 165.64
November 15–18, 2012	2012 ISU Grand Prix Trophée Éric Bompard	2; 66.18	4; 87.08	2; 153.26
October 26–28, 2012	2012 ISU Grand Prix Skate Canada International	2; 65.09	2; 94.98	2; 160.06
October 4–7, 2012	2012 Finlandia Trophy	2; 64.16	1; 94.58	2; 158.74
2011–12 season
Date	Event	SD	FD	Total
April 19–22, 2012	2012 World Team Trophy	4; 63.70	4; 98.30	6T/4P; 162.00
March 26 – April 1, 2012	2012 World Championships	6; 65.11	6; 95.51	6; 160.62
January 23–29, 2012	2012 European Championships	6; 59.62	4; 93.47	4; 153.09
December 15–18, 2011	2012 Italian Championships	1; 71.01	1; 101.30	1; 172.31
November 17–20, 2011	2011 ISU Grand Prix Trophée Éric Bompard	3; 64.62	3; 89.14	3; 153.76
October 27–30, 2011	2011 ISU Grand Prix Skate Canada International	3; 61.92	2; 92.95	3; 154.87
2010–11 season
Date	Event	SD	FD	Total
April 24 – May 1, 2011	2011 ISU World Championships	8; 64.12	9; 90.39	8; 151.86
October 22–24, 2010	2010 ISU Grand Prix NHK Trophy	4; 55.68	5; 71.75	5; 127.43
September 24–26, 2010	2010 Nebelhorn Trophy	1; 59.86	4; 83.42	2; 143.28

2009–10 season
Date	Event	CD	OD	FD	Total
March 22–28, 2010	2010 ISU World Championships	7; 34.05	12; 51.40	14; 79.07	11; 164.52
February 19–22, 2010	2010 Winter Olympics	12; 33.13	12; 51.45	15; 82.74	12; 167.32
January 18–24, 2010	2010 European Championships	6; 35.93	9; 52.83	6; 87.34	6; 176.10
December 17–20, 2010	2010 Italian Championships	2	2	2	2; 187.62
December 2–6, 2009	2009–10 Grand Prix Final	NONE	5; 54.91	5; 84.30	5; 139.21
November 12–15, 2009	2009 ISU Grand Prix Skate America	3; 32.04	2; 54.09	3; 85.73	2; 171.86
October 22–25, 2009	2009 ISU Grand Prix Cup of Russia	2; 32.73	2; 52.58	2; 83.26	2; 168.57
2008–09 season
Date	Event	CD	OD	FD	Total
March 23–29, 2009	2009 ISU World Championships	11; 33.30	9; 56.33	11; 86.07	10; 175.70
January 20–25, 2009	2009 European Championships	7; 32.58	6; 54.38	5; 85.71	5; 172.67
December 18–21, 2009	2009 Italian Championships	2	2	2	2; 185.33
November 20–23, 2008	2008 ISU Grand Prix Cup of Russia	4; 32.57	3; 54.25	4; 82.94	4; 169.76
November 5–9, 2008	2008 ISU Grand Prix Cup of China	4; 32.52	3; 55.22	4; 85.37	4; 173.11
2007–08 season
Date	Event	CD	OD	FD	Total
March 16–23, 2008	2008 ISU World Championships	11; 31.52	10; 57.05	9; 90.46	10; 179.03
January 21–27, 2008	2008 European Championships	10; 30.97	7; 54.07	7; 87.60	7; 172.64
December 22–23, 2007	2008 Italian Championships	2	2	2	2; 179.43
November 15–18, 2007	2007 ISU Grand Prix Trophée Éric Bompard	3; 31.86	5; 49.11	4; 87.78	4; 168.75
November 1–4, 2007	2007 ISU Grand Prix Skate Canada International	2; 32.23	2; 53.90	2; 85.44	2; 171.57
2006–07 season
Date	Event	CD	OD	FD	Total
March 20–25, 2007	2007 ISU World Championships	12; 28.91	16; 47.60	13; 82.32	13; 158.83
January 22–28, 2007	2007 European Championships	9; 28.92	8; 49.78	11; 76.58	8; 155.28
January 17–19, 2007	2007 Winter Universiade	1	1	1	1; 165.25
January 4–7, 2007	2007 Italian Championships	2	2	2	2; 173.87
November 23–26, 2006	2006 ISU Grand Prix Cup of Russia	7; 28.12	8; 46.44	9; 74.97	8; 149.53
November 17–19, 2006	2006 ISU Grand Prix Trophée Éric Bompard	6; 31.18	4; 49.58	5; 79.01	5; 159.77
2005–06 season
Date	Event	CD	OD	FD	Total
March 6–12, 2006	2007 ISU Junior World Championships	4; 32.24	3; 54.68	6; 73.80	4; 160.72
November 24–27, 2005	2005–06 ISU Junior Grand Prix Final	2; 32.55	3; 50.69	3; 76.25	3; 159.49
September 29 – October 2, 2005	2005 Junior Grand Prix Bulgaria	1; 35.39	2; 49.62	2; 76.56	2; 161.57
September 1–4, 2005	2005 Junior Grand Prix Slovakia	1; 35.11	1; 52.78	2; 78.58	2; 166.47
