= Kim Lucine =

French figure skater

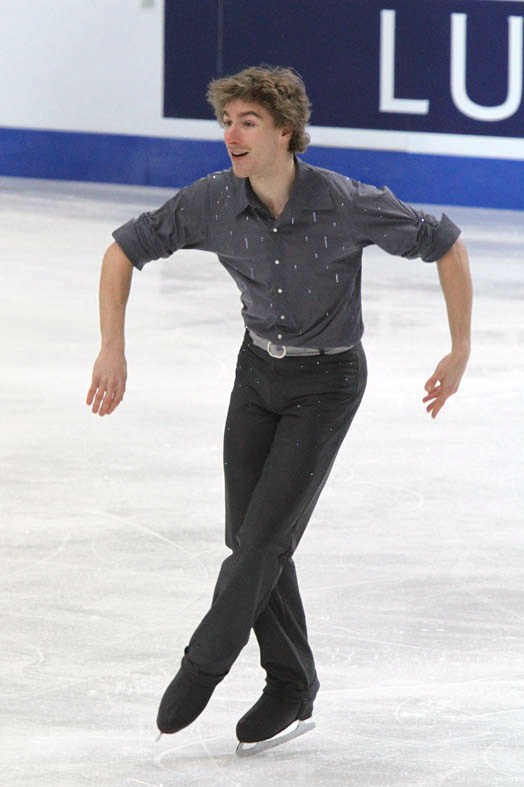
- Lucine in 2011.

Personal information
- Born: 16 September 1988 (age 38) Annecy, France
- Height: 1.80 m (5 ft 11 in)

Figure skating career
- Country: Monaco
- Coach: Didier Lucine, Nikolai Morozov, Sophie Golaz
- Began skating: 1994

Kim Lucine (born 16 September 1988) is a French figure skater who skates internationally for Monaco. He is the 2010 Ondrej Nepela Memorial silver medalist and 2013 Nordic bronze medalist.

== Career ==
Lucine represented France intentionally at the novice and junior level. Following a knee injury, he began competing for Monaco in the 2010-2011 season. He made his Europeans and Worlds debut that season, finishing 17th and 23rd, respectively. In 2012, he moved up to 13th at the European Championships and again finished 23rd at Worlds.

Lucine is coached by his father.

== Programs ==
Season	Short program	Free skating
2013–2014	Mario Brothers by Koji Kondo	Jungle Book by Charles Koechlin
2012–2013	Moanin' by Art Blakey	The Dark Side of the Moon by Pink Floyd
2011–2012	Summertime by George Gershwin	The Jungle Book by George Bruns
2010–2011	Phantom of the Opera by Andrew Lloyd Webber	Singin' in the Rain
2006–2007	The Mask (soundtrack) by various composers	Vendetta by Maxime Rodriguez
2005–2006	Concerto de Aranjuez	Pirates of the Caribbean by Klaus Badelt

== Results ==
=== For Monaco ===
Results
International
Event	2010–11	2011–12	2012–13	2013–14
Worlds	23rd	23rd	32nd	29th
Europeans	17th	13th	12th	16th
Challenge Cup		8th		
Ice Challenge		6th		
Istanbul Cup		3rd		
Merano Cup	7th			
Nebelhorn				14th
Nordics			3rd	
Ondrej Nepela	2nd	8th		
Slovenia Open				2nd

=== For France ===
Results
International
Event	2003–04	2004–05	2005–06	2006–07	2007–08
Junior Worlds			17th	12th	11th
JGP Bulgaria					5th
JGP Canada			6th		
JGP France		12th		5th	
JGP Germany		19th			6th
JGP Japan			10th		
JGP Taipei				5th	
EYOF		2nd J.			
Copenhagen	4th J.				
National
French Champ.		13th	12th	4th	6th
French Junior		3rd		1st	2nd
Master's		3rd J.	1st J.	1st J.	1st J.
