= Maciej Bernadowski =

Polish ice dancer

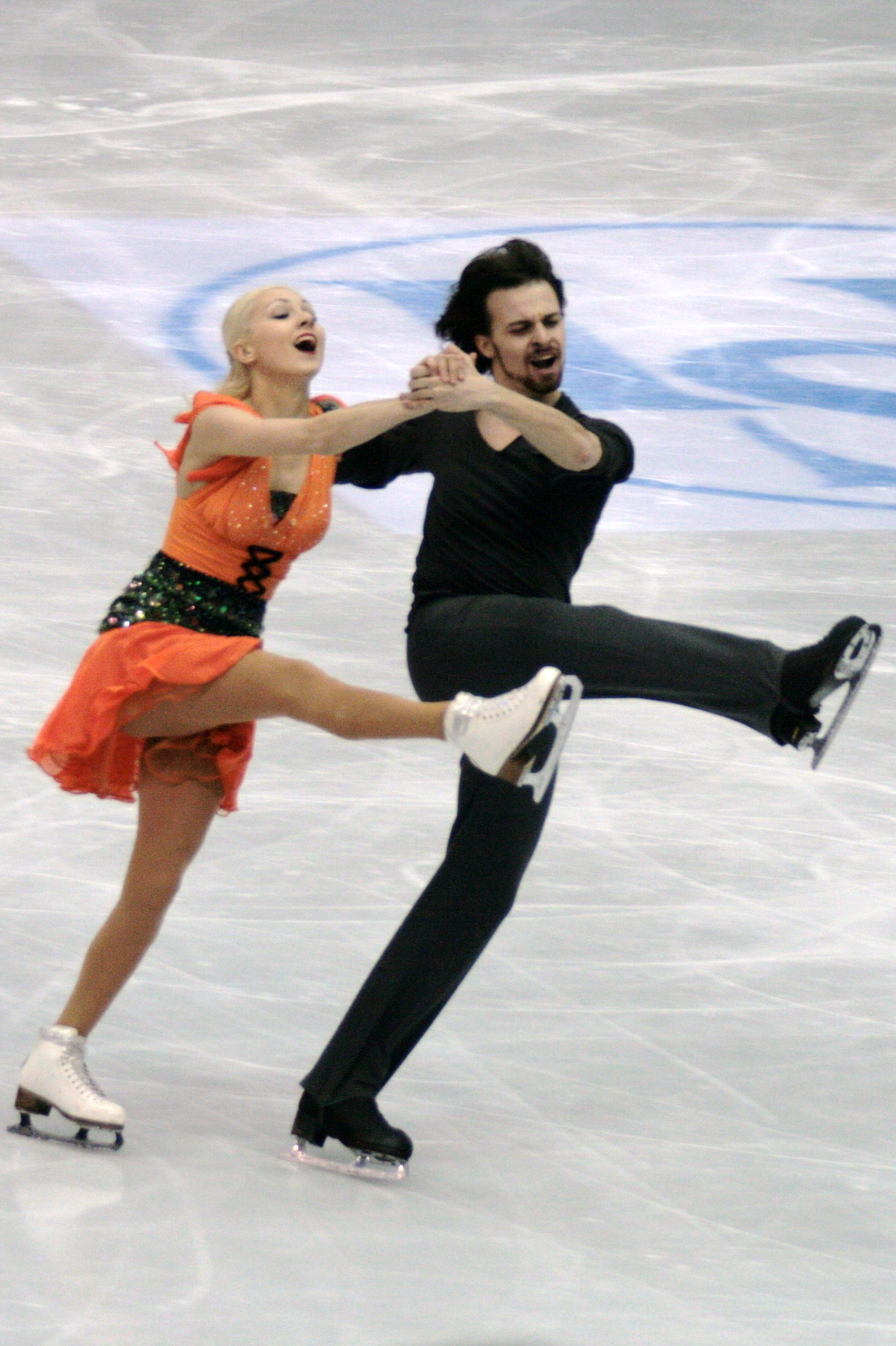

Personal information
- Full name: Maciej Bernadowski
- Born: 29 April 1989 (age 37) Łódź, Poland
- Height: 1.77 m (5 ft 9 1/2 in)

Figure skating career
- Country: Poland
- Partner: Alexandra Zvorigina
- Coach: Bożena Bernadowska
- Skating club: Lodz Figure Skating Association
- Began skating: 1994

Maciej Bernadowski (born 29 April 1989) is a Polish ice dancer. His former partners include Milena Szymczyk, Natalia Sinkiewicz, and Anastasia Gavrylovych. He and Szymczyk were coached by his mother, Bożena Bernadowska, in their hometown Łódź. Bernadowski currently skates with Alexandra Zvorigina, with whom he is a three-time (2011–2013) Polish national champion.

His elder brother, Filip Bernadowski, also competed in ice dance.

== Programs ==
(with Zvorigina)

Season	Short dance	Free dance
2012–2013	Gaite Parisienne by Jacques Offenbach; Kaiser-Walzer by Johann Strauss II	Fiddler on the Roof by Jerry Bock
2011–2012	Love of My Life by Carlos Santana; Black Machine	Notre-Dame de Paris by Riccardo Cocciante: Le temps des cathédrales; Tentative d'enlevement; Danse Mon Esmeralda

== Results ==
=== With Zvorigina ===
Results
International
Event	2010–2011	2011–2012	2012–2013
Worlds		29th	
Europeans		15th PR	
Ondrej Nepela		9th	10th
NRW Trophy		11th	
Coupe de Nice		9th	
National
Polish Champ.	1st	1st	1st
PR = Preliminary round

=== With Gavrylovych ===
Results
International
Event	2007–2008	2008–2009
Junior Worlds	16th J.	
JGP Bulgaria	11th J.	
JGP Great Britain	10 J.	
NRW Trophy	1st J.	
Baltic Cup		4th J.
National
Polish Championships	1st J.	
Mazovia Cup	2nd J.	
J. = Junior level

=== With Sinkiewicz ===
International
Event	2006–2007
Pavel Roman Memorial	9th J.
National
Polish Championships	1st J.
J. = Junior level

=== With Szymczyk ===
Results
International
Event	2004–2005	2005–2006
JGP Hungary	13th	
JGP Poland		12th
JGP Slovakia		10th
JGP Ukraine	12th	
Pavel Roman Memorial	6th J.	8th J.
National
Polish Championships	2nd J.	2nd J.
Junior Ice Dance Cup		6th
