= Manol Atanassov =

Bulgarian figure skater

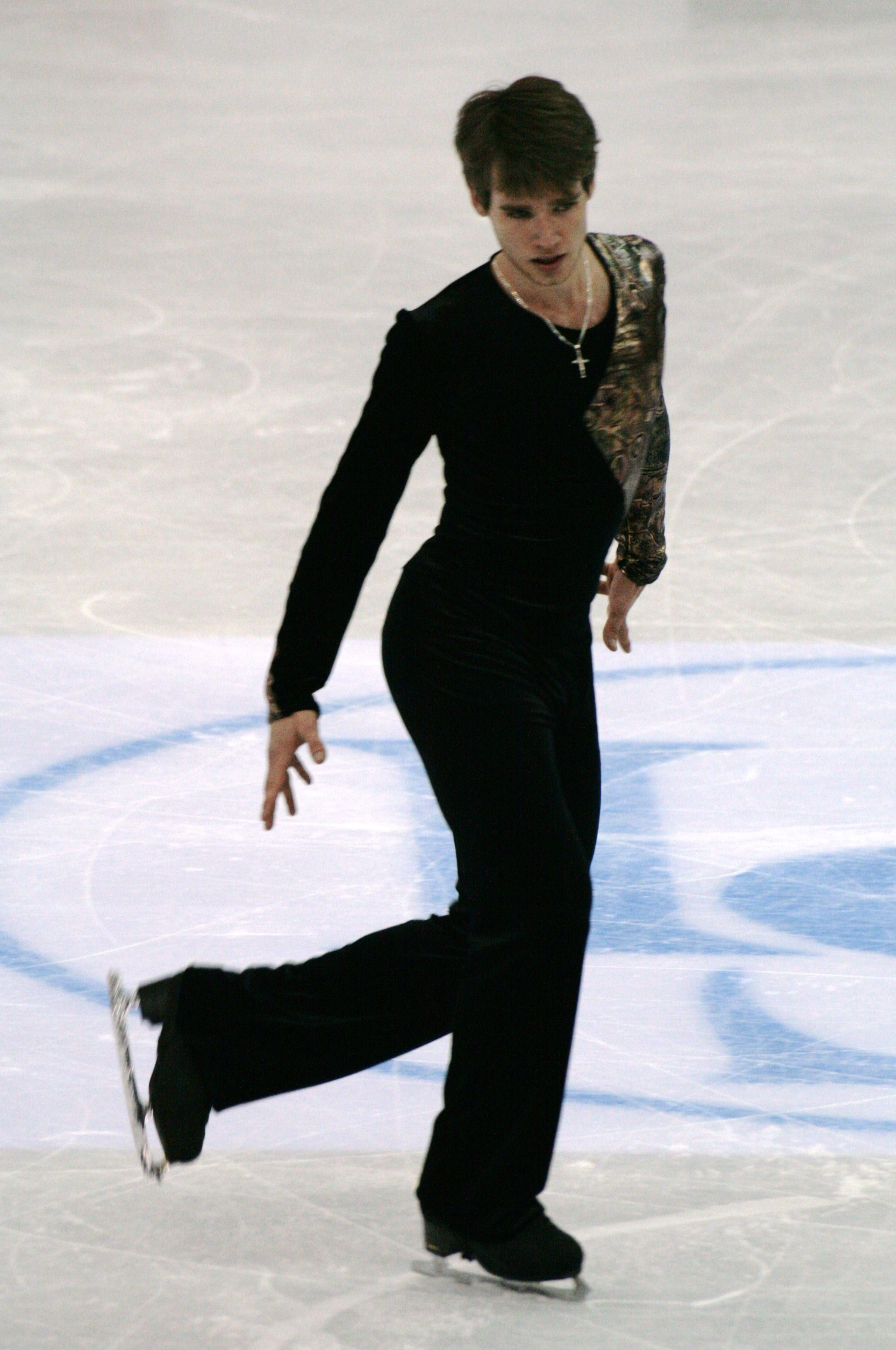
- Atanassov in March 2012

Personal information
- Born: 27 September 1991 (age 34) Plovdiv, Bulgaria
- Height: 1.80 m (5 ft 11 in)

Figure skating career
- Country: Bulgaria
- Coach: Nick Belovol, Vitali Egorov
- Skating club: Denkova-Staviski
- Began skating: 2003
- Retired: 2014

Manol Atanassov (Bulgarian: Манол Атанасов; born 27 September 1991 in Plovdiv) is a Bulgarian figure skater. He is the 2012 Denkova-Staviski Cup bronze medalist and a two-time Bulgarian national champion. He competed in the final segment at the 2013 European Championships in Zagreb, Croatia.

Atanassov emigrated to the United States at an early age. He started skating in 2003 and began representing Bulgaria in international competition in March 2010, at the 2010 World Junior Championships in The Hague, Netherlands.

== Programs ==
Season	Short program	Free skating
2013–2014	Oblivion by Astor Piazzolla	The Godfather Waltz; Tarantella by Nino Rota; The Godfather Theme by Slash
2011–2013	Oblivion by Astor Piazzolla	Cirque du Soleil; Storm; Querer; Barock; Distorted
2009–2011	Time 4 Time by Tomasz Kukurba, Jerzy Bawol, Tomasz Lato, Nigel Kennedy; Wedding by Goran Bregović	Cirque du Soleil; Storm; Querer; Barock; Distorted

== Competitive highlights ==
International
Event	09–10	10–11	11–12	12–13	13–14
World Champ.			26th P		
European Champ.			15th P	22nd	28th
Denkova-Staviski Cup				3rd	
Ice Challenge			14th		
Merano Cup				9th	
International: Junior
World Junior Champ.	40th	19th P			
Merano Cup		6th J			
National
Bulgarian Champ.			1st	1st	
J = Junior level; P = Preliminary round
