= Sonia Lafuente =

Spanish figure skater

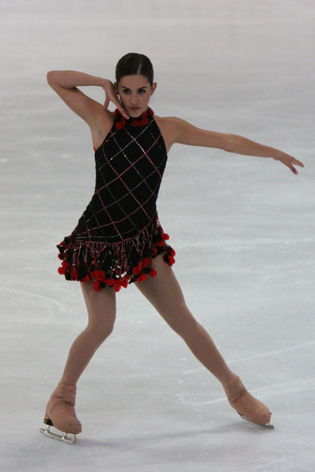
- Sonia Lafuente at the 2009 Nebelhorn Trophy

Personal information
- Full name: Sonia Lafuente Martínez
- Born: 7 December 1991 (age 34) Las Palmas de Gran Canaria, Canary Islands
- Height: 1.62 m (5 ft 4 in)

Figure skating career
- Country: Spain
- Discipline: Women's singles
- Began skating: 1996

Medal record
Spanish Championships
Gold medal – first place	2006 Villalba	Singles
Gold medal – first place	2010 Majadahonda	Singles
Gold medal – first place	2012 Jaca	Singles
Gold medal – first place	2013 Majadahonda	Singles
Gold medal – first place	2014 Jaca	Singles
Gold medal – first place	2015 Granada	Singles
Gold medal – first place	2016 San Sebastián	Singles
Silver medal – second place	2017 Vielha	Singles

Sonia Lafuente Martínez (born 7 December 1991) is a Spanish former figure skater. She is a seven-time Spanish national champion. Lafuente became the first Spanish skater to medal on the ISU Junior Grand Prix circuit when she won silver at the 2006 Mexico Cup.

== Personal life ==
Lafuente was born on 7 December 1991 in Las Palmas de Gran Canaria, Canary Islands. She is a university student, studying sports. She intends to spread her studies over several years in order to accommodate her career.

== Career ==
Lafuente began skating at age four, after her parents took her and her sister to a newly opened rink in Madrid. Carolina Sanz and Ivan Saez were her coaches for much of her career. In the 2003–04 season, Lafuente made her international debut as a novice, and finished with the bronze medal at the Merano Cup, an event she would win one year later. She began competing in junior internationals in 2005–06.

In the 2006–07 season, Lafuente became the first Spanish skater to win a Junior Grand Prix medal. She trained mainly in Majadahonda.

In 2008, Lafuente made her debut at the European Championships. She was 30th at her first Senior Worlds. The next season, she finished 23rd at Europeans and 26th at Worlds, which did not qualify her for the 2010 Winter Olympics. However, she was able to qualify for the Olympics with an 8th-place finish at the 2009 Nebelhorn Trophy, and finished 22nd in Vancouver. The next season, she received her first Grand Prix assignments, and finished 10th and 7th, respectively, at the 2010 Skate Canada International and the 2010 Trophee Eric Bompard. She was 12th at the European Championships but did not qualify for the free skate at Worlds.

Lafuente was 9th at the 2011 Nebelhorn Trophy, 7th at the 2011 Trophee Eric Bompard, 5th at the 2011 Golden Spin of Zagreb, and 15th at the 2012 European Championships in Sheffield.

Lafuente finished 7th at the 2013 European Championships and earned the minimum score to compete at the 2013 World Championships where she was 22nd.

The 2013 Nebelhorn Trophy was the last opportunity to qualify for the 2014 Winter Olympics. Lafuente was unable to win one of the six available ladies' berths, finishing 26th. In October 2013, she decided to move to Toronto, Ontario, Canada to train in Brian Orser's group. In 2014, she began working with Ghisland Briand and Tracy Wilson as her coaches.

After finishing 33rd at the 2016 European Championships, Lafuente decided to leave competition for a year.

In 2018, Lafuente was the sole performer in the music video for the song Pausa, from the album Autoterapia, by the Spanish band Izal.

== Programs ==
Season	Short program	Free skating
2015–2016	I Put a Spell On You	Je ne regrette rien; L'Hymne a l'amour performed by Édith Piaf
2014–2015	Caravan by Duke Ellington	Winter (from The Four Seasons) by Antonio Vivaldi; Invierno Porteño by Astor Piazzolla
2013–2014	Death and the Maiden by Franz Schubert	The Phantom of the Opera by Andrew Lloyd Webber
2012–2013	Romeo and Juliet (musical soundtrack)	West Side Story by Leonard Bernstein
2011–2012	Cry me a River	Selections by Michael Nyman (second half of season); Concierto de Aranjuez (first half of season)
2010–2011	The Feeling Begins by Peter Gabriel	Les Misérables by Claude-Michel Schönberg
2009–2010	Libertango by Astor Piazzolla	Orobroy by David Pena; Poeta by Vicente Amigo
2008–2009	Nocturne by Frédéric Chopin	Orobroy by David Pena; Poeta by Vicente Amigo
2007–2008	Tango de Roxane (from Moulin Rouge!)	Four Seasons by Antonio Vivaldi
2006–2007	Arabesque by James Birkin	Concerto Per Il Tuo Ricordo by Osvaldo Camahue
2005–2006	Poeta by Vicente Amigo	Night on Bald Mountain by Modest Mussorgski

== Competitive highlights ==
GP: Grand Prix; CS: Challenger Series; JGP: Junior Grand Prix

=== 2005–present ===
International
Event	05–06	06–07	07–08	08–09	09–10	10–11	11–12	12–13	13–14	14–15	15–16	16–17
Olympics					22nd							
Worlds			30th	26th	20th	25th	15th	22nd	32nd		37th	
Europeans			20th	23rd	17th	12th	15th	7th	28th	18th	33rd	
GP Bompard						7th	7th					
GP Skate Canada						10th						
CS Autumn Classic										7th		
CS Golden Spin										10th	12th	16th
Golden Spin						1st	5th					
Autumn Classic											9th	
Challenge Cup									4th			17th
Cup of Nice				5th	WD							
Cup of Tyrol												7th
Dragon Trophy								1st				
Finlandia Trophy								7th				
Open d'Andorra											1st	5th
Merano Cup						6th						
Nebelhorn Trophy					8th		9th		26th			
NRW Trophy				5th				10th				
Seibt Memorial											9th	
Volvo Open Cup								5th				
Universiade						2nd			15th	8th		
International: Junior
Junior Worlds	30th	14th	12th	20th								
JGP Andorra	12th											
JGP Austria			20th									
JGP France		5th										
JGP Mexico		2nd										
JGP Poland	23rd											
JGP South Africa				6th								
JGP Spain				9th								
JGP Turkey					13th							
JGP U.K.			3rd									
EYOF		1st										
Cup of Nice		4th J										
Merano Cup		1st J										
National
Spanish Champ.	1st	1st J		1st J	1st		1st	1st	1st	1st	1st	2nd
