= Stina Martini =

Austrian pair skater

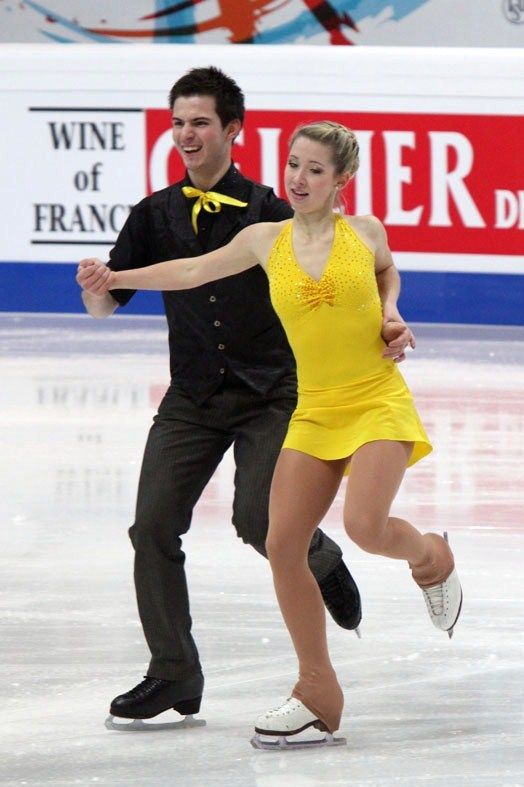
- Martini and Kiefer at the 2011 European Championships

Personal information
- Full name: Stina Patricia Vanni Martini
- Born: 7 February 1993 (age 33) Salzburg, Austria
- Home town: Lieboch, Austria
- Height: 1.60 m (5 ft 3 in)

Figure skating career
- Country: Austria
- Began skating: 1999
- Retired: 2013

Stina Martini (born 7 February 1993 in Salzburg) is an Austrian former competitive pair skater. With partner Severin Kiefer, she is a three-time Austrian national champion.

== Programs ==
(with Kiefer)

Season	Short program	Free skating
2012–2013	Chambermaid Swing by Parov Stelar	Sissi and Franz; Blue Danube; Radetzky March by Johann Strauss
2011–2012	Sissi and Franz; Blue Danube; Radetzky March by Johann Strauss	Poeta en el mar by Vincente Amigo
2010–2011	Once Upon a Time in the West by Ennio Morricone; Bonanza (soundtrack)	Addam's Family (soundtrack)
2009–2010	Great Balls of Fire; Stand By Me; Labamba	Addam's Family (soundtrack)

== Competitive highlights ==
JGP: Junior Grand Prix

With Kiefer

International
Event	2009–10	2010–11	2011–12	2012–13
World Champ.		21st	22nd	
European Champ.		15th	15th	13th
Cup of Nice				6th
Golden Spin			5th	2nd
Ice Challenge		8th	3rd J.	
Mont Blanc Trophy		5th		
NRW Trophy		8th		
International: Junior
Junior Worlds	20th	16th	15th	
JGP Austria			16th	
JGP Germany	21st			
National
Austrian Champ.	1st J.	1st	1st	1st
J. = Junior level
