= Kaiser-Walzer =

1889 waltz by Johann Strauss II

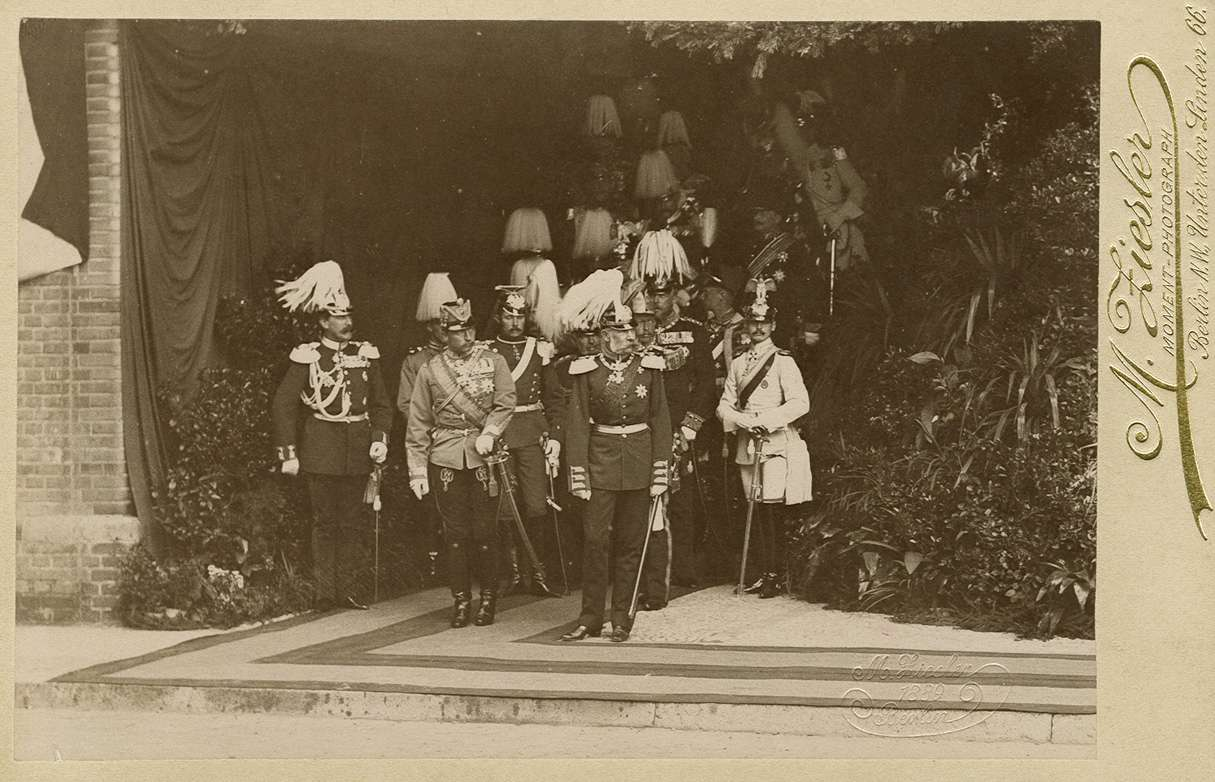
Emperors Wilhelm II and Franz Joseph I during the latter's visit to Berlin in 1889

A section from Kaiser-Walzer (3:01)

Kaiser-Walzer, Op. 437 (Emperor Waltz) is a waltz composed by Johann Strauss II in 1889. The waltz was originally titled Hand in Hand and was intended as a toast made in August of that year by Emperor of Austria Franz Joseph I on the occasion of his visit to the German Emperor Wilhelm II where it was symbolic as a 'toast of friendship' extended by Austria-Hungary to the German Empire.

Strauss' publisher, Fritz Simrock, suggested the title Kaiser-Walzer, since the title could allude to either monarch. The waltz was first performed in Berlin on 21 October 1889. The original cover of the piano edition bore the illustration of the Austrian Imperial Crown.

== Composition ==
A quiet march starts the waltz's introduction before a sweeping crescendo heralds the gentle principal melody of the first waltz. As more waltz sections are introduced, the mood remains constantly upbeat and triumphant. A cello solo, rather like a cadenza, near the end of the work reprises the melody of the first waltz section, before a trumpet fanfare ushers the end of the work, complete with a drumroll on the timpani and a strong brass flourish.

Waltz 2

== Instrumentation ==
It is scored for 2 flutes, 2 oboes, 2 clarinets, 2 bassoons, 4 horns, 2 trumpets, 3 trombones, timpani, cymbals, bass drum, snare drum, harp, and strings.
