= Ali Demirboğa =

Turkish figure skater

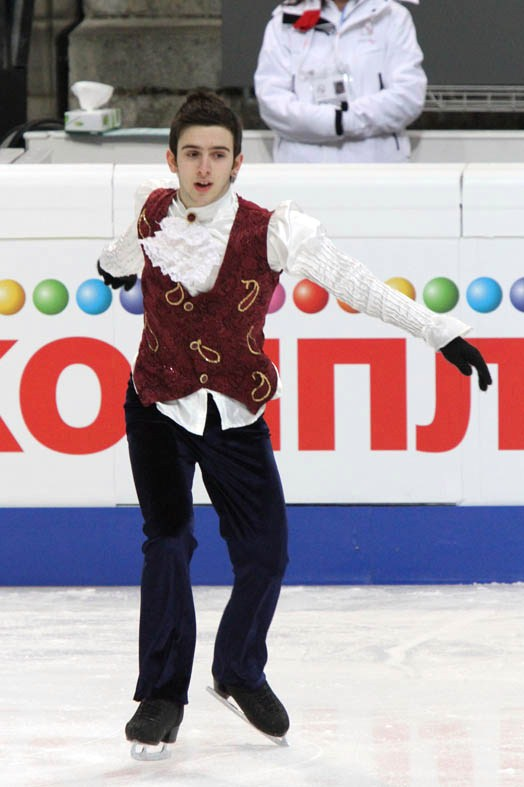
- Demirboga in 2011

Personal information
- Born: August 2, 1990 (age 36) Kocaeli, Turkey
- Height: 1.70 m (5 ft 7 in)

Figure skating career
- Country: Turkey
- Coach: Rana Belkis Gocmen
- Skating club: altın patenciler
- Began skating: 1999

Ali Demirboğa (born August 2, 1990) is a Turkish figure skater. He is a five-time (2010–2014) Turkish national champion.

== Programs ==
Season	Short program	Free skating
2013–2014	Freedom (from "Celtic Tiger") by Michael Flatley	"Comptine d'un autre été : L'après-midi" (from Amélie) by Yann Tiersen
2012–2013	Schindler's List by John Williams	Tears of the Sun by Hans Zimmer
2011–2012	Schindler's List by John Williams	Czardasz; Gypsy Reggae; Underground Cocek; Ya Ya performed by Goran Bregović
2010–2011	The Diva Dance (from The Fifth Element) by Éric Serra; Question Mark by Wade Robson	Czardasz; Gypsy Reggae; Underground Cocek; Ya Ya performed by Goran Bregović
2009–2010	Poliushko Pole	Path; Creeping Death by Apocalyptica

== Competitive highlights ==
CS: Challenger Series; JGP: Junior Grand Prix

International
Event	03–04	06–07	07–08	09–10	10–11	11–12	12–13	13–14	14–15	15–16
Worlds				45th		40th				
Europeans					27th	29th	28th	32nd		
CS Golden Spin									21st	
CS Ice Challenge									12th	
Challenge Cup							11th			
Crystal Skate							9th			
Cup of Nice						19th				
Denkova-Staviski								8th		
Golden Spin				15th						
Ice Challenge					12th					
Istanbul Cup						7th				
Nebelhorn					17th			29th		
Sarajevo Open									3rd	
Slovenia Open								6th		
Triglav Trophy				9th	9th	8th				
Universiade						23rd		22nd	29th	
International: Junior
JGP Croatia				19th						
JGP Turkey				22nd						
EYOF		19th								
Triglav Trophy	12th N.	8th J.	5th J.							
National
Turkish Champ.				1st	1st	1st	1st	1st	2nd	2nd
Levels: N. = Novice, J. = Junior
