= Lev Vinokur =

Israeli figure skater

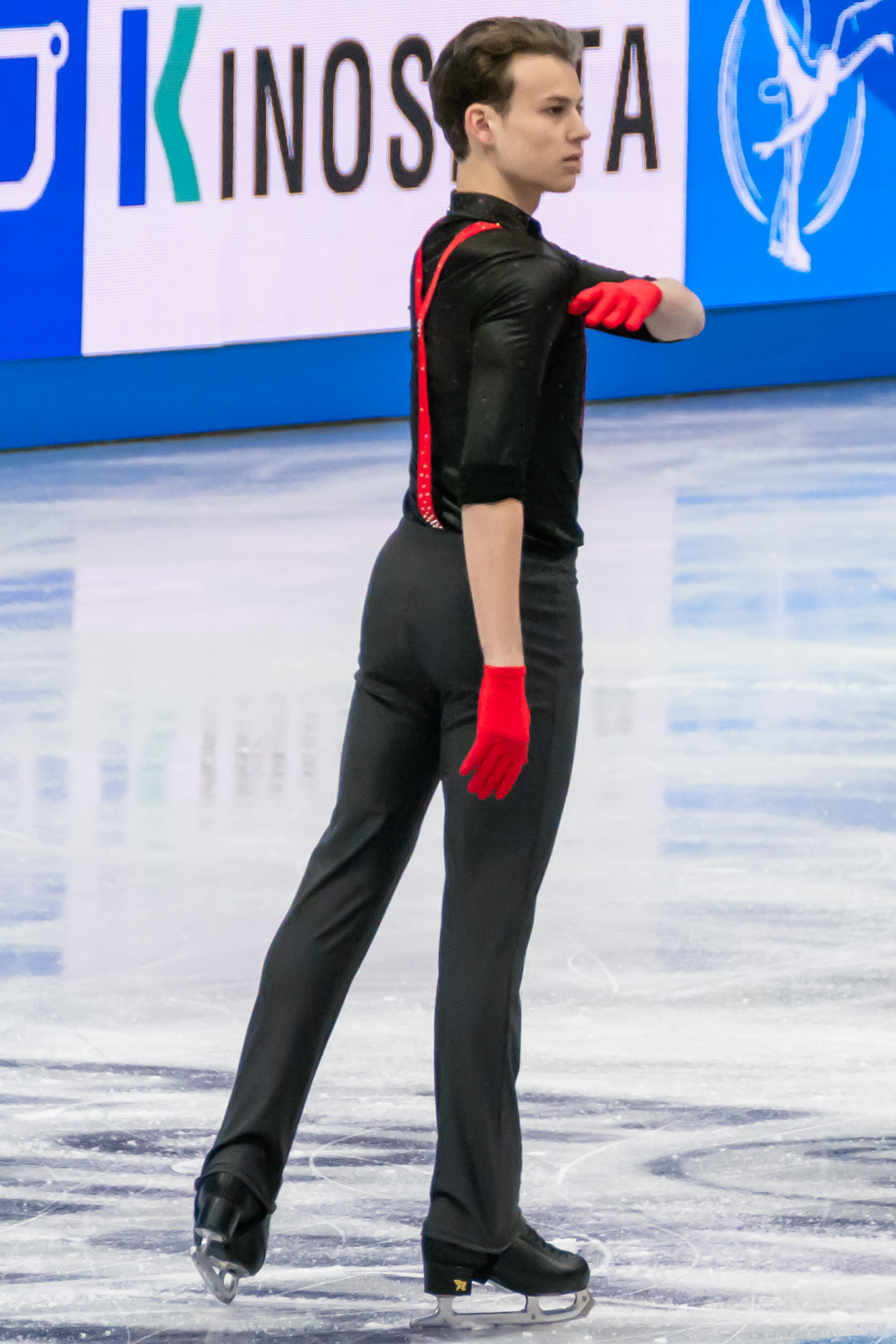
- Vinokur at the 2025 World Championships

Personal information
- Native name: Лев Винокур
- Born: 25 April 2006 (age 20) Moscow, Russia
- Home town: Hackensack, New Jersey, United States
- Height: 1.67 m (5 ft 5 1/2 in)

Figure skating career
- Country: Israel
- Discipline: Men's singles
- Coach: Nikolai Morozov; Timur Zakharov
- Skating club: Ice Holon
- Began skating: 2009

Medal record
Israeli Championships
Gold medal – first place	2025 Holon	Singles
Silver medal – second place	2023 Holon	Singles

Lev Vinokur (Hebrew: לב וינוקור, Russian: Лев Винокур; born 25 April 2006) is an Israeli figure skater. He is the 2025 Israeli national champion. Additionally, he is the 2023 Tallinn Trophy gold medalist.

== Personal life ==
Lev Vinokur was born in Moscow, Russia. He currently resides in Hackensack, New Jersey, in the United States.

== Career ==
=== Early career ===
Vinokur began skating competitively in 2009. He skated domestically for his home country, Russia, in the 2018–19 season.

He made his international debut for Israel in the 2019–20 season at the Junior Grand Prix in Latvia, however, his results were later disqualified due to his transfer from the Russian Federation not being officially finalised.

=== 2021–22 season: Junior Worlds debut ===
Vinokur opened his first official junior season for Israel at the Junior Grand Prix in Russia where he finished in 11th place. He followed this by finishing 7th at the Junior Grand Prix in Austria. A few weeks following his Grand Prix's, Lev competed at the Denis Ten Memorial, placing 6th.

In March, Lev competed at the 2022 European Youth Olympic Festival; placing 5th overall.

Lev finished his season with a 16th-place finish at the 2022 World Junior Championships.

=== 2022–23 season: National silver ===
Lev opened the new season with a bronze medal at the Philadelphia Summer International. He was assigned to the Junior Grand Prix in Poland and Italy, finishing 11th and 10th respectively. He subsequently debuted as a senior and won the silver medal at the 2022 Open d'Andorra, followed by placing 11th at the Golden Spin.

Vinokur made his first appearance at the Israeli Championships where he placed 2nd and won the silver medal.

At the 2023 Tallink Hotels Cup, Lev placed 7th.

Still eligible for junior competition, the federation sent Lev to the 2023 World Junior Championships where he placed 25th in the short program and did not advance to the free skate.

=== 2023–24 season ===
Vinokur began his season placing 18th at the Warsaw Cup. He later won gold at the 2023 Tallinn Trophy, silvers at the Latvia Trophy and Volvo Open and bronze at the Bavarian Open.

=== 2024–25 season: European and World Championships debut ===
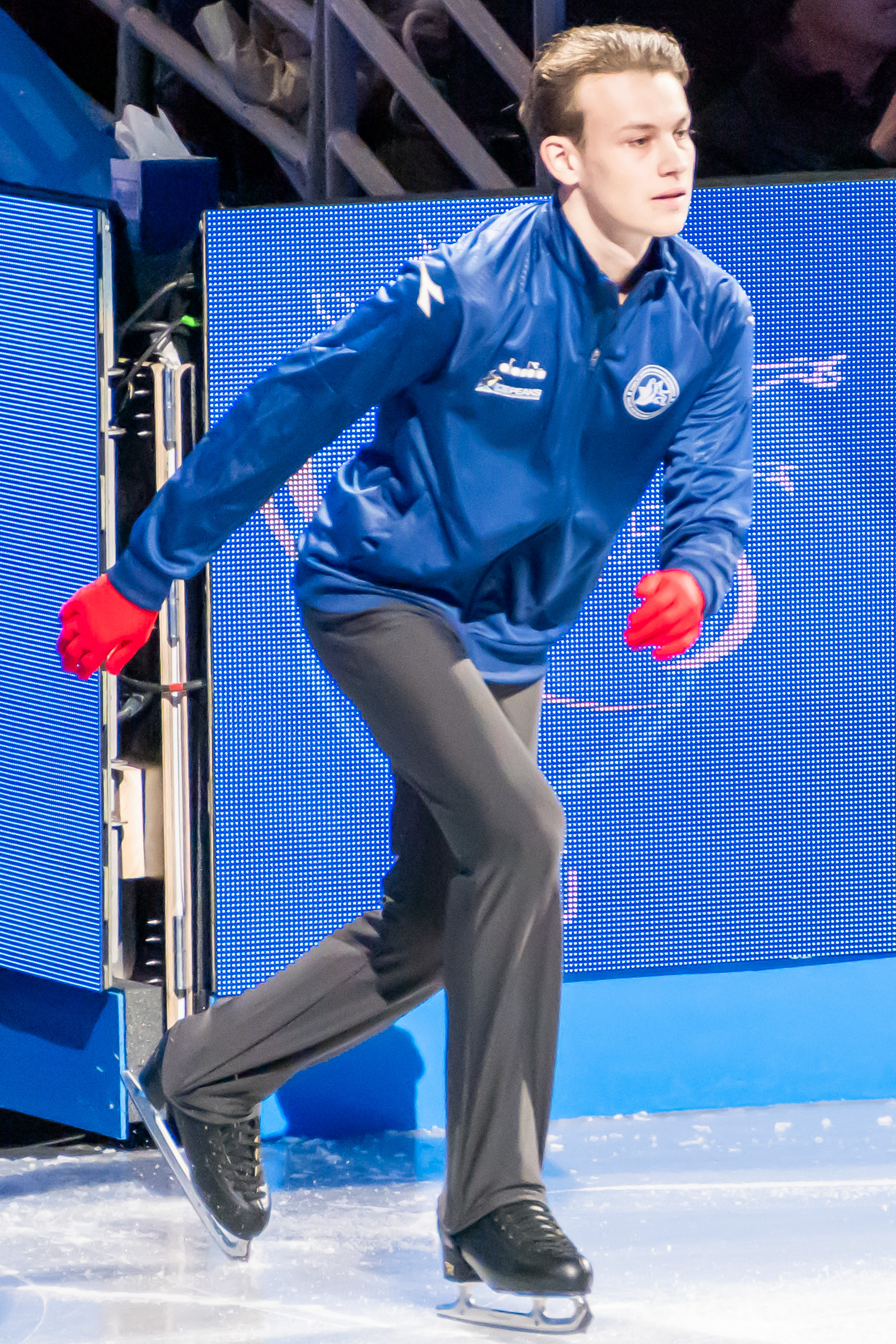
Vinokur before his short program at the 2025 World Championships

Opening the season at Challenger Series events, Lev placed 7th at the 2024 Lombardia Trophy, as well as placing 8th at the Nebelhorn Trophy. In November he won gold at the Denokova-Staviski Cup, and the NRW Trophy.

In December, at his third Challenger event, Lev placed 8th at the Golden Spin. Just one week later, competing at the 2025 Israeli Championships, Vinokur won the gold medal and became the national champion. He was later assigned to the European and World Championships.

At the 2025 European Championships in Tallinn, Estonia, Lev achieved a new personal best short program score. He finished the event in 13th place overall. "Overall, the experience this week was really good, and I’m happy with it. But right now, I’m a little bit disappointed with my free skate. I had a step out on the quad and the triple Axel, I usually can do those much better. This was not my best, but I can assure you it won’t happen again. I’ll definitely head back to the United States and train hard. There’s a lot more I want to show, and I’m motivated to keep improving" he shares.

Lev closed the season placing 25th in the short program at the 2025 World Championships. He did not advance to the free skate segment, leaving Israeli men without an Olympic quota for the upcoming Winter Olympic Games.

=== 2025–26 season ===
Beginning his season in the U.S., Lev placed 14th at the Cranberry Cup. Subsequently, he placed 8th at the Cup of Nice, 19th at Warsaw Cup and 18th at Golden Spin.

He finished the season placing 3rd at Skate Berlin.

=== 2026–27 season ===
Vinokur opened his season by placing 7th at the 2026 Cranberry Cup.

== Programs ==
Season	Short program	Free skating
2019–20	Way Down We Go by KALEO	The Barber of Seville by Gioachino Rossini
2021–22	I'm So Sorry by Imagine Dragons	Autumn (from The Four Seasons) by Antonio Vivaldi
2022–23	The Trail by Marcin Przybyłowicz choreo. by Galit Chait, Nikolai Morozov	Sarabande Trailerized by Wall of Noise choreo. by Galit Chait, Nikolai Morozov
2023–24	Keeping Me Alive by Jonathan Roy choreo. by Galit Chait, Alexei Bychenko	E lucevan le stelle (from Tosca) Giacomo Puccini performed by Hit Crew Big Band & Federico Paciotti choreo. by Galit Chait, Alexei Bychenko
2024–25	Harlem Nocturne by Ray Noble Orchestra performed by Ray Anthony & His Orchestra; Brick House by Commodores choreo. by Nikolai Morozov	Fly Me to the Moon; That's Life by Frank Sinatra choreo. by Nikolai Morozov
2025–26	Blues for Klook by Eddy Louiss choreo. by Nikolai Morozov	Formula 1 Theme (Epic Cover Version) by Champions United; Anguish of Heartache by NKOHA; Tokyo Drift by Teriyaki Boyz; Tokyo Drift (Trap Bass) by Trap Remix Guys choreo. by Nikolai Morozov
2026–27	Hefna by Danheim; Do I Wanna Know? by Arctic Monkeys	Fiddler on the Roof (Prologue and Tradition) by Jerry Bock & Sheldon Harnick; Sunrise, Sunset (from "Fiddler on the Roof") by Jerry Bock

== Competitive highlights ==
- JGP – Event of the ISU Junior Grand Prix Series
- CS – Event of the ISU Challenger Series
- TBD – Assigned
- WD – Withdrew from competition

Competition placements at senior level
Season	2022–23	2023–24	2024–25	2025–26	2026–27
World Championships			25th		
European Championships			13th		
Israeli Championships	2nd		1st		
CS Cranberry Cup				14th	7th
CS Golden Spin of Zagreb	11th		8th	18th	
CS Lombardia Trophy			7th		
CS Nebelhorn Trophy			8th		
CS Warsaw Cup		18th		19th	
Bavarian Open		3rd			
Denkova-Staviski Cup			1st		
Latvia Trophy		2nd			
Open d'Andorra	2nd				
Tallink Hotels Cup	7th				
Tallinn Trophy		1st			
Trophée Métropole Nice				8th	
Volvo Open Cup		2nd			

Competition placements at junior level
Season	2019–20	2021–22	2022–23
World Junior Championships		16th	25th
Israeli Championships	1st		1st
JGP Austria		7th	
JGP Italy			10th
JGP Latvia	DSQ		
JGP Poland			11th
JGP Russia		11th	
Denis Ten Memorial		6th	
European Youth Olympic Festival		5th	
Philadelphia Summer			3rd

== Detailed results ==
ISU personal best scores in the +5/-5 GOE System
Segment	Type	Score	Event
Total	TSS	227.29	2024 CS Lombardia Trophy
Short program	TSS	76.35	2025 European Championships
Short program	TES	42.83	2025 European Championships
Short program	PCS	35.08	2024 CS Lombardia Trophy
Free skating	TSS	152.43	2024 CS Lombardia Trophy
Free skating	TES	80.33	2024 CS Lombardia Trophy
Free skating	PCS	72.10	2024 CS Lombardia Trophy

=== Senior level ===
Results in the 2022–23 season
Date	Event	SP		FS		Total	
Date	Event	P	Score	P	Score	P	Score
Nov 16–20, 2022	2022 Open d'Andorra	1	70.09	2	121.10	2	191.19
Dec 7–10, 2022	(Croatia) 2022 CS Golden Spin of Zagreb	12	49.95	11	109.81	11	159.76
Dec 14–15, 2022	(Israel) 2023 Israeli Championships	2	69.55	2	130.60	2	200.15
Feb 16–19, 2023	(Estonia) 2023 Tallink Hotels Cup	9	57.25	6	133.37	7	190.62

Results in the 2023–24 season
Date	Event	SP		FS		Total	
Date	Event	P	Score	P	Score	P	Score
Nov 16–19, 2023	(Poland) 2023 CS Warsaw Cup	24	49.20	15	121.65	18	170.85
Nov 21–24, 2023	(Estonia) 2023 Tallinn Trophy	2	65.93	1	129.97	1	195.90
Dec 8–10, 2023	2023 Latvia Trophy	2	69.90	2	135.46	2	205.36
Jan 18–21, 2024	(Latvia) 2024 51st Volvo Open Cup	3	57.08	2	125.90	2	182.98
Jan 30 – Feb 4, 2024	(Germany) 2024 Bavarian Open	5	68.59	3	147.28	3	215.87

Results in the 2024–25 season
Date	Event	SP		FS		Total	
Date	Event	P	Score	P	Score	P	Score
Sep 13–15, 2024	(Italy) 2024 CS Lombardia Trophy	6	75.36	7	152.43	7	227.79
Sep 19–21, 2024	(Germany) 2024 CS Nebelhorn Trophy	9	70.61	10	138.29	8	208.90
Nov 5–10, 2024	(Bulgaria) 2024 Denkova-Staviski Cup	1	82.97	1	151.34	1	234.31
Dec 4–7, 2024	(Croatia) 2024 CS Golden Spin of Zagreb	10	69.04	8	130.79	8	199.83
Dec 11–12, 2024	(Israel) 2025 Israeli Championships	1	84.13	1	162.71	1	246.84
Jan 28 – Feb 2, 2025	(Estonia) 2025 European Championships	14	76.35	12	144.69	13	221.04

Results in the 2025–26 season
Date	Event	SP		FS		Total	
Date	Event	P	Score	P	Score	P	Score
Aug 7–10, 2025	(United States) 2025 CS Cranberry Cup International	13	59.39	14	110.95	14	170.34
Oct 1-5, 2025	(France) 2025 Trophée Métropole Nice Côte d'Azur	9	46.35	6	103.68	8	150.03
Nov 19–23, 2025	(Poland) 2025 CS Warsaw Cup	17	56.90	19	106.64	19	163.54
Dec 3–6, 2025	(Croatia) 2025 CS Golden Spin of Zagreb	16	66.52	18	112.44	18	178.96

=== Junior level ===
Results in the 2021–22 season
Date	Event	SP		FS		Total	
Date	Event	P	Score	P	Score	P	Score
Sep 15–18, 2021	2021 JGP Russia	11	60.16	11	105.46	11	165.62
Oct 6–9, 2021	2021 JGP Austria	6	62.53	6	127.62	7	190.15
Oct 27–31, 2021	(Kazakhstan) 2021 Denis Ten Memorial Challenge	3	68.98	6	129.38	6	198.36
Mar 23–24, 2022	(Finland) 2022 European Youth Olympic Festival	6	61.49	4	115.91	5	177.40
Apr 13–17, 2022	(Estonia) 2022 World Junior Championships	13	67.20	15	124.91	16	192.11

Results in the 2022–23 season
Date	Event	SP		FS		Total	
Date	Event	P	Score	P	Score	P	Score
Aug 3–7, 2022	(United States) 2022 Philadelphia Summer International	3	53.65	3	92.73	3	146.38
Oct 5–8, 2022	2022 JGP Poland	9	64.59	13	111.36	11	175.95
Oct 11–15, 2022	2022 JGP Italy	10	60.95	9	118.54	10	179.49
Feb 27 – Mar 5, 2023	(Canada) 2023 World Junior Championships	25	58.90	—N/a	—N/a	25	58.90
