= Anna Vernikov =

American-Israeli pair skater

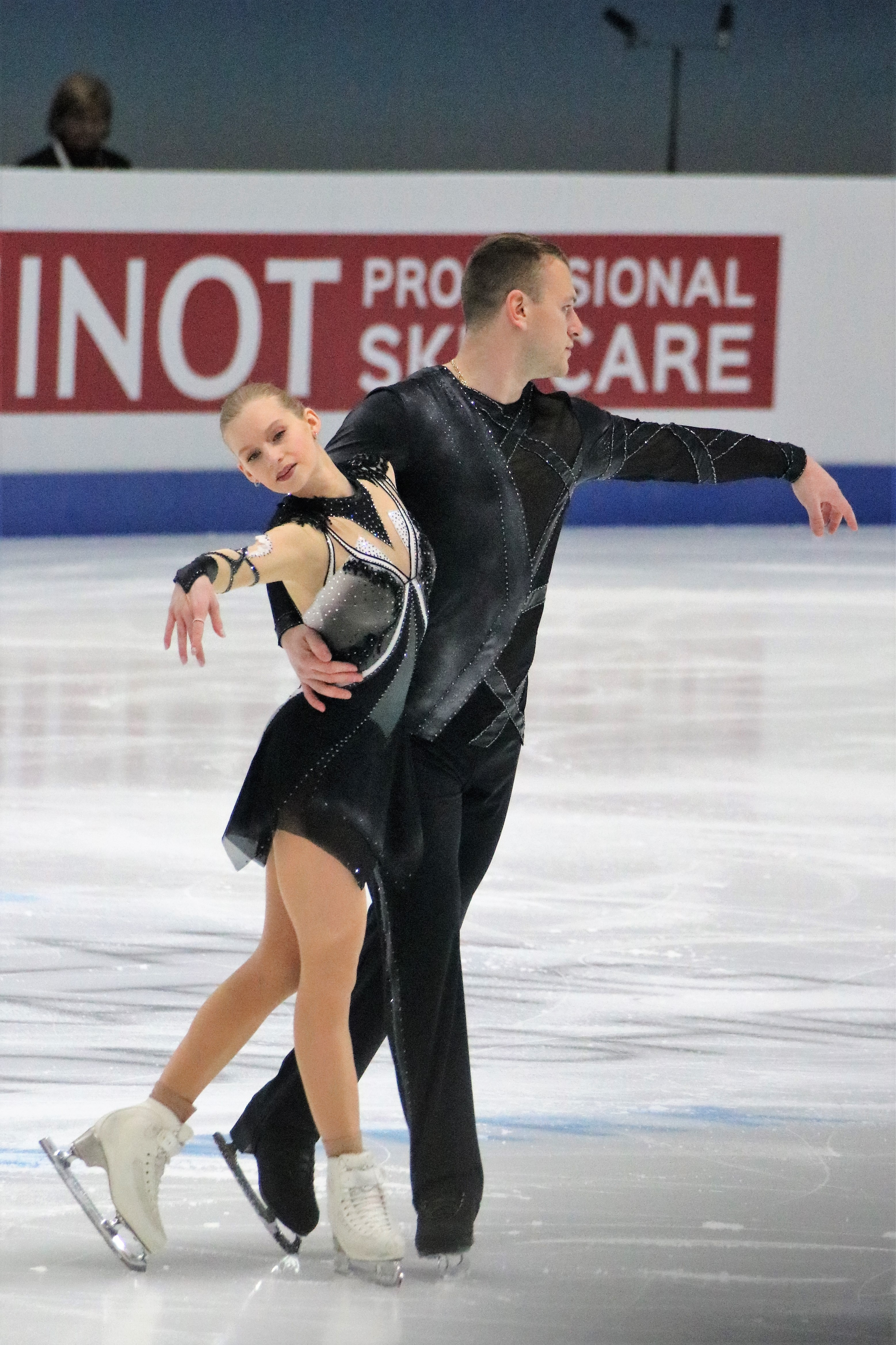
- Vernikov/Krasnopolski at the 2020 European Championships

Personal information
- Native name: אנה ורניקוב (Hebrew)
- Born: July 15, 2002 (age 24) Bridgewater, New Jersey, United States
- Home town: Manalapan, New Jersey
- Height: 1.65 m (5 ft 5 in)

Figure skating career
- Country: Israel
- Coach: Galit Chait Moracci; Daniel Raad

Anna Vernikov (Hebrew: אנה ורניקוב; born July 15, 2002) is an American-Israeli pair skater. With her former skating partner, Evgeni Krasnopolski, she is the 2020 Israeli national champion and competed in the final segment at the 2020 European Championships.

== Personal life ==
Vernikov was born on July 15, 2002, in Bridgewater Township, New Jersey.

== Career ==
=== Early career ===
Vernikov competed in ladies' singles for the United States, but never qualified for the U.S. Championships.

=== 2018–2019 season ===
In 2019, Vernikov teamed up with Evgeni Krasnopolski, 14 years her senior, to compete in pair skating for Israel. She had never competed the discipline prior to the partnership. In their debut international competition, the 2019 Open Ice Mall Cup, Vernikov/Krasnopolski won the bronze medal behind Croatia's Lana Petranović / Antonio Souza-Kordeiru and Zoe Jones / Christopher Boyadji of Great Britain.

=== 2019–2020 season ===
Vernikov/Krasnopolski opened their season with a tenth-place finish at 2019 CS Nebelhorn Trophy. They then won the bronze medal at the Volvo Open Cup in November. At their second Challenger, 2019 CS Golden Spin of Zagreb, Vernikov/Krasnopolski set personal bests in all segments and finished 11th overall.

In December, Vernikov/Krasnopolski won the national title at the Israeli Championships. They were assigned to both the 2020 European Championships and the 2020 World Championships. They qualified to the free skating and finished 13th overall at Europeans. Vernikov/Krasnopolski then competed at Challenge Cup in February, finishing in fifth. The World Championships, scheduled for March, were postponed and eventually cancelled due to the COVID-19 pandemic.

=== 2020–2021 season ===
In October, Vernikov/Krasnopolski, alongside their coaches and the Israeli national team, relocated their training base from Hackensack, New Jersey, to Montclair State University in Montclair, New Jersey. They received their first-ever Grand Prix assignment, the 2020 Rostelecom Cup, but withdrew due to pandemic travel restrictions. Since assignments for the 2020–21 Grand Prix were allotted based on proximity to skaters' home country and/or training location, they were later reassigned to 2020 Skate America to replace Russia's Evgenia Tarasova / Vladimir Morozov; under normal circumstances, skaters who withdraw from a Grand Prix will not be assigned a replacement one. Vernikov/Krasnopolski finished eighth at Skate America. They placed nineteenth at the 2021 World Championships.

== Programs ==
=== With Krasnopolski ===
Season	Short program	Free skating
2020–2021	Love Story performed by Il Divo choreo. by Galit Chait Moracci	The Experience choreo. by Galit Chait Moracci
2019–2020	Love Story performed by Il Divo choreo. by Galit Chait Moracci; Moonlight by Viper choreo. by Galit Chait Moracci	The Experience choreo. by Galit Chait Moracci

== Competitive highlights ==
GP: Grand Prix; CS: Challenger Series

=== With Krasnopolski ===
International
Event	18–19	19–20	20–21
Worlds		C	19th
Europeans		13th	
GP Rostelecom Cup			WD
GP Skate America			8th
CS Golden Spin		11th	
CS Nebelhorn Trophy		10th	
Challenge Cup		5th	WD
Ice Mall Cup	3rd		
Volvo Open		3rd	
National
Israeli Champ.		1st	
TBD = Assigned; WD = Withdrew; C = Cancelled

=== Ladies' singles ===
(for the United States)

National
Event	13–14	14–15	15–16	16–17	17–18	18–19
North Atlantic Reg.	8th Q V	7th Q V	3rd Q I 7th I	4th Q N 11th N	11th J	6th J
Q = Qualifying; Levels: V = Juvenile; I = Intermediate; N = Novice; J = Junior

== Detailed results ==
2020–21 season
Date	Event	SP	FS	Total
March 22–28, 2021	2021 World Championships	17; 53.67	20; 91.36	19; 145.03
October 23–24, 2020	2020 Skate America	8; 48.23	7; 97.89	8; 146.12
2019–20 season
Date	Event	SP	FS	Total
February 20–23, 2020	2020 Challenge Cup	7; 50.31	4; 103.05	5; 153.36
January 20–26, 2020	2020 European Championships	13; 49.34	13; 96.01	13; 145.35
December 11–12, 2019	2020 Israeli Championships	1; 57.10	1; 108.27	1; 165.37
December 4–7, 2019	2019 CS Golden Spin of Zagreb	10; 49.52	9; 100.92	11; 150.44
November 5–10, 2019	2019 Volvo Open Cup	4; 53.69	3; 96.84	3; 150.53
September 26–29, 2019	2019 CS Nebelhorn Trophy	10; 48.74	10; 91.16	10; 139.90
2018–19 season
Date	Event	SP	FS	Total
February 20–23, 2019	2019 Open Ice Mall Cup	4; 50.46	2; 108.62	3; 159.08
