= Tamir Kuperman =

Israeli figure skater (born 2007)

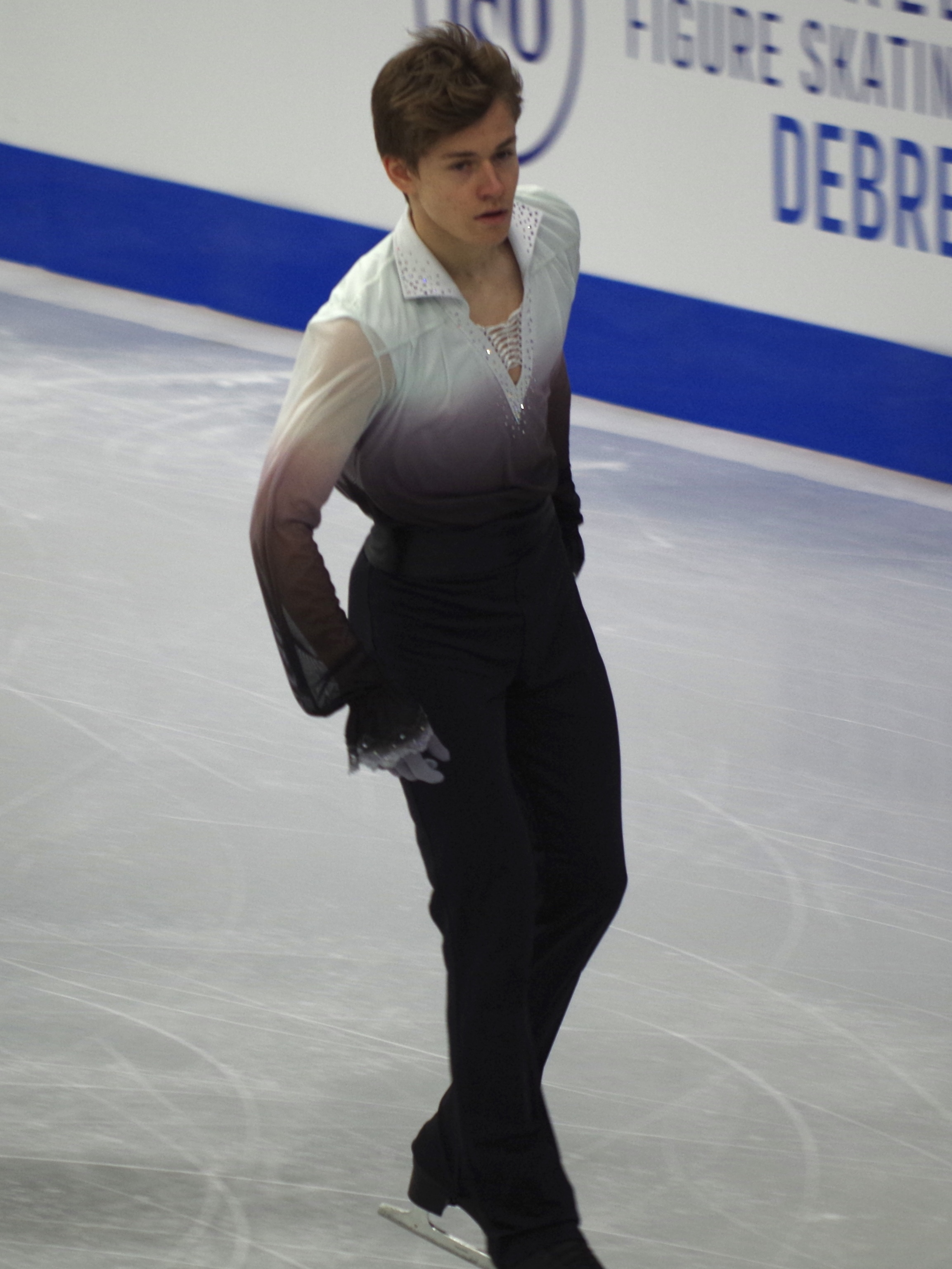
- Kuperman at the 2025 World Junior Championships

Personal information
- Native name: תמיר קופרמן
- Born: September 13, 2007 (age 19) Tel Aviv, Israel
- Home town: Rishon Le Zion, Israel
- Height: 1.77 m (5 ft 10 in)

Figure skating career
- Country: Israel
- Discipline: Men's singles
- Coach: Galit Chait Moracci; Evgeni Krasnopolski
- Skating club: Ice Dream Academy of New Jersey
- Began skating: 2016

Medal record
Israeli Championships
Gold medal – first place	2026 Holon	Singles

Tamir Kuperman (Hebrew: תמיר קופרמן; born September 13, 2007) is an Israeli competitive figure skater. Kuperman is the 2026 Israeli national champion and a four-time Israeli national junior champion (2022–2025). Internationally, he is the 2026 Skate America bronze medalist.

== Personal life ==
Kuperman was born on September 13, 2007, in Tel Aviv, Israel. In his early career, he trained at Ice Peaks Holon, in Holon. In June 2022, he moved to New Jersey and started training at Ice Dream Academy of New Jersey. His sister, Nikol Kuperman, is also a competitive skater at a junior level from the 2026-27 season.

== Career ==
=== Early career ===
Kuperman began figure skating in 2016 at Ice Peaks Holon. He competed in the basic novice category at the 2018 Volvo Open Cup, finishing in fourth place. In the 2019–20 season, he placed fourth in the advanced novice event at the 2019 Volvo Open Cup and seventh at the 2020 Sofia Trophy.

=== 2021–22 season ===
Kuperman made his junior international debut at the 2021 Volvo Open Cup in Riga. He placed 5th place.

=== 2022–23 season: Junior international debut ===
In June 2022, prior to the start of the season, Kuperman relocated to New Jersey, United States, to train at Ice Dream Academy of New Jersey under coaches Alexei Bychenko, Galit Chait Moracci, and Evgeni Krasnopolski.

He opened his season at the Philadelphia Summer International, placing fifth in the junior event. He made his ISU Junior Grand Prix debut in October at the JGP Poland II in Gdańsk, where he finished 21st. Later in the season, Kuperman achieved a career milestone at the Open d'Andorra, winning the junior gold medal; this marked his first victory in an international competition. He continued to reach the podium at other minor international events, taking the bronze medal at the EduSport Trophy in Bucharest and the silver medal at the Tallink Hotels Cup in Tallinn.

=== 2023–24 season ===
Competing on the ISU Junior Grand Prix series, Kuperman finished seventh at JGP Thailand and fifth at JGP Armenia. He found considerable success at other junior international events, winning gold medals at both the Denkova-Staviski Cup and the Santa Claus Cup, as well as taking the silver medal at the Bavarian Open. He concluded his season at the 2024 World Junior Figure Skating Championships in Taipei, where he finished nineteenth.

=== 2024–25 season ===
Kuperman with his coach Galit Chait at the 2025 World Junior Figure Skating Championships.

Beginning the 2024-25 season, Kuperman began training under Galit Chait Moracci and Evgeni Krasnopolski. Kuperman remained on the junior level and was assigned to two Junior Grand Prix events. At his first assignment, the JGP Czech Republic in Ostrava, he placed fourth in the short program with 72.75 points. In the short program, he landed a clean triple Axel for the first time in an ISU-recognized competition. In the free skate, he scored 137.72 points, placing third in that segment ahead of eventual bronze medalist Adam Hagara. However, Kuperman finished fourth overall with a total score of 210.47, missing the podium by a narrow margin of 0.76 points behind Hagara. In the free skate, he landed a clean quadruple Toe loop for the first time in an ISU-recognized competition.

At his second event, the JGP Poland (Solidarity Cup), Kuperman set a new personal best in the short program with a score of 75.58, placing second going into the free skate. He finished fourth in the free skate and fourth overall with a total of 195.38 points. It was another heartbreakingly close result; he missed the bronze medal by just 0.48 points, finishing behind South Korea’s Minkyu Seo, the 2024 World Junior champion.

Later in the season, Kuperman found success in senior and junior competitions, winning gold medals at the Diamond Spin, NRW Trophy, and Bavarian Open. The Santa Claus Cup and the Bavarian Open served as qualification events for Israel’s junior men’s figure skaters—Kuperman, Nikita Sheiko, and Kirill Sheiko. Based on the combined results, Kuperman earned Israel’s berth for the World Junior Figure Skating Championships. He concluded his season at the 2025 World Junior Figure Skating Championships in Debrecen, where he finished twelfth. In the free skate, he landed a clean quadruple Salchow for the first time at an ISU-recognized competition.

=== 2025–26 season ===
Kuperman moved up to the senior level for international competition. He opened the season at the Cranberry Cup International, finishing fourth. He was subsequently assigned to ISU Skate to Milano, the final Olympic qualifying competition, where he placed tenth. Later in the season, he captured his first senior international title, winning the gold medal at the Denkova-Staviski Cup, where he landed a clean quadruple Lutz for the first time. He also competed at the Warsaw Cup, part of the ISU Challenger Series, where he finished sixth. He also competed at 2025 CS Golden Spin of Zagreb and marked his new personal best, 78.08, in SP. He finished 15th at the competition. He won the Israeli Figure Skating Championships in 2025.

In January, Kuperman finished seventh at the 2026 European Figure Skating Championships in his debut at this event. "I was super nervous today,” he said after the free skate. “I’m so happy that I could skate to secure a second spot for Israel. It’s always nice to be able to qualify more spots, and that was my goal that I had in my mind."

In March, Kuperman completed his season at the 2026 World Championships. He placed nineteenth in the short program and eighteenth in the free skate, finishing eighteenth overall.

=== 2026–27 season ===
Kuperman opened the season at the 2026 CS Budapest Trophy, where he placed seventh. He was assigned to the 2026 Crystal Skate of Romania, finishing first. Kuperman made his senior Grand Prix debut at the 2026 Skate America, where he set new personal bests in both the short program and the free skate and won the bronze medal. “I feel amazing!” said Kuperman after the free skate, describing it as probably the best performance of his career so far. “I almost show everything that I can. Almost my maximum. I think it’s the first competition in the season that I actually feel that I’m in the program because all the competitions before, in the long I never could focus on the program.” He became the second Israeli man to win a Grand Prix medal, after Alexei Bychenko.

== Programs ==
Competition programs by season
Season	Short program	Free skate program
2022-23	"Caruso": Performed by Hauser; Choreo. by Galit Chait	"Exogenesis: Symphony Part I": Performed by Muse; Choreo. by Galit Chait
2023-24	"You Raise Me Up": Performed by Josh Groban; Choreo. by Galit Chait	The Phantom of the Opera: 1. "Phantasia"; 2. "The Music of the Night"; 3. "The Point of No Return"; Composed by Andrew Lloyd Webber; Choreo. by Galit Chait
2024-25	"The Puss Suite": Composed by Henry Jackman; Choreo. by Galit Chait	"E lucevan le stelle": From Tosca; Composed by Giacomo Puccini; Choreo. by Galit Chait
2025-26	Medley: 1. "Winter 2: The Four Seasons, Violin Concerto in F minor Allegro"; 2. "Winter 3: The Four Seasons, Violin Concerto in F minor Allegro"; From The Four Seasons; Composed by Antonio Vivaldi; Choreo. by Galit Chait	"Nureyev": From The White Crow; Composed by Ilan Eshkeri; Performed by Lisa Batiashvili; Choreo. by Galit Chait
2026-27	Medley: 1. "L-O-V-E"; Performed by Nat King Cole; 2. "I'm Gonna Live Till I Die"; Performed by Frank Sinatra; Choreo. by Galit Chait	Medley: 1. Carmen Suite; 2. Naughty Limericks; 3. The Chimes; Composed by Rodion Shchedrin; Choreo. by Galit Chait

== Technique ==
He is capable of performing three types of quadruple jumps—Lutz, Salchow, and toe loop—as well as all triple jumps.

His quadruple Lutz was first successfully landed at the 2025 Denkova–Staviski Cup, unofficially recognized by the ISU. He landed the quadruple Salchow for the first time in an ISU-recognized competition at the 2025 World Junior Championships, and the quadruple toe loop at the 2024 JGP Czech Skate, marking the first successful attempt in an ISU-recognized event

== Competitive highlights ==
- CS – Event of the ISU Challenger Series
- JGP – Event of the ISU Junior Grand Prix Series
- TBD - assigned to compete at event
- WD - withdrew from competition

Competition placements at senior level
Season	2024–25	2025–26	2026–27
World Championships		18th	
European Championships		7th	
Israeli Championships		1st	
GP Skate America			3rd
GP Finlandia Trophy			10th
CS Cranberry Cup		4th	
CS Golden Spin of Zagreb		15th	
CS Warsaw Cup		6th	
CS Budapest Trophy			7th
Skate to Milano		10th	
Denkova-Staviski Cup	1st		
Crystal Skate			1st

Competition placements at junior level
Season	2021–22	2022–23	2023–24	2024–25
World Junior Championships			19th	12th
Israeli Championships	1st	1st	1st	1st
JGP Armenia			5th	
JGP Czech Republic				4th
JGP Poland		21st		4th
JGP Thailand			7th	
Bavarian Open			2nd	1st
Cranberry Cup				6th
Denkova-Staviski Cup				1st
Diamond Spin				1st
EduSport Trophy		3rd		
NRW Trophy				1st
Open d'Andorra		1st		
Philadelphia Summer		4th		
Santa Claus Cup			1st	3rd
Skate Berlin				2nd
Tallink Hotels Cup		2nd		
Volvo Open Cup	5th			

== Detailed results ==
ISU personal best scores in the +5/-5 GOE System
Segment	Type	Score	Event
Total	TSS	248.55	2026 Skate America
Short program	TSS	83.13	2026 Skate America
Short program	TES	45.62	2026 Skate America
Short program	PCS	37.51	2026 Skate America
Free skating	TSS	165.42	2026 Skate America
Free skating	TES	89.39	2026 Skate America
Free skating	PCS	76.03	2026 Skate America

=== Senior level ===
Results in the 2025–26 season
Date	Event	SP		FS		Total	
Date	Event	P	Score	P	Score	P	Score
Aug 7–10, 2025	(United States) 2025 CS Cranberry Cup International	4	75.04	5	146.83	4	211.87
Sep 18–21, 2025	(China) 2025 ISU Skate to Milano	16	63.82	8	137.78	10	201.60
Nov 7–9, 2025	(Bulgaria) 2025 Denkova-Staviski Cup	1	65.50	2	116.10	1	181.60
Nov 19–23, 2025	(Poland) 2025 CS Warsaw Cup	5	73.14	10	126.96	6	200.10
Dec 3–6, 2025	(Croatia) 2025 CS Golden Spin of Zagreb	5	78.08	17	114.38	15	192.46
Dec 10–11, 2025	(Israel) 2026 Israeli Championships	1	73.94	1	149.92	1	223.86
Jan 15–17, 2026	(United Kingdom) 2026 European Championships	7	79.82	7	150.35	7	230.17
Feb 17-21, 2026	(Germany) 2026 Skate Berlin International	3	78.47	2	138.07	2	216.54
Mar 24–29, 2026	(Czech Republic) 2026 World Championships	19	76.63	18	147.77	18	224.40

Results in the 2026–27 season
Date	Event	SP		FS		Total	
Date	Event	P	Score	P	Score	P	Score
Oct 15-18, 2026	(Hungary) 2026 CS Budapest Trophy	8	74.41	8	136.60	7	211.01
Nov 13-15, 2026	(United States) 2026 Skate America	7	83.13	3	165.42	3	248.55

=== Junior level ===
2024–25 season
Date	Event	SP	FS	Total
Feb 24 – Mar 2, 2025	2025 World Junior Championships	17; 68.17	10; 141.32	12; 209.49
Jan 20–26, 2025	2025 Bavarian Open	1; 76.01	1; 141.52	1; 217.53
Nov 27 – Dec 2, 2024	2024 Santa Claus Cup	1; 76.56	8; 103.92	3; 180.48
Nov 12–17, 2024	2024 NRW Trophy	1; 75.13	1; 132.70	1; 207.83
Oct 15–20, 2024	2024 Diamond Spin	1; 65.12	1; 113.86	1; 178.98
Sep 25–28, 2024	2024 JGP Poland	2; 75.58	4; 119.80	4; 195.38
Sep 4–7, 2024	2024 JGP Czech Republic	4; 72.75	3; 127.72	4; 210.47
Aug 8–11, 2024	2024 CS Cranberry Cup International	9; 63.64	7; 125.63	6; 189.27
2023–24 season
Date	Event	SP	FS	Total
Feb 26 – Mar 3, 2024	2024 World Junior Championships	20; 63.60	20; 119.23	19; 182.83
Jan 30 – Feb 4, 2024	2024 Bavarian Open	3; 66.93	1; 123.24	2; 190.17
Nov 29 – Dec 4, 2023	2023 Santa Claus Cup	1; 64.82	1; 128.47	1; 193.29
Nov 7–12, 2023	2023 Denkova-Staviski Cup	1; 70.09	1; 131.06	1; 201.15
Oct 4–7, 2023	2023 JGP Armenia	6; 59.90	5; 120.52	5; 180.42
Aug 23–26, 2023	2023 JGP Thailand	10; 63.39	8; 118.06	7; 178.45
