= Mark Gorodnitsky =

Israeli figure skater

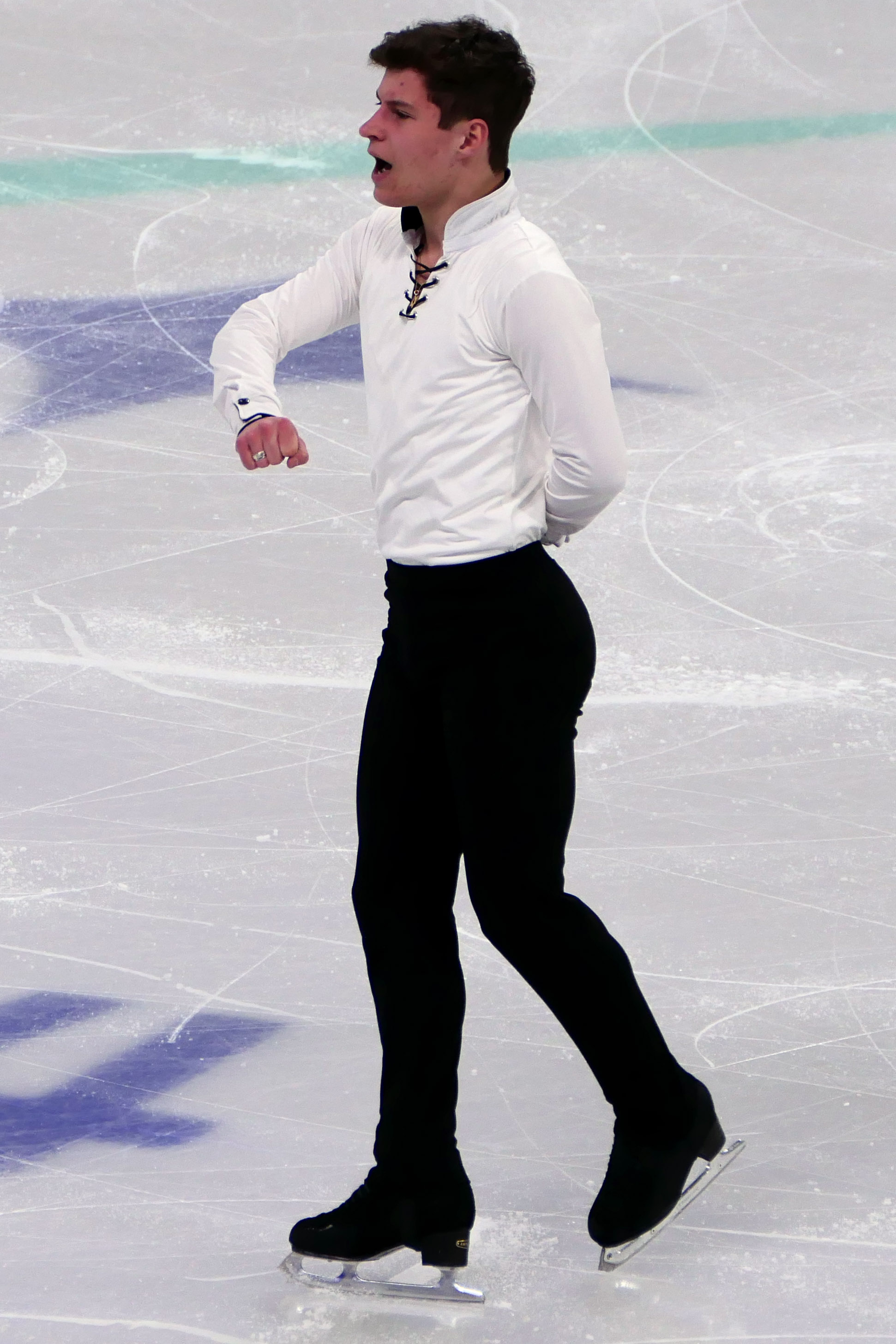
- Mark Gorodnitsky at the 2024 World Championships

Personal information
- Native name: מארק גורודניצקי
- Born: March 23, 2001 (age 25) Richmond Hill, Ontario, Canada
- Height: 1.71 m (5 ft 7 1/2 in)

Figure skating career
- Country: Israel
- Discipline: Men's singles
- Coach: Andrei Berezintsev; Inga Zusev
- Skating club: Ice Peaks Holon
- Began skating: 2005

Medal record
Israeli Championships
Gold medal – first place	2020 Holon	Singles
Gold medal – first place	2022 Holon	Singles
Gold medal – first place	2023 Holon	Singles
Gold medal – first place	2024 Holon	Singles
Silver medal – second place	2025 Holon	Singles
Bronze medal – third place	2017 Holon	Singles
Bronze medal – third place	2019 Holon	Singles

Mark Gorodnitsky (Hebrew: מארק גורודניצקי; born March 23, 2001) is an Israeli figure skater. He is the 2023 CS Warsaw Cup silver medalist, 2023 CS Nepela Memorial bronze medalist, and a four-time Israeli national champion (2020, 2022–24).

== Personal life ==
Gorodnitsky was born on March 23, 2001, in Richmond Hill, Ontario, Canada to a Latvian mother and Belarusian father. His sister, Maya, who is three years younger, has also competed in figure skating for Israel on the international junior level.

Gorodnitsky graduated from Richmond Green Secondary School in 2019, where he was part of the high performance athlete program.

== Career ==
=== Early career ===
Gorodnitsky began learning to skate in 2005 at around the age of four, and has been coached by Andrei Berezintsev and Inga Zusev at the Richmond Training Centre in Richmond Hill, Ontario since the age of five.

Due to Gorodnitsky's father, Dmitry, having previously lived in Israel for eight years, the Israel Ice Skating Federation reached out to Gorodnitsky's parents when Gorodnitsky was fourteen years old, asking if he would be interested in competing for Israel. Ultimately, Gorodnitsky agreed to the request.

=== 2015–16 season: Junior debut ===
He debuted on the ISU Junior Grand Prix series in October 2015 at the 2015 JGP Croatia, placing twentieth. In February, he competed at the 2016 Winter Youth Olympics in Norway and finished 13th. He did not advance to the free skate at the 2016 World Junior Championships, held a month later in Debrecen, Hungary.

=== 2016–17 season: Senior international debut ===
Gorodnitsky began the season by placing tenth and fifteenth, respectively at the 2016 JGP Japan and the 2016 JGP Germany. He then placed sixth at the 2016 Santa Claus Cup.

At the 2016–17 Israeli Championships, Gorodnitsky won the bronze medal and was sent to compete at the 2017 European Championships in Ostrava, Czech Republic but did not advance to the free skate, finishing thirtieth overall. He went on to compete at the 2017 World Junior Championships in Taipei, Taiwan, finishing twenty-second overall.

=== 2017–18 season ===
Gorodnitsky started the season with a seventh-place finish at the 2017 JGP Austria and tenth-place finish at the 2017 JGP Poland. He also finished ninth at the 2017 CS Autumn Classic International.

He went on to win the gold medal at the 2017 Golden Spin of Zagreb on the junior level. At the 2017–18 Israeli Junior Championships, Gorodnitsky won the gold medal.

He then competed at the 2018 World Junior Championships in Sofia, Bulgaria, placing eighteenth in the short program, fourteenth in the free program, and fourteenth overall.

=== 2018–19 season ===
Gorodnitsky started the season competing at the 2018 JGP Austria and 2018 JGP Slovenia, placing seventh and sixth, respectively. He then placed ninth at the CS Autumn Classic International for the second year in a row.

Gorodnitsky went on to win his first senior international medal, taking silver at the Volvo Open Cup. At the 2018–19 Israeli Championships, Gorodnitsky won his second national bronze medal.

Competing at the 2019 World Junior Championships in Zagreb, Croatia, Gorodnitsky ranked fifteenth in the short program, eighteenth in the free skate, and seventeenth overall.

=== 2019–20 season: First Israeli national title ===
Gorodnitsky began his season competing on the Junior Grand Prix series, placing fifth at the 2019 JGP France and seventh at the 2019 JGP Croatia. He also competed at the 2019 CS Autumn Classic International, 2019 Denis Ten Memorial Challenge, and the 2019 CS Golden Spin of Zagreb, respectively finishing seventh, fifth, and twelfth.

At the 2019–20 Israeli Championships, Gorodnitsky won his first senior national title. He was then sent to compete at the 2020 European Championships in Graz, Austria, where he finished seventeenth.

=== 2020–21 season ===
Gorodnitsky was assigned to make his Grand Prix debut at the 2020 Skate Canada International, but the event was cancelled as a result of the coronavirus pandemic. He did not compete for the rest of the reason.

=== 2021–22 season: World Championships debut ===
Gorodnitsky began his season with an eleventh-place finish at the 2021 Cranberry Cup. He then went on to place eighth at the 2021 U.S. Classic, twentieth at the 2021 CS Warsaw Cup, and fifteenth at the 2021 CS Golden Spin of Zagreb.

At the 2021–22 Israeli Championships, Gorodnitsky won his second national title.

Although assigned to compete at the 2022 European Championships in Tallinn, Estonia, Gorodnitsky ultimately withdrew from the event due to his coach testing positive for COVID-19. At the 2022 International Challenge Cup, Gorodnitsky finished fourth.

Making his World Championships debut in Montpellier, France, Gorodnitsky placed twenty-fifth in the short program, failing to advance to the free skate.

=== 2022–23 season ===
Gorodnitsky started the season by winning gold at the 2022 Cranberry Cup International. He went on to finish fourth at the 2022 CS U.S. Classic, ninth at the 2022 CS Warsaw Cup, and sixth at the 2022 CS Golden Spin of Zagreb.

At the 2022–23 Israeli Championships, Gorodnitsky won his third national title.

Competing at the 2023 European Championships in Espoo, Finland, Gorodnitsky finished thirteenth. He then went on to place sixth at the 2023 International Challenge Cup. At the 2023 World Championships in Saitama, Japan, Gorodnitsky skated a career best short and free program, ultimately finishing sixteenth at the event.

=== 2023–24 season: Grand Prix debut ===
Gorodnitsky began the season by winning the gold medal at the 2023 Cranberry Cup International for a second consecutive time. Given two Challenger assignments, he came sixth at the 2023 CS Autumn Classic International before winning the bronze medal at the 2023 CS Nepela Memorial. Appearing on the Grand Prix, Gorodnitsky came sixth at the 2023 Skate Canada International. He went on to win the silver medal at the 2023 CS Warsaw Cup behind Lukas Britschgi of Switzerland, earning personal best scores in all competition segments.

In the second half of the season, Gorodnitsky finished twelfth at both the European and World Championships.

=== 2024–25 season ===
Gorodnitsky opened his season finishing seventh at the 2024 Nebelhorn Trophy. In his two Grand Prix assignments, he finished tenth at Skate Canada, and eleventh at the NHK Trophy.

Competing at the 2024 Golden Spin, Mark finished in seventh place.

Gorodnitsky finished his season by finishing second and winning the silver medal at the 2025 Israeli Championships, followed by a third-place finish at Challenge Cup.

=== 2025–26 season ===
Mark opened his season with an eleventh-place finish at the 2025 Cranberry Cup.

In October, he finished fifth at the Swiss Open.

=== 2026–27 season ===
Gorodnitsky opened the new season by winning the bronze medal at the 2026 Cranberry Cup. In September, he placed 8th at the 2026 Kinoshita Group Cup.

== Programs ==
Season	Short program	Free skating
2026–2027	Toccata by Johan Sebastian Bach	Now We Are Free (from "Gladiator") by Hans Zimmer, Lisa Gerrad
2025–2026	Uninvited Guest by Disturbed choreo. by Andrei Berezintsev	Now We Are Free (from Gladiator) by Hans Zimmer & Lisa Gerrard performed by Il Volo choreo. by Andrei Berezintsev
2024–2025	I - A COLORS SHOW by Sofiane Pamart choreo. by Andrei Berezintsev	Devil May Cry by Apashe & Sofiane Pamart; Dies Irae by Apashe ft. Black Prez choreo. by Andrei Berezintsev
2023–2024	Moonlight Sonata by Ludwig van Beethoven performed by Marcin Patrzalek choreo. by Andrei Berezintsev, Inga Zusev	Shape of Lies; True Love's Last Kiss by Eternal Eclipse choreo. by Andrei Berezintsev, Inga Zusev
2022–2023	Follow Your Heart by Scorpions choreo. by Andrei Berezintsev, Inga Zusev	Shape of Lies; True Love's Last Kiss by Eternal Eclipse choreo. by Andrei Berezintsev, Inga Zusev
2021–2022	Ricordami by Il Volo, Natalia Jiménez, & Armando Avila choreo. by Andrei Berezintsev, Inga Zusev	Bull Run (from Knight and Day) by John Powell choreo. by Andrei Berezintsev, Inga Zusev
2020–2021	Did not compete this season	
2019–2020	Stop It (I Like It) by Rick Guard choreo. by Andrei Berezintsev	Bull Run (from Knight and Day) by John Powell choreo. by Andrei Berezintsev, Inga Zusev; Burnt by the Sun by Sophie Solomon choreo. by Andrei Berezintsev
2018–2019	Quando l'amore diventa poesia by Mogol, Piero Soffici performed by Il Volo choreo. by Andrei Berezintsev	Stop! by Sam Brown performed by Joe Bonamassa choreo. by Andrei Berezintsev
2017–2018	Diego, libre dans sa tête by Michel Berger performed by Johnny Hallyday Band choreo. by Andrei Berezintsev	Per Te performed by Josh Groban choreo. by Andrei Berezintsev
2016–2017	Puttin' On the Pin-Stripe Remix A by Chris Walden, Mark Kilian choreo. by Andrei Berezintsev	Iron Man 3 by Brian Tyler choreo. by Andrei Berezintsev
2015–2016	Megapolis by Evgeni Sokolovski performed by Bel Suono choreo. by Andrei Berezintsev	Lonely Heart by Evgeni Sokolovski performed by Bel Suono choreo. by Andrei Berezintsev

== Competitive highlights ==
- GP – Event of the ISU Grand Prix Series
- JGP – Event of the ISU Junior Grand Prix Series
- CS – Event of the ISU Challenger Series
- TBD – Assigned
- WD – Withdrew from competition

Competition placements at senior level
Season	2016–17	2017–18	2018–19	2019–20	2021–22	2022–23	2023–24	2024–25	2025–26	2026–27
World Championships					25th	16th	12th			
European Championships	30th			17th		13th	12th			
Israeli Championships	3rd		3rd	1st	1st	1st	1st	2nd		
GP Skate Canada							6th	10th		
GP NHK Trophy								11th		
CS Autumn Classic		9th	9th	7th			6th			
CS Cranberry Cup					11th	1st	1st		11th	3rd
CS Golden Spin of Zagreb				12th	15th	6th		7th		
CS Nebelhorn Trophy								7th		
CS Nepela Memorial							3rd			
CS U.S. Classic					8th	4th				
CS Warsaw Cup					20th	9th	2nd			
CS Kinoshita Group Cup										8th
Challenge Cup					4th	6th		3rd		
Bavarian Open							6th			
Denis Ten Memorial				5th						
Santa Claus Cup	6th									
Volvo Open Cup			2nd							
Tayside Trophy			2nd							2nd

Competition placements at junior level
Season	2015–16	2016–17	2017–18	2018–19	2019–20
Winter Youth Olympics	13th				
World Junior Championships	34th	22nd	14th	17th	21st
Israeli Championships			1st		
JGP Austria			5th	7th	
JGP Croatia	20th				7th
JGP France					5th
JGP Germany		15th			
JGP Japan		10th			
JGP Poland			10th		
JGP Slovenia				6th	
Autumn Classic		2nd			
Golden Spin of Zagreb			1st		
Open Ice Mall Cup				2nd	

== Detailed results ==
ISU personal best scores in the +5/-5 GOE System
Segment	Type	Score	Event
Total	TSS	243.29	2023 CS Warsaw Cup
Short program	TSS	82.06	2023 CS Warsaw Cup
Short program	TES	43.64	2023 CS Warsaw Cup
Short program	PCS	38.42	2023 CS Warsaw Cup
Free skating	TSS	162.76	2024 World Championships
Free skating	TES	83.54	2024 World Championships
Free skating	PCS	79.22	2024 World Championships

ISU personal best scores in the +3/-3 GOE System
Segment	Type	Score	Event
Total	TSS	186.02	2017 CS Autumn Classic International
Short program	TSS	61.72	2018 World Junior Championships
Short program	TES	33.69	2018 World Junior Championships
Short program	PCS	28.50	2017 CS Autumn Classic International
Free skating	TSS	125.50	2017 CS Autumn Classic International
Free skating	TES	63.60	2017 CS Autumn Classic International
Free skating	PCS	61.90	2017 CS Autumn Classic International

=== Senior level ===
Results in the 2016–17 season
Date	Event	SP		FS		Total	
Date	Event	P	Score	P	Score	P	Score
Dec 6–11, 2016	(Hungary) 2016 Santa Claus Cup	7	54.37	7	104.87	6	159.24
Jan 25–29, 2017	(Czech Republic) 2017 European Championships	30	51.72	—N/a	—N/a	30	51.72

Results in the 2017–18 season
Date	Event	SP		FS		Total	
Date	Event	P	Score	P	Score	P	Score
Sep 20–23, 2017	(Canada) 2017 CS Autumn Classic International	10	60.52	9	125.50	9	186.02

Results in the 2018–19 season
Date	Event	SP		FS		Total	
Date	Event	P	Score	P	Score	P	Score
Sep 20–22, 2018	(Canada) 2018 CS Autumn Classic International	9	63.10	9	123.96	9	187.06
Nov 6–11, 2018	(Latvia) 2018 Volvo Open Cup	4	65.92	2	134.24	2	200.16

Results in the 2019–20 season
Date	Event	SP		FS		Total	
Date	Event	P	Score	P	Score	P	Score
Sep 12–14, 2019	(Canada) 2019 CS Autumn Classic International	7	67.12	7	122.40	7	189.52
Oct 9–12, 2019	(Kazakhstan) 2019 Denis Ten Memorial Challenge	5	69.89	6	125.45	5	195.34
Dec 4–7, 2019	(Croatia) 2019 CS Golden Spin of Zagreb	6	74.61	14	126.10	12	200.71
Dec 11–12, 2019	(Israel) 2020 Israeli Championships	2	85.29	1	154.78	1	240.07
Jan 20–26, 2020	(Austria) 2020 European Championships	12	76.20	17	130.63	17	206.83

Results in the 2021–22 season
Date	Event	SP		FS		Total	
Date	Event	P	Score	P	Score	P	Score
Aug 11–15, 2021	(United States) 2021 Cranberry Cup International	11	55.23	9	110.86	11	166.09
Sep 14–17, 2021	(United States) 2021 U.S. International Classic	9	64.24	8	122.58	8	186.82
Nov 17–20, 2021	(Poland) 2021 CS Warsaw Cup	21	63.90	18	123.98	20	187.88
Dec 7–11, 2021	(Croatia) 2021 CS Golden Spin of Zagreb	16	66.66	15	137.96	15	204.62
Dec 15–16, 2021	(Israel) 2022 Israeli Championships	1	82.62	1	144.08	1	226.70
Feb 24–27, 2022	(Netherlands) 2022 International Challenge Cup	4	78.59	4	143.73	4	222.32
Mar 21–27, 2022	(France) 2022 World Championships	25	69.70	—N/a	—N/a	25	69.70

Results in the 2022–23 season
Date	Event	SP		FS		Total	
Date	Event	P	Score	P	Score	P	Score
Aug 8–11, 2022	(United States) 2022 Cranberry Cup International	3	69.83	1	150.00	1	219.83
Sep 12–16, 2022	(United States) 2022 CS U.S. International Classic	2	77.65	5	141.18	4	218.83
Nov 17–20, 2022	(Poland) 2022 CS Warsaw Cup	14	67.44	7	134.86	9	202.30
Dec 7–10, 2022	(Croatia) 2022 CS Golden Spin of Zagreb	4	71.93	7	131.49	6	203.42
Dec 14–15, 2022	(Israel) 2023 Israeli Championships	1	82.64	1	149.43	1	232.07
Jan 25–29, 2023	(Finland) 2023 European Championships	22	64.94	9	137.40	13	202.34
Feb 23–26, 2023	(Netherlands) 2023 International Challenge Cup	5	77.21	8	136.89	6	214.10
Mar 22–26, 2023	(Japan) 2023 World Championships	14	77.89	16	154.24	16	232.13

Results in the 2023–24 season
Date	Event	SP		FS		Total	
Date	Event	P	Score	P	Score	P	Score
Aug 9–13, 2023	(United States) 2023 Cranberry Cup International	2	76.29	2	154.70	1	230.99
Sep 14–17, 2023	(Canada) 2023 CS Autumn Classic International	5	73.46	6	139.66	6	213.12
Sep 28–30, 2023	(Slovakia) 2023 CS Nepela Memorial	4	80.55	3	155.75	3	236.30
Oct 27–29, 2023	2023 Skate Canada International	11	70.69	6	154.66	6	225.35
Nov 16–19, 2023	(Poland) 2023 CS Warsaw Cup	2	82.06	1	161.23	2	243.29
Jan 10–14, 2024	(Lithuania) 2024 European Championships	9	77.50	13	140.06	12	217.56
Jan 30 – Feb 4, 2024	(Germany) 2024 Bavarian Open	8	66.73	4	141.75	6	208.48
Mar 18–24, 2024	(Canada) 2024 World Championships	14	80.49	10	162.76	12	243.25
Apr 3–4, 2024	(Israel) 2024 Israeli Championships	1	84.29	1	153.87	1	238.16

Results in the 2024–25 season
Date	Event	SP		FS		Total	
Date	Event	P	Score	P	Score	P	Score
Sep 19–21, 2024	(Germany) 2024 CS Nebelhorn Trophy	4	74.04	9	139.23	7	213.27
Oct 25–27, 2024	2024 Skate Canada International	11	71.79	8	141.62	10	213.41
Nov 8–10, 2024	(Japan) 2024 NHK Trophy	9	77.74	10	138.02	11	215.76
Dec 4–7, 2024	(Croatia) 2024 CS Golden Spin of Zagreb	7	72.55	10	127.31	7	199.86
Dec 11–12, 2024	(Israel) 2025 Israeli Championships	2	79.43	2	152.66	2	232.09
Feb 13-16 2025	(Netherlands) 2025 Challenge Cup	2	67.60	3	110.01	3	177.61

Results in the 2025–26 season
Date	Event	SP		FS		Total	
Date	Event	P	Score	P	Score	P	Score
Aug 7–10, 2025	(United States) 2025 CS Cranberry Cup International	15	58.49	6	134.59	11	193.08

Results in the 2026–27 season
Date	Event	SP		FS		Total	
Date	Event	P	Score	P	Score	P	Score
Aug 5–9, 2026	(United States) 2026 Cranberry Cup	2	80.99	4	122.32	3	203.31
Sept 4–6, 2026	(Japan) 2026 Kinoshita Group Cup	4	76.71	8	141.96	8	218.67

=== Junior level ===
Results in the 2015–16 season
Date	Event	SP		FS		Total	
Date	Event	P	Score	P	Score	P	Score
Oct 7–10, 2015	2015 JGP Croatia	23	31.73	16	80.26	20	111.99
Feb 12–21, 2016	(Norway) 2016 Winter Youth Olympics	12	44.48	12	91.30	13	135.78
Mar 14–20, 2016	(Hungary) 2016 World Junior Championships	34	45.28	—N/a	—N/a	34	45.28

Results in the 2016–17 season
Date	Event	SP		FS		Total	
Date	Event	P	Score	P	Score	P	Score
Sep 8–11, 2016	2016 JGP Japan	11	55.19	11	109.86	11	165.05
Sep 28 – Oct 1, 2016	(Canada) 2016 Autumn Classic International	2	55.57	1	107.61	2	163.18
Oct 5–8, 2016	2016 JGP Germany	17	49.70	14	102.09	15	151.79
Mar 15–19, 2017	(Taiwan) 2017 World Junior Championships	22	59.27	21	111.32	22	170.59

Results in the 2017–18 season
Date	Event	SP		FS		Total	
Date	Event	P	Score	P	Score	P	Score
Aug 30 – Sep 2, 2017	2017 JGP Austria	9	56.57	4	120.62	5	177.19
Oct 4–7, 2017	2017 JGP Poland	13	56.96	9	118.33	10	175.29
Dec 6–9, 2017	(Croatia) 2017 Golden Spin of Zagreb	2	59.29	1	116.86	1	176.15
Mar 5–11, 2018	(Bulgaria) 2018 World Junior Championships	18	61.72	14	118.71	14	180.43

Results in the 2018–19 season
Date	Event	SP		FS		Total	
Date	Event	P	Score	P	Score	P	Score
Aug 29 – Sep 1, 2018	2018 JGP Austria	6	68.47	9	110.35	7	178.82
Oct 3–6, 2018	2018 JGP Slovenia	2	74.66	6	130.53	6	205.19
Feb 20–23, 2019	(Israel) 2019 Open Ice Mall Cup	2	68.71	2	128.95	2	197.66
Mar 4–10, 2019	(Croatia) 2019 World Junior Championships	15	69.22	18	116.40	17	185.62

Results in the 2019–20 season
Date	Event	SP		FS		Total	
Date	Event	P	Score	P	Score	P	Score
Aug 21–24, 2019	2019 JGP France	5	66.32	5	124.43	5	190.75
Sep 25–28, 2019	2019 JGP Croatia	9	66.11	8	126.45	7	192.56
Mar 2–8, 2020	(Estonia) 2020 World Junior Championships	23	57.96	20	110.94	21	168.90
