= Natalia Dubova =

Russian-American ice dancer (born 1948)

Personal information
- Full name: Natalia Ilinichna Dubova
- Other names: Natalia Ilinichna Bakh
- Born: 31 March 1948 (age 78) Moscow, Russian SFSR, Soviet Union

Figure skating career
- Retired: 1969

Natalia Ilinichna Dubova (Russian: Наталья Ильинична Дубова; born 31 March 1948) is a Russian-American ice dancing coach and former competitive ice dancer.

== Career ==
Competing as Natalia Bakh with partner Vladimir Pavlikhin, she won the bronze medal at the 1965 Soviet Championships. In 1969, she began coaching at the Sokolniki Arena in Moscow. In September 1992, she moved to Lake Placid, New York. She has coached the following ice dance teams:

- Marina Klimova / Sergei Ponomarenko (from 1979 to 1991)
- Maya Usova / Alexander Zhulin (from 1980 to 1994)
- Oksana Grishuk / Evgeny Platov (from mid-1989 to mid-1992)
- Tatiana Navka / Samuel Gezalian
- Zhang Weina / Cao Xianming
- Elizaveta Stekolnikova / Dmitri Kazarlyga
- Galit Chait / Sergei Sakhnovski
- Shae-Lynn Bourne / Victor Kraatz
- Siobhan Heekin-Canedy / Alexander Shakalov
- Jenette Maitz / Alper Ucar

Dubova was also a consultant for Marina Anissina / Gwendal Peizerat during the 2001–02 season.

She was awarded the Order of the Badge of Honour and the Medal "For Distinguished Labour". She was also granted the title of Honored Artist of Russian Federation.

== Personal life ==
Dubova is Jewish. She met her husband, Semyon Belits-Geiman, a former Olympic swimming medalist, when he came to one of her competitions as a sportswriter. In 1999, they moved to Stamford, Connecticut.
