= Daria Zuravicki =

Israeli-American figure skater

Darya Zuravicki
Personal information
- Native name: דריה זורביצקי
- Other names: Darya Zuravicky
- Born: April 14, 1985 (age 41) Albany, New York, United States

Figure skating career
- Country: Israel
- Discipline: Women's singles
- Retired: 2003
Israeli Championships
Gold medal – first place	2001 Metula	Singles
Gold medal – first place	2002 Metula	Singles

Daria Zuravicki or Darya Zuravicky (Hebrew: דריה זורביצקי; born April 14, 1985, in Albany) is an American former competitive figure skater who competed internationally for Israel. She is the 2001–02 Israeli national champion and was the first skater to represent Israel in the ladies event at an ISU Championship, which she achieved at the 2001 European Figure Skating Championships. Zuravicki was coached by Galina Zmievskaya in Simsbury, Connecticut. She later switched back to competing for the United States but never appeared internationally.

== Programs ==
Season	Short program	Free skating
2000–02	Por una cabeza by Carlos Gardel	The Blizzard by Georgy Sviridov

== Competitive highlights ==
JGP: Junior Grand Prix

International
Event	2000–01	2001–02	2002–03
World Champ.	45th	33rd	
European Champ.	28th	29th	
Finlandia Trophy			11th
Golden Spin		10th	
Pajović Cup		3rd	
Skate Israel	2nd		
International: Junior
JGP United States			11th
National
Israeli Champ.	1st	1st	
