= Tamar Katz =

Personal information
- Native name: תמר כץ
- Born: September 26, 1988 (age 37) Dallas, Texas, United States
- Height: 1.63 m (5 ft 4 in)

Figure skating career
- Country: Israel
- Skating club: Metula FSC
- Began skating: 1999
- Retired: 2010

Tamar Katz (Hebrew: תמר כץ; born September 26, 1988) is an Israeli-American former competitive figure skater. She is the 2005, 2007, and 2008 Israeli national champion.

== Personal life ==
Katz was born September 26, 1988, in Dallas, Texas. The daughter of Leora and Yirmi Katz, she was raised with two brothers, Eyal and Ronen. Due to her father's work as a diplomat at the Israeli Embassy in Washington, D.C., she resided in Maryland from the age of seven, before settling in Metula, Israel when she was 13. At age 15, she returned to the United States for training opportunities. She began college studies at the University of Pennsylvania in 2010.

In September 2010, her brother, Ronen, was killed in a hit and run accident in New York City.

== Career ==
Katz began skating as an extracurricular activity at the age of 9 and became more serious about skating a year later. She trained in Rockville, Maryland, until she was 13, followed by Metula, Israel until age 15, and then in the United States again.

Katz's best season was 2006–07. She won a silver medal at the 2006 Golden Spin of Zagreb, finished a career-best 13th at the 2007 European Championships, and qualified for the free skate at the 2007 World Championships.

In 2008, Katz was 16th at the Europeans and 22nd at Worlds. She sustained a stress fracture to her right foot and a broken hand in December 2008 and missed the 2009 European Championships. She finished 25th at the 2009 World Championships. She was coached by Peter Burrows in Monsey, New York.

Katz qualified a spot for Israel in ladies' figure skating at the 2010 Olympics with her 12th-place finish at the 2009 Nebelhorn Trophy; she was the first Israeli ladies' single skater to qualify for an Olympics. However, suffering from a virus, she had a poor showing at the 2010 European Championships, failing to meet the Israeli Olympic committee's criterion of finishing in the top 14 at the event. Katz appealed this decision with the support of the Israeli Ice Skating Federation, but was unsuccessful. The Israeli Olympic Committee ceded the Olympic spot to the alternate, Australian skater Cheltzie Lee. Katz stated that "The Israeli Olympic Committee said that they want medals and that I can compete in 2014. What they don't understand is that if they want me to medal at 2014, the crucial exposure and experience that this Olympics would have given me has been taken away." She competed at the 2010 World Championships, but did not qualify for the free skate. During the 2009–10 season, she was coached by Burrows, Mary-Lynn Gelderman, and Galit Chait at Sport-o-Rama in Monsey, New York and then by Mark Mitchell and Peter Johansson in Boston, Massachusetts.

== Programs ==
Season	Short program	Free skating
2010–2011	Leyenda by Vanessa-Mae choreo. by Jamie Isley	Scheherazade by Nikolai Rimsky-Korsakov choreo. by Mark Mitchell
2009–2010	Gone with the Wind by Max Steiner	Rhapsody in Blue by George Gershwin choreo. by Lea Ann Miller
2008–2009	Gone with the Wind by Max Steiner	Concerto in F by George Gershwin choreo. by Lea Ann Miller
2007–2008	Malagueña by Ernesto Lecuona	Schindler's List by John Williams choreo. by Nikolai Morozov
2006–2007	Malagueña by Ernesto Lecuona	The Wizard of Oz; Papa, Can You Hear Me? by Michel Legrand choreo. by Nina Petrenko
2005–2006	Spanish medley	Doctor Zhivago by Maurice Jarre performed by German Philharmonic Orchestra
2004–2005	Romeo and Juliet Ouverture by P. I. Tchaikovsky	Doctor Zhivago by Maurice Jarre performed by German Philharmonic Orchestra
2003–2004	Most Lazy Girl in the World by Eugen Doga	Doctor Zhivago by Maurice Jarre performed by German Philharmonic Orchestra
2002–2003	My Affectionate and Tender Beast by Eugen Doga	Doctor Zhivago by Maurice Jarre

== Competitive highlights ==
JGP: Junior Grand Prix

International
Event	2002–03	2003–04	2004–05	2005–06	2006–07	2007–08	2008–09	2009–10
Worlds			16th QR		23rd	22nd	25th	27th
Europeans					13th	16th		21st
Nebelhorn								12th
Golden Spin					2nd			5th
Karl Schäfer							4th	
Merano Cup								4th
Skate Israel				4th				
International: Junior
Junior Worlds			22nd					
JGP Bulgaria						9th		
JGP Croatia						16th		
JGP Germany	10th		12th					
JGP Japan				12th				
JGP Romania			8th					
EYOF			9th					
National
Israeli Champ.	2nd J.		1st					
J. = Junior level; QR = Qualifying round

== See also ==
- List of select Jewish figure skaters
