= Siobhan Heekin-Canedy =

American-Ukrainian ice dancer (born 1991)

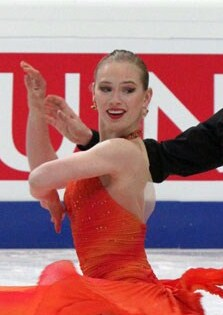
- Heekin-Canedy in 2011.

Personal information
- Born: July 31, 1991 (age 34) Beverly Hills, California, U.S.
- Height: 5 ft 5 in (1.65 m)

Figure skating career
- Country: Ukraine
- Coach: Galit Chait, Alexei Gorshkov, Igor Shpilband, T. Myles
- Skating club: Lider Kyiv
- Began skating: 1996
- Retired: March 2014

Siobhan Heekin-Canedy (born July 31, 1991) is an American-Ukrainian former ice dancer who competed internationally for Ukraine. With Dmitri Dun, she is a three-time Ukrainian national champion and placed as high as 14th at the World Championships.

== Personal life ==
Heekin-Canedy became a Ukrainian citizen two months before the 2014 Winter Olympics.

== Career ==
Due to the scarcity of males in U.S. figure skating, Heekin-Canedy's coach arranged a partnership with a Ukrainian. Heekin-Canedy began competing for Ukraine with Dmitri Zyzak in 2007. After their split, she competed with Alexander Shakalov from 2009 to 2011. They were coached by Galit Chait and Natalia Dubova. Shakalov retired after the 2011 World Championships.

In mid-2011, Heekin-Canedy teamed up with Dmitri Dun. In their first season together, they won the Ukrainian national title and placed 15th at both the 2012 European Championships and 2012 World Championships.

In the 2012–13 season, Heekin-Canedy and Dun finished 12th at the 2013 European Championships and 14th at the 2013 World Championships. Their Worlds placement gave Ukraine a spot in the ice dancing event at the 2014 Winter Olympics.

Heekin-Canedy and Dun retired from competition in March 2014.

== Programs ==
=== With Dun ===
Season	Short dance	Free dance
2013–2014	Quickstep: That Man by Caro Emerald; Foxtrot: Speaking of Happiness by Gloria Lynne; Charleston: Pigalle by Patricia Kaes	El Tango de Roxanne (from Moulin Rouge!)
2012–2013	Marguerite Waltz by Charles Gounod; Irish Party in Third Class (John Ryan's Polka)	Orobroy; Tango Serenato de Schubert by Franz Schubert; Orobroy; Gypsy
2011–2012	A Mi Manera by Gustavo Santador, Turio Cremishini; La Vuelta by Elsten Torres, Fernando Osorio; A Mi Manera by Gustavo Santador, Turio Cremishini	Notre Dame de Paris by Riccardo Cocciante: Les Temps des Cathedrales; Les Sans-Papiers; La Monture; Danse Mon Esmeralda

=== With Shakalov ===
Season	Short dance	Free dance
2010–2011	Waltz: Desde el Alma by Rosita Melo; Tango: El Choclo by Ángel Villoldo	La Vie en rose; Padam Padam; Je Ne Regrette Rien by Édith Piaf; L'Arrestation by Christopher Gunning

=== With Zyzak ===
Season	Original dance	Free dance
2009–2010	Concierto de Aranjuez by Joaquín Rodrigo; Silia y el Tiempo by V. Amigo	Dark Eyes (Russian gypsy music)
2008–2009	Charleston: Laughing Clarinets; Blues: Lullaby of the Leaves by B. Petkere; Charleston: Laughing Clarinets	ABBA medley: Mamma Mia; Thank You for the Music; Money, Money, Money

== Competitive highlights ==
=== With Dun ===
Results
International
Event	2011–12	2012–13	2013–14
Olympics			24th
Worlds	15th	14th	
Europeans	15th	12th	23rd
GP Rostelecom Cup			8th
Cup of Nice	7th		
Golden Spin		3rd	
Ice Challenge	3rd		
Nebelhorn		6th	15th
NRW Trophy			5th
Pavel Roman		2nd	
Toruń Cup	2nd	1st	
Ukrainian Open			3rd
U.S. Classic		5th	
Winter Universiade			9th
National
Ukrainian Champ.	1st	1st	1st
Team events
Olympics			9th T 9th P
GP = Grand Prix; T = Team result; P = Personal result

=== With Shakalov ===
Results
International
Event	2009–10	2010–11
World Championships		15th
European Championships		11th
Cup of Nice		4th
Finlandia Trophy		6th
Mont Blanc Trophy	5th	4th
Nebelhorn Trophy		10th
Trophy of Lyon		3rd
National
Ukrainian Champ.	4th	1st

=== With Zyzak ===
Results
International
Event	2008–09	2009–10
JGP Czech Republic	9th	
JGP Germany		12th
JGP Mexico	6th	
NRW Trophy	3rd J.	
J. = Junior level; JGP = Junior Grand Prix
