= Vadim Akolzin =

Israeli pair skater

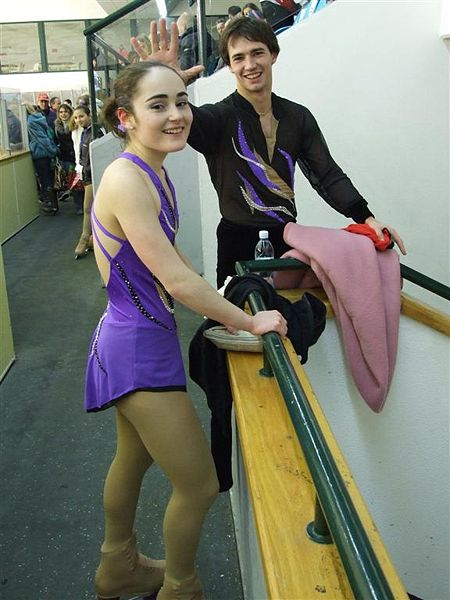
- Sacks and Akolzin at the 2008 Israeli Nationals.

Personal information
- Native name: ודים אקולזין
- Born: October 19, 1982 (age 44) Tver, Russian SFSR, Soviet Union
- Home town: Lake Arrowhead, California, United States
- Height: 1.75 m (5 ft 9 in)

Figure skating career
- Country: Israel
- Discipline: Pair skating
- Began skating: 1989
- Retired: 2009
Israeli Championships
Gold medal – first place	2003 Metula	Pairs
Gold medal – first place	2004 Metula	Pairs
Gold medal – first place	2005 Metula	Pairs
Silver medal – second place	2008 Metula	Pairs
Silver medal – second place	2009 Metula	Pairs
Bronze medal – third place	2001 Metula	Pairs
Bronze medal – third place	2002 Metula	Pairs

Vadim Akolzin (Hebrew: ודים אקולזין, Russian: Вадим Акользин; born October 19, 1982) is an Israeli former pair skater. He achieved his best ISU Championship result, tenth, at the 2005 European Championships with Julia Shapiro.

== Personal life ==
Vadim Akolzin was born in Tver in 1982 and moved to Israel in 1999.

== Career ==
Akolzin originally competed as a single skater for Israel. In 2002, he switched to pairs and began competing with Julia Shapiro. Shapiro/Akolzin were the 2003-2005 Israeli national pairs champions. Their partnership ended in 2005.

In 2007, Akolzin teamed up with Hayley Anne Sacks. They placed second in their first competition together, the Israel national championship, and then placed 17th at the 2008 World Championships. They parted ways after repeating as national silver medalists at the 2008–09 Israeli Championships.

== Programs ==
=== With Sacks ===
Season	Short program	Free skating
2007–2008	Scent of a Woman (soundtrack) performed by Itzhak Perlman	Spanish Tango by Raúl Di Blasio

=== With Shapiro ===
Season	Short program	Free skating
2004–2005	Luna de Paris by Raul di Blasio	Underground Tango by Goran Bregovic

=== Single skating ===
Season	Short program	Free skating
2001–2002	Music by Mark Knopfler	Tubular Bells by Robert Maels
2000–2001	Space by Yellow	Spanish folk music by Daniel Ortega

== Competitive highlights ==
=== With Sacks ===
Results
International
Event	2007–08	2008–09
World Championships	17th	
Nebelhorn Trophy		11th
National
Israeli Championships	2nd	2nd

=== With Shapiro ===
Results
International
Event	2002–03	2003–04	2004–05
World Champ.		16th	18th
European Champ.		15th	10th
GP Skate America			8th
GP Trophée Bompard			9th
Skate Israel		1st	
International: Junior
World Junior Champ.		13th	
JGP Poland		8th	
JGP Slovenia		8th	
National
Israeli Champ.	1st	1st	1st
JGP = Junior Grand Prix

=== Singles career ===
Results
International
Event	1999–2000	2000–2001	2001–2002
Skate Israel	15th	7th	
International: Junior
World Junior Champ.	31st	35th	
JGP Germany		17th	
JGP Italy			23rd
JGP Netherlands			18th
JGP Poland		17th	
Golden Bear		3rd	
National
Israeli Champ.	1st J.	3rd	3rd
JGP = Junior Grand Prix
