= Israeli Figure Skating Championships =

Recurring figure skating competition

- Status: Active
- Genre: National championships
- Frequency: Annual
- Venue: Holon Ice Arena
- Location: Holon
- Country: Israel
- Organiser: Israel Ice Skating Federation

The Israeli Figure Skating Championships are an annual figure skating competition organized by the Israel Ice Skating Federation to crown the national champions of Israel. Medals are awarded in men's singles, women's singles, pair skating, and ice dance at the senior, junior, and novice levels, although not every discipline may be held every year due to a lack of participants.

== Senior medalists ==
=== Men's singles ===
Men's event medalists
Year	Location	Gold	Silver	Bronze	Ref.
1992	Metula	Michael Shmerkin			
1993	Metula	Michael Shmerkin			
1994	Metula	Michael Shmerkin			
1995	Metula	Michael Shmerkin			
1996	Metula	Michael Shmerkin			
1997	Metula	Michael Shmerkin			
1998	Metula	Michael Shmerkin			
1999	Metula				
2000	Metula	Michael Shmerkin	Alex Gruber	Vadim Akolzin	
2001	Metula	Michael Shmerkin	Lior Hirsh	Vadim Akolzin	
2002	Metula	Michael Shmerkin	Sergei Kotov		
2003	Metula	Sergei Kotov	No other competitors		
2004	Metula	Roman Serov	Evgeni Krasnopolski	No other competitors	
2005	Metula	Roman Serov	Evgeni Krasnopolski	No other competitors	
2006	Metula				
2007	Metula	Maxim Shipov	No other competitors		
2008	Metula	Maxim Shipov	No other competitors		
2009	Metula	Maxim Shipov	Evgeni Krasnopolski	No other competitors	
2010					
2011					
2012					
2013					
2014					
2015		Daniel Samohin	Alexei Bychenko	No other competitors	
2016		Alexei Bychenko	Daniel Samohin	No other competitors	
2017		Alexei Bychenko	Daniel Samohin	Mark Gorodnitsky	
2018		Alexei Bychenko	Daniel Samohin	No other competitors	
2019		Daniel Samohin	Alexei Bychenko	Mark Gorodnitsky	
2020	Holon	Mark Gorodnitsky	Daniel Samohin	Alexei Bychenko	
2021	Holon	Competition cancelled due to the COVID-19 pandemic			
2022	Holon	Mark Gorodnitsky	Alexei Bychenko	Daniel Samohin	
2023	Holon	Mark Gorodnitsky	Lev Vinokur	No other competitors	
2024	Holon	Mark Gorodnitsky	No other competitors		
2025	Holon	Lev Vinokur	Mark Gorodnitsky	No other competitors	
2026	Holon	Tamir Kuperman	No other competitors		

=== Women's singles ===
Women's event medalists
Year	Location	Gold	Silver	Bronze	Ref.
2000	Metula	No women's competitors			
2001	Metula	Daria Zuravicki	No other competitors		
2002	Metula	Daria Zuravicki			
2003	Metula	Karen Shua-Haim	Tamar Katz	No other competitors	
2004	Metula	Karen Shua-Haim	No other competitors		
2005	Metula	Tamar Katz	Alicia Cohen	No other competitors	
2006	Metula				
2007	Metula				
2008	Metula	No women's competitors			
2009	Metula	Jenna Syken	No other competitors		
2015		Katerina Kulgeyko	Netta Schreiber	Aimee Buchanan	
2016		Katerina Kulgeyko	Aimee Buchanan	No other competitors	
2017		Aimee Buchanan	Elizaveta Yushchenko	Netta Scheiber	
2018		Michelle Lifshitz	Aimee Buchanan	Alena Ryvkina	
2019		Alena Ryvkina	No other competitors		
2020	Holon	Alina Iushchenkova	Nelli Yoffe	Taylor Morris	
2021	Holon	Competition cancelled due to the COVID-19 pandemic			
2022	Holon	Taylor Morris	No other competitors		
2023	Holon	Mariia Seniuk	Ella Chen	Elizabet Gervits	
2024	Holon	Mariia Seniuk	Elizabet Gervits	Julia Fennel	
2025	Holon	Mariia Seniuk	Julia Fennel	No other competitors	
2026	Holon	Mariia Seniuk	Maria Dmitrieva	Elizabet Gervits	

=== Pairs ===
Pairs event medalists
Year	Location	Gold	Silver	Bronze	Ref.
2000	Metula	Line Haddad; Vitali Lycenko	No other competitors		
2001	Metula	No pairs competitors			
2002	Metula				
2003	Metula	Julia Shapiro; Vadim Akolzin	No other competitors		
2004	Metula	Julia Shapiro; Vadim Akolzin	No other competitors		
2005	Metula	Julia Shapiro; Vadim Akolzin	No other competitors		
2006	Metula				
2007	Metula	Ekaterina Sozinova; Fedor Sokolov	Hayley Anne Sacks; Vadim Akolzin	No other competitors	
2008	Metula	Ekaterina Sozinova; Fedor Sokolov	Hayley Anne Sacks; Vadim Akolzin	No other competitors	
2009	Metula	Ekaterina Sozinova; Fedor Sokolov	Hayley Anne Sacks; Vadim Akolzin	No other competitors	
2015		Adel Tankova; Evgeni Krasnopolski	No other competitors		
2016		Adel Tankova; Evgeni Krasnopolski	No other competitors		
2017		No pairs competitors			
2018		Paige Conners; Evgeni Krasnopolski	No other competitors		
2019		Anna Vernikov; Evgeni Krasnopolski	No other competitors		
2020	Holon	Anna Vernikov; Evgeni Krasnopolski	No other competitors		
2021	Holon	Competition cancelled due to the COVID-19 pandemic			
2022	Holon	Hailey Kops; Evgeni Krasnopolski	No other competitors		
No pairs competitors since 2022

=== Ice dance ===
Ice dance event medalists
Year	Location	Gold	Silver	Bronze	Ref.
1995	Metula	Galit Chait; Sergei Sakhnovski			
1996	Metula	Galit Chait; Sergei Sakhnovski			
1997	Metula	Galit Chait; Sergei Sakhnovski			
1998	Metula	Galit Chait; Sergei Sakhnovski			
2000	Metula	Galit Chait; Sergei Sakhnovski	No other competitors		
2001	Metula	Galit Chait; Sergei Sakhnovski	Natalia Gudina; Alexei Beletski	No other competitors	
2002	Metula				
2003	Metula	Galit Chait; Sergei Sakhnovski	Natalia Gudina; Alexei Beletski	No other competitors	
2004	Metula	Galit Chait; Sergei Sakhnovski	Natalia Gudina; Alexei Beletski	No other competitors	
2005	Metula	Galit Chait; Sergei Sakhnovski	Natalia Gudina; Alexei Beletski	No other competitors	
2006	Metula	Galit Chait; Sergei Sakhnovski	Alexandra Zaretsky; Roman Zaretsky	No other competitors	
2007	Metula	Alexandra Zaretsky; Roman Zaretsky	No other competitors		
2008	Metula	Alexandra Zaretsky; Roman Zaretsky	No other competitors		
2009	Metula	Alexandra Zaretsky; Roman Zaretsky	No other competitors		
2015		Allison Reed; Vasili Rogov	Kimberly Berkovich; Ronald Zilberberg	No other competitors	
2016		Isabella Tobias; Ilia Tkachenko	Kimberly Berkovich; Ronald Zilberberg	No other competitors	
2017		Isabella Tobias; Ilia Tkachenko	Adel Tankova; Ronald Zilberberg	No other competitors	
2018		Adel Tankova; Ronald Zilberberg	No other competitors		
2019		Shira Ichilov; Vadim Davidovich	No other competitors		
2020	Holon	No ice dance competitors			
2021	Holon	Competition cancelled due to the COVID-19 pandemic			
2022	Holon	Mariia Nosovitskaya; Mikhail Nosovitskiy	Shira Ichilov; Volodymyr Byelikov	No other competitors	
2023	Holon	Elizabeth Tkachenko; Alexei Kiliakov	Mariia Nosovitskaya; Mikhail Nosovitskiy	No other competitors	
2024	Holon	Mariia Nosovitskaya; Mikhail Nosovitskiy	Shira Ichilov; Dmitry Kravchenko	No other competitors	
2025	Holon	Elizabeth Tkachenko; Alexei Kiliakov	Shira Ichilov; Dmitry Kravchenko	No other competitors	
2026	Holon	Shira Ichilov; Michael Nosovitsky	No other competitors		

== Junior medalists ==
=== Men's singles ===
Junior men's event medalists
Year	Location	Gold	Silver	Bronze	Ref.
2000	Metula	Vadim Akolzin	Sergei Kotov		
2001	Metula		Sergei Kotov		
2002	Metula				
2003	Metula		Evgeni Krasnopolski	Nazar Mahmud	
2004	Metula	Sergei Kotov	Yan Tales	Nazar Mahmud	
2005	Metula	Yan Tales	Nazar Mahmud		
2006	Metula	Evgeni Krasnopolski	Yan Tales	Nazar Mahmud	
2007	Metula				
2008	Metula	Evgeni Krasnopolski	Yan Tales	Ruslan Mahmud	
2009	Metula	No junior men's competitors			
2020	Holon	Lev Vinokur	Nikita Kovalenko	Yakov Pogribinski	
2021	Holon	Competition cancelled due to the COVID-19 pandemic			
2022	Holon	Iakov Progrebinskii	Nikita Kovalenko	Tamir Kuperman	
2023	Holon	Tamir Kuperman	Iakov Pogrebinskii	Nikita Kovalenko	
2024	Holon	Tamir Kuperman	Nikita Sheiko	Kirill Sheiko	
2025	Holon	Tamir Kuperman	Kirill Sheiko	Nikita Sheiko	
2026	Holon	Kirill Sheiko	Nikita Sheiko	Matvei Sokolov	

=== Women's singles ===
Junior women's event medalists
Year	Location	Gold	Silver	Bronze	Ref.
2000	Metula				
2001	Metula				
2002	Metula				
2003	Metula	Keren Shua Haim	Tamar Katz		
2004	Metula	Keren Shua Haim	Rima Beliy		
2005	Metula	Rachel Kapelner	Rima Beliy		
2006	Metula	Jenna Syken	Rima Beliy		
2007	Metula				
2008	Metula	Tamar Katz	Jenna Syken	Sophia Bardakov	
2009	Metula	Sophia Bardakova	Rebecca Skolnik	Marta Martinov	
2020	Holon	Mariia Seniuk	Viktoria Uschenkova	Ivetta Berkovich	
2021	Holon	Competition cancelled due to the COVID-19 pandemic			
2022	Holon	Mariia Seniuk	Elisabet Gervits	Ella Chen	
2023	Holon	Mariia Dmitrieva	Gabriella Grinberg	Anna Sheniuk	
2024	Holon	Sophia Shifrin	Anna Sheniuk	Anna Iushchenkova	
2025	Holon	Sophia Shifrin	Simona Tkachman	Gabriella Grinberg	
2026	Holon	Sophia Shifrin	Simona Tkachman	Izabella Kirillova	

=== Pairs ===
Junior pairs event medalists
Year	Location	Gold	Silver	Bronze	Ref.
2020	Holon	No junior pairs competitors			
2021	Holon	Competition cancelled due to the COVID-19 pandemic			
2022–23	Holon	No junior pairs competitors			
2024	Holon	Sofia Enkina; Nikita Kovalenko	No other competitors		
2025-26	Holon	No junior pairs competitors			

=== Ice dance ===
Junior ice dance event medalists
Year	Location	Gold	Silver	Bronze	Ref.
2000	Metula				
2001	Metula	Alexandra Zaretsky; Roman Zaretsky			
2002	Metula				
2003	Metula	Alexandra Zaretsky; Roman Zaretsky			
2004	Metula	Alexandra Zaretsky; Roman Zaretsky			
2005	Metula				
2006	Metula				
2007	Metula				
2008	Metula	No junior ice dance competitors			
2009	Metula	Ariana Weintraub; Avidan Brown	No other competitors		
2020	Holon	Maria Nosovitski; Michael Nosovitski	Michaella Sewall; Oleksandr Kolosovsky	No other competitors	
2021	Holon	Competition cancelled due to the COVID-19 pandemic			
2022	Holon	No junior ice dance competitors			
2023	Holon	Mishel Moshaiev; Dmytriy Kravchenko	No other competitors		
2024	Holon	Elizabeth Tkachenko; Alexei Kiliakov	No other competitors		
2025	Holon	No junior ice dance competitors			
2026	Holon	Julia Epps; Blake Gilman	No other competitors		
