= Sergei Sakhnovski =

Israeli ice dancer

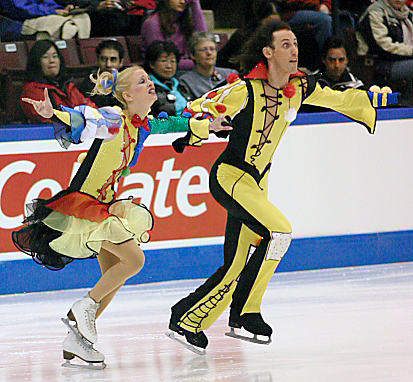
- Chait / Sakhnovski at the 2003 Skate Canada International

Personal information
- Native name: סרגיי סחנובסקי
- Born: May 15, 1975 (age 51) Moscow, Soviet Union
- Height: 1.75 m (5 ft 9 in)

Figure skating career
- Country: Israel (from 1995); Russia (until 1995)
- Began skating: 1979
- Retired: 2007
Medal record
Figure skating
Ice dancing
Representing Israel (with Chait)
World Championships
Bronze medal – third place	2002 Nagano	Ice dancing
Representing Russia (with Svirina)
World Junior Championships
Gold medal – first place	1993 Seoul	Ice dancing
Silver medal – second place	1994 Colorado Springs	Ice dancing

Sergei Sakhnovski (Hebrew: סרגיי סחנובסקי, Russian: Серге́й Сахно́вский; born May 15, 1975) is an Israeli ice dancer. With partner Galit Chait, he is the 2002 World bronze medalist for Israel. With previous partner Ekaterina Svirina, he is the 1993 World Junior champion for Russia.

== Career ==
Sakhnovski began skating at age four and took up ice dancing when he was eight. Early in his career, he skated with Marina Anissina and Ekaterina Svirina. He spend a season in France with Sandra Poletto. With Svirina, he won the World Junior Championships in 1993 and took the silver medal in 1994.

He teamed up with Galit Chait in 1995. They initially trained in Russia with Ludmila Buytskova and Elena Maslenikova and then moved to Monsey, New York. In 2002, they were the first Israeli ice dance team to win a medal (bronze) at World Championships. They competed in three Olympics, finishing 14th in 1998, 6th in 2002, and 8th in 2006. Their coaches included Natalia Dubova, Tatiana Tarasova, Evgeni Platov, Natalia Linichuk and Gennadi Karponosov.

He appeared in the first season of ice show contest Ice Age.

== Programs ==
(with Chait)

Season	Original dance	Free dance	Exhibition
2005–2006	Cha Cha by Manhattan Transfer; Rhumba by Mambo Kings; Samba by Crazy Brazilians	Bolero by Maurice Ravel	
2004–2005	Quickstep: Sing, Sing, Sing by Benny Goodman; Slow Foxtrot: Smile by Nat King Cole; Quickstep: Sing, Sing, Sing by Benny Goodman	Toccata and Fugue in D minor by Johann Sebastian Bach	
2003–2004	Rock'n Roll: Keep Knocking by Little Richard; Blues: Minnie the Moocher by Nino Rota; Rock'n Roll: Keep Knocking by Little Richard	Pagliacci by Ruggero Leoncavallo; Federico Fellini films	Gipsy Kings
2002–2003	March: Radetzky March op. 228 by Johann Strauss I; Waltz by Dmitri Shostakovich; Polka from the Bartered Bride by Bedřich Smetana; Polka from the Bartered Bride by Bedřich Smetana; Waltz by Dmitri Shostakovich; Polka from the Bartered Bride by Bedřich Smetana	Variations on a Theme of Paganini by Sergei Rachmaninoff; Lord of the Rings by Howard Shore; Lord of the Dance by Ronan Hardiman	Stranger in My House by Tamia
2001–2002	Flamenco; Paso Doble: Malaguena by Antonio Carrera; Tango: El Tango de Roxanne (from Moulin Rouge!) by Jose Feliciano	Hava Nagila	Unforgettable by Natalie Cole, Nat King Cole
2000–2001	Quickstep: "Sing, Sing, Sing" by Louis Prima; Foxtrot: "Bei mir bist du schön" by James Hopiner	Variations on a Theme of Paganini by Sergei Rachmaninoff	Unforgettable by Natalie Cole, Nat King Cole
1999–2000	Samba by Ricky Martin	1492: Conquest of Paradise by Vangelis	
1998–1999	Waltz	Russian folk	
1997–1998	Hey Boy Hey Girl by Louis Prima	Jewish music	
1996–1997	Tango	My Sweet and Tender Beast by Eugen Doga	
1995–1996	Paso Doble	The Godfather by Nino Rota	

== Competitive highlights ==
GP: Champions Series / Grand Prix

=== With Chait ===
International
Event	95–96	96–97	97–98	98–99	99–00	00–01	01–02	02–03	03–04	04–05	05–06
Olympics			14th				6th				8th
Worlds	23rd	18th	14th	13th	5th	6th	3rd	6th	7th	6th	6th
Europeans		14th	12th	10th	6th	5th	5th	6th	5th	4th	5th
GP Final						4th	5th	5th		4th	4th
GP Cup of China										2nd	2nd
GP Cup of Russia		7th				3rd	2nd		3rd		2nd
GP Lalique				5th	6th						
GP Nations/Bofrost			7th	5th				2nd			
GP NHK Trophy			7th		5th			3rd	3rd		
GP Skate America						4th	2nd	4th		2nd	
GP Skate Canada						2nd	2nd		4th	3rd	
Goodwill Games							2nd				
Nebelhorn Trophy	9th										
Skate Israel	6th	2nd	1st	1st	1st				1st		1st
Vienna Cup			3rd								
Lysiane Lauret			1st								
National
Israeli Champ.	1st	1st	1st		1st	1st	1st	1st	1st	1st	

=== With Svirina ===
International
Event	1992–93	1993–94	1994–95
Goodwill Games			3rd
International: Junior
World Junior Championships	1st	2nd	
European Youth Olympic Fest.	2nd		

== See also ==
- List of select Jewish figure skaters
