= Alexander Shakalov =

Ukrainian ice dancer

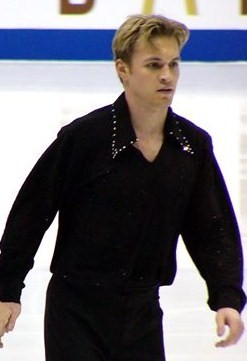
- Shakalov at the 2004 NHK Trophy

Personal information
- Born: 26 March 1982 (age 44) Dnipropetrovsk
- Height: 1.74 m (5 ft 8 1/2 in)

Figure skating career
- Country: Ukraine
- Began skating: 1986
- Retired: 2011

Alexander Shakalov (Ukrainian: Олександр Васильович Шакалов; born 26 March 1982 in Dnipropetrovsk, Ukrainian SSR) is a Ukrainian ice dancer.

== Career ==
Shakalov competed with Viktoria Polzykina and Julia Grigorenko for Ukraine in his early career. From 2003 to 2007, he competed with Olga Akimova for Uzbekistan. They were the 2004-2005 Uzbekistani national champions. In 2009, Shakalov teamed up with Siobhan Heekin-Canedy and resumed competing for his native country. The couple was coached by Galit Chait and Natalia Dubova and split after the 2011 World Championships. He retired from competitive figure skating after the 2011 World Championships, and he is now working as a coach.

== Programs ==
=== With Heekin-Canedy ===
Season	Short dance	Free dance
2010–2011	Waltz: Desde el Alma by Rosita Melo; Tango: El Choclo by Ángel Villoldo	La Vie en rose; Padam Padam; Je Ne Regrette Rien by Édith Piaf; L'Arrestation by Christopher Gunning

=== With Akimova ===
Season	Original dance	Free dance
2006–2007	Assassin's Tango (from Mr. & Mrs. Smith (2005 film)) by John Powell	Aranjuez Mon Amour
2005–2006	Cha Cha; Rhumba; Samba	Libertango by Astor Piazzolla
2004–2005	Charleston: Hallo, du suesse Klingelfee; Slow Foxtrot: La Traviesa; Quickstep: Dancing Fool	The Mask (film): Hi De Ho; This Business of Love; You Would Be My Baby; Hey! Pachuco!

=== With Grigorenko ===
Season	Original dance	Free dance
2001–2002	Paso doble; Flamenco	Mythodea (from 1492: Conquest of Paradise) by Vangelis performed by the London Metropolitan Orchestra

=== With Polzykina ===
Season	Original dance	Free dance
2000–2001	Quickstep: The Continental by Con Corad, Norb Magidison; Charleston	Secret Tear by Aria

== Competitive highlights ==
=== With Heekin-Canedy for Ukraine ===
Results
International
Event	2009–2010	2010–2011
Worlds		15th
Europeans		11th
Nebelhorn Trophy		10th
Finlandia Trophy		6th
Coupe de Nice		4th
Mont Blanc Trophy	5th	4th
Trophy of Lyon		3rd
National
Ukrainian Champ.	4th	1st

=== With Teremtsova for Ukraine ===
Results
National
Event	2008–2009
Ukrainian Championships	5th

=== With Akimova for Uzbekistan ===
Results
International
Event	2003–04	2004–05	2005–06	2006–07
Worlds		27th	25th	24th
Four Continents		13th	11th	10th
GP Cup of China				9th
GP NHK Trophy		11th		
Karl Schäfer			16th	
Ondrej Nepela			2nd	
Pavel Roman		3rd		
Skate Israel	6th			
National
Uzbekistani Champ.	1st	1st		
GP = Grand Prix

=== With Grigorenko for Ukraine ===
Results
International
Event	2001–2002
Junior Worlds	18th
JGP Bulgaria	5th
JGP Poland	8th
National
Ukrainian Champ.	2nd J.
J. = Junior level; JGP = Junior Grand Prix

=== With Polzykina for Ukraine ===
Results
International
Event	1996–97	1997–98	1998–99	1999–00	2000–01
JGP Final					6th
JGP Croatia				6th	
JGP Czech					2nd
JGP Slovenia				6th	
JGP Ukraine					2nd
EYOF			2nd		
National
Ukrainian Champ.	7th J.	4th J.	2nd J.	2nd	2nd
J. = Junior level; JGP = Junior Grand Prix
