= Dmitri Dun =

Ukrainian ice dancer (born 1989)

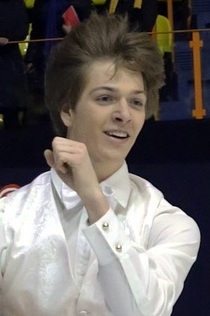
- Dun in 2013.

Personal information
- Full name: Ukrainian: Dmytro Oleksiyovych Dun
- Born: 7 November 1989 (age 36) Kharkiv, Ukrainian SSR, Soviet Union
- Height: 1.86 m (6 ft 1 in)

Figure skating career
- Country: Ukraine
- Began skating: 1993
- Retired: March 31, 2014

Dmitri Oleksiyovich Dun (Ukrainian: Дмитро Олексійович Дунь; born 7 November 1989) is a Ukrainian former competitive ice dancer. With Siobhan Heekin-Canedy, he is a three-time Ukrainian national champion and placed as high as 14th at the World Championships.

== Career ==
Early in his career, Dun competed with Alisa Agafonova. They made their ISU Junior Grand Prix debut in the 2004–05 season. In 2006, they won their first JGP medal, silver, in Taipei. In 2007–08, Agafonova/Dun placed 4th in one JGP event and took silver in another. They qualified for the ISU Junior Grand Prix Final where they finished 6th. They then placed 7th at the 2008 World Junior Championships.

In 2008–09, Agafonova/Dun won gold and silver medals on the JGP series. They qualified for their second JGP Final and finished 7th. They won the 2009 Ukrainian national junior title and were sent to the 2009 World Junior Championships where they finished 13th. The following season, the duo obtained their fifth JGP medal, bronze. They parted ways at the end of the season.

In mid-2011, Dun teamed up with Siobhan Heekin-Canedy. In their first season together, they won the Ukrainian national title and placed 15th at both the 2012 European Championships and 2012 World Championships.

In the 2012–13 season, Heekin-Canedy and Dun finished 12th at the 2013 European Championships and 14th at the 2013 World Championships. Their Worlds placement gave Ukraine a spot in the ice dancing event at the 2014 Winter Olympic.

Dun retired from competition on March 31, 2014 and moved with his wife to Chicago, Illinois.

In 2015 Dmitri moved to West Palm Beach, Florida, and he is Ice dance coach in Palm Beach Skate Zone, Lake worth, FL.

Dun entered the show skating world and is currently the pair team with partner Mickayla Lindberg at Busch Gardens in Tampa FL.

== Programs ==
=== With Heekin-Canedy ===
Season	Short dance	Free dance
2013–2014	Quickstep: That Man by Caro Emerald; Foxtrot: Speaking of Happiness by Gloria Lynne; Charleston: Pigalle by Patricia Kaes	El Tango de Roxanne (from Moulin Rouge!)
2012–2013	Marguerite Waltz by Charles Gounod; Irish Party in Third Class (John Ryan's Polka)	Orobroy; Tango Serenato de Schubert by Franz Schubert; Orobroy; Gypsy
2011–2012	A Mi Manera by Gustavo Santador, Turio Cremishini; La Vuelta by Elsten Torres, Fernando Osorio; A Mi Manera by Gustavo Santador, Turio Cremishini	Notre Dame de Paris by Riccardo Cocciante: Les Temps des Cathedrales; Les Sans-Papiers; La Monture; Danse Mon Esmeralda

=== With Agafonova ===
Season	Original dance	Free dance
2009–2010	Gandzya (Ukrainian folk dance)	Blues for Klook by Eddy Louiss
2008–2009	Puttin' On the Ritz	Aurora (2006 film) by Valeri Tishler
2007–2008	Verkhovyno (Ukrainian folk dance)	Harem performed by Sarah Brightman
2006–2007	Tanguera by Astor Piazzolla	Pirates of the Caribbean by Klaus Badelt
2004–2005	Black Bottom; Torero; Fish and Chips	Spring Tango by Astor Piazzolla arranged by P. Nicholson

== Competitive highlights ==
=== With Heekin-Canedy ===
Results
International
Event	11–12	12–13	13–14
Olympics			24th
Worlds	15th	14th	
Europeans	15th	12th	23rd
GP Rostelecom Cup			8th
Cup of Nice	7th		
Golden Spin		3rd	
Ice Challenge	3rd		
Nebelhorn		6th	15th
NRW Trophy			5th
Pavel Roman		2nd	
Toruń Cup	2nd	1st	
Ukrainian Open			3rd
U.S. Classic		5th	
Winter Universiade			9th
National
Ukrainian Champ.	1st	1st	1st
Team events
Olympics			9th T 9th P
GP = Grand Prix; T = Team result; P = Personal result

=== With Agafonova ===
Results
International
Event	03–04	04–05	05–06	06–07	07–08	08–09	09–10
Junior Worlds					7th	13th	
JGP Final					6th	7th	
JGP Belarus						1st	3rd
JGP China		7th					
JGP Estonia					2nd		
JGP France				4th			
JGP Germany		10th			4th		
JGP Great Britain						2nd	
JGP Poland			10th				
JGP Taipei				2nd			
JGP Turkey							4th
Pavel Roman	4th N.	3rd N.			2nd J.		
National
Ukrainian		6th J.				1st J.	
JGP = Junior Grand Prix; WD = Withdrew; Levels: N. = Novice; J. = Junior
