= Alexei Bychenko =

Ukrainian-born Israeli figure skater

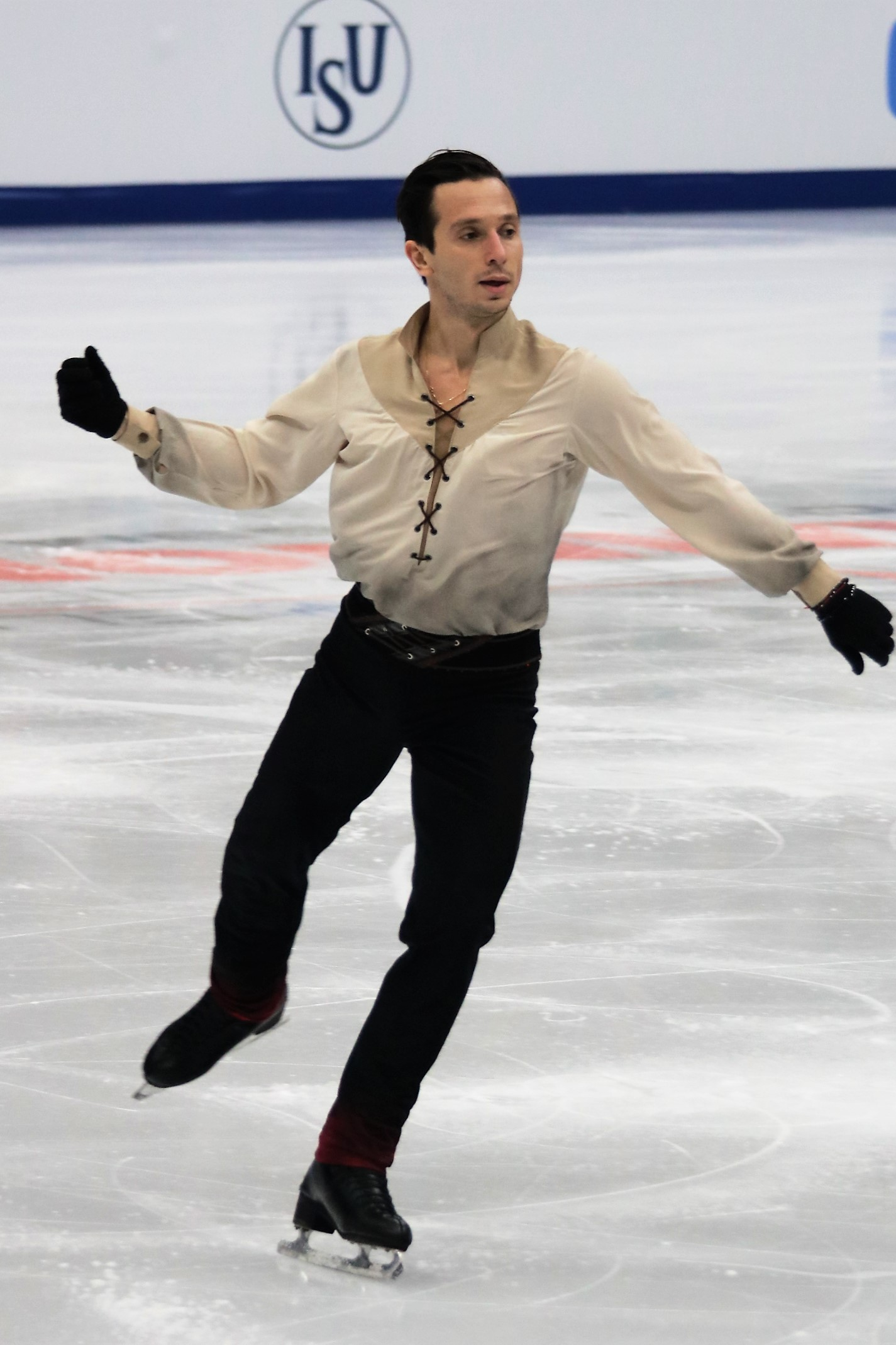
- Alexei Bychenko at the 2018 European Championships

Personal information
- Native name: אלכסיי ביצ'נקו
- Other names: Oleksii/Alexey Bychenko
- Born: 5 February 1988 (age 38) Kyiv, Ukraine, Soviet Union
- Height: 1.74 m (5 ft 9 in)

Figure skating career
- Country: Israel (2011–22); Ukraine (2002–10)
- Discipline: Men's singles
- Began skating: 1993
- Retired: 2022
- Highest WS: 7th (2017–18)

Medal record
Representing Israel
European Championships
Silver medal – second place	2016 Bratislava	Singles
Israeli Championships
Gold medal – first place	2016 Holon	Singles
Gold medal – first place	2017 Holon	Singles
Gold medal – first place	2018 Holon	Singles
Silver medal – second place	2015 Holon	Singles
Silver medal – second place	2019 Holon	Singles
Silver medal – second place	2022 Holon	Singles
Bronze medal – third place	2020 Holon	Singles
Representing Ukraine
Ukrainian Championships
Silver medal – second place	2007 Kyiv	Singles
Silver medal – second place	2008 Kyiv	Singles
Bronze medal – third place	2010 Dnipropetrovsk	Singles

Alexei Bychenko (Hebrew: אלכסיי ביצ'נקו; Ukrainian: Олексій Юрійович Биченко; born 5 February 1988) is a retired Ukrainian-born Israeli figure skater. He represented Ukraine through 2009 and Israel after that. He is the 2016 European Figure Skating Championships silver medalist and 2016 Rostelecom Cup bronze medalist. He is the first Israeli skater to medal at the European Championships. He placed fourth at 2018 Worlds. Bychenko competed for Israel at the 2014, 2018, and 2022 Winter Olympics.

== Early and personal life ==
Bychenko was born in Kyiv, Ukraine, and is Jewish. He studied at National Pedagogical Dragomanov University, in Kyiv. His mother is of Jewish descent, and he became an Israeli citizen and in 2010 began representing Israel in competitions.

== Career ==
Bychenko began skating in 1993.

=== For Ukraine ===
Representing Ukraine, Bychenko debuted on the ISU Junior Grand Prix (JGP) series in the 2003–04 season. His senior international debut took place in late September 2005 at Skate Israel, but he continued occasionally appearing on the junior level. He achieved his best JGP result, 8th, in October 2006 in Taipei, at his final junior event.

Bychenko became a two-time (2007, 2008) Ukrainian national silver medalist on the senior level. His final international appearance for Ukraine came in late November 2009 at the Crystal Skate of Romania.

=== For Israel ===
His coaches are Roman Serov, Nikolai Morozov, and Galit Chait Moracci, and his choreographer is Galit Chait Moracci. He trains in Hackensack, New Jersey.

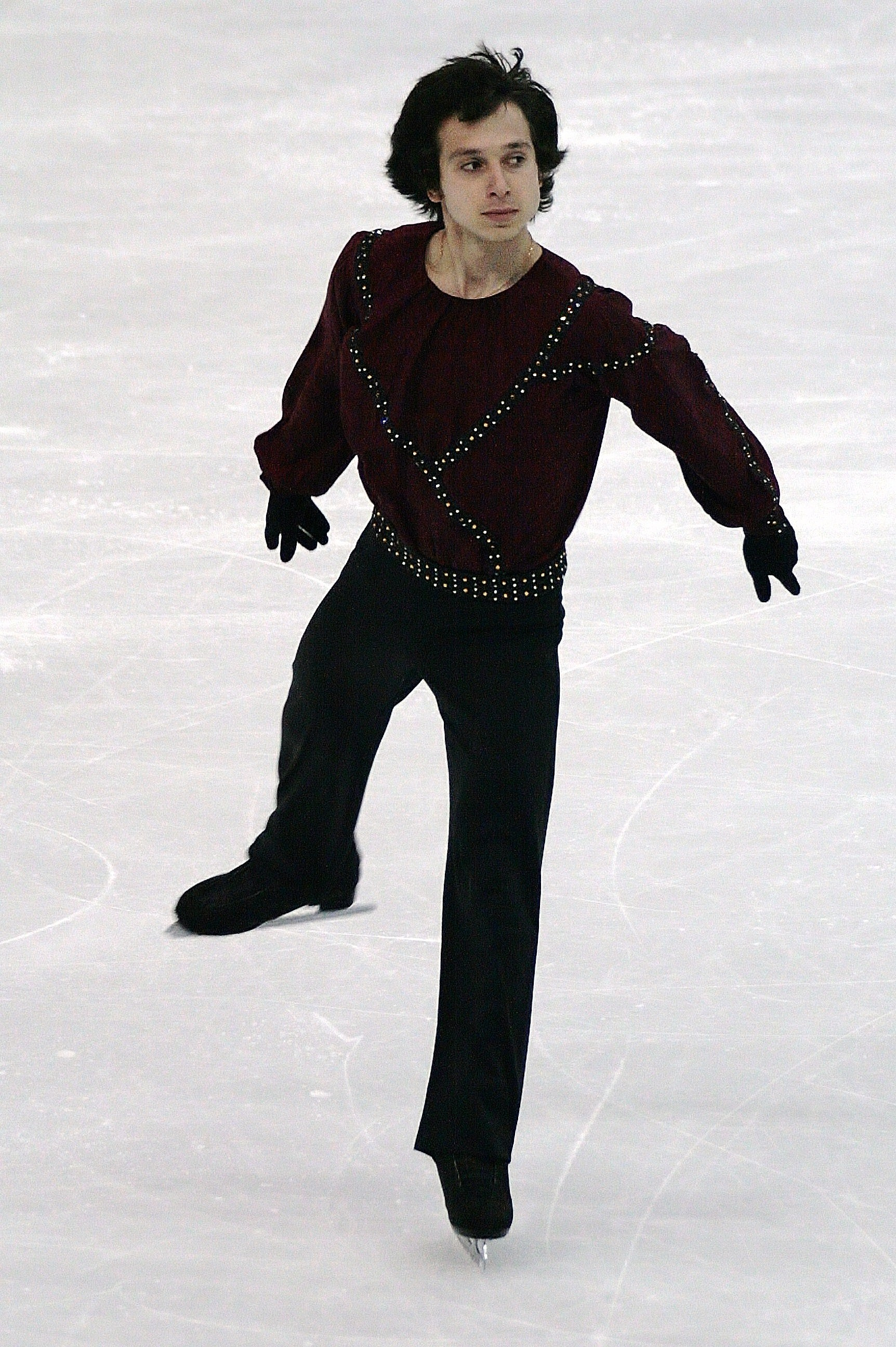
Bychenko at the 2012 World Figure Skating Championships

Bychenko first appeared internationally for Israel at the Golden Spin of Zagreb in December 2011. He qualified for the final segment at the 2012 European Championships in Sheffield and went on to finish 22nd overall. At the 2012 World Championships in Nice, he did not advance past the short program.

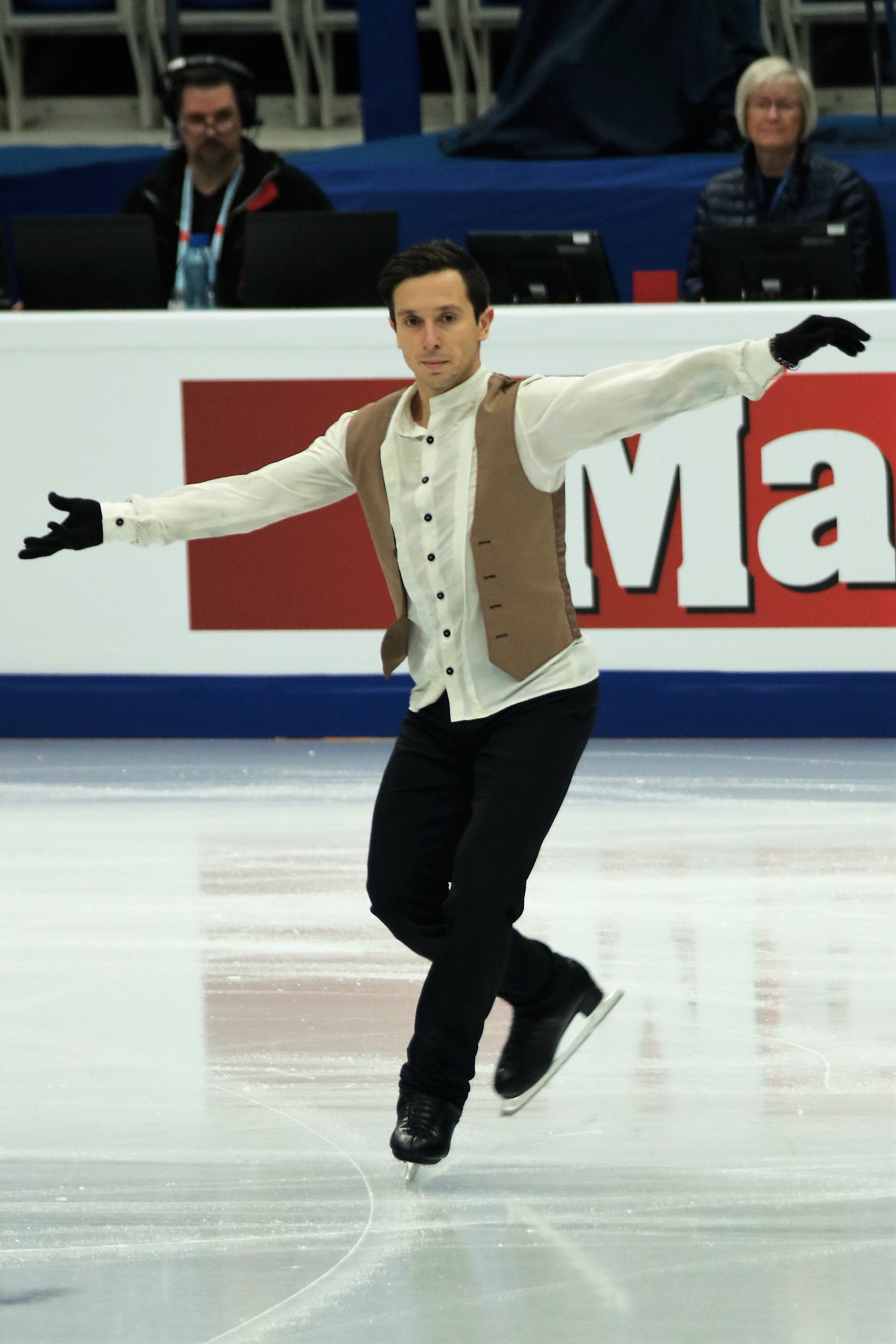
Bychenko at the 2018 European Championships

At the 2013 Nebelhorn Trophy, Bychenko qualified a spot for Israel in the men's event at the 2014 Winter Olympics.

He finished 21st competing for Israel at the 2014 Winter Olympics in Sochi, Russia.

Bychenko received his first Grand Prix invitations in the 2014–15 season. He finished fourth at the 2015 European Championships in Stockholm after placing seventh in the short program and fourth in the free skate.

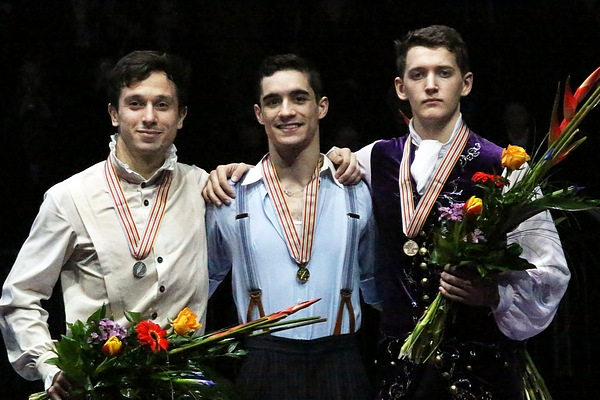
Bychenko at the 2016 European Figure Skating Championships podium.

At the 2016 European Championships in Bratislava, Bychenko placed fourth in both segments and edged out Russia's Maxim Kovtun for a silver medal by a margin of 0.35. It was Israel's first European figure skating medal.

In the 2016–17 season, Bychenko won bronze at a Grand Prix assignment, the 2016 Rostelecom Cup, and gold at a Challenger Series event, the Golden Spin of Zagreb. He ranked third in the short program, 9th in the free skate, and 5th overall at the 2017 European Championships in Ostrava, Czech Republic. In March, he placed 11th in the short, 12th in the free, and 10th overall at the 2017 World Championships in Helsinki, Finland. Due to his result, Israel qualified two spots in the men's event at the 2018 Winter Olympics in Pyeongchang, South Korea.

Bychenko competed for Israel at the 2018 Winter Olympics in Men's Single Figure Skating in Pyeongchang, South Korea, and served as Israel's flag bearer at the opening ceremonies. Bychenko finished the men's figure skating competition in 11th place overall, Israel's best result at the Games, bettering Israeli figure skater Michael Shmerkin’s 16th-place finish 24 years prior. He also came in second in the Men's Single Short Program, as part of the team event, as the Israeli team came in 8th.

Bychenko was named to Israeli team for the 2022 Winter Olympics, and finished twenty-sixth in the men's event.

It was announced that Bychenko had decided to retire from competition on May 24, 2022.

== Programs ==
Season	Short program	Free skating	Exhibition
2020–2021	Words by Harel Skaat	Pirates of the Caribbean by Klaus Badelt	
2019–2020	Words by Harel Skaat	Pirates of the Caribbean by Klaus Badelt	
2018–2019	Requiem for a Dream by Clint Mansell	Bram Stoker's Dracula by Wojciech Kilar	
2017–2018	Hava Nagila (Israeli folk song)	Pagliacci by Ruggero Leoncavallo; Bolero by Maurice Ravel	All Alone (from Ready for the Ride) by Geir Rönning
2016–2017	Chambermaid Swing by Parov Stelar	Pagliacci by Ruggero Leoncavallo	Soul Power; Happy by Derek Martin
2015–2016	All Alone (from Ready for the Ride) by Geir Rönning	Les Misérables by Claude-Michel Schönberg	Soul Power; Happy by Derek Martin; All Alone (from Ready for the Ride) by Geir Rönning
2014–2015	La traviata by Giuseppe Verdi	Nostradamus by Maksim Mrvica	Soul Power; Happy by Derek Martin
2013–2014	Swing Kids by James Horner; Bei mir bist du schoen; Sing Sing Sing	Nostradamus by Maksim Mrvica; Flamenco Farruca	
2012–2013	Party Sailor by Wilson Picket; John Rango by James Brown	Flamenco; Inception by Hans Zimmer	
2011–2012	Crouching Tiger, Hidden Dragon by Tan Dun	Cyrano de Bergerac by Jean-Claude Petit	
2008–2009	Assassin's Tango (from Mr. & Mrs. Smith) by John Powell	Alegria (from Cirque du Soleil) by René Dupéré	
2004–2006	Devil's Trill Sonata by Vanessa-Mae	Pirates of the Caribbean by Klaus Badelt	

== Results ==
GP: Grand Prix; CS: Challenger Series; JGP: Junior Grand Prix

=== For Israel ===
International
Event	11–12	12–13	13–14	14–15	15–16	16–17	17–18	18–19	19–20	20–21	21–22
Olympics			21st				11th				26th
Worlds	29th	31st	15th	17th	13th	10th	4th	22nd	C	24th	
Europeans	22nd	14th	10th	4th	2nd	5th	5th	9th	12th		
GP Cup of China				7th							
GP Finland								9th			
GP France							5th				
GP NHK Trophy						4th	3rd		11th		
GP Rostelecom					10th	3rd					
GP Skate America				11th	12th			9th	7th	6th	
CS Asian Open									4th		
CS Denis Ten MC											WD
CS Finlandia				5th		7th		WD			
CS Golden Spin						1st	2nd	10th	8th		13th
CS Ice Star							6th		WD		
CS Nebelhorn				7th					3rd		
CS Ondrej Nepela								WD			
CS Warsaw Cup											6th
Bavarian Open		5th									
Challenge Cup									6th	WD	
Cranberry Cup											6th
Cup of Tyrol						2nd					
Golden Spin	8th	5th	4th								
Ice Challenge		13th									
Nebelhorn Trophy		15th	5th								
Open Ice Mall								2nd			
Tallinn Trophy				1st							
Toruń Cup					1st						
U.S. Classic		14th	9th								WD
National
Israeli Champ.				2nd	1st	1st	1st	2nd	3rd		2nd
Team Events
Olympics							8th T				
Japan Open							1st T 6th P				

=== For Ukraine ===
International
Event	02–03	03–04	04–05	05–06	06–07	07–08	08–09	09–10
Crystal Skate						3rd	2nd	4th
Cup of Nice						11th		
Finlandia Trophy							11th	
Nepela Memorial								8th
Skate Israel				6th				
Universiade					29th			
International: Junior
JGP Andorra				15th				
JGP Croatia				10th				
JGP Czech Rep.		22nd						
JGP Taiwan					8th			
JGP Ukraine			19th					
National
Ukrainian Champ.	4th	4th	2nd J		2nd	2nd		3rd

== Detailed results ==
2021–22 season
Date	Event	SP	FS	Total
February 8–10, 2022	2022 Winter Olympics	26; 68.01	–	26; 68.01
December 9–11, 2021	2021 CS Golden Spin of Zagreb	4; 82.88	16; 128.67	13; 211.55
November 17–20, 2021	2021 CS Warsaw Cup	5; 79.35	5; 145.05	6; 224.40
2020–21 season
Date	Event	SP	FS	Total
March 22–28, 2021	2021 World Championships	18; 78.05	24; 112.40	24; 190.45
October 23–24, 2020	2020 Skate America	6; 77.48	8; 137.14	6; 214.62
2019–20 season
Date	Event	SP	FS	Total
February 20–23, 2020	2020 Challenge Cup	4; 75.15	9; 118.85	6; 194.00
January 20–26, 2020	2020 European Championships	8; 78.27	13; 140.76	12; 219.03
December 4–7, 2019	2019 CS Golden Spin of Zagreb	1; 81.31	10; 131.82	13; 213.13
November 22–24, 2019	2019 NHK Trophy	12; 61.97	11; 135.66	11; 197.63
30 October – 3 November 2019	2019 CS Asian Open Trophy	6; 67.81	4; 127.82	4; 195.03
October 18–20, 2019	2019 Skate America	6; 79.76	10; 139.94	7; 219.70
September 25–28, 2019	2019 CS Nebelhorn Trophy	2; 70.46	3; 144.24	3; 214.70
2018–19 season
Date	Event	SP	FS	Total
March 18–24, 2019	2019 World Championships	22; 77.67	22; 138.93	22; 216.60
20–23 February 2019	2019 Open Ice Mall Cup	2; 78.06	1; 156.51	2; 234.57
21–27 January 2019	2019 European Championships	7; 84.19	13; 136.31	9; 220.50
December 5–8, 2018	2018 CS Golden Spin of Zagreb	10; 72.94	12; 119.27	10; 192.21
2–4 November 2018	2018 Grand Prix of Helsinki	9; 74.05	8; 128.89	9; 202.33
19–21 October 2018	2018 Skate America	10; 69.69	8; 127.78	9; 197.47
4–7 October 2018	2018 CS Finlandia Trophy	22; 46.90	WD	WD
2017–18 season
Date	Event	SP	FS	Total
19–25 March 2018	2018 World Championships	7; 90.99	7; 167.29	4; 258.28
16–17 February 2018	2018 Winter Olympics	13; 84.13	9; 172.88	11; 257.01
9–11 February 2018	2018 Winter Olympics (team event)	2; 88.49	–	
15–21 January 2018	2018 European Championships	8; 74.97	4; 163.47	5; 238.44
6–9 December 2017	2017 CS Golden Spin of Zagreb	4; 77.88	3; 153.93	2; 231.81
17–19 November 2017	2017 Internationaux de France	5; 86.79	5; 160.65	5; 247.44
10–12 November 2017	2017 NHK Trophy	2; 85.52	3; 166.55	3; 252.07
26–29 October 2017	2017 CS Minsk-Arena Ice Star	4; 76.01	7; 135.20	6; 211.21
2016–17 season
Date	Event	SP	FS	Total
29 March – 2 April 2017	2017 World Championships	11; 85.28	12; 160.68	10; 245.96
25–29 January 2017	2017 European Championships	3; 86.68	9; 152.56	4; 239.24
7–10 December 2016	2016 CS Golden Spin of Zagreb	4; 76.18	2; 151.90	1; 228.08
25–27 November 2016	2016 NHK Trophy	7; 75.13	4; 154.74	4; 229.87
4–6 November 2016	2016 Rostelecom Cup	4; 86.81	3; 168.71	3; 255.52
6–10 October 2016	2016 CS Finlandia Trophy	6; 74.17	10; 129.58	7; 203.75
2015–16 season
Date	Event	SP	FS	Total
28 March – 3 April 2016	2016 World Championships	19; 69.86	11; 156.21	13; 226.07
26–31 January 2016	2016 European Championships	4; 84.09	4; 158.47	2; 242.56
6–10 January 2016	2016 Toruń Cup	1; 78.57	1; 149.95	1; 228.52
20–22 November 2015	2015 Rostelecom Cup	10; 67.46	10; 118.54	10; 186.00
23–25 October 2015	2015 Skate America	12; 50.68	12; 121.15	12; 171.83
2014–15 season
Date	Event	SP	FS	Total
23–29 March 2015	2015 World Championships	12; 74.98	16; 134.26	17; 209.26
26 Jan. – 1 Feb. 2015	2015 European Championships	7; 73.63	4; 146.59	4; 220.22
3–7 December 2014	2014 Tallinn Trophy	1; 65.72	1; 143.30	1; 209.02
7–9 November 2014	2014 Cup of China	5; 76.96	8; 127.19	7; 204.15
24–26 October 2014	2014 Skate America	11; 64.54	12; 121.44	11; 185.98
9–12 October 2014	2014 CS Finlandia Trophy	5; 59.03	5; 117.63	5; 176.66
24–27 September 2014	2014 CS Nebelhorn Trophy	7; 66.55	9; 112.16	7; 178.71
2013–14 season
Date	Event	SP	FS	Total
26–29 March 2014	2014 World Championships	12; 69.73	13; 141.51	15; 211.24
13–14 February 2014	2014 Winter Olympics	22; 62.44	21; 114.62	21; 177.06
13–19 January 2014	2014 European Championships	13; 63.68	9; 135.08	10; 203.76
5–8 December 2013	2013 Golden Spin of Zagreb	4; 62.34	3; 125.64	4; 187.98
26–28 September 2013	2013 Nebelhorn Trophy	8; 64.50	3; 132.96	5; 197.46
12–14 September 2013	2013 U.S. Classic	5; 62.19	9; 100.52	9; 162.71
