= Galit Chait =

Israeli former competitive ice dancer (born 1975)

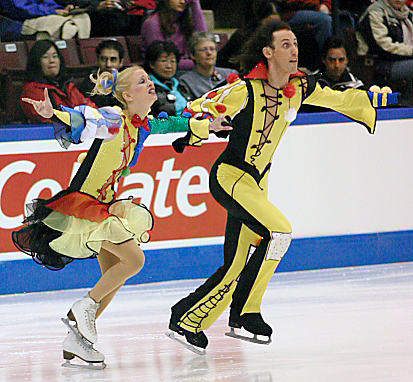
- Chait (left) and Sakhnovski (right) at the 2003 Skate Canada International

Personal information
- Native name: גלית חייט
- Full name: Galit Chait Moracci
- Born: January 29, 1975 (age 51) Kfar Saba, Israel
- Height: 1.58 m (5 ft 2 in)

Figure skating career
- Country: Israel
- Skating club: Bat Yam Club
- Began skating: 1984
- Retired: 2007
Medal record
Figure skating
Representing Israel
World Championships
Bronze medal – third place	2002 Nagano	Ice dancing

Galit Chait (Hebrew: גלית חייט, Galit Hayat; born on January 29, 1975) is an Israeli former competitive ice dancer. She and her partner Sergei Sakhnovski competed internationally for Israel from 1995 to 2006, becoming the 2002 World bronze medalists.

== Personal life ==
Chait was born in Israel. Her family moved to New Jersey when she was young, and she first skated at age 8.

Her father, Boris Chait, has been president of the Israeli Ice Skating Federation since 2002.

On August 23, 2008, Chait married former Italian military policeman Francesco Moracci in New Jersey and then on September 13, 2008, they had a second wedding in Florence, Italy. The two had met at the 2006 Olympic Games in Turin, Italy, where Moracci was a member of the security detail assigned to protect the Israeli team. They have two daughters, Raffaella, born in 2009, and Gabriella, born in 2011. They also have a son named Matteo.

Chait has been a resident of Paramus, New Jersey.

== Career ==
She first tried ice dancing in the 1990s when she traveled to Russia with her father, who was teaching there at a sports camp.

She competed with Max Sevostianov at the U.S. Nationals in 1992 and 1994. They were involved in a collision with Renée Roca at the 1994 U.S. Championships. In 1994, the pair placed 6th at the U.S. Nationals and 28th at the World Championships (representing Israel).

Chait met Sergei Sakhnovski while they were both students at the University of Delaware. Partnered since 1995, they trained initially in Russia with Ludmila Buytskova and Elena Maslenikova before moving to Monsey, New York. They rose steadily in the international rankings. The highlight of their career was winning the bronze medal at the 2002 World championships. Sergei Sakhnovski suffered a foot injury that forced the pair to miss the entire 2006–2007 season, and they subsequently announced their retirement. Their coaches included Natalia Dubova, Tatiana Tarasova, Evgeni Platov, Natalia Linichuk and Gennadi Karponosov.

Chait was the flag bearer for Israel at the 2002 and 2006 Winter Olympics.

Chait is an ISU Technical Specialist.

== Coaching career ==
After her retirement as a competitive skater, Chait began coaching ice dancing. She was the head coach of the Israeli brother-and-sister team Alexandra Zaretsky and Roman Zaretsky, and of Tamar Katz as well. In October 2008, Chait and the Zaretskys filed a lawsuit against the Ice House training rink in Hackensack, New Jersey, claiming that officials at the rink discriminated against them on the basis of their Israeli nationality, denying them prime skating time and threatening to ban them from the rink. The Zaretskys, under her coaching, won the gold medal at the 24th Winter Universiade Games in Harbin China, the bronze medal at Skate America 2009 and they qualified for the Winter Olympic Games in Vancouver Canada.

Chait has also coached:

- Cathy Reed / Chris Reed
- Siobhan Heekin-Canedy / Alexander Shakalov
- Allison Reed / Otar Japaridze
- Ekaterina Bugrov / Vasili Rogov
- Siobhan Heekin-Canedy / Dmitri Dun
- Anna Bolshem / Ronald Zilberberg
- Adel Tankova/ Ronald Zilberberg
- Tamir Kuperman

As of 2010, Chait was the head coach of the Israeli figure skating team.

== Programs ==
(with Sakhnovski)

Season	Original dance	Free dance	Exhibition
2005–2006	Cha Cha by Manhattan Transfer; Rhumba by Mambo Kings; Samba by Crazy Brazilians	Bolero by Maurice Ravel	
2004–2005	Quickstep: Sing, Sing, Sing by Benny Goodman; Slow Foxtrot: Smile by Nat King Cole; Quickstep: Sing, Sing, Sing by Benny Goodman	Toccata and Fugue in D minor by Johann Sebastian Bach	
2003–2004	Rock'n Roll: Keep Knocking by Little Richard; Blues: Minnie the Moocher by Nino Rota; Rock'n Roll: Keep Knocking by Little Richard	Pagliacci by Ruggero Leoncavallo; Federico Fellini films	Gipsy Kings
2002–2003	March: Radetzky March op. 228 by Johann Strauss I; Waltz by Dmitri Shostakovich; Polka from the Bartered Bride by Bedřich Smetana; Polka from the Bartered Bride by Bedřich Smetana; Waltz by Dmitri Shostakovich; Polka from the Bartered Bride by Bedřich Smetana	Variations on a Theme of Paganini by Sergei Rachmaninoff; Lord of the Rings by Howard Shore; Lord of the Dance by Ronan Hardiman	Stranger in My House by Tamia
2001–2002	Flamenco; Paso Doble: Malaguena by Antonio Carrera; Tango: El Tango de Roxanne (from Moulin Rouge!) by Jose Feliciano	Hava Nagila	Unforgettable by Natalie Cole, Nat King Cole
2000–2001	Quickstep: "Sing, Sing, Sing" by Louis Prima; Foxtrot: "Bei mir bist du schön" by James Hopiner	Variations on a Theme of Paganini by Sergei Rachmaninoff	Unforgettable by Natalie Cole, Nat King Cole
1999–2000	Samba by Ricky Martin	1492: Conquest of Paradise by Vangelis	
1998–1999	Waltz	Russian folk	
1997–1998	Hey Boy Hey Girl by Louis Prima	Jewish music	
1996–1997	Tango	My Sweet and Tender Beast by Eugen Doga	
1995–1996	Paso Doble	The Godfather by Nino Rota	

== Competitive highlights ==
GP: Champions Series / Grand Prix

=== With Sakhnovski ===
International
Event	95–96	96–97	97–98	98–99	99–00	00–01	01–02	02–03	03–04	04–05	05–06
Olympics			14th				6th				8th
Worlds	23rd	18th	14th	13th	5th	6th	3rd	6th	7th	6th	6th
Europeans		14th	12th	10th	6th	5th	5th	6th	5th	4th	5th
GP Final						4th	5th	5th		4th	4th
GP Cup of China										2nd	2nd
GP Cup of Russia		7th				3rd	2nd		3rd		2nd
GP Lalique				5th	6th						
GP Nations/Bofrost			7th	5th				2nd			
GP NHK Trophy			7th		5th			3rd	3rd		
GP Skate America						4th	2nd	4th		2nd	
GP Skate Canada						2nd	2nd		4th	3rd	
Goodwill Games							2nd				
Nebelhorn Trophy	9th										
Skate Israel	6th	2nd	1st	1st	1st				1st		1st
Vienna Cup			3rd								
Lysiane Lauret			1st								
National
Israeli Champ.	1st	1st	1st		1st	1st	1st	1st	1st	1st	

=== With Sevostianov ===
International
Event	1992–93	1993–94	1994–95
World Championships		28th	
Karl Schäfer Memorial			7th
Nebelhorn Trophy			10th
National
U.S. Championships	12th	6th	

== See also ==
- List of select Jewish figure skaters
