= Justyna Plutowska =

Polish ice dancer (born 1991)

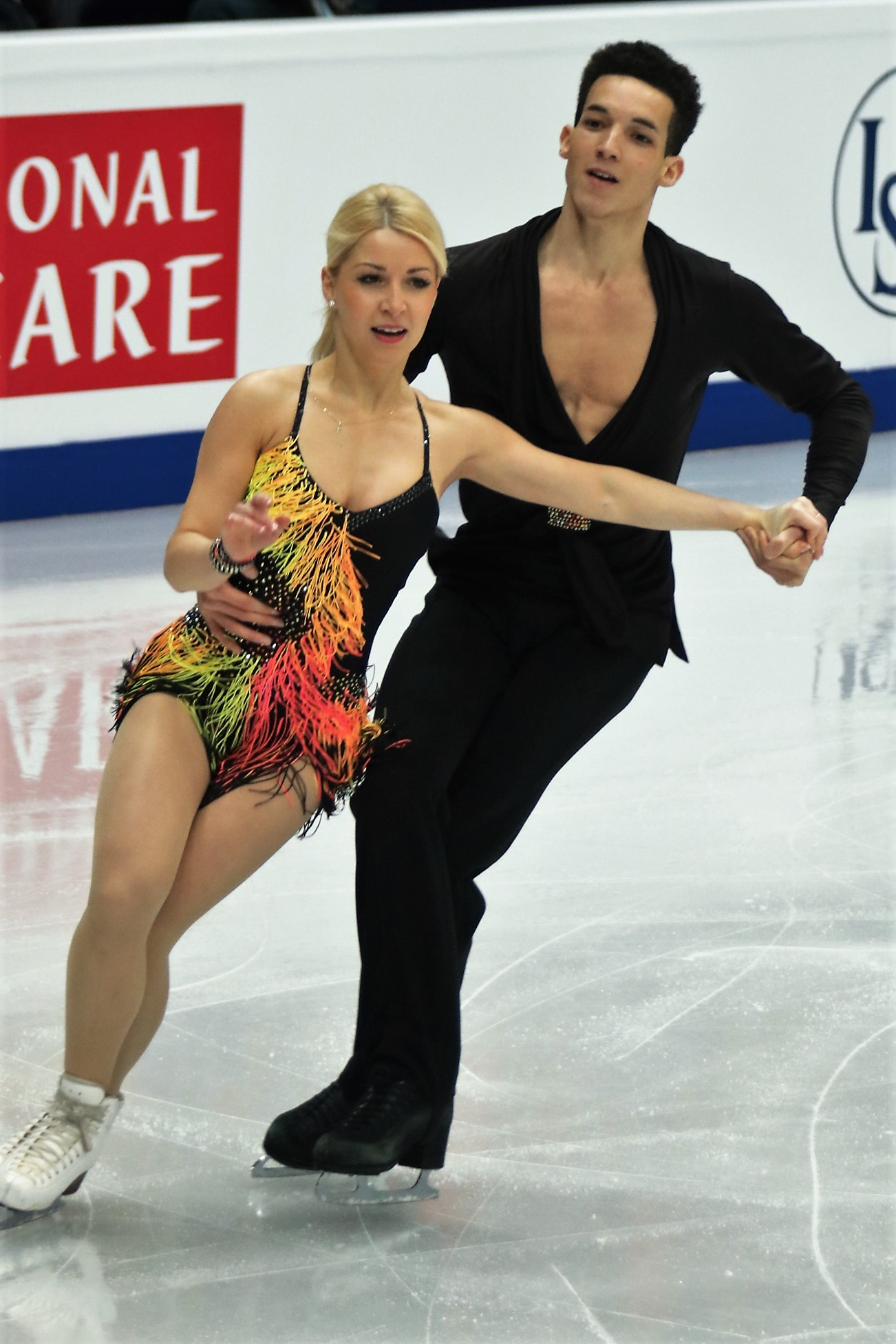
- Plutowska with Flemin at the 2018 European Championships

Personal information
- Born: 27 June 1991 (age 35) Gdynia, Poland
- Height: 1.56 m (5 ft 1 1/2 in)

Figure skating career
- Country: Poland
- Partner: Jérémie Flemin
- Coach: Romain Haguenauer, Marie-France Dubreuil, Patrice Lauzon
- Skating club: GKS Stoczniowiec Gdańsk
- Began skating: 1996
- Retired: November 7, 2020

Justyna Plutowska (born 27 June 1991) is a Polish ice dancer. With former partner Peter Gerber, she is the 2013 Finlandia Trophy bronze medalist and 2014 Bavarian Open champion.

== Personal life ==
Justyna Plutowska was born 27 June 1991 in Gdynia, Poland. Her father is a figure skating coach.

== Career ==
=== Early years ===
Plutowska began figure skating at the age of three or four. After starting out in singles, she turned to ice dancing when she was about 12 or 13. Her first partner was Mateusz Krupowies. The two won the novice ice dancing title at the 2006 Polish Championships.

=== Partnership with Pietrzyński ===
Plutowska teamed up with Dawid Pietrzyński in 2006. The duo won the junior title at the 2009 Polish Championships and were sent to the 2009 World Junior Championships in Sofia, Bulgaria. They ranked 25th in the compulsory dance and 26th in the original dance, which did not allow them to advance to the final segment.

The following season, Plutowska/Pietrzyński repeated as national junior champions and were assigned to the 2010 World Junior Championships in The Hague, Netherlands. Ranked 18th in both the compulsory and original dances, they qualified to the free dance and finished 20th overall. They were coached by Mirosław Plutowski in Gdańsk.

In the 2010–11 season, Plutowska/Pietrzyński moved up to the senior level and took the silver medal at the Polish Championships, behind Alexandra Zvorigina / Maciej Bernadowski. They made no senior international appearances.

=== Partnership with Gerber ===
Plutowska teamed up with Peter Gerber in June 2012. They were coached by Igor Shpilband in Novi, Michigan, and represented GKS Stoczniowiec Gdańsk. Plutowska/Gerber made their debut at the 2012 U.S. International Classic, finishing eighth. They took the silver medal at the 2013 Polish Championships and placed 27th at the 2013 World Championships in London, Ontario, Canada.

In the 2013–14 season, Plutowska/Gerber placed 9th at the U.S. International Classic before competing at the 2013 Nebelhorn Trophy, the final Olympic qualifier. They were 14th in the short dance and 8th in the free dance, finishing 10th overall at Nebelhorn and becoming second alternates for a spot at the 2014 Winter Olympics. Plutowska/Gerber won their first international medal, bronze, at the 2013 Finlandia Trophy one week later. They reached the free dance at the 2014 European Championships in Bratislava and finished 16th overall. After taking gold at the 2014 Bavarian Open in February, the two competed at the 2014 World Championships, held in Saitama, Japan in March, and finished 22nd. Their partnership ended in early May 2014, when Plutowska decided to leave skating for personal reasons.

=== Partnership with Flemin ===
Plutowska teamed up with French ice dancer Jérémie Flemin in May 2016. They decided to represent Poland and debuted their partnership at the 2016 CS Lombardia Trophy, finishing 6th. The two were coached by Barbara Fusar-Poli and Stefano Caruso in Milan, Italy.

Plutowska/Flemin withdrew after the short dance from the 2017 Four Nationals due to a hernia in his back. In 2018 they achieved silver at Polish nationals.

In June 2018 Plutowska/Flemin moved to Montreal, where they are coached at Gadbois Centre by Romain Haguenauer, Patrice Lauzon and Marie-France Dubreuil. Together they share their life via the YouTube channel call: J & J ON ICE

== Programs ==
=== With Flemin ===
Season	Rhythm dance	Free dance
2018–19	Tango: Juguete Rabioso by La Chicama; Flamenco: Duende by Bozzio Levin Stevens	Love is a Bitch; Same Old Song (S.O.S. Part 1); I Feel Like I'm Drowning by Two Feet
2017–18	Samba: Bango Boom by DJ Maksy; Rhumba: Paxi Ni Ngongo by Bonga; Samba: Locuraleza by Oma	Ghost: The Musical medley Overture Unchained Melody I Had a Life
2016–17	Blues: A Woman's Worth by Alicia Keys; Hip hop: Recess (Milo and Otis remix) by Skrillex and Kill the Noise	The Great Gig in the Sky; Hey You by Pink Floyd; Miss You by The Rolling Stones

=== With Gerber ===
Season	Short dance	Free dance
2013–14	Quickstep, foxtrot, quickstep: Le Jazz Hot!	The Artist by Ludovic Bource
2012–13	Mary Poppins; Waltz: Chim Cher-ee; Polka: Supercalifragilisticexpialidocious	The Artist by Ludovic Bource

=== With Pietrzyński ===
Season	Original dance	Free dance
2009–10	Polish polka: Rybaczka by Antoni Sutowski; Polish waltz (Kashubia): Szëmiała leszczëna; Polish polka: Dzek Polnocny z Zalewa	Santa Maria (del Buen Ayre) by Gotan Project; Oblivion by Astor Piazzolla; Santa Maria (del Buen Ayre) by Gotan Project
2008–09	Charleston: Sitting Pretty; Foxtrot; Charleston: Sitting Pretty by Kander and Ebb	Santa Maria (del Buen Ayre) by Gotan Project; Oblivion by Astor Piazzolla; Santa Maria (del Buen Ayre) by Gotan Project

== Competitive highlights ==
CS: Challenger Series; JGP: Junior Grand Prix

=== With Flemin ===
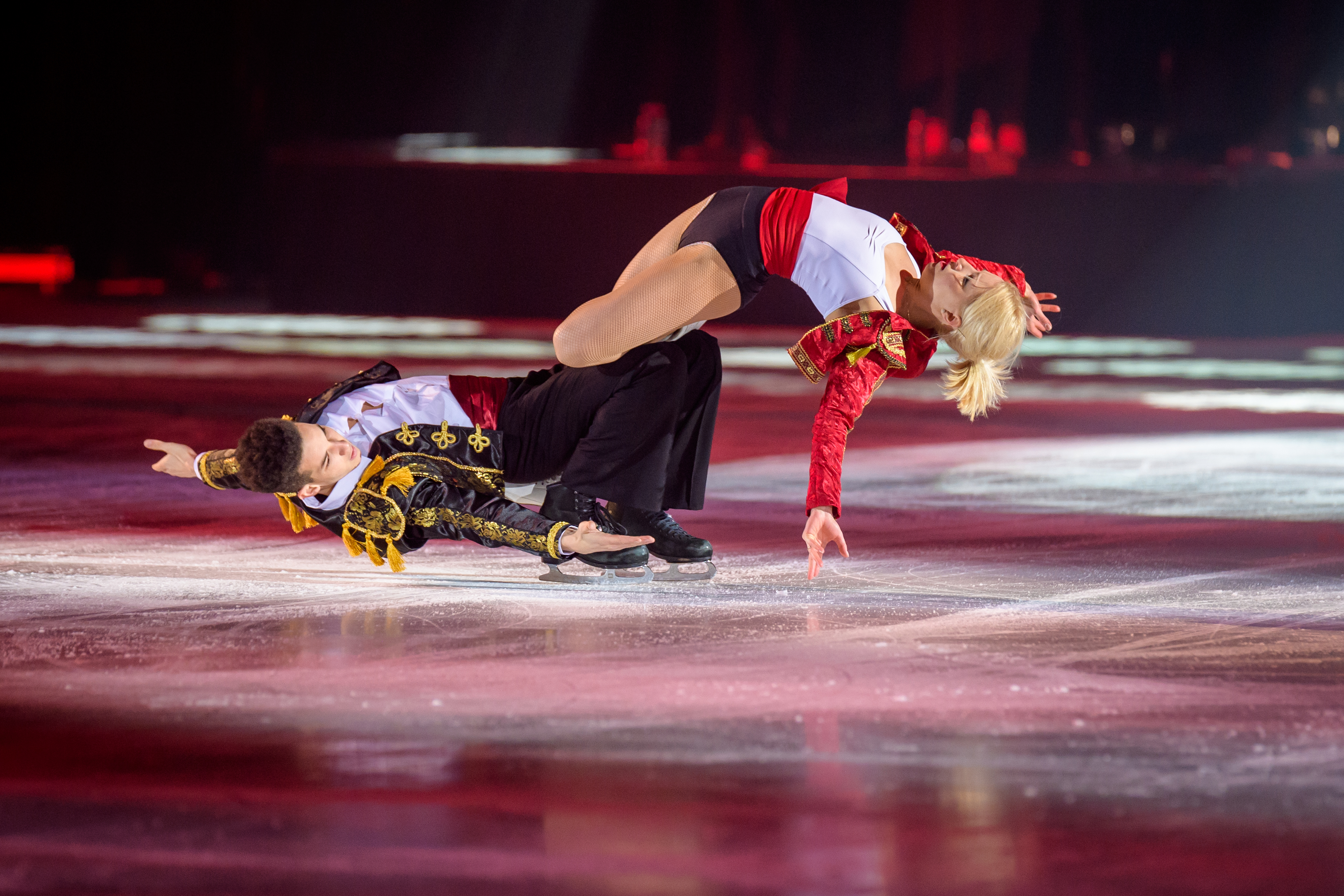
Art on Ice (Lausanne 2018)

International
Event	2016–17	2017–18	2018–19	2019–20
European Champ.		21st	22nd	22nd
CS Alpen Trophy			5th	
CS Asian Open				8th
CS Ice Star		9th		
CS Lombardia Trophy	6th			
CS Ondrej Nepela Memorial	10th			
CS U.S. Classic				6th
CS Warsaw Cup	4th	9th		5th
Bavarian Open			4th	
International Cup of Nice	10th	12th		
NRW Trophy	4th			
Open d'Andorra		6th		
Pavel Roman Memorial				2nd
Warsaw Cup			4th	
National
Polish Championships	WD	2nd	2nd	2nd
WD = Withdrew

=== With Gerber ===
International
Event	2012–13	2013–14
World Champ.	27th	22nd
European Champ.		16th
Bavarian Open		1st
Crystal Skate	6th	
Finlandia Trophy	7th	3rd
Ice Challenge	8th	
Nebelhorn Trophy		10th
Toruń Cup	5th	
U.S. Classic	8th	9th
National
Polish Champ.	2nd	1st

=== With Pietrzyński ===
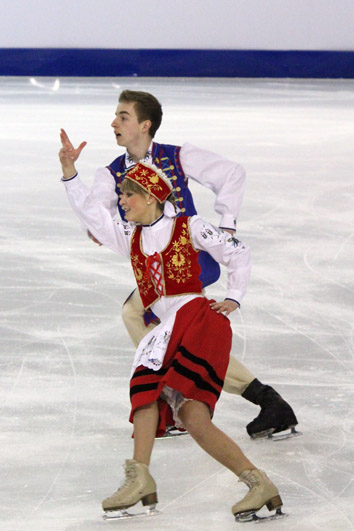
Plutowska/Pietrzynski compete at the 2010 World Junior Championships, wearing costumes from Kashubia

International
Event	06–07	07–08	08–09	09–10	10–11
Junior Worlds			27th	20th	
JGP Croatia		11th			
JGP Czech Republic			13th		
JGP Germany		18th		15th	
JGP Poland				6th	
JGP Spain			15th		
Challenge Cup		2nd J			
NRW Trophy		8th J			
Pavel Roman		9th J			
National
Polish Champ.		2nd J	1st J	1st J	2nd
Regional Children's; Cup of Poland	2nd J				
Mazovia Cup		4th J	1st J	1st J	
J = Junior level

=== With Krupowies ===
National
Event	2005–06
Polish Championships	1st N
N = Advanced novice level
