= 2014 World Figure Skating Championships =

Figure skating event

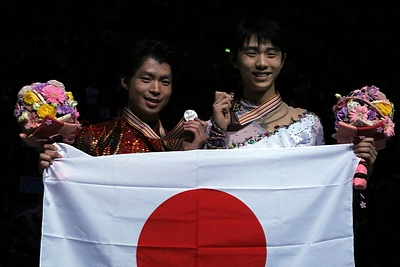
- Yuzuru Hanyu (right) and Tatsuki Machida (left) at the 2014 World Championships
- Type: ISU Championship
- Date: March 24 – 30
- Season: 2013–14
- Location: Saitama, Japan
- Host: Japan Skating Federation
- Venue: Saitama Super Arena

Champions
- Men's singles: (Japan) Yuzuru Hanyu
- Ladies' singles: (Japan) Mao Asada
- Pairs: (Germany) Aliona Savchenko / Robin Szolkowy
- Ice dance: (Italy) Anna Cappellini / Luca Lanotte
- Previous: 2013 World Championships
- Next: 2015 World Championships

The 2014 World Figure Skating Championships was an international figure skating competition held in Saitama, Japan, at the Saitama Super Arena from March 24 to 30. Medals were awarded in the disciplines of men's singles, ladies' singles, pair skating, and ice dancing. The event also determined the number of entries a country may send to the 2015 World Championships.

== Records ==
The following new ISU best scores were set during this competition:

Event	Component	Skaters	Score	Date	Ref
Ladies	Short program	(Japan) Mao Asada	78.66	27 March 2014	

== Qualification ==
All skaters that represent an ISU member nations and reached the age of 15 before 1 July 2013 were eligible to compete at the World Championships. National associations select entries according to their own criteria but the ISU rules mandate that their athletes must have achieved the required minimum technical score at an international event prior to the World Championships in order to be eligible to contest this event.

=== Minimum TES ===
Minimum technical scores (TES)
Discipline	SP / SD	FS / FD
Men	34	63
Ladies	26	46
Pairs	24	41
Ice dancing	28	38
Must be achieved at an ISU-sanctioned international event in the ongoing or preceding season. SP and FS scores may be attained at different events.

=== Number of entries per discipline ===
Based on the results of the 2013 World Championships, each ISU member nation was allowed to send one to three entries per discipline.

Spots	Men	Ladies	Pairs	Dance
3	Canada; Japan	Japan; South Korea; United States	Canada; Russia	Canada; Russia; United States
2	Czech Republic; France; Kazakhstan; Spain; United States	Canada; China; Italy; Russia	China; France; Germany; Italy; United States	France; Germany; Italy
If not listed above, one entry is allowed.

== Entries ==
All of the 2013 World champions were absent but the 2014 Olympic men's champion Yuzuru Hanyu, pairs medalists Ksenia Stolbova / Fedor Klimov and Aliona Savchenko / Robin Szolkowy, and ice dancing bronze medalists Elena Ilinykh / Nikita Katsalapov, as well as several team medalists, including Yulia Lipnitskaya, competed in Saitama.

Member nations announced the following entries:

Country	Men	Ladies	Pairs	Ice dancing
Australia		Brooklee Han		Danielle O'Brien / Gregory Merriman
Austria	Viktor Pfeifer	Kerstin Frank	Miriam Ziegler / Severin Kiefer	
Azerbaijan				Julia Zlobina / Alexei Sitnikov
Belgium	Jorik Hendrickx	Kaat Van Daele		
Belarus			Maria Paliakova / Nikita Bochkov	Viktoria Kavaliova / Yuri Bieliaiev
Bulgaria			Elizaveta Makarova / Leri Kenchadze	
Canada	Kevin Reynolds; Elladj Baldé; Nam Nguyen	Kaetlyn Osmond; Gabrielle Daleman	Meagan Duhamel / Eric Radford; Kirsten Moore-Towers / Dylan Moscovitch; Paige Lawrence / Rudi Swiegers	Kaitlyn Weaver / Andrew Poje; Alexandra Paul / Mitchell Islam; Piper Gilles / Paul Poirier
China	Yan Han	Li Zijun	Peng Cheng / Zhang Hao; Sui Wenjing / Han Cong	
Czech Republic	Tomáš Verner	Eliška Březinová		Gabriela Kubová / Matěj Novák
Denmark	Justus Strid	Anita Madsen		Laurence Fournier Beaudry / Nikolaj Sørensen
Estonia	Viktor Romanenkov	Jelena Glebova	Natalja Zabijako / Alexandr Zaboev	Irina Shtork / Taavi Rand
Finland		Juulia Turkkila		Henna Lindholm / Ossi Kanervo
France	Chafik Besseghier	Maé-Bérénice Méité	Vanessa James / Morgan Ciprès; Daria Popova / Bruno Massot	Nathalie Péchalat / Fabian Bourzat; Gabriella Papadakis / Guillaume Cizeron
Georgia				Angelina Telegina / Otar Japaridze
Germany	Peter Liebers	Nathalie Weinzierl	Aliona Savchenko / Robin Szolkowy; Maylin Wende / Daniel Wende	Tanja Kolbe / Stefano Caruso; Nelli Zhiganshina / Alexander Gazsi
(United Kingdom) Great Britain		Jenna McCorkell	Amani Fancy / Christopher Boyadji	Penny Coomes / Nicholas Buckland
Hong Kong	Ronald Lam			
Hungary				Dóra Turóczi / Balázs Major
Israel	Alexei Bychenko	Netta Schreiber		Allison Reed / Vasili Rogov
Italy	Ivan Righini	Carolina Kostner; Valentina Marchei	Stefania Berton / Ondřej Hotárek; Nicole Della Monica / Matteo Guarise	Anna Cappellini / Luca Lanotte; Charlène Guignard / Marco Fabbri
Japan	Yuzuru Hanyu; Tatsuki Machida; Takahiko Kozuka	Akiko Suzuki; Mao Asada; Kanako Murakami	Narumi Takahashi / Ryuichi Kihara	Cathy Reed / Chris Reed
Kazakhstan	Abzal Rakimgaliev			
Lithuania		Inga Janulevičiūtė		Isabella Tobias / Deividas Stagniūnas
Monaco	Kim Lucine			
Norway		Anne Line Gjersem		
Philippines	Christopher Caluza			
Poland	Maciej Cieplucha			Justyna Plutowska / Peter Gerber
Romania	Zoltán Kelemen			
Russia	Maxim Kovtun	Yulia Lipnitskaya; Anna Pogorilaya	Ksenia Stolbova / Fedor Klimov; Vera Bazarova / Yuri Larionov; Julia Antipova / Nodari Maisuradze	Elena Ilinykh / Nikita Katsalapov; Victoria Sinitsina / Ruslan Zhiganshin
Slovakia		Nicole Rajičová		Federica Testa / Lukáš Csölley
South Korea	Kim Jin-seo	Kim Hae-jin; Park So-youn		
Spain	Javier Fernández	Sonia Lafuente		Sara Hurtado / Adrià Díaz
Sweden	Alexander Majorov	Joshi Helgesson		
Switzerland	Stéphane Walker	Anna Ovcharova		Ramona Elsener / Florian Roost
Turkey				Alisa Agafonova / Alper Uçar
Ukraine	Yakov Godorozha	Natalia Popova	Julia Lavrentieva / Yuri Rudyk	
United States	Max Aaron; Jeremy Abbott	Polina Edmunds; Gracie Gold; Ashley Wagner	Marissa Castelli / Simon Shnapir; Felicia Zhang / Nathan Bartholomay	Madison Chock / Evan Bates; Maia Shibutani / Alex Shibutani; Alexandra Aldridge / Daniel Eaton
Uzbekistan	Misha Ge			

- On 3 March 2014, U.S. Figure Skating stated that Meryl Davis / Charlie White would be replaced by second alternates Alexandra Aldridge / Daniel Eaton. First alternates Madison Hubbell / Zachary Donohue are unable to compete due to injury — Hubbell sustained a torn labrum.
- On 4 March, the Spanish federation said that Javier Raya would not compete due to injury.
- On 7 March, Ukrainian ice dancers Nadezhda Frolenkova / Vitali Nikiforov withdrew due to Frolenkova's back injury.
- On 20 March, American pair Caydee Denney / John Coughlin withdrew due to Denney's ankle injury and were replaced by Felicia Zhang / Nathan Bartholomay.
- On 21 March, France's Florent Amodio withdrew from the men's event.
- On 28 March, Russia's Ekaterina Bobrova / Dmitri Soloviev withdrew before the short dance, Soloviev having sustained a groin injury in practice.
- On 29 March, the Czech Republic's Michal Březina withdrew before the men's free skating.
- On 29 March, the United Kingdom's Jenna McCorkell withdrew before the ladies' free skating due to a hamstring injury.

== Schedule ==
All dates/times are listed as local time in Japan. The Western hemisphere saw some of the events on the previous day, due to the time zone difference.

Competition schedule
Event	Program	Event date	Start time
Pairs	Short program	March 26	10:00 a.m.
Pairs	Free skating	March 27	11:30 a.m.
Men	Short program	March 26	15:45 p.m.
Men	Free skating	March 28	17:00 p.m.
Ladies	Short program	March 27	15:45 p.m.
Ladies	Free skating	March 29	17:15 p.m.
Ice dancing	Short dance	March 28	10:50 a.m.
Ice dancing	Free dance	March 29	12:30 p.m.

== Overview ==
Japan was named as the host in June 2011. Saitama was confirmed as the city in February 2013.

Olympic bronze medalists, Aliona Savchenko / Robin Szolkowy of Germany, took the lead in the pairs' short program, two points ahead of Canada's Meagan Duhamel / Eric Radford, who edged Olympic silver medalists Ksenia Stolbova / Fedor Klimov of Russia by under a point. Savchenko/Szolkowy ranked first in the free skating by a six-point margin and won their fifth World title by an overall margin of nearly nine points. Stolbova/Klimov were awarded their first World medal, silver, finishing five points ahead of Duhamel/Radford. The latter pair outscored fellow Canadians Kirsten Moore-Towers / Dylan Moscovitch for the bronze for the second year in a row.

Japan's Tatsuki Machida ranked first in the men's short program, with Spain's Javier Fernández and 2014 Olympic champion Yuzuru Hanyu in second and third respectively. Hanyu placed first in the free skating and won his first World title. Silver went to Machida, finishing 0.33 of a point behind Hanyu. Finishing six points back, Fernández won his second World bronze medal.

The ice dancing event was closely contested. Two points separated the top four in the short dance. 2014 European champions, Anna Cappellini / Luca Lanotte of Italy, took the lead, outscoring Canada's Kaitlyn Weaver / Andrew Poje by 0.5 and France's Nathalie Pechalat / Fabian Bourzat by 1.5. Slightly under three points separated the top four in the free dance and the overall scores were even closer. Cappellini/Lanotte became the second Italian ice dancers to win the World title, finishing 0.02 of a point ahead of silver medalists Weaver/Poje and 0.06 ahead of Pechalat/Bourzat, who won their second World bronze medal. 2014 Olympic bronze medalists, Elena Ilinykh / Nikita Katsalapov of Russia, placed first in the segment but finished off the podium, just 1.05 behind the gold medalists.

2008 and 2010 World champion, Mao Asada of Japan, broke the previous world record set by Kim Yuna in the short program, scoring 78.66, 1.42 points ahead of the 2012 World champion, Carolina Kostner of Italy, and 4.12 ahead of the 2014 European champion, Yulia Lipnitskaya. Asada also placed first in the free skating by a margin of five points. Lipnitskaya and Anna Pogorilaya, both 15-year-old Russians, were second and third respectively and Kostner placed sixth in the segment. Asada won her third world title by a total margin of 9.19 points, Lipnitskaya was awarded the silver medal in her first appearance at the World Championships, and Kostner took the bronze, her sixth World medal.

== Results ==
=== Men ===
Rank	Name	Nation	Total points	SP		FS	
1	Yuzuru Hanyu	Japan	282.59	3	91.24	1	191.35
2	Tatsuki Machida	Japan	282.26	1	98.21	2	184.05
3	Javier Fernández	Spain	275.93	2	96.42	3	179.51
4	Maxim Kovtun	Russia	247.37	7	84.66	5	162.71
5	Jeremy Abbott	United States	246.35	8	79.67	4	166.68
6	Takahiko Kozuka	Japan	238.02	6	85.54	6	152.48
7	Yan Han	China	231.91	5	86.70	11	145.21
8	Max Aaron	United States	225.66	9	78.32	8	147.34
9	Chafik Besseghier	France	224.19	10	76.80	7	147.39
10	Tomáš Verner	Czech Republic	223.14	4	89.08	15	134.06
11	Kevin Reynolds	Canada	215.51	15	68.52	10	146.99
12	Nam Nguyen	Canada	214.06	16	66.75	9	147.31
13	Ivan Righini	Italy	213.09	14	69.43	12	143.66
14	Peter Liebers	Germany	211.92	11	74.02	14	137.90
15	Alexei Bychenko	Israel	211.24	12	69.73	13	141.51
16	Kim Jin-seo	South Korea	202.80	13	69.56	16	133.24
17	Jorik Hendrickx	Belgium	196.78	17	65.56	18	131.22
18	Elladj Baldé	Canada	195.39	22	62.84	17	132.55
19	Christopher Caluza	Philippines	193.23	18	64.69	19	128.54
20	Abzal Rakimgaliev	Kazakhstan	183.55	24	61.77	20	121.78
21	Zoltán Kelemen	Romania	176.81	20	63.23	21	113.58
22	Maciej Cieplucha	Poland	175.97	21	63.07	22	112.90
23	Stéphane Walker	Switzerland	163.91	19	64.40	23	99.51
24	Michal Březina	Czech Republic	62.25	23	62.25	WD	
Did not advance to free skating
25	Yakov Godorozha	Ukraine		25	61.53		
26	Viktor Romanenkov	Estonia		26	61.14		
27	Misha Ge	Uzbekistan		27	60.34		
28	Ronald Lam	Hong Kong		28	60.07		
29	Kim Lucine	Monaco		29	58.19		
30	Viktor Pfeifer	Austria		30	57.17		
31	Justus Strid	Denmark		31	55.62		
32	Alexander Majorov	Sweden		32	55.61		

=== Ladies ===
Rank	Name	Nation	Total points	SP		FS	
1	Mao Asada	Japan	216.69	1	78.66	1	138.03
2	Yulia Lipnitskaya	Russia	207.50	3	74.54	2	132.96
3	Carolina Kostner	Italy	203.83	2	77.24	6	126.59
4	Anna Pogorilaya	Russia	197.50	6	66.26	3	131.24
5	Gracie Gold	United States	194.58	5	70.31	7	124.27
6	Akiko Suzuki	Japan	193.72	4	71.02	8	122.70
7	Ashley Wagner	United States	193.16	7	63.64	4	129.52
8	Polina Edmunds	United States	187.50	12	60.59	5	126.91
9	Park So-youn	South Korea	176.61	13	57.22	9	119.39
10	Kanako Murakami	Japan	172.44	10	60.86	10	111.58
11	Kaetlyn Osmond	Canada	170.64	8	62.92	13	107.72
12	Nathalie Weinzierl	Germany	167.72	11	60.82	15	106.90
13	Gabrielle Daleman	Canada	164.78	14	55.72	11	109.06
14	Joshi Helgesson	Sweden	162.91	15	54.96	12	107.95
15	Maé-Bérénice Méité	France	158.72	9	61.62	16	97.10
16	Valentina Marchei	Italy	157.64	22	50.27	14	107.37
17	Li Zijun	China	150.34	16	54.37	17	95.97
18	Eliška Březinová	Czech Republic	145.15	24	49.34	18	95.81
19	Brooklee Han	Australia	144.28	18	53.20	19	91.08
20	Anna Ovcharova	Switzerland	143.22	17	54.19	20	89.03
21	Natalia Popova	Ukraine	135.05	21	50.32	21	84.73
22	Anne Line Gjersem	Norway	130.03	23	49.48	22	80.55
23	Kim Hae-jin	South Korea	129.82	19	51.83	23	77.99
24	Jenna McCorkell	(United Kingdom) Great Britain	50.56	20	50.56	WD	
Did not advance to free skating
25	Nicole Rajičová	Slovakia		25	49.24		
26	Jelena Glebova	Estonia		26	48.09		
27	Inga Janulevičiūtė	Lithuania		27	47.20		
28	Kaat Van Daele	Belgium		28	46.05		
29	Juulia Turkkila	Finland		29	45.57		
30	Anita Madsen	Denmark		30	44.15		
31	Kerstin Frank	Austria		31	44.11		
32	Sonia Lafuente	Spain		32	43.94		
33	Netta Schreiber	Israel		33	43.39		

=== Pairs ===
Rank	Name	Nation	Total points	SP		FS	
1	Aliona Savchenko / Robin Szolkowy	Germany	224.88	1	79.02	1	145.86
2	Ksenia Stolbova / Fedor Klimov	Russia	215.92	3	76.15	2	139.77
3	Meagan Duhamel / Eric Radford	Canada	210.84	2	77.01	4	133.83
4	Kirsten Moore-Towers / Dylan Moscovitch	Canada	205.52	6	69.31	3	136.21
5	Peng Cheng / Zhang Hao	China	194.83	5	71.68	5	123.15
6	Sui Wenjing / Han Cong	China	192.10	4	72.24	9	119.86
7	Vera Bazarova / Yuri Larionov	Russia	189.44	7	67.41	6	122.03
8	Julia Antipova / Nodari Maisuradze	Russia	186.22	8	66.78	10	119.44
9	Stefania Berton / Ondřej Hotárek	Italy	184.28	10	62.73	7	121.55
10	Vanessa James / Morgan Ciprès	France	183.90	9	64.01	8	119.89
11	Marissa Castelli / Simon Shnapir	United States	170.90	11	60.60	11	110.30
12	Paige Lawrence / Rudi Swiegers	Canada	168.88	12	59.84	12	109.04
13	Maylin Wende / Daniel Wende	Germany	159.42	13	58.19	13	101.23
14	Felicia Zhang / Nathan Bartholomay	United States	151.78	14	57.59	14	94.19
15	Daria Popova / Bruno Massot	France	142.00	15	52.50	15	89.50
16	Nicole Della Monica / Matteo Guarise	Italy	139.30	16	51.38	16	87.92
Did not advance to free skating
17	Narumi Takahashi / Ryuichi Kihara	Japan		17	49.54		
18	Amani Fancy / Christopher Boyadji	(United Kingdom) Great Britain		18	46.96		
19	Natalja Zabijako / Alexandr Zaboev	Estonia		19	46.11		
20	Maria Paliakova / Nikita Bochkov	Belarus		20	45.29		
21	Julia Lavrentieva / Yuri Rudyk	Ukraine		21	44.20		
22	Miriam Ziegler / Severin Kiefer	Austria		22	44.06		
23	Elizaveta Makarova / Leri Kenchadze	Bulgaria		23	42.86		

=== Ice dancing ===
Rank	Name	Nation	Total points	SD		FD	
1	Anna Cappellini / Luca Lanotte	Italy	175.43	1	69.70	4	105.73
2	Kaitlyn Weaver / Andrew Poje	Canada	175.41	2	69.20	3	106.21
3	Nathalie Péchalat / Fabian Bourzat	France	175.37	3	68.20	2	107.17
4	Elena Ilinykh / Nikita Katsalapov	Russia	174.38	5	65.67	1	108.71
5	Madison Chock / Evan Bates	United States	167.59	4	67.71	5	99.88
6	Maia Shibutani / Alex Shibutani	United States	158.57	6	63.55	6	95.02
7	Victoria Sinitsina / Ruslan Zhiganshin	Russia	155.35	8	62.11	8	93.24
8	Piper Gilles / Paul Poirier	Canada	153.86	10	59.42	7	94.44
9	Penny Coomes / Nicholas Buckland	(United Kingdom) Great Britain	153.66	9	61.21	9	92.45
10	Alexandra Paul / Mitchell Islam	Canada	148.76	11	57.68	10	91.08
11	Nelli Zhiganshina / Alexander Gazsi	Germany	148.37	7	62.27	14	86.10
12	Julia Zlobina / Alexei Sitnikov	Azerbaijan	145.24	12	57.01	11	88.23
13	Gabriella Papadakis / Guillaume Cizeron	France	141.49	15	55.11	13	86.38
14	Charlène Guignard / Marco Fabbri	Italy	140.77	17	53.98	12	86.79
15	Isabella Tobias / Deividas Stagniūnas	Lithuania	140.72	13	55.37	15	85.35
16	Sara Hurtado / Adrià Díaz	Spain	137.47	16	55.06	17	82.41
17	Alexandra Aldridge / Daniel Eaton	United States	137.37	18	53.34	16	84.03
18	Cathy Reed / Chris Reed	Japan	136.13	14	55.18	18	80.95
19	Irina Shtork / Taavi Rand	Estonia	130.38	20	53.03	19	77.35
20	Alisa Agafonova / Alper Uçar	Turkey	124.02	19	53.07	20	70.95
Did not advance to free skating
21	Tanja Kolbe / Stefano Caruso	Germany		21	52.08		
22	Justyna Plutowska / Peter Gerber	Poland		22	51.99		
23	Federica Testa / Lukáš Csölley	Slovakia		23	51.56		
24	Danielle O'Brien / Gregory Merriman	Australia		24	51.06		
25	Ramona Elsener / Florian Roost	Switzerland		25	50.64		
26	Henna Lindholm / Ossi Kanervo	Finland		26	50.61		
27	Gabriela Kubová / Matěj Novák	Czech Republic		27	50.43		
28	Dóra Turóczi / Balázs Major	Hungary		28	48.49		
29	Laurence Fournier Beaudry / Nikolaj Sørensen	Denmark		29	48.46		
30	Allison Reed / Vasili Rogov	Israel		30	46.05		
31	Angelina Telegina / Otar Japaridze	Georgia		31	42.85		
32	Viktoria Kavaliova / Yuri Bieliaiev	Belarus		32	41.08		
WD	Ekaterina Bobrova / Dmitri Soloviev	Russia					

== Medals summary ==
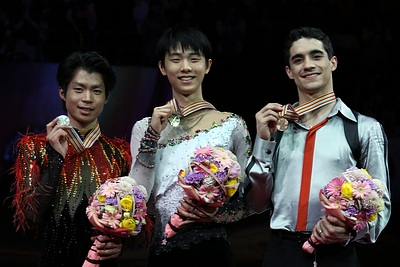
The men's medalists

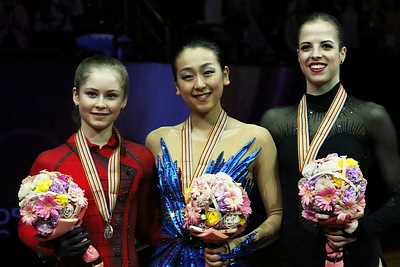
The ladies' medalists

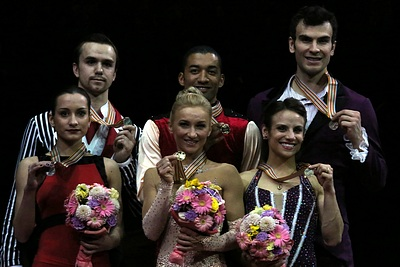
The pairs medalists

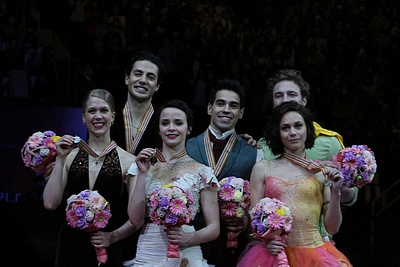
The ice dancing medalists

=== Medalists ===
Medals for overall placement:

Discipline	Gold	Silver	Bronze
Men	(Japan) Yuzuru Hanyu	(Japan) Tatsuki Machida	(Spain) Javier Fernández
Ladies	(Japan) Mao Asada	(Russia) Yulia Lipnitskaya	(Italy) Carolina Kostner
Pairs	(Germany) Aliona Savchenko / Robin Szolkowy	(Russia) Ksenia Stolbova / Fedor Klimov	(Canada) Meagan Duhamel / Eric Radford
Ice dancing	(Italy) Anna Cappellini / Luca Lanotte	(Canada) Kaitlyn Weaver / Andrew Poje	(France) Nathalie Péchalat / Fabian Bourzat

Small medals for placement in the short segment:

Discipline	Gold	Silver	Bronze
Men	(Japan) Tatsuki Machida	(Spain) Javier Fernández	(Japan) Yuzuru Hanyu
Ladies	(Japan) Mao Asada	(Italy) Carolina Kostner	(Russia) Yulia Lipnitskaya
Pairs	(Germany) Aliona Savchenko / Robin Szolkowy	(Canada) Meagan Duhamel / Eric Radford	(Russia) Ksenia Stolbova / Fedor Klimov
Ice dancing	(Italy) Anna Cappellini / Luca Lanotte	(Canada) Kaitlyn Weaver / Andrew Poje	(France) Nathalie Péchalat / Fabian Bourzat

Small medals for placement in the free segment:

Discipline	Gold	Silver	Bronze
Men	(Japan) Yuzuru Hanyu	(Japan) Tatsuki Machida	(Spain) Javier Fernández
Ladies	(Japan) Mao Asada	(Russia) Yulia Lipnitskaya	(Russia) Anna Pogorilaya
Pairs	(Germany) Aliona Savchenko / Robin Szolkowy	(Russia) Ksenia Stolbova / Fedor Klimov	(Canada) Kirsten Moore-Towers / Dylan Moscovitch
Ice dancing	(Russia) Elena Ilinykh / Nikita Katsalapov	(France) Nathalie Péchalat / Fabian Bourzat	(Canada) Kaitlyn Weaver / Andrew Poje

=== Medals by country ===
Table of medals for overall placement:

Rank	Nation	Gold	Silver	Bronze	Total
1	Japan (JPN)	2	1	0	3
2	Italy (ITA)	1	0	1	2
3	Germany (GER)	1	0	0	1
4	Russia (RUS)	0	2	0	2
5	Canada (CAN)	0	1	1	2
6	France (FRA)	0	0	1	1
6	Spain (ESP)	0	0	1	1
Totals (7 entries)		4	4	4	12
