= Peter Gerber (ice dancer) =

Polish ice dancer

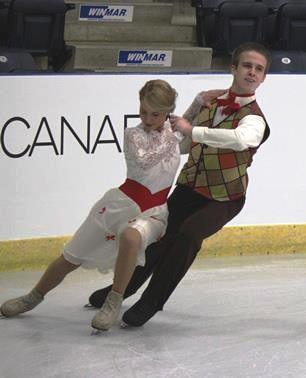
- Gerber with Plutowska in 2013

Personal information
- Born: March 16, 1992 (age 34) Etobicoke, Ontario, Canada
- Height: 1.80 m (5 ft 11 in)

Figure skating career
- Country: Poland
- Coach: Igor Shpilband
- Skating club: GKS Stoczniowiec Gdańsk
- Began skating: 2001

Peter Gerber (born March 16, 1992) is a competitive ice dancer. Competing for Poland, (with former partner Justyna Plutowska), he is the 2013 Finlandia Trophy bronze medalist and 2014 Bavarian Open champion.

== Personal life ==
Peter Gerber is a retired competitive Ice Dancer of Poland. Born March 16, 1992 in Etobicoke, Ontario, Canada. He is a 2010 recipient of the Overcoming Adversity Achievement Award from Skate Canada. He holds dual Canadian and Polish citizenship. He is married to his ice skating partner Mariyah Gerber since 2018.

== Career ==
Gerber began skating at the age of six or seven. He teamed up with Baily Carroll in 2001. They represented Canada until 2009 and then Poland starting in 2010. In the 2008–09 season, Gerber broke his leg and Carroll her wrist. Carroll/Gerber won the 2011 Polish national junior title and were assigned to the 2011 World Junior Championships where they placed 22nd. They parted ways in September 2011.

Gerber teamed up with Justyna Plutowska in June 2012. They were coached by Igor Shpilband in Novi, Michigan and represented GKS Stoczniowiec Gdańsk. Plutowska/Gerber made their debut at the 2012 U.S. International Classic, finishing 8th. They took the silver medal at the 2013 Polish Championships and placed 27th at the 2013 World Championships.

In the 2013–14 season, Plutowska/Gerber placed 9th at the U.S. International Classic before competing at the 2013 Nebelhorn Trophy, the final Olympic qualifier. They were 14th in the short dance and 8th in the free dance, finishing 10th overall at Nebelhorn and becoming second alternates for a spot at the 2014 Winter Olympics. Plutowska/Gerber won their first international medal, bronze, at the 2013 Finlandia Trophy one week later. They reached the free dance at the 2014 European Championships in Bratislava and finished 16th overall. After taking gold at the 2014 Bavarian Open in February, the two competed at the 2014 World Championships, held in Saitama, Japan in March, and finished 22nd. Their partnership ended suddenly in early May 2014, when Plutowska decided to leave skating for personal reasons.

In the 2015-16 season, Gerber retired from competitive ice dance to pursue a career in professional show skating.

== Programs ==
=== With Plutowska ===
| Season | Short dance | Free dance |
|---|---|---|
| 2013–2014 | Le Jazz Hot | The Artist by Ludovic Bource |
| 2012–2013 | Mary Poppins: Chim Cher-ee; Supercalifragilisticexpialidocious | The Artist by Ludovic Bource |

=== With Carroll ===
| Season | Short dance | Free dance |
|---|---|---|
| 2010–2011 | My Sweet and Tender Beast by Eugen Doga | Mumuki; Primavera Portena by Astor Piazzolla |

== Competitive highlights ==
=== With Plutowska ===
International
| Event | 2012–13 | 2013–14 |
|---|---|---|
| World Championships | 27th | 22nd |
| European Championships | | 16th |
| Bavarian Open | | 1st |
| Crystal Skate of Romania | 6th | |
| Ice Challenge | 8th | |
| Finlandia Trophy | 7th | 3rd |
| Nebelhorn Trophy | | 10th |
| Toruń Cup | 5th | |
| U.S. Classic | 8th | 9th |
National
| Polish Championships | 2nd | 1st |

=== With Carroll ===
International
| Event | 2007–08 | 2008–09 | 2009–10 | 2010–11 | 2011–12 |
|---|---|---|---|---|---|
| World Junior Champ. | | | | 22nd J. | |
| JGP Austria | | | | WD | |
| JGP Latvia | | | | | 12th J. |
| JGP Poland | | | | | 12th J. |
| JGP Romania | | | | 10th J. | |
National
| Polish Championships | | | | 1st J. | |
| Canadian Championships | | 6th N. | 4th N. | | |
| Central Ontario Sectionals | | 1st N. | 3rd N. | | |
| Skate Canada Challenge | | | 4th N. | | |
| SC Eastern Challenge | 5th PN. | 1st N. | | | |
JGP = Junior Grand Prix; WD = Withdrew; Levels: J. = Junior; N. = Novice; PN. = Pre-Novice
