= 2013 World Figure Skating Championships =

Annual figure skating competition held in 2013

- Type: ISU Championship
- Date: March 11 – 17
- Season: 2012–13
- Location: London, Ontario, Canada
- Host: Skate Canada
- Venue: Budweiser Gardens

Champions
- Men's singles: (Canada) Patrick Chan
- Ladies' singles: (South Korea) Kim Yuna
- Pairs: (Russia) Tatiana Volosozhar / Maxim Trankov
- Ice dance: (United States) Meryl Davis / Charlie White
- Previous: 2012 World Championships
- Next: 2014 World Championships

The 2013 World Figure Skating Championships was an international figure skating competition in the 2012–13 season. The event was held at the Budweiser Gardens in London, Ontario, Canada on March 11–17. Medals were awarded in the disciplines of men's singles, ladies' singles, pair skating, and ice dancing. The event also determined the number of entries a country may send to the 2014 World Championships and 2014 Winter Olympics.

== Host ==
The International Skating Union selected London as the host in June 2010. Canada most recently organized the event in 2006 in Calgary, Alberta. The cost of the 2013 event was estimated at CDN $12 million. It was held at the Budweiser Gardens. Total economic activity generated in Ontario by the event was CDN $42.6 million ($32.1 million in London), resulting in net economic activity (GDP) of $23.2 million ($17.2 million in London).

== Qualification ==
Skaters were eligible for the event if they were representing an ISU member nations and had reached the age of 15 before 1 July 2012 in their place of birth. National associations selected their entries according to their own criteria but the ISU mandated that their selections achieve a minimum technical elements score (TES) at an international event prior to the World Championships.

=== Minimum TES ===
Minimum technical scores (TES)
Discipline	SP / SD	FS / FD
Men	32	60
Ladies	26	46
Pairs	24	41
Ice dancing	29	39
Must be achieved at an ISU-recognized international event in the ongoing or preceding season. SP and FS scores may be attained at different events.

=== Number of entries per discipline ===
Based on the results of the 2012 World Championships, the ISU allowed each country one to three entries per discipline.

Spots	Men	Ladies	Pairs	Dance
3	Canada; France; Japan	Italy; Japan; Russia	China; Russia	Canada; Russia; United States
2	Czech Republic; Italy; Kazakhstan; Spain; United States	China; Georgia; United States	Canada; Germany; Italy; Japan; United States	France; Italy
If not listed above, one entry was allowed.

== Entries ==
Member nations submitted the following entries:

Country	Men	Ladies	Pairs	Ice dancing
Australia		Brooklee Han		
Austria	Viktor Pfeifer	Kerstin Frank		
Azerbaijan				Julia Zlobina / Alexei Sitnikov
Belarus	Pavel Ignatenko			Viktoria Kavaliova / Yurii Bieliaiev
Belgium	Jorik Hendrickx	Kaat Van Daele		
Brazil		Isadora Williams		
Bulgaria			Elizaveta Makarova / Leri Kenchadze	
Canada	Patrick Chan; Kevin Reynolds; Andrei Rogozine	Kaetlyn Osmond	Meagan Duhamel / Eric Radford; Kirsten Moore-Towers / Dylan Moscovitch	Tessa Virtue / Scott Moir; Piper Gilles / Paul Poirier; Kaitlyn Weaver / Andrew Poje
China	Song Nan	Li Zijun; Zhang Kexin	Pang Qing / Tong Jian; Peng Cheng / Zhang Hao; Sui Wenjing / Han Cong	
Czech Republic	Michal Březina; Tomáš Verner			Lucie Myslivečková / Neil Brown
Denmark	Justus Strid	Anita Madsen		
Estonia	Viktor Romanenkov	Jelena Glebova		Irina Shtork / Taavi Rand
Finland		Juulia Turkkila		Olesia Karmi / Max Lindholm
France	Florent Amodio; Brian Joubert	Maé Bérénice Méité	Vanessa James / Morgan Ciprès	Pernelle Carron / Lloyd Jones; Nathalie Péchalat / Fabian Bourzat
Georgia		Elene Gedevanishvili		
Germany	Peter Liebers	Nathalie Weinzierl	Aliona Savchenko / Robin Szolkowy; Mari Vartmann / Aaron Van Cleave	Nelli Zhiganshina / Alexander Gazsi
(United Kingdom) Great Britain		Jenna McCorkell	Stacey Kemp / David King	Penny Coomes / Nicholas Buckland
Hong Kong	Ronald Lam			
Hungary				Zsuzsanna Nagy / Máté Fejes
Israel	Alexei Bychenko			Allison Reed / Vasili Rogov
Italy	Paolo Bacchini; Paul Bonifacio Parkinson	Carol Bressanutti; Carolina Kostner; Valentina Marchei	Stefania Berton / Ondřej Hotárek; Nicole Della Monica / Matteo Guarise	Anna Cappellini / Luca Lanotte; Charlène Guignard / Marco Fabbri
Japan	Yuzuru Hanyu; Takahito Mura; Daisuke Takahashi	Mao Asada; Kanako Murakami; Akiko Suzuki		Cathy Reed / Chris Reed
Kazakhstan	Abzal Rakimgaliev; Denis Ten			
Latvia		Alina Fjodorova		
Lithuania		Inga Janulevičiūtė		Isabella Tobias / Deividas Stagniūnas
Monaco	Kim Lucine			
Norway		Anne Line Gjersem		
Philippines	Christopher Caluza			
Poland	Maciej Cieplucha		Magdalena Klatka / Radosław Chruściński	Justyna Plutowska / Peter Gerber
Romania	Zoltán Kelemen			
Russia	Maxim Kovtun	Alena Leonova; Adelina Sotnikova; Elizaveta Tuktamysheva	Vera Bazarova / Yuri Larionov; Yuko Kavaguti / Alexander Smirnov; Tatiana Volosozhar / Maxim Trankov	Ekaterina Bobrova / Dmitri Soloviev; Elena Ilinykh / Nikita Katsalapov; Ekaterina Riazanova / Ilia Tkachenko
Slovakia		Monika Simančíková		Federica Testa / Lukas Csolley
Slovenia		Patricia Gleščič		
South Korea	Kim Jin-seo	Kim Yuna		
Spain	Javier Fernández	Sonia Lafuente		Sara Hurtado / Adrià Díaz
Sweden	Alexander Majorov	Viktoria Helgesson		
Switzerland		Tina Stuerzinger		
Turkey				Alisa Agafonova / Alper Ucar
Ukraine	Yakov Godorozha	Natalia Popova		Siobhan Heekin-Canedy / Dmitri Dun
United States	Max Aaron; Ross Miner	Gracie Gold; Ashley Wagner	Marissa Castelli / Simon Shnapir; Alexa Scimeca / Chris Knierim	Madison Chock / Evan Bates; Meryl Davis / Charlie White; Maia Shibutani / Alex Shibutani
Uzbekistan	Misha Ge			

== Schedule ==
- Wednesday, March 13
  - 11:00 – Pairs' short
  - 15:45 – Opening ceremony, Men's short
- Thursday, March 14
  - 10:30 – Ladies' short
  - 17:15 – Short dance
- Friday, March 15
  - 11:45 – Pairs' free, including victory ceremony
  - 17:45 – Men's free, including victory ceremony
- Saturday, March 16
  - 14:30 – Free dance, including victory ceremony
  - 19:00 – Ladies' free, including victory ceremony
- Sunday, March 17
  - 14:00 – Exhibitions

== Results ==
=== Men ===
Rank	Name	Nation	Total points	SP		FS	
1	Patrick Chan	Canada	267.78	1	98.37	2	169.41
2	Denis Ten	Kazakhstan	266.48	2	91.56	1	174.92
3	Javier Fernández	Spain	249.06	7	80.76	4	168.30
4	Yuzuru Hanyu	Japan	244.99	9	75.94	3	169.05
5	Kevin Reynolds	Canada	239.98	3	85.16	7	154.82
6	Daisuke Takahashi	Japan	239.03	4	84.67	8	154.36
7	Max Aaron	United States	238.36	8	78.20	6	160.16
8	Takahito Mura	Japan	234.18	11	73.46	5	160.72
9	Brian Joubert	France	232.26	5	84.17	10	148.09
10	Michal Březina	Czech Republic	229.00	6	83.09	11	145.91
11	Peter Liebers	Germany	216.84	13	71.20	12	145.64
12	Florent Amodio	France	216.83	10	75.73	15	141.10
13	Andrei Rogozine	Canada	216.60	18	67.35	9	149.25
14	Ross Miner	United States	211.90	14	70.24	13	141.66
15	Song Nan	China	207.68	12	73.03	18	134.65
16	Misha Ge	Uzbekistan	207.50	15	68.45	16	139.05
17	Maxim Kovtun	Russia	207.40	19	65.85	14	141.55
18	Alexander Majorov	Sweden	204.29	16	68.32	17	135.97
19	Jorik Hendrickx	Belgium	192.19	23	62.04	19	130.15
20	Viktor Pfeifer	Austria	189.44	21	64.10	20	125.34
21	Tomáš Verner	Czech Republic	180.50	17	68.05	22	112.45
22	Viktor Romanenkov	Estonia	177.09	20	65.33	23	111.76
23	Yakov Godorozha	Ukraine	174.98	24	61.88	21	113.10
24	Justus Strid	Denmark	165.23	22	63.25	24	101.98
Did not advance to free skating
25	Maciej Cieplucha	Poland		25	60.96		
26	Kim Jin-seo	South Korea		26	60.75		
27	Paolo Bacchini	Italy		27	60.31		
28	Abzal Rakimgaliev	Kazakhstan		28	59.14		
29	Zoltán Kelemen	Romania		29	58.24		
30	Ronald Lam	Hong Kong		30	57.94		
31	Alexei Bychenko	Israel		31	57.53		
32	Kim Lucine	Monaco		32	57.35		
33	Paul Bonifacio Parkinson	Italy		33	51.54		
34	Christopher Caluza	Philippines		34	49.15		
WD	Pavel Ignatenko	Belarus		WD			

=== Ladies ===
Rank	Name	Nation	Total points	SP		FS	
1	Kim Yuna	South Korea	218.31	1	69.97	1	148.34
2	Carolina Kostner	Italy	197.89	2	66.86	3	131.03
3	Mao Asada	Japan	196.47	6	62.10	2	134.37
4	Kanako Murakami	Japan	189.73	3	66.64	7	123.09
5	Ashley Wagner	United States	187.34	5	63.98	6	123.36
6	Gracie Gold	United States	184.25	9	58.85	5	125.40
7	Li Zijun	China	183.85	12	56.31	4	127.54
8	Kaetlyn Osmond	Canada	176.82	4	64.73	10	112.09
9	Adelina Sotnikova	Russia	175.98	8	59.62	9	116.36
10	Elizaveta Tuktamysheva	Russia	174.24	14	54.72	8	119.52
11	Maé Bérénice Méité	France	165.03	11	56.90	11	108.13
12	Akiko Suzuki	Japan	164.59	7	61.17	13	103.42
13	Alena Leonova	Russia	159.06	13	56.30	14	102.76
14	Viktoria Helgesson	Sweden	158.80	10	58.36	15	100.44
15	Natalia Popova	Ukraine	155.52	17	51.67	12	103.85
16	Jelena Glebova	Estonia	152.49	15	54.59	16	97.90
17	Monika Simančíková	Slovakia	149.02	19	51.18	17	97.84
18	Valentina Marchei	Italy	147.23	21	50.41	18	96.82
19	Nathalie Weinzierl	Germany	142.48	24	48.14	19	94.34
20	Jenna McCorkell	(United Kingdom) Great Britain	142.27	18	51.23	21	91.04
21	Brooklee Han	Australia	141.88	20	50.62	20	91.26
22	Sonia Lafuente	Spain	139.66	16	52.44	23	87.22
23	Zhang Kexin	China	137.41	23	48.80	22	88.61
24	Kerstin Frank	Austria	127.98	22	49.66	24	78.32
Did not advance to free skating
25	Isadora Williams	Brazil		25	46.63		
26	Anita Madsen	Denmark		26	46.16		
27	Carol Bressanutti	Italy		27	44.51		
28	Kaat Van Daele	Belgium		28	42.51		
29	Elene Gedevanishvili	Georgia		29	42.40		
30	Tina Stuerzinger	Switzerland		30	42.36		
31	Juulia Turkkila	Finland		31	40.70		
32	Anne Line Gjersem	Norway		32	38.53		
33	Inga Janulevičiūtė	Lithuania		33	36.79		
34	Patricia Gleščič	Slovenia		34	36.66		
35	Alina Fjodorova	Latvia		35	36.44		

=== Pairs ===
Rank	Name	Nation	Total points	SP		FS	
1	Tatiana Volosozhar / Maxim Trankov	Russia	225.71	1	75.84	1	149.87
2	Aliona Savchenko / Robin Szolkowy	Germany	205.56	3	73.47	2	132.09
3	Meagan Duhamel / Eric Radford	Canada	204.56	2	73.61	3	130.95
4	Kirsten Moore-Towers / Dylan Moscovitch	Canada	199.50	5	69.25	5	130.25
5	Pang Qing / Tong Jian	China	194.64	6	63.95	4	130.69
6	Yuko Kavaguti / Alexander Smirnov	Russia	191.59	4	69.98	7	121.61
7	Vera Bazarova / Yuri Larionov	Russia	184.72	7	61.91	6	122.81
8	Vanessa James / Morgan Ciprès	France	180.17	8	60.98	8	119.19
9	Alexa Scimeca / Chris Knierim	United States	173.51	12	55.73	9	117.78
10	Stefania Berton / Ondřej Hotárek	Italy	171.77	9	59.07	10	112.70
11	Peng Cheng / Zhang Hao	China	167.18	10	58.52	11	108.66
12	Sui Wenjing / Han Cong	China	165.89	11	57.65	13	108.24
13	Marissa Castelli / Simon Shnapir	United States	164.00	13	55.68	12	108.32
14	Nicole Della Monica / Matteo Guarise	Italy	136.03	15	47.82	14	88.21
15	Stacey Kemp / David King	(United Kingdom) Great Britain	133.56	14	48.60	16	84.96
16	Mari Vartmann / Aaron Van Cleave	Germany	133.12	16	47.36	15	85.76
Did not advance to free skating
17	Elizaveta Makarova / Leri Kenchadze	Bulgaria		17	36.48		
18	Magdalena Klatka / Radosław Chruściński	Poland		18	35.44		

=== Ice dancing ===
Rank	Name	Nation	Total points	SD		FD	
1	Meryl Davis / Charlie White	United States	189.56	1	77.12	1	112.44
2	Tessa Virtue / Scott Moir	Canada	185.04	2	73.87	2	111.17
3	Ekaterina Bobrova / Dmitri Soloviev	Russia	169.19	3	70.05	4	99.14
4	Anna Cappellini / Luca Lanotte	Italy	168.04	5	67.93	3	100.11
5	Kaitlyn Weaver / Andrew Poje	Canada	166.20	6	67.54	5	98.66
6	Nathalie Péchalat / Fabian Bourzat	France	165.60	4	69.65	7	95.95
7	Madison Chock / Evan Bates	United States	163.93	7	66.74	6	97.19
8	Maia Shibutani / Alex Shibutani	United States	157.71	8	66.14	9	91.57
9	Elena Ilinykh / Nikita Katsalapov	Russia	157.52	9	66.07	10	91.45
10	Nelli Zhiganshina / Alexander Gazsi	Germany	154.27	11	60.59	8	93.68
11	Ekaterina Riazanova / Ilia Tkachenko	Russia	149.78	13	59.52	11	90.26
12	Pernelle Carron / Lloyd Jones	France	145.98	12	60.58	12	85.40
13	Penny Coomes / Nicholas Buckland	(United Kingdom) Great Britain	145.71	10	63.66	17	82.05
14	Siobhan Heekin-Canedy / Dmitri Dun	Ukraine	141.88	14	59.20	16	82.68
15	Isabella Tobias / Deividas Stagniūnas	Lithuania	141.64	18	57.39	13	84.25
16	Julia Zlobina / Alexei Sitnikov	Azerbaijan	141.44	17	57.80	14	83.64
17	Charlene Guignard / Marco Fabbri	Italy	140.95	16	57.89	15	83.06
18	Piper Gilles / Paul Poirier	Canada	140.02	15	58.61	18	81.41
19	Sara Hurtado / Adrià Díaz	Spain	131.28	20	53.12	19	78.16
20	Cathy Reed / Chris Reed	Japan	129.94	19	53.95	20	75.99
Did not advance to free dance
21	Lucie Myslivečková / Neil Brown	Czech Republic		21	51.82		
22	Olesia Karmi / Max Lindholm	Finland		22	48.06		
23	Allison Reed / Vasili Rogov	Israel		23	46.63		
24	Zsuzsanna Nagy / Máté Fejes	Hungary		24	45.60		
25	Irina Shtork / Taavi Rand	Estonia		25	45.29		
26	Federica Testa / Lukáš Csölley	Slovakia		26	44.73		
27	Justyna Plutowska / Peter Gerber	Poland		27	44.00		
28	Alisa Agafonova / Alper Uçar	Turkey		28	43.98		
29	Viktoria Kavaliova / Yurii Bieliaiev	Belarus		29	32.50		

== Medals summary ==
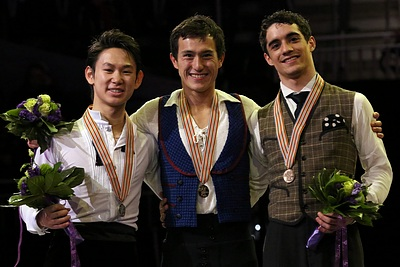
The men's medalists

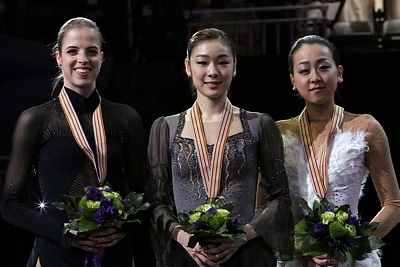
The ladies' medalists

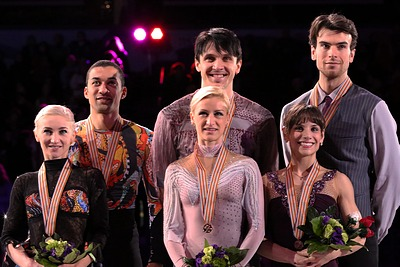
The pairs medalists

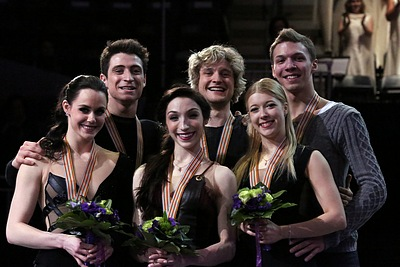
The ice dancing medalists

=== Medalists ===
Medals for overall placement:

Discipline	Gold	Silver	Bronze
Men	(Canada) Patrick Chan	(Kazakhstan) Denis Ten	(Spain) Javier Fernández
Ladies	(South Korea) Kim Yuna	(Italy) Carolina Kostner	(Japan) Mao Asada
Pairs	(Russia) Tatiana Volosozhar / Maxim Trankov	(Germany) Aliona Savchenko / Robin Szolkowy	(Canada) Meagan Duhamel / Eric Radford
Ice dancing	(United States) Meryl Davis / Charlie White	(Canada) Tessa Virtue / Scott Moir	(Russia) Ekaterina Bobrova / Dmitri Soloviev

Small medals for placement in the short segment:

Discipline	Gold	Silver	Bronze
Men	(Canada) Patrick Chan	(Kazakhstan) Denis Ten	(Canada) Kevin Reynolds
Ladies	(South Korea) Kim Yuna	(Italy) Carolina Kostner	(Japan) Kanako Murakami
Pairs	(Russia) Tatiana Volosozhar / Maxim Trankov	(Canada) Meagan Duhamel / Eric Radford	(Germany) Aliona Savchenko / Robin Szolkowy
Ice dancing	(United States) Meryl Davis / Charlie White	(Canada) Tessa Virtue / Scott Moir	(Russia) Ekaterina Bobrova / Dmitri Soloviev

Small medals for placement in the free segment:

Discipline	Gold	Silver	Bronze
Men	(Kazakhstan) Denis Ten	(Canada) Patrick Chan	(Japan) Yuzuru Hanyu
Ladies	(South Korea) Kim Yuna	(Japan) Mao Asada	(Italy) Carolina Kostner
Pairs	(Russia) Tatiana Volosozhar / Maxim Trankov	(Germany) Aliona Savchenko / Robin Szolkowy	(Canada) Meagan Duhamel / Eric Radford
Ice dancing	(United States) Meryl Davis / Charlie White	(Canada) Tessa Virtue / Scott Moir	(Italy) Anna Cappellini / Luca Lanotte

=== Medals by country ===
Table of medals for overall placement:

Rank	Nation	Gold	Silver	Bronze	Total
1	Canada (CAN)	1	1	1	3
2	Russia (RUS)	1	0	1	2
3	South Korea (KOR)	1	0	0	1
3	United States (USA)	1	0	0	1
5	Germany (GER)	0	1	0	1
5	Italy (ITA)	0	1	0	1
5	Kazakhstan (KAZ)	0	1	0	1
8	Japan (JPN)	0	0	1	1
8	Spain (ESP)	0	0	1	1
Totals (9 entries)		4	4	4	12
