= Jérémie Flemin =

French-Polish ice dancer

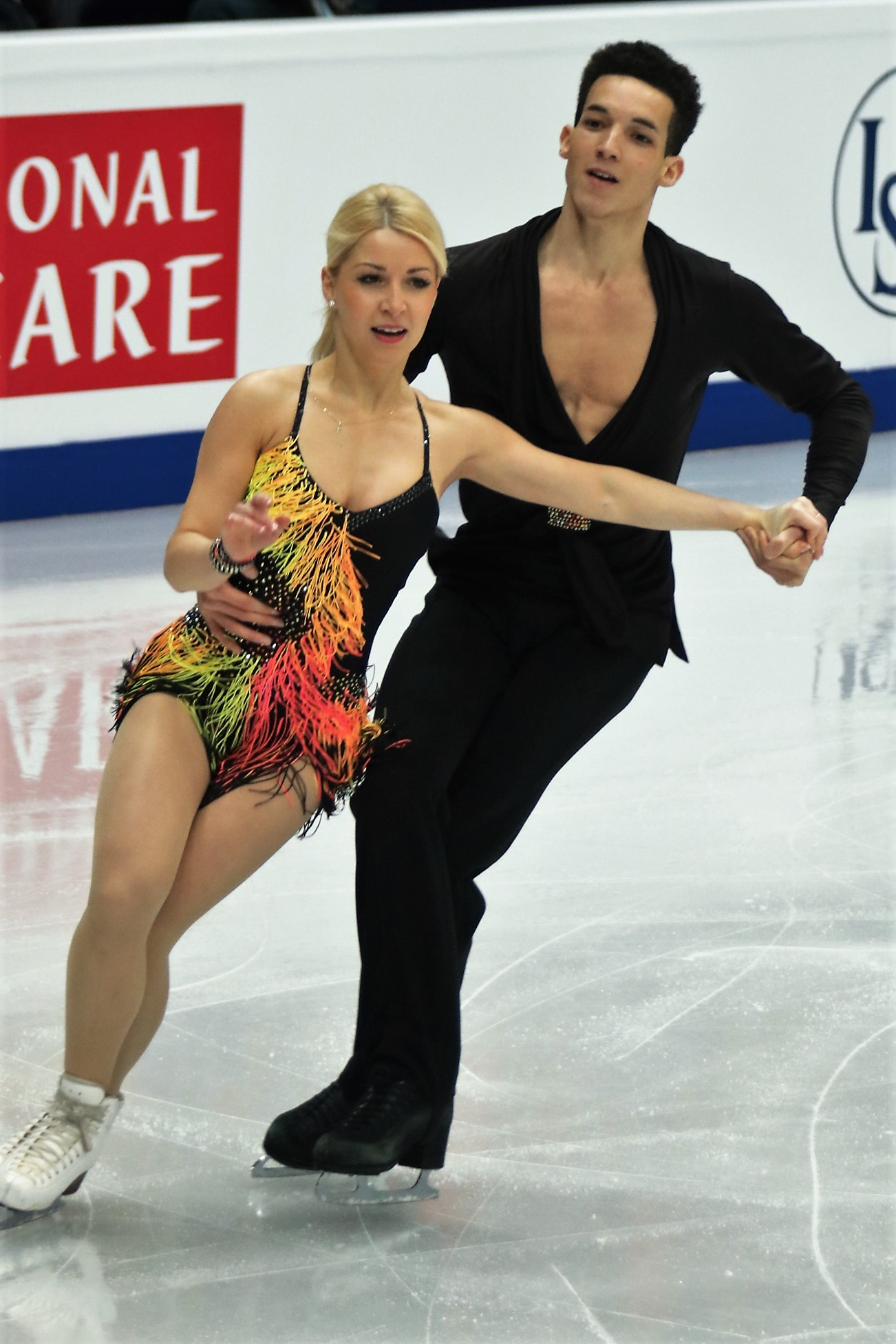
- Flemin with Plutowska at the 2018 European Championships

Personal information
- Born: 15 November 1991 (age 34) Apt, France
- Height: 1.76 m (5 ft 9 1/2 in)

Figure skating career
- Country: Poland
- Partner: Justyna Plutowska
- Coach: Romain Haguenauer, Marie-France Dubreuil, Patrice Lauzon
- Skating club: GKS Stoczniowiec Gdańsk
- Began skating: 1997
- Retired: November 7, 2020

Medal record
Representing Switzerland
Swiss Championships
| Bronze medal – third place | 2015 Lugano | Ice dance |

Jérémie Flemin (born 15 November 1991) is a retired French-Polish ice dancer.

== Career ==
=== Partnership with Plutowska ===
Flemin teamed up with Polish ice dancer Justyna Plutowska in May 2016. They decided to represent Poland and debuted their partnership at the 2016 CS Lombardia Trophy, finishing 6th. The two are coached by Barbara Fusar-Poli and Stefano Caruso in Milan, Italy.

Plutowska/Flemin withdrew after the short dance from the 2017 Four Nationals due to a hernia in his back. In 2018 they achieved silver at Polish nationals.

In June 2018 Plutowska/Flemin moved to Montreal, where they are coached at Gadbois Centre by Romain Haguenauer, Patrice Lauzon and Marie-France Dubreuil.

On October 11, 2019, he officially received Polish citizenship, enabling him participation in the Olympic Games.

== Programs ==
=== With Plutowska ===
| Season | Rhythm dance | Free dance |
|---|---|---|
| 2018–19 | Tango: Juguete Rabioso by La Chicama; Flamenco: Duende by Bozzio Levin Stevens | Love is a Bitch; Same Old Song (S.O.S. Part 1); I Feel Like I'm Drowning by Two Feet |
| 2017–18 | Samba: Bango Boom by DJ Maksy; Rhumba: Paxi Ni Ngongo by Bonga; Samba: Locuraleza by Oma | Ghost: The Musical medley Overture "Unchained Melody" I Had a Life |
| 2016–17 | Blues: A Woman's Worth by Alicia Keys; Hip hop: Recess (Milo and Otis remix) by Skrillex and Kill the Noise | The Great Gig in the Sky; Hey You by Pink Floyd; Miss You by The Rolling Stones |

== Competitive highlights ==
CS: Challenger Series

=== With Plutowska for Poland ===
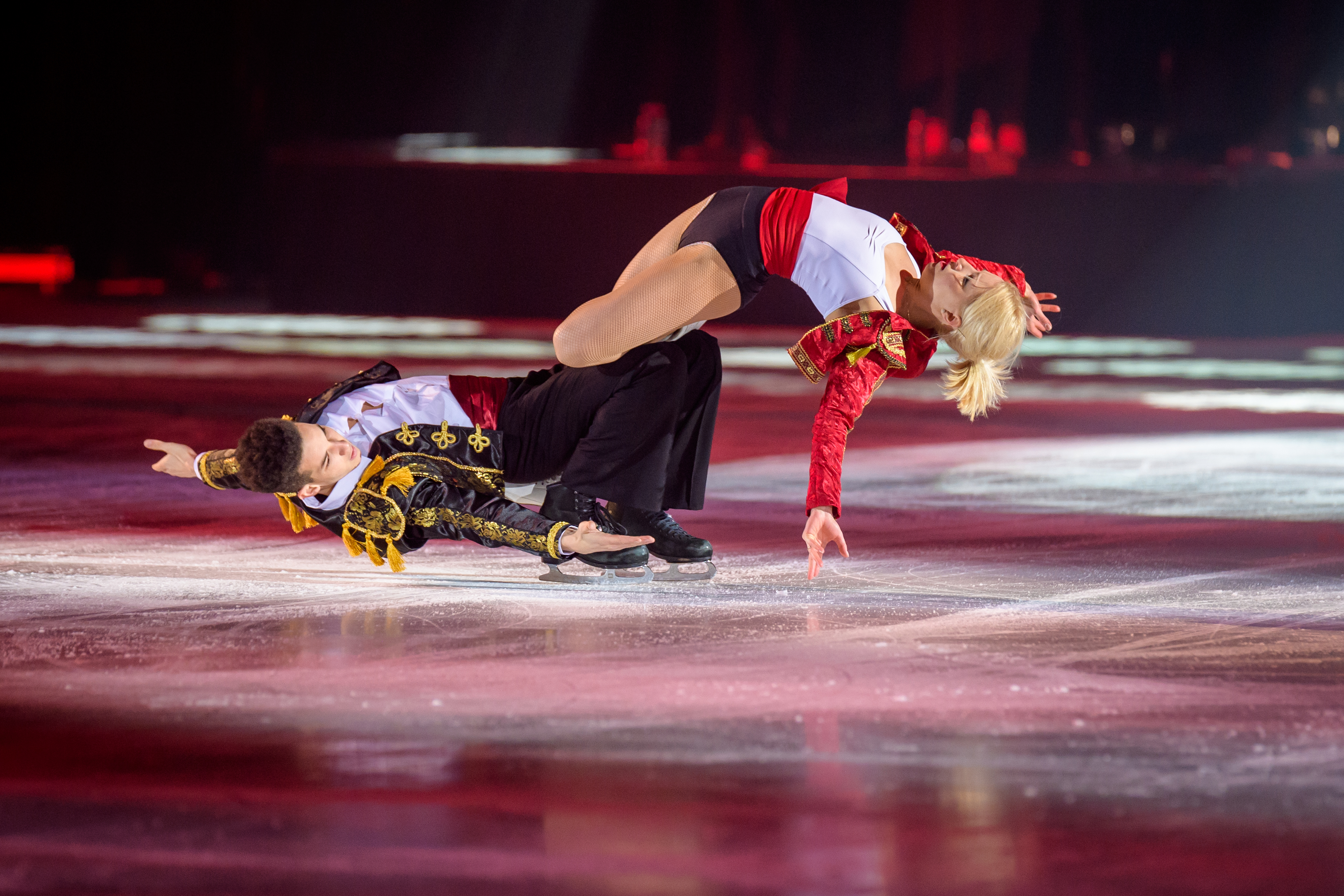
Art on Ice (Lausanne 2018)

International
| Event | 2016–17 | 2017–18 | 2018–19 | 2019–20 |
|---|---|---|---|---|
| European Champ. | | 21st | 22nd | 22nd |
| CS Alpen Trophy | | | 5th | |
| CS Asian Open | | | | 8th |
| CS Ice Star | | 9th | | |
| CS Lombardia Trophy | 6th | | | |
| CS Ondrej Nepela Memorial | 10th | | | |
| CS U.S. Classic | | | | 6th |
| CS Warsaw Cup | 4th | 9th | | 5th |
| Bavarian Open | | | 4th | |
| International Cup of Nice | 10th | 12th | | |
| NRW Trophy | 4th | | | |
| Open d'Andorra | | 6th | | |
| Pavel Roman Memorial | | | | 2nd |
| Warsaw Cup | | | 4th | |
National
| Polish Championships | WD | 2nd | 2nd | 2nd |
WD = Withdrew

=== With Hofstetter for Switzerland ===
National
| Event | 2014-15 |
|---|---|
| Swiss Championships | 1st |

=== With Voronkova for France ===
National
| Event | 2013-14 |
|---|---|
| French Championships | 3rd |

=== With Zahklupana for France ===
International: Junior
| Event | 2012-13 |
|---|---|
| JGP Slovenia | 14th |
| Pavel Roman Memorial | 9th |
National
| French Championships | 19th J |
| Master's de Patinage | 6th J |
J = Junior

=== With Voronkova for France ===
International: Junior
| Event | 2009-10 | 2010-11 | 2011-12 |
|---|---|---|---|
| JGP Romania | | | 10th |
| Lyon Trophy | | 7th | 12th |
| NRW Trophy | 15th | | |
National
| French Championships | 13th J | 11th J | 9th J |
J = Junior
