= Nikita Katsalapov =

Russian ice dancer (born 1991)

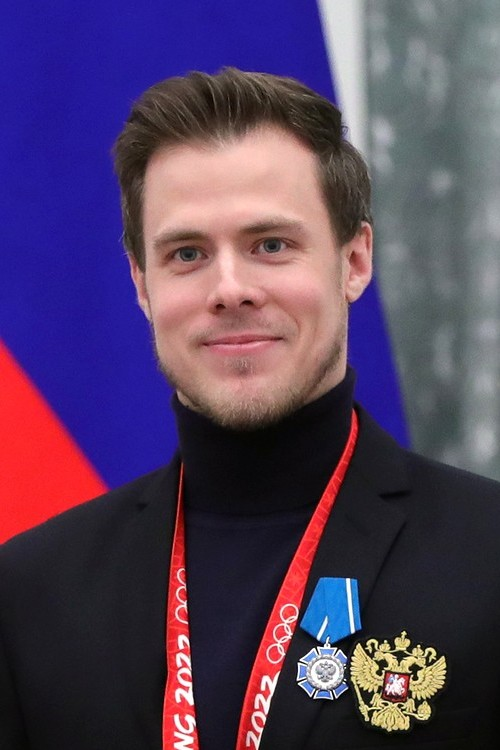
- Katsalapov at the Kremlin in 2022

Personal information
- Native name: Никита Геннадьевич Кацалапов
- Full name: Nikita Gennadyevich Katsalapov
- Born: 10 July 1991 (age 35) Moscow, Russian SFSR, Soviet Union
- Height: 1.80 m (5 ft 11 in)

Figure skating career
- Country: Russia
- Partner: Victoria Sinitsina
- Coach: Alexander Zhulin; Petr Durnev
- Skating club: Olympic School Moskvich, Moscow
- Began skating: 1995
Medal record

Figure skating: Ice dance
Representing ROC (with Sinitsina)
Olympic Games
| Silver medal – second place | 2022 Beijing | Ice dancing |
| Bronze medal – third place | 2022 Beijing | Team (Note: On 29 January 2024 CAS disqualified Valieva for four years retroactive to 25 December 2021 for an anti-doping rule violation. On 30 January 2024 the ISU reallocated medals to upgrade the United States to gold and Japan to silver while downgrading ROC to bronze.) |
Representing FSR (with Sinitsina)
World Championships
| Gold medal – first place | 2021 Stockholm | Ice dancing |
Representing Russia (with Sinitsina)
World Championships
| Silver medal – second place | 2019 Saitama | Ice dancing |
Grand Prix Final
| Silver medal – second place | 2018–19 Vancouver | Ice dancing |
World Team Trophy
| Gold medal – first place | 2021 Osaka | Team |
| Bronze medal – third place | 2019 Fukuoka | Team |
Representing Russia (with Ilinykh)
Olympic Games
| Gold medal – first place | 2014 Sochi | Team |
| Bronze medal – third place | 2014 Sochi | Ice dancing |
World Junior Championships
| Gold medal – first place | 2010 The Hague | Ice dancing |
Junior Grand Prix Final
| Silver medal – second place | 2009–10 Tokyo | Ice dancing |

Nikita Gennadyevich Katsalapov (Russian: Никита Геннадьевич Кацалапов; born 10 July 1991) is a Russian ice dancer. With Victoria Sinitsina, he is 2022 Olympic silver medalist, the 2022 Olympic bronze medalist in the team event, 2021 World champion, two-time European Champion (2020,2022), the 2019 World silver medalist, the 2018–19 Grand Prix Final silver medalist, and a two-time Russian national champion (2019–2020). They have also won several medals on the Grand Prix and the Challenger Series, including winning the 2018 CS Ondrej Nepela Trophy.

With former partner Elena Ilinykh, he is a 2014 Olympic champion in the team event, a 2014 Olympic bronze medalist in ice dancing, a three-time European medalist (silver in 2013 and 2014; bronze in 2012), and the 2010 World Junior champion.

== Personal life ==
Katsalapov was born on 10 July 1991 in Moscow.

On 22 May 2022 Nikita proposed to his ice dancing partner Victoria Sinitsina. On 2 October 2022 Sinitsina and Katsalapov officially became husband and wife.

== Early career ==
Katsapalov began in single skating but struggled with some jumps and decided to try ice dancing. He was paired with Elena Ilinykh by Irina Lobacheva and Ilia Averbukh, who were the team's first coaches. In 2005, they attended a training camp under Alexander Zhulin who was preparing Tatiana Navka and Roman Kostomarov for their Olympic gold medal-winning season. Despite feeling inspired, they split shortly afterward—Ilinykh said they were too young at the time to understand partnership, "We didn't understand at all that you need to talk to each other, to find a compromise. There were these foolish, stupid quarrels. It just didn't work." Katsalapov then skated with Angelina Kabysheva until 2008.

== Partnership with Ilinykh ==
=== Junior career ===
Ilinykh/Katsalapov decided to team up again in spring 2008 after she returned to Russia. They began training again with Alexander Zhulin in Moscow and began competing together in the 2008–09 season, placing fourth at the Russian Junior Championships.

During the 2009–10 season, Ilinykh/Katsalapov competed for the first time on the Junior Grand Prix circuit. At their first event, the event in Budapest, Hungary, they won the gold medal. At their second event, in Toruń, Poland, they won a second gold medal and qualified for the JGP Final. After winning the silver medal behind Monko/Khaliavin at the Final and at the Russian Junior Championships, they moved past them to win gold at the 2010 World Junior Championships. They were named Discovery of the Year at the 2010 Crystal Ice Awards held in October 2010 in Moscow.

=== 2010–11 season ===
For the 2010–11 season, Ilinykh/Katsalapov chose a ballet-themed free dance to Don Quixote: "[Zhulin] wanted us to do something classical Russian, and only very few people have done a real ballet program in dance." Ilinykh's tutu was made at the Bolshoi. They made their senior debut at the 2010 NHK Trophy where they finished fourth. At their next event, 2010 Cup of Russia, they won the bronze medal, their first medal on the senior Grand Prix series. At the 2011 Russian Nationals, they were second after the short dance behind Bobrova/Soloviev but placed fourth in the free dance to finish third overall behind Riazanova/Tkachenko. However, their bronze medal was enough to earn them their first berth to the European Championships.

At the 2011 Europeans, Ilinykh/Katsalapov set new personal bests in the short dance (60.93), free dance (92.55) and combined total (153.48) to finish fourth in their debut at the event. They were in a battle with Riazanova/Tkachenko for Russia's second of only two berths to the 2011 World Championships. By finishing ahead of them, Ilinykh/Katsalapov won the right to make their senior Worlds debut. They finished seventh at the event. Following the end of the season, they ended their collaboration with Alexander Zhulin and Oleg Volkov to begin working with new coach Nikolai Morozov in May 2011. During the off-season, they spent some time in the U.S. preparing for the 2011–12 season.

=== 2011–12 season ===
For the 2011–12 Grand Prix season, Ilinykh/Katsalapov were assigned to 2011 NHK Trophy and 2011 Trophée Eric Bompard. At NHK Trophy, they placed first in the short dance but in the warm-up before the free dance Ilinykh crashed into the boards and injured her knee. The couple finished the competition, winning the bronze medal, but withdrew from the exhibitions. Ilinykh/Katsalapov then finished fourth at the 2011 Trophee Eric Bompard. They won the silver medal at the 2012 Russian Championships. At the 2012 European Championships, Ilinykh/Katsalapov were seventh in the short dance but set a personal best in their free dance, resulting in an overall total of 153.12 points. They won the bronze medal at the event and then performed with Art on Ice. Ilinykh/Katsalapov finished 5th—the highest of the three Russian teams—at the 2012 World Championships. Their final event of the season was the 2012 World Team Trophy.

=== 2012–13 season ===
Ilinykh/Katsalapov started their season with gold at the 2012 Crystal Skate of Romania. They won silver at their first 2012–13 Grand Prix event, the 2012 Rostelecom Cup. At the 2012 NHK Trophy, Ilinykh/Katsalapov were third after the short dance. Ilinykh fell ill before the free dance due to food poisoning but went on to compete. They placed second in the segment and won the silver medal. They qualified for the 2012 Grand Prix Final in Sochi, Russia, and finished sixth at the event. At the 2013 Russian Championships, Ilinykh/Katsalapov won the silver medal behind defending national champions Bobrova/Soloviev. At the 2013 European Championships, they placed second in the short dance and first in the free dance. They won the silver medal, just 0.11 of a point behind gold medalists Bobrova/Soloviev. Ilinykh/Katsalapov finished ninth at the 2013 World Championships.

=== 2013–14 season ===
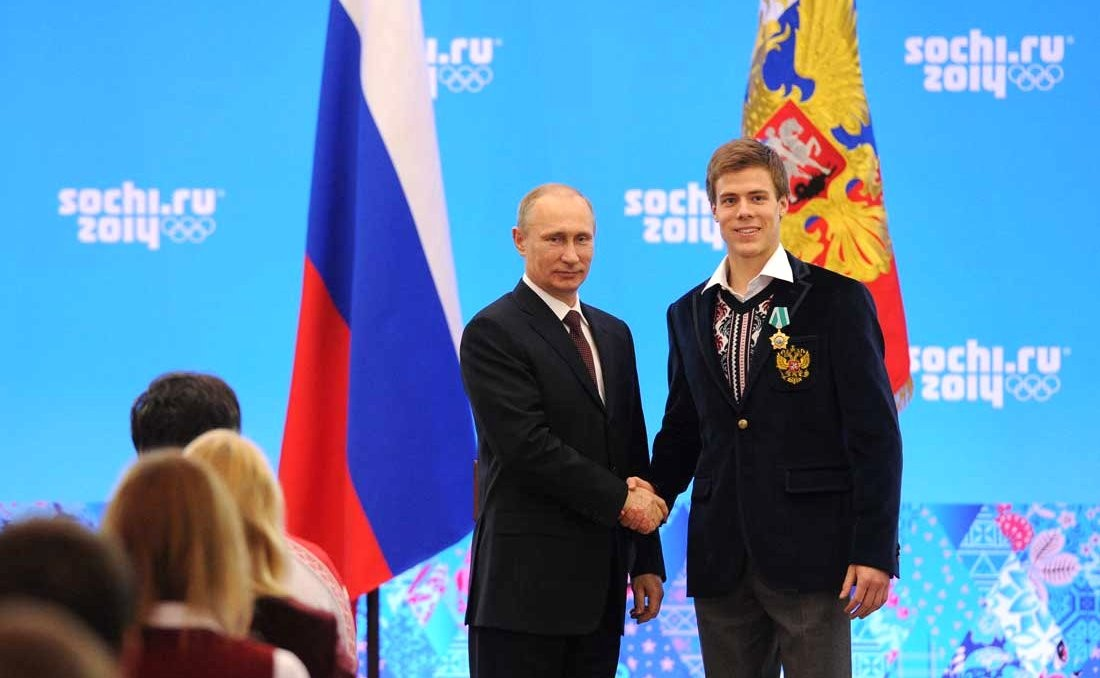
Katsalapov at the awarding ceremony for Russian athletes with President Vladimir Putin

Ilinykh/Katsalapov's first assignment of the 2013–14 Grand Prix season was the 2013 NHK Trophy where they placed fourth. At their next event, the 2013 Trophee Eric Bompard, they scored personal bests in both segments, finishing with an overall score of 171.89 points and winning the silver medal ahead of French ice dancers Pechalat/Bourzat.

Ilinykh/Katsalapov won their third national silver medal at the 2014 Russian Championships behind Bobrova/Soloviev and then won silver at the 2014 European Championships with an overall score 1.1 points less than gold medalists Cappellini/Lanotte. At the 2014 Winter Olympics in Sochi, Ilinykh/Katsalapov were assigned to the free dance in the inaugural team event. They placed third in their segment and Team Russia won the gold medal. Ilinykh/Katsalapov then won the bronze medal in the individual ice dancing event behind champions Davis/White and silver medalists Virtue/Moir. They scored personal bests in both segments and an overall total of 183.48 points.

The next month, Ilinykh/Katsalapov traveled to Saitama, Japan for the 2014 World Championships. On 26 March 2014, just before the short dance, ITAR-TASS reported that they would split after the competition. Katsalapov had a serious error on the twizzles and they placed fifth in the short dance. Despite winning the next segment, they finished off the podium in the closely contested event. Their total score was just 1.05 less than the gold medalists. On 4 April 2014, Katsalapov confirmed to Ilinykh that he wanted to end their partnership.

== Partnership with Sinitsina ==
On 11 April 2014, Katsalapov and Victoria Sinitsina applied for approval of their partnership from the Figure Skating Federation of Russia (FSFR). They then traveled to Michigan to train for three weeks under Marina Zueva.

=== 2014–15 season ===
Sinitsina/Katsalapov made their competitive debut at the 2014 Rostelecom Cup, a Grand Prix event in Moscow; they placed fourth in both segments and finished well behind their former partners. At the 2014 NHK Trophy, they finished fifth in the short dance, eighth in the free dance after falling on one lift and aborting another, and eighth overall. They were fourth at the 2015 Russian Championships.

=== 2015–16 season ===
A stress fracture in his foot that kept Katsalapov off the ice in early 2015 recurred in the summer of 2015, keeping the duo out of test skates organized by the FSFR. Competing in the 2015–16 Grand Prix series, Sinitsina/Katsalapov won the silver medal at the 2015 Skate America, obtaining the highest total technical elements score in the free dance, and then bronze at the 2015 Rostelecom Cup, behind Italians Cappellini/Lanotte. They were the second highest-ranked Russian couple in the Grand Prix rankings, behind Ekaterina Bobrova and Dmitri Soloviev who also won one silver and one bronze but had a higher total short dance score, and were the first alternates for the 2015–16 Grand Prix Final. In December, Sinitsina/Katsalapov won the silver medal behind Bobrova/Soloviev at the 2016 Russian Championships in Yekaterinburg.

In January, Sinitsina/Katsalapov finished fourth behind Bobrova/Soloviev at the 2016 European Championships in Bratislava, Slovakia. They placed ninth at the 2016 World Championships in Boston.

Two days after the World Championships, Katsalapov received a surgery on his right shoulder.

=== 2016–17 season ===
In mid-2016, Sinitsina/Katsalapov returned to Russia to train and continue rehabilitation of his shoulder in Moscow. Oleg Volkov was named as their coach and Elena Tchaikovskaya was added later to their coaching team.

At their Grand Prix events they first placed fourth at the 2016 Cup of China and then fifth at the 2016 NHK Trophy. At the 2017 Russian Championships they won the bronze medal but finished only tenth at the 2017 European Championships.

=== 2017–18 season ===
Sinitsina/Katsalapov were scheduled for the later Grand Prix events NHK Trophy and Skate America in November. Before their Grand Prix events they skated one Challenger event, the 2017 CS Minsk-Arena Ice Star, where they won the bronze medal. At their Grand Prix events they first placed fourth at the 2017 NHK Trophy and then they won the bronze medal at the 2017 Skate America. At the 2018 Russian Championships they had to withdraw after the short dance.

=== 2018–19 season ===
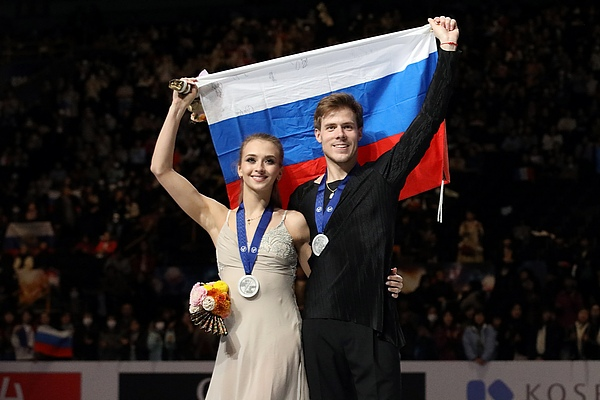
Sinitsina/Katsalapov at the 2019 World Championships

Sinitsina/Katsalapov started their season at the 2018 CS Ondrej Nepela Trophy where they won the gold medal with a personal best score of 196.42 points. In late October they won the silver medal at the 2018 Skate Canada. In late November they won their second Grand Prix silver medal of the season at the 2018 Internationaux de France. At this event they also scored their personal best score of 200.38 points. With two Grand Prix silver medals they qualified for the 2018–19 Grand Prix Final. At the Grand Prix Final, Sinitsina/Katsalapov won the silver medal after placing third in the rhythm dance and second in the free dance. At this event they also scored their personal best score of 201.37 points.

At the 2019 Russian Championships, Sinitsina/Katsalapov placed first in both the rhythm and free dances, taking the Russian national title for the first time in their careers.

Sinitsina/Katsalapov were medal favourites going into the 2019 European Championships, but encountered issues in the rhythm dance when first Katsalapov and then Sinitsina fell during their twizzle sequence. They placed fifth in the rhythm dance, almost nine points behind the third-place team, and effectively out of medal contention. Katsalapov was uncertain as to the cause, saying "I don't know exactly what happened. I can't excuse it or justify it." They placed third in the free dance, winning a bronze small medal, with Katsalapov saying that they "fought hard to show the beautiful choreography of our program and avoid any stupid mistakes."

At the 2019 World Championships, Sinitsina/Katsalapov placed second in both segments, winning the silver medal, their first World medal. Katsalapov said he was "pleased to get a medal. We will try our best for consistency and clean performances." Subsequently, they were assigned to the 2019 World Team Trophy, finishing second in both dance segments, and winning the bronze medal as part of Team Russia.

=== 2019–20 season ===
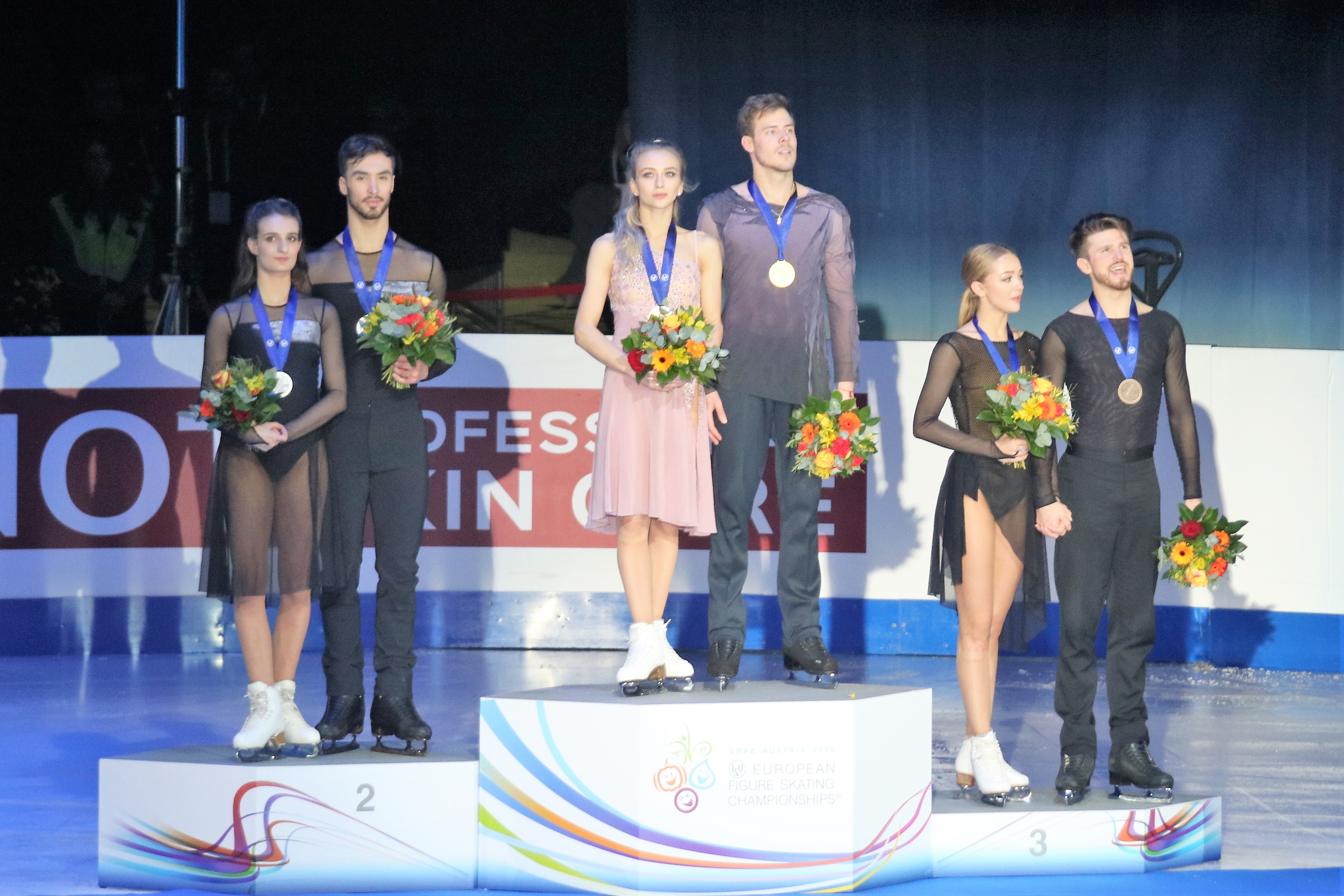
Sinitsina/Katsalapov claim gold at the 2020 European Championships

Sinitsina/Katsalapov started their season at the 2019 CS Ondrej Nepela Memorial, where they won the gold medal. On the Grand Prix, they began at the 2019 Cup of China, where they placed first in the rhythm dance with a new personal best score. The finished second in the free dance, behind Madison Chock/Evan Bates, but their rhythm dance lead was sufficient to give them the gold medal. Katsalapov said they were "not pleased with our performance today", and hoped that they would show improvement the following week. At the 2019 Rostelecom Cup, they won the gold medal. Katsalapov said they looked forward to showing their "very best" at the Grand Prix Final. Competing at the Final, they unexpectedly placed fourth in the rhythm dance after a number of technical issues, leading him to comment "I made a mistake on the twizzles and realized that level would be definitely reduced. But looking at the points and levels, it seems that everything was bad." In the free dance, they came sixth out of the six teams after losing levels on a number of elements and Sinitsina having a technical fall in their choreographic sliding movement, and dropped to sixth overall.

Competing at the 2020 Russian Championships, Sinitsina/Katsalapov placed first in the rhythm dance despite a slight loss of balance by Katsalapov in his twizzle sequence. Second in the free dance, they nevertheless won their second national title.

In what would prove to be their final competition of the season, Sinitsina/Katsalapov competed at the 2020 European Championships in Graz. After the rhythm dance, they were in second place, separated from five-time defending champions Papadakis/Cizeron by only 0.05 points. In a close result, they won the free dance and took the title overall by a margin of 0.14 points. This marked the first time anyone had beaten Papadakis/Cizeron since Virtue/Moir at the 2018 Winter Olympics, and the first time they had been defeated in the free dance since the 2016–17 Grand Prix Final. The result was considered a major upset, with Katsalapov remarking "to get anywhere near Gabriella and Guillaume seemed impossible for all the skaters."

The European result generated immediate speculation that Sinitsina/Katsalapov could challenge Papadakis/Cizeron for the World gold at the 2020 World Championships in Montreal, but these were cancelled as a result of the coronavirus pandemic.

=== 2020–21 season ===
Due to Katsalapov recovering from an injury, the team missed the 2020 Russian senior test skates. Sinitsina/Katsalapov thus began the season at the second stage of the domestic Russia Cup, but had to withdraw midway through the free dance after Sinitsina suffered severe tendon inflammation.

Following recovery, the duo had their first full competition at the 2020 Rostelecom Cup, placing first in the rhythm dance by a wide margin. They struggled toward the end of their free dance, which Sinitsina said was their "first full run-through", but remained comfortably first in both the segment and overall. They subsequently withdrew from the fifth stage of the Russian Cup and the 2021 Russian Championships due to medical issues. Katsalapov subsequently indicated that both had contracted COVID-19, with his being a mild case while hers was "severe" and damaged her lungs. The two were announced as performing in a New Year's skating show to help regain competitive form.

Following a victory at the Russian Cup Final, Sinitsina/Katsalapov were assigned to the 2021 World Championships, to be held without an audience in Stockholm. Four-time and defending champions Papadakis/Cizeron declined to attend due to their own illness with COVID and lack of training time, leading to much speculation that Sinitsina/Katsalapov were the frontrunners to claim the World title. They won both the rhythm and free dances to take the gold medal, setting personal bests for the free dance and total score. Their placement combined with the fifth-place finish of Stepanova/Bukin qualified three berths for Russian ice dance at the 2022 Winter Olympic Games in Beijing.

Sinitsina/Katsalapov finished the season at the 2021 World Team Trophy, where they finished first in both of their segments and Team Russia won the gold medal.

=== 2021–22 season ===
After debuting their programs at the Russian senior test skates, Sinitsina/Katsalapov withdrew from a planned appearance on the domestic Russian Cup series due to Katsalapov suffering a back injury.

Making their season debut on the Grand Prix at the 2021 NHK Trophy, Sinitsina/Katsalapov won the gold medal. Speaking after the free dance, Katsalapov credited the crowd for it support, and said that "we want to improve further, but for now we are happy. Our program is about us, our career and hopefully with a bright finish." They won a second gold at the 2021 Rostelecom Cup. The results qualified them for the Grand Prix Final, to be held in Osaka, but it was subsequently cancelled due to restrictions prompted by the Omicron variant.

Seeking to win their third national title at the 2022 Russian Championships, Sinitsina/Katsalapov won the rhythm dance. However, they then had to withdraw from the event due to an exacerbation of Katsalapov's back injury. Despite this, they were named to the Russian team for the 2022 European Championships. Sinitsina/Katsalapov won both segments of the competition to successfully defend their European title. On 20 January, they were officially named to the Russian Olympic team.

Sinitsina/Katsalapov began the 2022 Winter Olympics as the Russian entries in the rhythm dance segment of the Olympic team event. They unexpectedly placed second in the segment, behind Americans Hubbell/Donohue, after Katsalapov lost a twizzle level and visibly stumbled at one point. Skating the free dance segment as well, they finished second behind Americans Chock/Bates due to an extended lift deduction, but nevertheless won the gold medal as part of Team Russia. Katsalapov became the first skater to win two gold medals in the team event. In the dance event, Sinitsina/Katsalapov came second in the rhythm dance with 88.85, 1.98 points behind Papadakis/Cizeron's world record score. Second in the free dance as well, they won the silver medal, Sinitsina's second Olympic medal and Katsalapov's fourth. Exuberant afterward, she said "we came here to fight for the highest placement, but it was a fair competition and we are pleased with our result. This time it is silver, next time maybe gold." Sinitsina added "this is every athlete's dream, it's something they work all their lives for."

Days after the Olympics, Vladimir Putin ordered a full-scale invasion of Ukraine. In response to this, the International Skating Union banned all Russian and Belarusian athletes from competing at the 2022 World Championships, bringing an end to Sinitsina and Katsalapov's international season.

== Support of Russia's invasion of Ukraine ==
On 18 March 2022, Katsalapov and Sinitsina appeared at Putin's Moscow rally celebrating the annexation of Crimea from Ukraine in 2014 and justifying the invasion of the country. They both wore the Z military symbol used by the Russian invading army in Ukraine. Sinitsina and Katsalapov's presence at the rally was criticized by their former training partners, Ukrainian ice dancers Oleksandra Nazarova and Maksym Nikitin, who spent weeks caught in the siege of Kharkiv. Nikitin said "we were such big friends with Vika and Nikita. It was so difficult to see how they are supporting their President who is killing our Ukrainian people."

In December 2022, the Ukrainian Parliament sanctioned Katsalapov and Sinitsina for their support of the war.

== Programs ==
=== With Sinitsina ===
| Season | Rhythm dance | Free dance | Exhibition |
|---|---|---|---|
| 2021–22 | You Can Leave Your Hat On (from 9½ Weeks) performed by Joe Cocker; Brick House by Commodores choreo. by Sergey Petukhov | Piano Concerto No. 2; Rhapsody on a Theme of Paganini by Sergei Rachmaninoff choreo. by Sergey Petukhov | |
| 2020–21 | Singin' in the Rain by Arthur Freed & Nacio Herb Brown choreo. by Sergey Petukhov | I Giorni by Ludovico Einaudi; Songs My Mother Taught Me by Antonín Dvořák choreo. by Sergey Petukhov; Smile; Come Together performed by Michael Jackson choreo. by Sergey Petukhov | My Way by Aloe Blacc |
| 2019–20 | Singin' in the Rain by Arthur Freed & Nacio Herb Brown choreo. by Sergey Petukhov | I Giorni by Ludovico Einaudi; Songs My Mother Taught Me by Antonín Dvořák choreo. by Sergey Petukhov | Who Wants To Live Forever by Sarah Brightman |
| 2018–19 | Tango: Verano Porteno by Astor Piazzolla, performed by Raul Garello | Suite in D "Air" Johann Sebastian Bach; Praeludium and Allegro (In the Style of Pugnani) by Fritz Kreisler | |
| | Short dance | | |
| 2017–18 | Rhumba: Balumukeno by Bonga; Rhumba: Água de Beber by Al Jarreau; Samba: Batucada Brasileira | Piano Concerto No. 2 Op. 18 by Sergei Rachmaninoff | Going to the Run by Golden Earrings |
| 2016–17 | Blues: Love Creole by Duke Ellington; Swing: It Don't Mean a Thing performed by Tony Bennett and Lady Gaga | Tango Ballet by Astor Piazzolla | Going to the Run by Golden Earrings |
| 2015–16 | Swan Lake by Pyotr Ilyich Tchaikovsky; Waltz; March; Polka | Io Ci Saro by Andrea Bocelli and Lang Lang | Grande Polonaise for Piano and Orchestra (from The Pianist) by Frédéric Chopin performed by Janusz Olejniczak |
| 2014–15 | Flamenco: Toitas las Mares by Manolo Caracol; Paso doble: The Dance by Michel Legrand | Did You Ever Feel Lonely; The Messiah Will Come Again by Gary Moore | Grande Polonaise for Piano and Orchestra (from The Pianist) by Frédéric Chopin performed by Janusz Olejniczak |

=== With Ilinykh ===
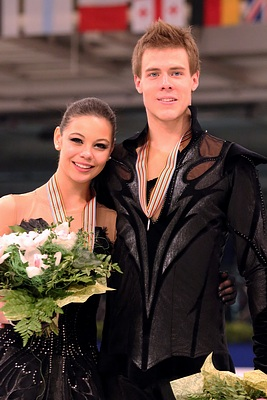
Ilinykh and Katsalapov at the 2014 European Championships

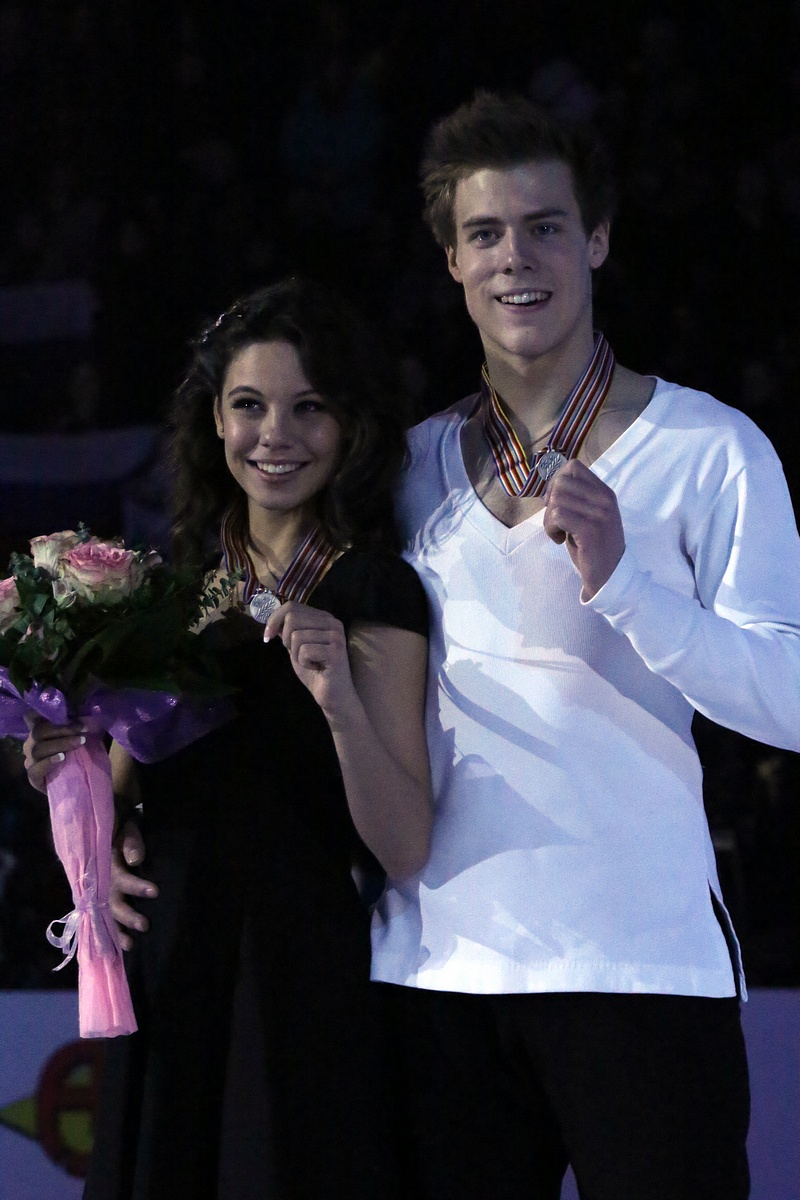
Ilinykh and Katsalapov at the 2013 European Championships

| Season | Short dance | Free dance | Exhibition |
|---|---|---|---|
| 2013–2014 | Quickstep: Bei Mir Bistu Shein by Sholom Secunda; Slow foxtrot: Sixteen Tons performed by LeAnn Rimes; Quickstep: Sing, Sing, Sing | Swan Lake by Pyotr I. Tchaikovsky choreo. by Nikolai Morozov | I Believe by Ayaka; Snow by Philipp Kirkorov, Anastasiya Petryk; Adagio in G minor by Tomaso Albinoni |
| 2012–2013 | Uzbek dance: Andijan Polka (specially composed arrangement) | Ghost the Musical by Dave Stewart and Glen Ballard | Capricious Horses by Garik Sukachev; Someone like You by Adele |
| 2011–2012 | Hip Hip Chin Chin by Club des Belugas; Mas que nada by Sérgio Mendes; Mujer Latina by Thalía | Ave Maria performed by Thomas Spencer-Wortley | Black Velvet by Alannah Myles |
| 2010–2011 | Waltz: Agony by Alfred Schnittke; Tango: Red Tango by Bayan Mix | Don Quixote by Ludwig Minkus | I Put a Spell on You by Nina Simone; Snow by Philipp Kirkorov, Anastasiya Petryk; Petite Fleur; Rock Around the Clock |
| | Original dance | | |
| 2009–2010 | Sikuriadas (Panpipes Of The Andes) by Incantation | Schindler's List by John Williams; Fiddler on the Roof | Petite Fleur; Rock Around The Clock |
| 2008–2009 | Selections; Sing, Sing, Sing by Louis Prima | Sarabande by Jon Lord | |
| 2004–2005 | Swing combo | Cats by Andrew Lloyd Webber | |

== Records and achievements ==
(with Sinitsina)

- Set the ice dancing record of the new +5 / -5 GOE (Grade of Execution) system for the free dance (120.46 points) at the 2018 CS Ondrej Nepela Trophy.
- They became the first team to score above 120 points in the free dance at the 2018 CS Ondrej Nepela Trophy.
- Became the first ice dance team to win the World Championship and the World Team Trophy in the same year.

== Competitive highlights ==
GP: Grand Prix; CS: Challenger Series; JGP: Junior Grand Prix

=== With Sinitsina ===
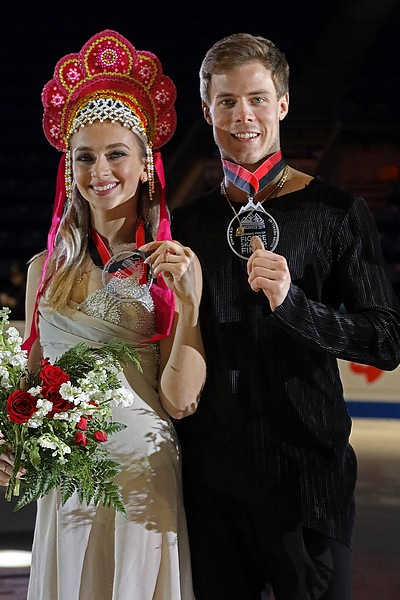
Sinitsina and Katsalapov at the 2018–19 Grand Prix Final

International
| Event | 14–15 | 15–16 | 16–17 | 17–18 | 18–19 | 19–20 | 20–21 | 21–22 |
|---|---|---|---|---|---|---|---|---|
| Olympics | | | | | | | | 2nd |
| Worlds | | 9th | | | 2nd | C | 1st | |
| Europeans | | 4th | 10th | | 4th | 1st | | 1st |
| GP Final | | | | | 2nd | 6th | | C |
| GP Cup of China | | | 4th | | | 1st | | |
| GP France | | | | | 2nd | | | |
| GP NHK Trophy | 7th | | 5th | 4th | | | | 1st |
| GP Rostelecom | 4th | 3rd | | | | 1st | 1st | 1st |
| GP Skate America | | 2nd | | 3rd | | | | |
| GP Skate Canada | | | | | 2nd | | | |
| CS Denis Ten MC | | | | | | | | WD |
| CS Ice Star | | | | 3rd | | | | |
| CS Nepela Trophy | | | | | 1st | 1st | | |
| Shanghai Trophy | | | | | | 1st | | |
National
| Russian Champ. | 4th | 2nd | 3rd | WD | 1st | 1st | WD | WD |
Team events
| Olympics | | | | | | | | 3rd T 2nd P |
| World Team Trophy | | | | | 3rd T 2nd P | | 1st T 1st P | |
TBD = Assigned; WD = Withdrew; C = Event eancelled T = Team result; P = Personal result. Medals awarded for team result only.

=== With Ilinykh ===
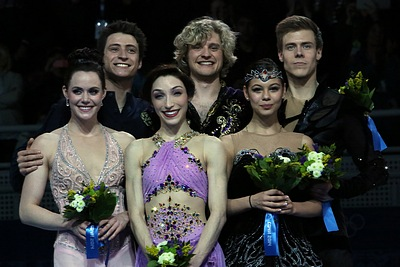
Ilinykh and Katsalapov at the 2014 Winter Olympics podium.

International
| Event | 08–09 | 09–10 | 10–11 | 11–12 | 12–13 | 13–14 |
|---|---|---|---|---|---|---|
| Olympics | | | | | | 3rd |
| Worlds | | | 7th | 5th | 9th | 4th |
| Europeans | | | 4th | 3rd | 2nd | 2nd |
| GP Final | | | | | 6th | |
| GP Bompard | | | | 4th | | 2nd |
| GP NHK Trophy | | | 4th | 3rd | 2nd | 4th |
| GP Rostelecom | | | 3rd | | 2nd | |
| Crystal Skate | | | | | 1st | |
International: Junior
| Junior Worlds | | 1st | | | | |
| JGP Final | | 2nd | | | | |
| JGP Hungary | | 1st | | | | |
| JGP Poland | | 1st | | | | |
National
| Russian Champ. | | | 3rd | 2nd | 2nd | 2nd |
| Russian Junior | 4th | 2nd | | | | |
Team events
| Olympics | | | | | | 1st 3rd P |
| World Team; Trophy | | | | 5th T 5th P | | |
T = Team result; P = Personal result; Medals awarded for team result only.

== Detailed results ==
Small medals for short and free programs awarded only at ISU Championships. At team events, medals awarded for team results only. ISU personal bests highlighted in bold.

=== With Sinitsina ===
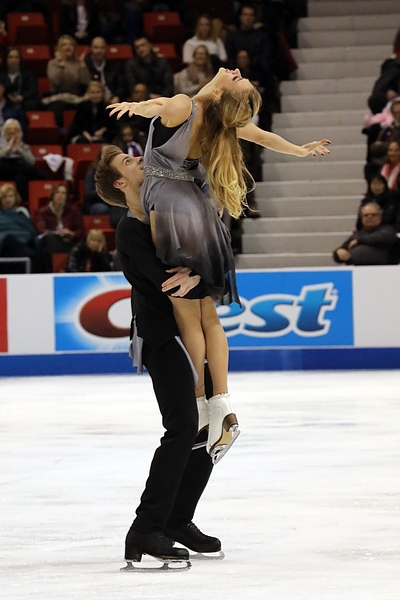
Sinitsina and Katsalapov at the 2017 Skate America

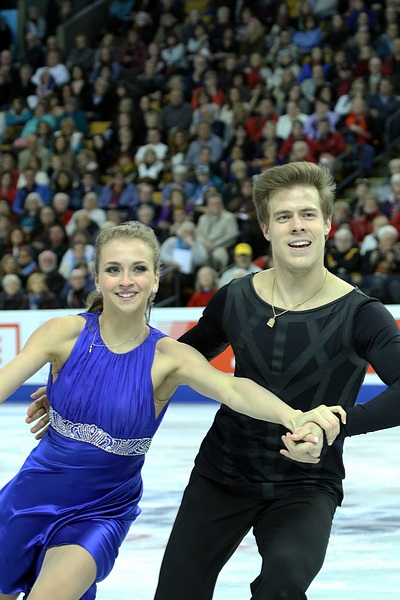
Sinitsina and Katsalapov at the 2016 World Championships

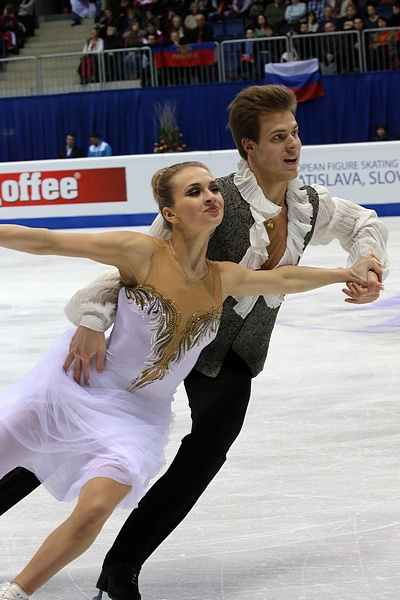
Sinitsina and Katsalapov at the 2016 European Championships

2021–22 season
| Date | Event | RD | FD | Total |
|---|---|---|---|---|
| 12–14 February 2022 | 2022 Winter Olympics | 2; **88.85** | 2; 131.66 | 2; 220.51 |
| 4–7 February 2022 | 2022 Winter Olympics – Team event | 2; 85.05 | 2; 128.17 | 3^{T} |
| 10–16 January 2022 | 2022 European Championships | 1; 87.89 | 1; 130.07 | 1; 217.96 |
| 21–26 December 2021 | 2022 Russian Championships | 1; 93.61 | WD | WD |
| 26–28 November 2021 | 2021 Rostelecom Cup | 1; 86.81 | 1; 124.91 | 1; 211.72 |
| 12–14 November 2021 | 2021 NHK Trophy | 1; 86.33 | 1; 129.11 | 1; 215.44 |
2020–21 season
| Date | Event | RD | FD | Total |
| 15–18 April 2021 | 2021 World Team Trophy | 1; 86.66 | 1; 130.15 | 1T/1P; 216.81 |
| 22–28 March 2021 | 2021 World Championships | 1; 88.15 | 1; **133.02** | 1; **221.17** |
| 26 February – 2 March 2021 | 2021 Russian Cup Final domestic competition | 1; 90.44 | 1; 132.68 | 1; 223.12 |
| 20–22 November 2020 | 2020 Rostelecom Cup | 1; 91.13 | 1; 126.38 | 1; 217.51 |
| 10–13 October 2020 | 2020 Cup of Russia Series, 2nd Stage, Moscow domestic competition | 1; 89.52 | WD | WD |
2019–20 season
| Date | Event | RD | FD | Total |
| 24–25 January 2020 | 2020 European Championships | 2; 88.73 | 1; 131.69 | 1; 220.42 |
| 24–29 December 2019 | 2020 Russian Championships | 1; 88.43 | 2; 132.31 | 1; 220.74 |
| 4–8 December 2019 | 2019–20 Grand Prix Final | 4; 81.51 | 6; 121.88 | 6; 203.39 |
| 15–17 November 2019 | 2019 Rostelecom Cup | 1; 86.09 | 1; 126.06 | 1; 212.15 |
| 8–10 November 2019 | 2019 Cup of China | 1; 85.39 | 2; 124.51 | 1; 209.90 |
| 3–5 October 2019 | 2019 Shanghai Trophy | 1; 86.77 | 1; 126.77 | 1; 213.54 |
| 19–21 September 2019 | 2019 CS Ondrej Nepela Memorial | 1; 78.44 | 1; 119.70 | 1; 198.14 |
2018–19 season
| Date | Event | RD | FD | Total |
| 11–14 April 2019 | 2019 World Team Trophy | 2; 84.57 | 2; 130.63 | 3T/2P; 215.20 |
| 18–24 March 2019 | 2019 World Championships | 2; 83.94 | 2; 127.82 | 2; 211.76 |
| 21–27 January 2019 | 2019 European Championships | 5; 70.24 | 3; 123.71 | 4; 193.95 |
| 19–23 December 2018 | 2019 Russian Championships | 1; 84.01 | 1; 128.31 | 1; 212.32 |
| 6–9 December 2018 | 2018–19 Grand Prix Final | 3; 77.33 | 2; 124.04 | 2; 201.37 |
| 23–25 November 2018 | 2018 Internationaux de France | 2; 77.91 | 2; 122.47 | 2; 200.38 |
| 26–28 October 2018 | 2018 Skate Canada | 2; 74.66 | 1; 120.51 | 2; 195.17 |
| 19–22 September 2018 | 2018 CS Ondrej Nepela Trophy | 1; 75.96 | 1; 120.46 | 1; 196.42 |
2017–18 season
| Date | Event | SD | FD | Total |
| 21–24 December 2017 | 2018 Russian Championships | 4; 68.46 | WD | WD |
| 24–26 November 2017 | 2017 Skate America | 3; 68.72 | 3; 107.81 | 3; 176.53 |
| 10–12 November 2017 | 2017 NHK Trophy | 4; 72.49 | 4; 104.66 | 4; 177.15 |
| 26–29 October 2017 | 2017 CS Minsk-Arena Ice Star | 3; 63.81 | 3; 101.49 | 3; 165.30 |
2016–17 season
| Date | Event | SD | FD | Total |
| 25–29 January 2017 | 2017 European Championships | 8; 64.67 | 12; 89.84 | 10; 154.51 |
| 22–25 December 2016 | 2017 Russian Championships | 3; 73.78 | 4; 104.67 | 3; 178.45 |
| 25–27 November 2016 | 2016 NHK Trophy | 4; 68.85 | 5; 100.77 | 5; 169.62 |
| 18–20 November 2016 | 2016 Cup of China | 4; 70.24 | 4; 101.70 | 4; 171.94 |
2015–16 season
| Date | Event | SD | FD | Total |
| 28 March – 3 April 2016 | 2016 World Championships | 9; 67.68 | 10; 101.29 | 9; 168.97 |
| 26–31 January 2016 | 2016 European Championships | 4; 68.33 | 4; 104.32 | 4; 172.65 |
| 23–27 December 2015 | 2016 Russian Championships | 1; 73.96 | 3; 101.87 | 2; 175.83 |
| 20–22 November 2015 | 2015 Rostelecom Cup | 3; 63.63 | 3; 103.77 | 3; 167.40 |
| 23–25 October 2015 | 2015 Skate America | 2; 62.76 | 2; 99.45 | 2; 162.21 |
2014–15 season
| Date | Event | SD | FD | Total |
| 25–28 December 2014 | 2015 Russian Championships | 4; 60.79 | 4; 97.78 | 4; 158.57 |
| 28–30 November 2014 | 2014 NHK Trophy | 5; 54.94 | 8; 67.37 | 7; 122.31 |
| 14–16 November 2014 | 2014 Rostelecom Cup | 4; 57.96 | 4; 89.59 | 4; 147.55 |

=== With Ilinykh ===
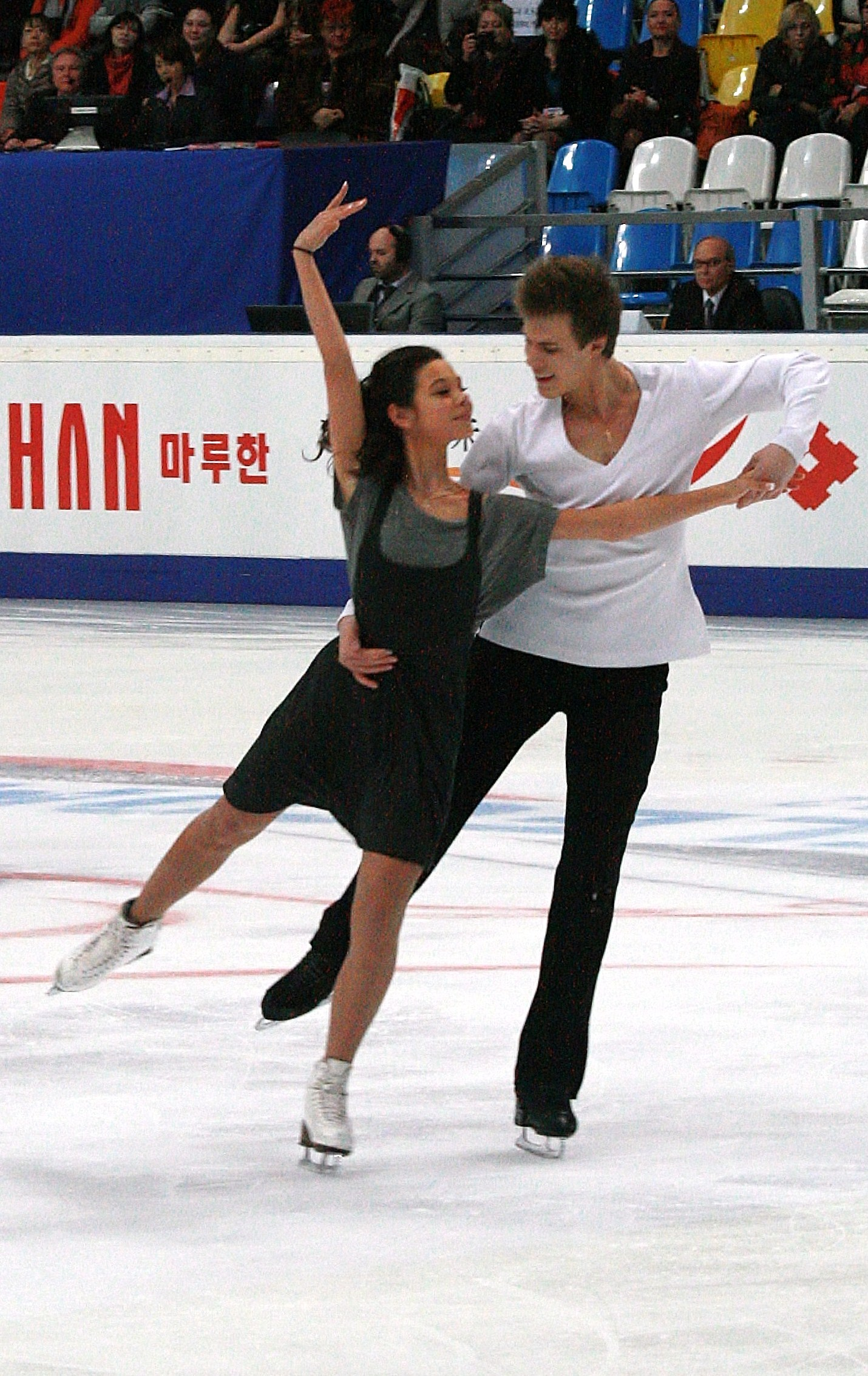
Ilinykh and Katsalapov Free dance at the 2012 Rostelecom Cup

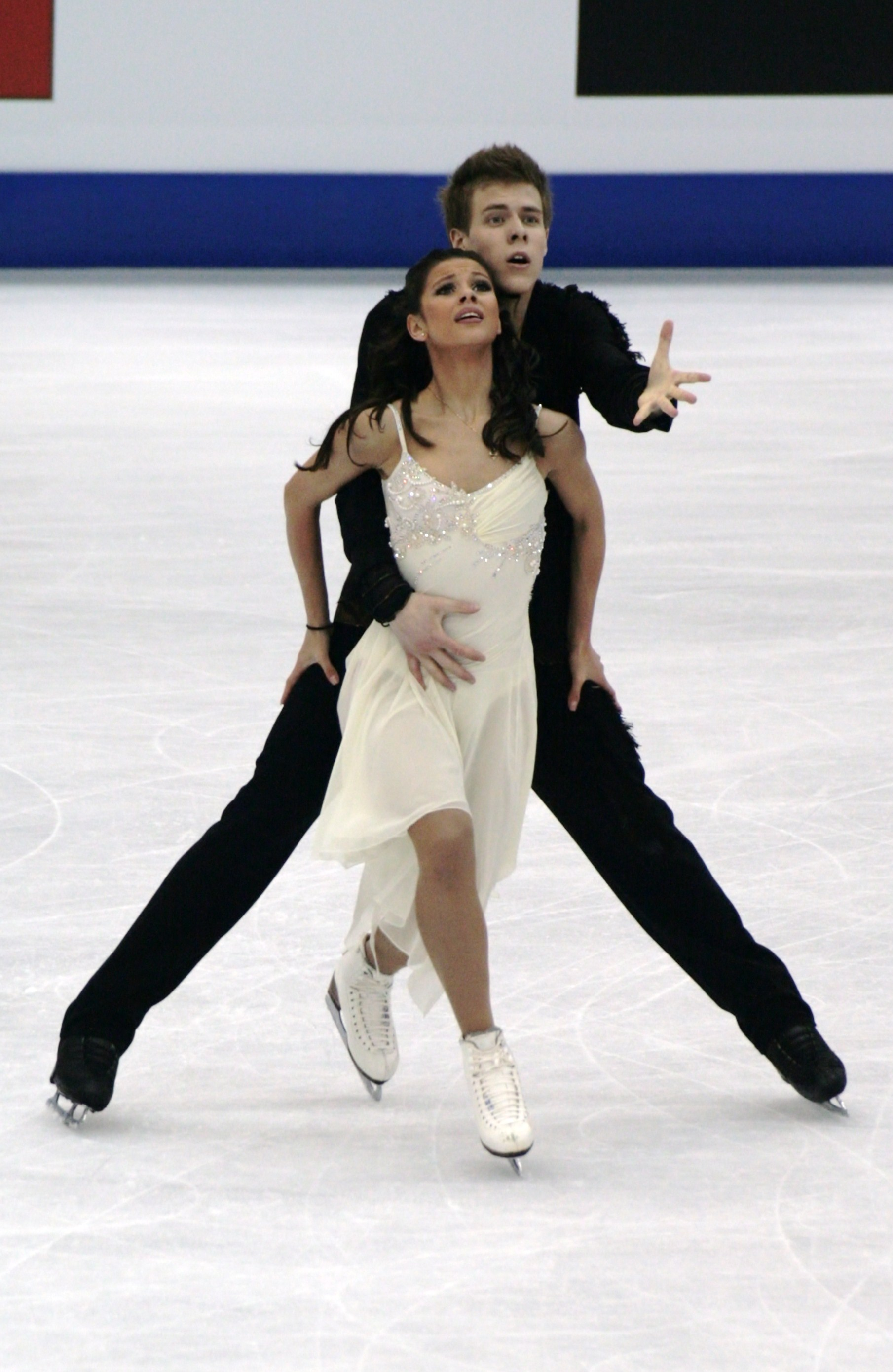
Ilinykh and Katsalapov at the 2012 World Championships

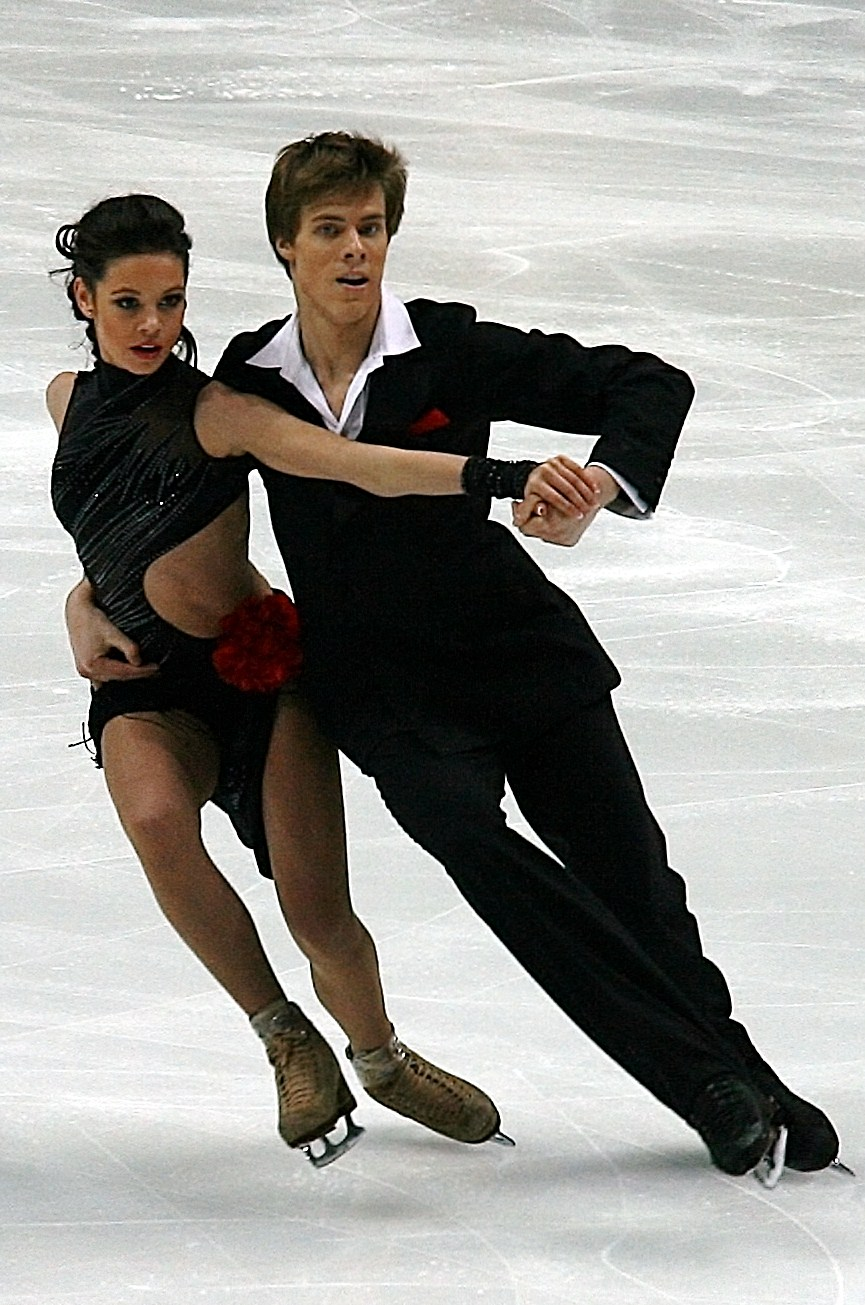
The short dance at 2011 Worlds

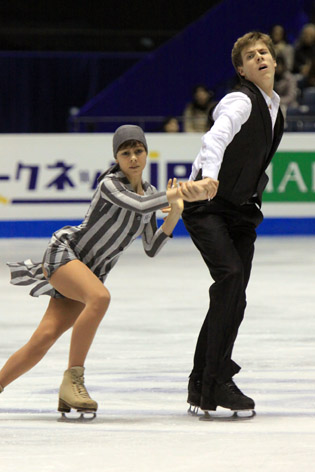
Ilinykh and Katsalapov won the 2009 Junior Grand Prix Final.

2013–14 season
| Date | Event | Level | SD | FD | Total |
|---|---|---|---|---|---|
| 28–29 March 2014 | 2014 World Championships | Senior | 5; 65.67 | 1; 108.71 | 4; 174.38 |
| 16–17 February 2014 | 2014 Winter Olympics | Senior | 3; **73.04** | 3; **110.44** | 3; **183.48** |
| 6–9 February 2014 | 2014 Winter Olympics (team event) | Senior | | 3; **103.48** | 1 |
| 15–19 January 2014 | 2014 European Championships | Senior | 2; **69.54** | 2; **100.97** | 2; **170.51** |
| 24–27 December 2013 | 2014 Russian Championships | Senior | 2; 68.67 | 2; 99.34 | 2; 168.01 |
| 15–17 November 2013 | 2013 Trophée Éric Bompard | Senior | 3; **69.07** | 2; **102.82** | 2; **171.89** |
| 8–10 November 2013 | 2013 NHK Trophy | Senior | 4; 61.35 | 4; 94.02 | 4; 155.37 |
2012–13 season
| Date | Event | Level | SD | FD | Total |
| 10–17 March 2013 | 2013 World Championships | Senior | 9; 66.07 | 10; 91.45 | 9; 157.52 |
| 23–27 January 2013 | 2013 European Championships | Senior | 2; **68.98** | 1; **100.16** | 2; **169.14** |
| 25–28 December 2012 | 2013 Russian Championships | Senior | 2; 66.14 | 2; 105.53 | 2; 171.67 |
| 6–9 December 2012 | 2012–13 Grand Prix Final | Senior | 6; 63.56 | 5; 92.80 | 6; 156.36 |
| 22–25 November 2012 | 2012 NHK Trophy | Senior | 3; 59.96 | 2; 96.66 | 2; 156.62 |
| 8–11 November 2012 | 2012 Rostelecom Cup | Senior | 2; 65.70 | 2; 92.76 | 2; 158.46 |
| 30 October – 4 November 2012 | 2012 Crystal Skate | Senior | 1; 70.95 | 1; 103.61 | 1; 174.56 |
2011–12 season
| Date | Event | Level | SD | FD | Total |
| 18–22 April 2012 | 2012 World Team Trophy | Senior | 5; 60.44 | 5; 86.40 | 5T/5P; 146.84 |
| 26–29 March 2012 | 2012 World Championships | Senior | 5; 65.34 | 5; 95.66 | 5; **161.00** |
| 23–29 January 2012 | 2012 European Championships | Senior | 7; 59.49 | 3; 93.63 | 3; 153.12 |
| 25–29 December 2011 | 2012 Russian Championships | Senior | 2; 66.94 | 2; 95.00 | 2; 161.94 |
| 18–20 November 2011 | 2011 Trophée Eric Bompard | Senior | 4; 58.17 | 4; 82.15 | 4; 140.32 |
| 11–13 November 2011 | 2011 NHK Trophy | Senior | 1; 61.83 | 3; 87.65 | 3; 149.48 |
2010–11 season
| Date | Event | Level | SD | FD | Total |
| 24 April – 1 May 2011 | 2011 World Championships | Senior | 6; 65.51 | 10; 88.99 | 7; 154.50 |
| 24–30 January 2011 | 2011 European Championships | Senior | 4; 60.93 | 4; 92.55 | 4; 153.48 |
| 26–29 December 2010 | 2011 Russian Championships | Senior | 2; 62.30 | 4; 87.42 | 3; 149.72 |
| 19–21 November 2010 | 2010 Cup of Russia | Senior | 6; 49.14 | 2; 85.65 | 3; 134.79 |
| 22–24 October 2010 | 2010 NHK Trophy | Senior | 3; 56.89 | 4; 78.16 | 4; 135.05 |
2009–10 season
| Date | Event | Level | OD | FD | Total |
| 8–14 March 2010 | 2010 World Junior Championships | Junior | 1; 59.94 | 1; 90.82 | 1; 188.28 |
| 3–6 February 2010 | 2010 Russian Junior Championships | Junior | 2 – | 2 – | 2; 184.51 |
| 3–6 December 2009 | 2009 JGP Final | Junior | 3; 54.35 | 2; 85.01 | 2; 139.36 |
| 9–13 September 2009 | 2009 JGP Poland | Junior | 1; 54.03 | 1; 82.56 | 1; 171.61 |
| 26 August – 30 September 2009 | 2009 JGP Hungary | Junior | 1; 50.46 | 1; 81.50 | 1; 166.06 |
