= 2011–12 ISU World Standings and Season's World Ranking =

Merit-based ice skating ranking

Season-end No. 1 skaters
- Men's singles: (Canada) Patrick Chan
- Ladies' singles: (Italy) Carolina Kostner
- Pairs: (Germany) Aliona Savchenko / Robin Szolkowy
- Ice dance: (United States) Meryl Davis / Charlie White

Season's No. 1 skaters
- Men's singles: (Canada) Patrick Chan
- Ladies' singles: (Italy) Carolina Kostner
- Pairs: (Russia) Tatiana Volosozhar / Maxim Trankov
- Ice dance: (Canada) Tessa Virtue / Scott Moir

Navigation

The 2011–12 ISU World Standings and Season's World Ranking are the World Standings and Season's World Ranking published by the International Skating Union (ISU) during the 2011–12 season.

The 2011–12 ISU World Standings for single & pair skating and ice dance, are taking into account results of the 2009–10, 2010–11 and 2011–12 seasons.

The 2011–12 ISU Season's World Ranking is based on the results of the 2011–12 season only.

The 2011–12 ISU World standings for synchronized skating, are based on the results of the 2009–10, 2010–11 and 2011–12 seasons.

== World Standings for single & pair skating and ice dance ==
=== Season-end standings ===
The remainder of this section is a complete list, by discipline, published by the ISU.

==== Men's singles (181 skaters) ====
As of 9 April 2012

Rank	Nation	Skater	Points	Season	ISU Championships or Olympics	(Junior) Grand Prix and Final		Selected International Competition	
Rank	Nation	Skater	Points	Season	Best	Best	2nd Best	Best	2nd Best
1	CAN	Patrick Chan	4800	2011/2012 season (100%)	1200	800	400	0	0
1	CAN	Patrick Chan	4800	2010/2011 season (100%)	1200	800	400	0	0
1	CAN	Patrick Chan	4800	2009/2010 season (70%)	756	165	0	0	0
2	JPN	Daisuke Takahashi	4198	2011/2012 season (100%)	1080	720	400	0	0
2	JPN	Daisuke Takahashi	4198	2010/2011 season (100%)	840	583	400	0	0
2	JPN	Daisuke Takahashi	4198	2009/2010 season (70%)	840	368	252	175	0
3	CZE	Michal Brezina	3729	2011/2012 season (100%)	709	472	400	225	0
3	CZE	Michal Brezina	3729	2010/2011 season (100%)	875	0	0	250	225
3	CZE	Michal Brezina	3729	2009/2010 season (70%)	613	227	204	142	127
4	JPN	Yuzuru Hanyu	3498	2011/2012 season (100%)	972	583	400	250	0
4	JPN	Yuzuru Hanyu	3498	2010/2011 season (100%)	756	292	213	0	0
4	JPN	Yuzuru Hanyu	3498	2009/2010 season (70%)	350	245	175	0	0
5	RUS	Artur Gachinski	3376	2011/2012 season (100%)	756	262	262	0	0
5	RUS	Artur Gachinski	3376	2010/2011 season (100%)	972	236	213	250	250
5	RUS	Artur Gachinski	3376	2009/2010 season (70%)	284	175	158	175	0
6	JPN	Takahiko Kozuka	3230	2011/2012 season (100%)	418	360	324	0	0
6	JPN	Takahiko Kozuka	3230	2010/2011 season (100%)	1080	648	400	0	0
6	JPN	Takahiko Kozuka	3230	2009/2010 season (70%)	402	252	149	0	0
7	USA	Jeremy Abbott	3172	2011/2012 season (100%)	574	525	400	225	0
7	USA	Jeremy Abbott	3172	2010/2011 season (100%)	680	360	324	0	0
7	USA	Jeremy Abbott	3172	2009/2010 season (70%)	551	408	280	0	0
8	JPN	Nobunari Oda	3100	2011/2012 season (100%)	0	360	213	0	0
8	JPN	Nobunari Oda	3100	2010/2011 season (100%)	709	720	360	0	0
8	JPN	Nobunari Oda	3100	2009/2010 season (70%)	447	504	280	0	0
9	FRA	Florent Amodio	2925	2011/2012 season (100%)	787	262	0	0	0
9	FRA	Florent Amodio	2925	2010/2011 season (100%)	840	472	360	0	0
9	FRA	Florent Amodio	2925	2009/2010 season (70%)	264	204	0	0	0
10	CZE	Tomáš Verner	2923	2011/2012 season (100%)	551	262	0	0	0
10	CZE	Tomáš Verner	2923	2010/2011 season (100%)	680	525	400	0	0
10	CZE	Tomáš Verner	2923	2009/2010 season (70%)	228	330	252	175	0
11	ESP	Javier Fernandez	2915	2011/2012 season (100%)	517	648	360	182	0
11	ESP	Javier Fernandez	2915	2010/2011 season (100%)	465	262	0	164	0
11	ESP	Javier Fernandez	2915	2009/2010 season (70%)	281	0	0	175	142
12	ITA	Samuel Contesti	2891	2011/2012 season (100%)	465	292	191	250	203
12	ITA	Samuel Contesti	2891	2010/2011 season (100%)	496	292	236	250	203
12	ITA	Samuel Contesti	2891	2009/2010 season (70%)	447	204	183	175	158
13	FRA	Brian Joubert	2657	2011/2012 season (100%)	875	0	0	250	0
13	FRA	Brian Joubert	2657	2010/2011 season (100%)	756	292	0	0	0
13	FRA	Brian Joubert	2657	2009/2010 season (70%)	680	280	204	0	0
14	BEL	Kevin van der Perren	2523	2011/2012 season (100%)	275	360	191	225	0
14	BEL	Kevin van der Perren	2523	2010/2011 season (100%)	612	236	191	164	0
14	BEL	Kevin van der Perren	2523	2009/2010 season (70%)	402	183	0	142	0
15	USA	Adam Rippon	2400	2011/2012 season (100%)	612	292	292	0	0
15	USA	Adam Rippon	2400	2010/2011 season (100%)	551	324	292	0	0
15	USA	Adam Rippon	2400	2009/2010 season (70%)	588	227	165	0	0
16	KAZ	Denis Ten	2393	2011/2012 season (100%)	638	262	262	250	225
16	KAZ	Denis Ten	2393	2010/2011 season (100%)	305	0	0	0	0
16	KAZ	Denis Ten	2393	2009/2010 season (70%)	293	149	0	175	127
17	SWE	Alexander Majorov	2360	2011/2012 season (100%)	293	236	0	250	182
17	SWE	Alexander Majorov	2360	2010/2011 season (100%)	405	203	164	250	250
17	SWE	Alexander Majorov	2360	2009/2010 season (70%)	167	127	104	158	142
18	JPN	Tatsuki Machida	2200	2011/2012 season (100%)	446	213	0	250	0
18	JPN	Tatsuki Machida	2200	2010/2011 season (100%)	0	262	0	250	250
18	JPN	Tatsuki Machida	2200	2009/2010 season (70%)	529	0	0	0	0
19	USA	Ross Miner	2070	2011/2012 season (100%)	680	324	236	0	0
19	USA	Ross Miner	2070	2010/2011 season (100%)	418	213	0	0	0
19	USA	Ross Miner	2070	2009/2010 season (70%)	0	199	175	0	0
20	FRA	Alban Préaubert	2014	2011/2012 season (100%)	0	0	0	0	0
20	FRA	Alban Préaubert	2014	2010/2011 season (100%)	325	262	236	203	0
20	FRA	Alban Préaubert	2014	2009/2010 season (70%)	312	227	149	158	142
21	CHN	Han Yan	1925	2011/2012 season (100%)	500	315	250	0	0
21	CHN	Han Yan	1925	2010/2011 season (100%)	295	315	250	0	0
21	CHN	Han Yan	1925	2009/2010 season (70%)	0	175	0	0	0
22	SWE	Adrian Schultheiss	1904	2011/2012 season (100%)	0	0	0	164	164
22	SWE	Adrian Schultheiss	1904	2010/2011 season (100%)	237	213	0	225	225
22	SWE	Adrian Schultheiss	1904	2009/2010 season (70%)	362	165	149	158	142
23	USA	Richard Dornbush	1882	2011/2012 season (100%)	237	292	236	0	0
23	USA	Richard Dornbush	1882	2010/2011 season (100%)	517	350	250	0	0
23	USA	Richard Dornbush	1882	2009/2010 season (70%)	0	178	175	0	0
24	RUS	Evgeni Plushenko	1876	2011/2012 season (100%)	840	0	0	0	0
24	RUS	Evgeni Plushenko	1876	2010/2011 season (100%)	0	0	0	0	0
24	RUS	Evgeni Plushenko	1876	2009/2010 season (70%)	756	280	0	0	0
25	CHN	Nan Song	1850	2011/2012 season (100%)	305	360	324	0	0
25	CHN	Nan Song	1850	2010/2011 season (100%)	362	236	0	0	0
25	CHN	Nan Song	1850	2009/2010 season (70%)	347	221	175	0	0
26	CAN	Kevin Reynolds	1840	2011/2012 season (100%)	402	213	0	0	0
26	CAN	Kevin Reynolds	1840	2010/2011 season (100%)	293	292	292	0	0
26	CAN	Kevin Reynolds	1840	2009/2010 season (70%)	476	165	134	0	0
27	CAN	Andrei Rogozine	1690	2011/2012 season (100%)	0	236	213	0	0
27	CAN	Andrei Rogozine	1690	2010/2011 season (100%)	500	284	250	0	0
27	CAN	Andrei Rogozine	1690	2009/2010 season (70%)	207	104	84	0	0
28	USA	Evan Lysacek	1680	2011/2012 season (100%)	0	0	0	0	0
28	USA	Evan Lysacek	1680	2010/2011 season (100%)	0	0	0	0	0
28	USA	Evan Lysacek	1680	2009/2010 season (70%)	840	560	280	0	0
29	JPN	Takahito Mura	1672	2011/2012 season (100%)	551	0	0	250	182
29	JPN	Takahito Mura	1672	2010/2011 season (100%)	0	236	0	250	203
29	JPN	Takahito Mura	1672	2009/2010 season (70%)	0	0	0	175	0
30	RUS	Konstantin Menshov	1653	2011/2012 season (100%)	0	236	191	203	0
30	RUS	Konstantin Menshov	1653	2010/2011 season (100%)	446	0	0	225	225
30	RUS	Konstantin Menshov	1653	2009/2010 season (70%)	0	0	0	127	115
31	USA	Jason Brown	1644	2011/2012 season (100%)	405	350	250	0	0
31	USA	Jason Brown	1644	2010/2011 season (100%)	266	225	148	0	0
31	USA	Jason Brown	1644	2009/2010 season (70%)	0	0	0	0	0
32	KAZ	Abzal Rakimgaliev	1543	2011/2012 season (100%)	140	0	0	250	182
32	KAZ	Abzal Rakimgaliev	1543	2010/2011 season (100%)	237	203	120	203	182
32	KAZ	Abzal Rakimgaliev	1543	2009/2010 season (70%)	166	0	0	0	0
33	BEL	Jorik Hendrickx	1538	2011/2012 season (100%)	362	0	0	250	225
33	BEL	Jorik Hendrickx	1538	2010/2011 season (100%)	180	148	133	164	0
33	BEL	Jorik Hendrickx	1538	2009/2010 season (70%)	80	76	0	0	0
34	JPN	Keiji Tanaka	1499	2011/2012 season (100%)	266	225	207	0	0
34	JPN	Keiji Tanaka	1499	2010/2011 season (100%)	450	203	148	0	0
34	JPN	Keiji Tanaka	1499	2009/2010 season (70%)	0	0	0	0	0
35	GER	Peter Liebers	1472	2011/2012 season (100%)	192	0	0	225	164
35	GER	Peter Liebers	1472	2010/2011 season (100%)	293	213	0	203	182
35	GER	Peter Liebers	1472	2009/2010 season (70%)	0	0	0	115	0
36	USA	Joshua Farris	1459	2011/2012 season (100%)	450	284	250	0	0
36	USA	Joshua Farris	1459	2010/2011 season (100%)	0	250	225	0	0
36	USA	Joshua Farris	1459	2009/2010 season (70%)	0	127	115	0	0
37	USA	Keegan Messing	1455	2011/2012 season (100%)	0	0	0	250	0
37	USA	Keegan Messing	1455	2010/2011 season (100%)	365	250	230	0	0
37	USA	Keegan Messing	1455	2009/2010 season (70%)	256	104	0	0	0
38	RUS	Sergei Voronov	1416	2011/2012 season (100%)	325	213	0	0	0
38	RUS	Sergei Voronov	1416	2010/2011 season (100%)	0	0	0	0	0
38	RUS	Sergei Voronov	1416	2009/2010 season (70%)	213	227	165	158	115
39	USA	Brandon Mroz	1395	2011/2012 season (100%)	0	0	0	0	0
39	USA	Brandon Mroz	1395	2010/2011 season (100%)	0	360	324	0	0
39	USA	Brandon Mroz	1395	2009/2010 season (70%)	428	149	134	0	0
40	FRA	Chafik Besseghier	1393	2011/2012 season (100%)	264	0	0	250	225
40	FRA	Chafik Besseghier	1393	2010/2011 season (100%)	0	262	0	250	0
40	FRA	Chafik Besseghier	1393	2009/2010 season (70%)	0	0	0	142	142
41	JPN	Daisuke Murakami	1387	2011/2012 season (100%)	0	236	0	250	250
41	JPN	Daisuke Murakami	1387	2010/2011 season (100%)	0	262	0	225	164
41	JPN	Daisuke Murakami	1387	2009/2010 season (70%)	0	0	0	0	0
42	UKR	Anton Kovalevski	1302	2011/2012 season (100%)	0	0	0	0	0
42	UKR	Anton Kovalevski	1302	2010/2011 season (100%)	247	191	0	203	203
42	UKR	Anton Kovalevski	1302	2009/2010 season (70%)	173	0	0	158	127
43	USA	Armin Mahbanoozadeh	1279	2011/2012 season (100%)	0	191	0	0	0
43	USA	Armin Mahbanoozadeh	1279	2010/2011 season (100%)	446	324	0	182	0
43	USA	Armin Mahbanoozadeh	1279	2009/2010 season (70%)	136	0	0	0	0
44	ITA	Paolo Bacchini	1270	2011/2012 season (100%)	173	0	0	225	0
44	ITA	Paolo Bacchini	1270	2010/2011 season (100%)	264	0	0	225	225
44	ITA	Paolo Bacchini	1270	2009/2010 season (70%)	121	0	0	158	0
45	FRA	Romain Ponsart	1247	2011/2012 season (100%)	0	191	0	203	164
45	FRA	Romain Ponsart	1247	2010/2011 season (100%)	93	164	164	164	0
45	FRA	Romain Ponsart	1247	2009/2010 season (70%)	0	104	104	0	0
46	RUS	Artur Dmitriev	1239	2011/2012 season (100%)	127	225	182	0	0
46	RUS	Artur Dmitriev	1239	2010/2011 season (100%)	239	225	182	0	0
46	RUS	Artur Dmitriev	1239	2009/2010 season (70%)	186	0	0	0	0
47	RUS	Zhan Bush	1214	2011/2012 season (100%)	328	0	0	0	0
47	RUS	Zhan Bush	1214	2010/2011 season (100%)	174	225	203	0	0
47	RUS	Zhan Bush	1214	2009/2010 season (70%)	0	142	142	0	0
48	MON	Kim Lucine	1206	2011/2012 season (100%)	237	0	0	203	203
48	MON	Kim Lucine	1206	2010/2011 season (100%)	156	0	0	225	182
48	MON	Kim Lucine	1206	2009/2010 season (70%)	0	0	0	0	0
49	USA	Johnny Weir	1202	2011/2012 season (100%)	0	0	0	0	0
49	USA	Johnny Weir	1202	2010/2011 season (100%)	0	0	0	0	0
49	USA	Johnny Weir	1202	2009/2010 season (70%)	496	454	252	0	0
50	CHN	Jialiang Wu	1087	2011/2012 season (100%)	173	191	0	0	0
50	CHN	Jialiang Wu	1087	2010/2011 season (100%)	402	213	0	0	0
50	CHN	Jialiang Wu	1087	2009/2010 season (70%)	281	0	0	0	0
51	UZB	Misha Ge	1076	2011/2012 season (100%)	362	0	0	225	225
51	UZB	Misha Ge	1076	2010/2011 season (100%)	264	0	0	0	0
51	UZB	Misha Ge	1076	2009/2010 season (70%)	0	0	0	0	0
52	AUT	Viktor Pfeifer	1030	2011/2012 season (100%)	140	0	0	225	203
52	AUT	Viktor Pfeifer	1030	2010/2011 season (100%)	140	0	0	164	0
52	AUT	Viktor Pfeifer	1030	2009/2010 season (70%)	113	0	0	158	115
53	CHN	Jinlin Guan	1012	2011/2012 season (100%)	325	0	0	0	0
53	CHN	Jinlin Guan	1012	2010/2011 season (100%)	496	191	0	0	0
53	CHN	Jinlin Guan	1012	2009/2010 season (70%)	253	0	0	0	0
54	JPN	Kento Nakamura	992	2011/2012 season (100%)	0	0	0	203	0
54	JPN	Kento Nakamura	992	2010/2011 season (100%)	127	120	108	0	0
54	JPN	Kento Nakamura	992	2009/2010 season (70%)	134	158	142	0	0
55	RUS	Gordei Gorshkov	989	2011/2012 season (100%)	0	225	0	0	0
55	RUS	Gordei Gorshkov	989	2010/2011 season (100%)	215	225	182	0	0
55	RUS	Gordei Gorshkov	989	2009/2010 season (70%)	0	142	142	0	0
56	USA	Max Aaron	972	2011/2012 season (100%)	0	0	0	164	0
56	USA	Max Aaron	972	2010/2011 season (100%)	328	255	225	0	0
56	USA	Max Aaron	972	2009/2010 season (70%)	0	0	0	0	0
57	CAN	Liam Firus	970	2011/2012 season (100%)	239	203	0	0	0
57	CAN	Liam Firus	970	2010/2011 season (100%)	68	203	164	0	0
57	CAN	Liam Firus	970	2009/2010 season (70%)	0	93	84	0	0
58	ROU	Zoltán Kelemen	969	2011/2012 season (100%)	214	0	0	225	203
58	ROU	Zoltán Kelemen	969	2010/2011 season (100%)	102	0	0	225	0
58	ROU	Zoltán Kelemen	969	2009/2010 season (70%)	88	0	0	0	0
59	GER	Martin Rappe	952	2011/2012 season (100%)	174	148	133	225	164
59	GER	Martin Rappe	952	2010/2011 season (100%)	0	108	0	0	0
59	GER	Martin Rappe	952	2009/2010 season (70%)	0	0	0	0	0
60	RUS	Artem Borodulin	938	2011/2012 season (100%)	0	0	0	182	0
60	RUS	Artem Borodulin	938	2010/2011 season (100%)	0	0	0	0	0
60	RUS	Artem Borodulin	938	2009/2010 season (70%)	237	227	134	158	0
61	USA	Grant Hochstein	895	2011/2012 season (100%)	0	0	0	164	0
61	USA	Grant Hochstein	895	2010/2011 season (100%)	0	0	0	182	0
61	USA	Grant Hochstein	895	2009/2010 season (70%)	230	161	158	0	0
62	USA	Stephen Carriere	894	2011/2012 season (100%)	0	0	0	250	203
62	USA	Stephen Carriere	894	2010/2011 season (100%)	0	0	0	0	0
62	USA	Stephen Carriere	894	2009/2010 season (70%)	0	165	134	142	0
63	CHN	He Zhang	889	2011/2012 season (100%)	295	225	164	0	0
63	CHN	He Zhang	889	2010/2011 season (100%)	0	108	97	0	0
63	CHN	He Zhang	889	2009/2010 season (70%)	0	0	0	0	0
64	FRA	Yannick Ponsero	888	2011/2012 season (100%)	0	0	0	0	0
64	FRA	Yannick Ponsero	888	2010/2011 season (100%)	0	0	0	0	0
64	FRA	Yannick Ponsero	888	2009/2010 season (70%)	347	183	183	175	0
65	JPN	Ryuichi Kihara	879	2011/2012 season (100%)	0	203	182	0	0
65	JPN	Ryuichi Kihara	879	2010/2011 season (100%)	194	203	97	0	0
65	JPN	Ryuichi Kihara	879	2009/2010 season (70%)	0	76	0	0	0
66	JPN	Ryuju Hino	843	2011/2012 season (100%)	215	250	230	0	0
66	JPN	Ryuju Hino	843	2010/2011 season (100%)	0	148	0	0	0
66	JPN	Ryuju Hino	843	2009/2010 season (70%)	0	0	0	0	0
67	ESP	Javier Raya	762	2011/2012 season (100%)	106	0	0	164	0
67	ESP	Javier Raya	762	2010/2011 season (100%)	126	0	0	182	0
67	ESP	Javier Raya	762	2009/2010 season (70%)	110	104	76	0	0
68	CHN	Jiaxing Liu	744	2011/2012 season (100%)	0	164	0	0	0
68	CHN	Jiaxing Liu	744	2010/2011 season (100%)	103	164	97	0	0
68	CHN	Jiaxing Liu	744	2009/2010 season (70%)	89	127	93	0	0
69	GER	Franz Streubel	725	2011/2012 season (100%)	0	0	0	250	203
69	GER	Franz Streubel	725	2010/2011 season (100%)	0	120	0	0	0
69	GER	Franz Streubel	725	2009/2010 season (70%)	0	84	68	0	0
70	USA	Timothy Dolensky	724	2011/2012 season (100%)	157	203	182	0	0
70	USA	Timothy Dolensky	724	2010/2011 season (100%)	0	182	0	0	0
70	USA	Timothy Dolensky	724	2009/2010 season (70%)	0	0	0	0	0
71	GER	Denis Wieczorek	684	2011/2012 season (100%)	0	0	0	182	0
71	GER	Denis Wieczorek	684	2010/2011 season (100%)	113	164	0	225	0
71	GER	Denis Wieczorek	684	2009/2010 season (70%)	0	0	0	0	0
72	USA	Douglas Razzano	663	2011/2012 season (100%)	0	213	0	225	0
72	USA	Douglas Razzano	663	2010/2011 season (100%)	0	0	0	225	0
72	USA	Douglas Razzano	663	2009/2010 season (70%)	0	0	0	0	0
73	EST	Viktor Romanenkov	626	2011/2012 season (100%)	83	148	108	0	0
73	EST	Viktor Romanenkov	626	2010/2011 season (100%)	83	120	0	0	0
73	EST	Viktor Romanenkov	626	2009/2010 season (70%)	0	84	0	0	0
74	CZE	Petr Coufal	617	2011/2012 season (100%)	93	120	0	0	0
74	CZE	Petr Coufal	617	2010/2011 season (100%)	75	133	120	0	0
74	CZE	Petr Coufal	617	2009/2010 season (70%)	43	76	0	0	0
75	FRA	Thomas Sosniak	609	2011/2012 season (100%)	0	97	0	0	0
75	FRA	Thomas Sosniak	609	2010/2011 season (100%)	0	182	148	182	0
75	FRA	Thomas Sosniak	609	2009/2010 season (70%)	0	0	0	0	0
76	ITA	Maurizio Zandron	600	2011/2012 season (100%)	68	133	120	182	0
76	ITA	Maurizio Zandron	600	2010/2011 season (100%)	0	97	0	0	0
76	ITA	Maurizio Zandron	600	2009/2010 season (70%)	0	0	0	0	0
77	JPN	Shoma Uno	579	2011/2012 season (100%)	194	203	182	0	0
77	JPN	Shoma Uno	579	2010/2011 season (100%)	0	0	0	0	0
77	JPN	Shoma Uno	579	2009/2010 season (70%)	0	0	0	0	0
78	RUS	Ivan Tretiakov	574	2011/2012 season (100%)	0	0	0	0	0
78	RUS	Ivan Tretiakov	574	2010/2011 season (100%)	0	191	0	225	0
78	RUS	Ivan Tretiakov	574	2009/2010 season (70%)	0	0	0	158	0
79	UKR	Stanislav Pertsov	572	2011/2012 season (100%)	0	120	97	0	0
79	UKR	Stanislav Pertsov	572	2010/2011 season (100%)	114	148	0	0	0
79	UKR	Stanislav Pertsov	572	2009/2010 season (70%)	0	93	0	0	0
80	SUI	Mikael Redin	549	2011/2012 season (100%)	0	0	0	182	0
80	SUI	Mikael Redin	549	2010/2011 season (100%)	0	0	0	203	164
80	SUI	Mikael Redin	549	2009/2010 season (70%)	0	0	0	0	0
81	CZE	Pavel Kaska	531	2011/2012 season (100%)	0	0	0	164	0
81	CZE	Pavel Kaska	531	2010/2011 season (100%)	0	0	0	203	164
81	CZE	Pavel Kaska	531	2009/2010 season (70%)	0	0	0	0	0
82	FIN	Viktor Zubik	522	2011/2012 season (100%)	0	108	0	182	0
82	FIN	Viktor Zubik	522	2010/2011 season (100%)	0	0	0	164	0
82	FIN	Viktor Zubik	522	2009/2010 season (70%)	0	68	0	0	0
83	DEN	Justus Strid	520	2011/2012 season (100%)	113	0	0	225	0
83	DEN	Justus Strid	520	2010/2011 season (100%)	0	0	0	182	0
83	DEN	Justus Strid	520	2009/2010 season (70%)	0	0	0	0	0
84	KOR	Dong-Won Lee	510	2011/2012 season (100%)	0	164	164	0	0
84	KOR	Dong-Won Lee	510	2010/2011 season (100%)	0	182	0	0	0
84	KOR	Dong-Won Lee	510	2009/2010 season (70%)	0	0	0	0	0
85	RUS	Maxim Kovtun	505	2011/2012 season (100%)	0	255	250	0	0
85	RUS	Maxim Kovtun	505	2010/2011 season (100%)	0	0	0	0	0
85	RUS	Maxim Kovtun	505	2009/2010 season (70%)	0	0	0	0	0
86	KOR	June Hyoung Lee	468	2011/2012 season (100%)	83	203	182	0	0
86	KOR	June Hyoung Lee	468	2010/2011 season (100%)	0	0	0	0	0
86	KOR	June Hyoung Lee	468	2009/2010 season (70%)	0	0	0	0	0
87	PHI	Christopher Caluza	467	2011/2012 season (100%)	264	0	0	203	0
87	PHI	Christopher Caluza	467	2010/2011 season (100%)	0	0	0	0	0
87	PHI	Christopher Caluza	467	2009/2010 season (70%)	0	0	0	0	0
88	POL	Maciej Cieplucha	456	2011/2012 season (100%)	126	0	0	203	0
88	POL	Maciej Cieplucha	456	2010/2011 season (100%)	0	0	0	0	0
88	POL	Maciej Cieplucha	456	2009/2010 season (70%)	0	0	0	127	0
89	CAN	Jeremy Ten	405	2011/2012 season (100%)	214	0	0	0	0
89	CAN	Jeremy Ten	405	2010/2011 season (100%)	0	191	0	0	0
89	CAN	Jeremy Ten	405	2009/2010 season (70%)	0	0	0	0	0
90	SUI	Stephane Walker	402	2011/2012 season (100%)	0	0	0	164	164
90	SUI	Stephane Walker	402	2010/2011 season (100%)	74	0	0	0	0
90	SUI	Stephane Walker	402	2009/2010 season (70%)	0	0	0	0	0
91	JPN	Yoji Tsuboi	393	2011/2012 season (100%)	0	133	0	0	0
91	JPN	Yoji Tsuboi	393	2010/2011 season (100%)	0	133	0	0	0
91	JPN	Yoji Tsuboi	393	2009/2010 season (70%)	0	0	0	127	0
92	RUS	Ivan Bariev	385	2011/2012 season (100%)	0	0	0	203	182
92	RUS	Ivan Bariev	385	2010/2011 season (100%)	0	0	0	0	0
92	RUS	Ivan Bariev	385	2009/2010 season (70%)	0	0	0	0	0
92	ITA	Paul Bonifacio Parkinson	385	2011/2012 season (100%)	0	0	0	0	0
92	ITA	Paul Bonifacio Parkinson	385	2010/2011 season (100%)	0	0	0	203	182
92	ITA	Paul Bonifacio Parkinson	385	2009/2010 season (70%)	0	0	0	0	0
94	KOR	Min-Seok Kim	384	2011/2012 season (100%)	192	0	0	0	0
94	KOR	Min-Seok Kim	384	2010/2011 season (100%)	192	0	0	0	0
94	KOR	Min-Seok Kim	384	2009/2010 season (70%)	150	0	0	0	0
95	RUS	Mark Shakhmatov	377	2011/2012 season (100%)	0	0	0	0	0
95	RUS	Mark Shakhmatov	377	2010/2011 season (100%)	0	120	0	0	0
95	RUS	Mark Shakhmatov	377	2009/2010 season (70%)	0	142	115	0	0
96	CAN	Samuel Morais	365	2011/2012 season (100%)	0	0	0	0	0
96	CAN	Samuel Morais	365	2010/2011 season (100%)	0	148	133	0	0
96	CAN	Samuel Morais	365	2009/2010 season (70%)	0	84	0	0	0
97	USA	Shotaro Omori	346	2011/2012 season (100%)	0	182	164	0	0
97	USA	Shotaro Omori	346	2010/2011 season (100%)	0	0	0	0	0
97	USA	Shotaro Omori	346	2009/2010 season (70%)	0	0	0	0	0
98	CAN	Nam Nguyen	344	2011/2012 season (100%)	141	203	0	0	0
98	CAN	Nam Nguyen	344	2010/2011 season (100%)	0	0	0	0	0
98	CAN	Nam Nguyen	344	2009/2010 season (70%)	0	0	0	0	0
99	JPN	Sei Kawahara	342	2011/2012 season (100%)	0	148	97	0	0
99	JPN	Sei Kawahara	342	2010/2011 season (100%)	0	97	0	0	0
99	JPN	Sei Kawahara	342	2009/2010 season (70%)	0	0	0	0	0
100	FIN	Matthias Versluis	333	2011/2012 season (100%)	61	108	0	164	0
100	FIN	Matthias Versluis	333	2010/2011 season (100%)	0	0	0	0	0
100	FIN	Matthias Versluis	333	2009/2010 season (70%)	0	0	0	0	0
101	TPE	Stephen Li-Chung Kuo	318	2011/2012 season (100%)	0	0	0	0	0
101	TPE	Stephen Li-Chung Kuo	318	2010/2011 season (100%)	113	0	0	0	0
101	TPE	Stephen Li-Chung Kuo	318	2009/2010 season (70%)	121	84	0	0	0
102	GER	Christopher Berneck	311	2011/2012 season (100%)	0	108	0	0	0
102	GER	Christopher Berneck	311	2010/2011 season (100%)	0	0	0	203	0
102	GER	Christopher Berneck	311	2009/2010 season (70%)	0	0	0	0	0
103	RUS	Stanislav Kovalev	300	2011/2012 season (100%)	0	0	0	0	0
103	RUS	Stanislav Kovalev	300	2010/2011 season (100%)	0	0	0	0	0
103	RUS	Stanislav Kovalev	300	2009/2010 season (70%)	0	158	142	0	0
104	USA	Philip Warren	296	2011/2012 season (100%)	0	148	148	0	0
104	USA	Philip Warren	296	2010/2011 season (100%)	0	0	0	0	0
104	USA	Philip Warren	296	2009/2010 season (70%)	0	0	0	0	0
105	JPN	Fumiya Itai	291	2011/2012 season (100%)	0	0	0	0	0
105	JPN	Fumiya Itai	291	2010/2011 season (100%)	0	164	0	0	0
105	JPN	Fumiya Itai	291	2009/2010 season (70%)	0	0	0	127	0
106	UKR	Dmitri Ignatenko	290	2011/2012 season (100%)	102	0	0	0	0
106	UKR	Dmitri Ignatenko	290	2010/2011 season (100%)	0	120	0	0	0
106	UKR	Dmitri Ignatenko	290	2009/2010 season (70%)	0	68	0	0	0
107	BRA	Kevin Alves	289	2011/2012 season (100%)	83	0	0	0	0
107	BRA	Kevin Alves	289	2010/2011 season (100%)	0	97	0	0	0
107	BRA	Kevin Alves	289	2009/2010 season (70%)	109	0	0	0	0
107	GER	Paul Fentz	289	2011/2012 season (100%)	156	133	0	0	0
107	GER	Paul Fentz	289	2010/2011 season (100%)	0	0	0	0	0
107	GER	Paul Fentz	289	2009/2010 season (70%)	0	0	0	0	0
109	AUS	Mark Webster	286	2011/2012 season (100%)	113	0	0	0	0
109	AUS	Mark Webster	286	2010/2011 season (100%)	173	0	0	0	0
109	AUS	Mark Webster	286	2009/2010 season (70%)	98	0	0	0	0
110	USA	Austin Kanallakan	285	2011/2012 season (100%)	0	0	0	0	0
110	USA	Austin Kanallakan	285	2010/2011 season (100%)	0	0	0	0	0
110	USA	Austin Kanallakan	285	2009/2010 season (70%)	0	158	127	0	0
111	CHN	Chao Yang	283	2011/2012 season (100%)	0	0	0	0	0
111	CHN	Chao Yang	283	2010/2011 season (100%)	0	0	0	0	0
111	CHN	Chao Yang	283	2009/2010 season (70%)	0	149	134	0	0
112	RUS	Vladislav Tarasenko	281	2011/2012 season (100%)	0	148	0	0	0
112	RUS	Vladislav Tarasenko	281	2010/2011 season (100%)	0	133	0	0	0
112	RUS	Vladislav Tarasenko	281	2009/2010 season (70%)	0	0	0	0	0
113	GER	Daniel Dotzauer	280	2011/2012 season (100%)	0	0	0	0	0
113	GER	Daniel Dotzauer	280	2010/2011 season (100%)	0	0	0	0	0
113	GER	Daniel Dotzauer	280	2009/2010 season (70%)	72	115	93	0	0
114	AUS	Brendan Kerry	266	2011/2012 season (100%)	126	0	0	0	0
114	AUS	Brendan Kerry	266	2010/2011 season (100%)	140	0	0	0	0
114	AUS	Brendan Kerry	266	2009/2010 season (70%)	0	0	0	0	0
115	TPE	Jordan Ju	258	2011/2012 season (100%)	102	0	0	0	0
115	TPE	Jordan Ju	258	2010/2011 season (100%)	156	0	0	0	0
115	TPE	Jordan Ju	258	2009/2010 season (70%)	0	0	0	0	0
116	SUI	Laurent Alvarez	256	2011/2012 season (100%)	0	0	0	0	0
116	SUI	Laurent Alvarez	256	2010/2011 season (100%)	92	0	0	164	0
116	SUI	Laurent Alvarez	256	2009/2010 season (70%)	0	0	0	0	0
116	FIN	Ari-Pekka Nurmenkari	256	2011/2012 season (100%)	0	0	0	0	0
116	FIN	Ari-Pekka Nurmenkari	256	2010/2011 season (100%)	0	0	0	182	0
116	FIN	Ari-Pekka Nurmenkari	256	2009/2010 season (70%)	74	0	0	0	0
118	RUS	Alexander Nikolaev	254	2011/2012 season (100%)	0	0	0	0	0
118	RUS	Alexander Nikolaev	254	2010/2011 season (100%)	0	0	0	0	0
118	RUS	Alexander Nikolaev	254	2009/2010 season (70%)	0	127	127	0	0
119	RUS	Denis Leushin	250	2011/2012 season (100%)	0	0	0	0	0
119	RUS	Denis Leushin	250	2010/2011 season (100%)	0	0	0	250	0
119	RUS	Denis Leushin	250	2009/2010 season (70%)	0	0	0	0	0
119	JPN	Akio Sasaki	250	2011/2012 season (100%)	0	0	0	0	0
119	JPN	Akio Sasaki	250	2010/2011 season (100%)	0	0	0	250	0
119	JPN	Akio Sasaki	250	2009/2010 season (70%)	0	0	0	0	0
119	RUS	Vladislav Sesganov	250	2011/2012 season (100%)	0	0	0	0	0
119	RUS	Vladislav Sesganov	250	2010/2011 season (100%)	0	0	0	250	0
119	RUS	Vladislav Sesganov	250	2009/2010 season (70%)	0	0	0	0	0
122	ISR	Maxim Shipov	247	2011/2012 season (100%)	0	0	0	0	0
122	ISR	Maxim Shipov	247	2010/2011 season (100%)	83	0	0	164	0
122	ISR	Maxim Shipov	247	2009/2010 season (70%)	0	0	0	0	0
123	SUI	Noah Scherer	241	2011/2012 season (100%)	0	108	0	0	0
123	SUI	Noah Scherer	241	2010/2011 season (100%)	0	133	0	0	0
123	SUI	Noah Scherer	241	2009/2010 season (70%)	0	0	0	0	0
124	UKR	Yakov Godorozha	240	2011/2012 season (100%)	0	120	120	0	0
124	UKR	Yakov Godorozha	240	2010/2011 season (100%)	0	0	0	0	0
124	UKR	Yakov Godorozha	240	2009/2010 season (70%)	0	0	0	0	0
125	CAN	Ronald Lam	239	2011/2012 season (100%)	0	0	0	0	0
125	CAN	Ronald Lam	239	2010/2011 season (100%)	0	0	0	0	0
125	CAN	Ronald Lam	239	2009/2010 season (70%)	48	115	76	0	0
126	BRA	Luiz Manella	236	2011/2012 season (100%)	103	133	0	0	0
126	BRA	Luiz Manella	236	2010/2011 season (100%)	0	0	0	0	0
126	BRA	Luiz Manella	236	2009/2010 season (70%)	0	0	0	0	0
127	PHI	Michael Christian Martinez	234	2011/2012 season (100%)	114	120	0	0	0
127	PHI	Michael Christian Martinez	234	2010/2011 season (100%)	0	0	0	0	0
127	PHI	Michael Christian Martinez	234	2009/2010 season (70%)	0	0	0	0	0
127	SUI	Jamal Othman	234	2011/2012 season (100%)	0	0	0	0	0
127	SUI	Jamal Othman	234	2010/2011 season (100%)	0	0	0	0	0
127	SUI	Jamal Othman	234	2009/2010 season (70%)	92	0	0	142	0
129	RUS	Artem Grigoriev	225	2011/2012 season (100%)	0	0	0	0	0
129	RUS	Artem Grigoriev	225	2010/2011 season (100%)	0	225	0	0	0
129	RUS	Artem Grigoriev	225	2009/2010 season (70%)	0	0	0	0	0
130	JPN	Takuya Kondoh	223	2011/2012 season (100%)	0	0	0	0	0
130	JPN	Takuya Kondoh	223	2010/2011 season (100%)	0	108	0	0	0
130	JPN	Takuya Kondoh	223	2009/2010 season (70%)	0	115	0	0	0
131	ISR	Alexei Bychenko	219	2011/2012 season (100%)	92	0	0	0	0
131	ISR	Alexei Bychenko	219	2010/2011 season (100%)	0	0	0	0	0
131	ISR	Alexei Bychenko	219	2009/2010 season (70%)	0	0	0	127	0
132	BLR	Pavel Ignatenko	217	2011/2012 season (100%)	0	120	97	0	0
132	BLR	Pavel Ignatenko	217	2010/2011 season (100%)	0	0	0	0	0
132	BLR	Pavel Ignatenko	217	2009/2010 season (70%)	0	0	0	0	0
133	TPE	Wun-Chang Shih	205	2011/2012 season (100%)	0	0	0	0	0
133	TPE	Wun-Chang Shih	205	2010/2011 season (100%)	126	0	0	0	0
133	TPE	Wun-Chang Shih	205	2009/2010 season (70%)	79	0	0	0	0
133	SWE	Ondrej Spiegl	205	2011/2012 season (100%)	0	0	0	0	0
133	SWE	Ondrej Spiegl	205	2010/2011 season (100%)	0	108	97	0	0
133	SWE	Ondrej Spiegl	205	2009/2010 season (70%)	0	0	0	0	0
135	FIN	Julian Lagus	203	2011/2012 season (100%)	0	0	0	203	0
135	FIN	Julian Lagus	203	2010/2011 season (100%)	0	0	0	0	0
135	FIN	Julian Lagus	203	2009/2010 season (70%)	0	0	0	0	0
136	USA	Alexander Zahradnicek	201	2011/2012 season (100%)	0	0	0	0	0
136	USA	Alexander Zahradnicek	201	2010/2011 season (100%)	0	108	0	0	0
136	USA	Alexander Zahradnicek	201	2009/2010 season (70%)	0	93	0	0	0
137	FRA	Paul Emmanuel Richardeau	191	2011/2012 season (100%)	0	0	0	0	0
137	FRA	Paul Emmanuel Richardeau	191	2010/2011 season (100%)	0	0	0	0	0
137	FRA	Paul Emmanuel Richardeau	191	2009/2010 season (70%)	0	76	0	115	0
138	GBR	Harry Mattick	183	2011/2012 season (100%)	75	0	0	0	0
138	GBR	Harry Mattick	183	2010/2011 season (100%)	0	108	0	0	0
138	GBR	Harry Mattick	183	2009/2010 season (70%)	0	0	0	0	0
139	USA	Jonathan Cassar	182	2011/2012 season (100%)	0	0	0	182	0
139	USA	Jonathan Cassar	182	2010/2011 season (100%)	0	0	0	0	0
139	USA	Jonathan Cassar	182	2009/2010 season (70%)	0	0	0	0	0
139	TUR	Kutay Eryoldas	182	2011/2012 season (100%)	0	0	0	0	0
139	TUR	Kutay Eryoldas	182	2010/2011 season (100%)	0	0	0	182	0
139	TUR	Kutay Eryoldas	182	2009/2010 season (70%)	0	0	0	0	0
139	RUS	Mikhail Kolyada	182	2011/2012 season (100%)	0	182	0	0	0
139	RUS	Mikhail Kolyada	182	2010/2011 season (100%)	0	0	0	0	0
139	RUS	Mikhail Kolyada	182	2009/2010 season (70%)	0	0	0	0	0
139	GER	Viktor Kremke	182	2011/2012 season (100%)	0	0	0	0	0
139	GER	Viktor Kremke	182	2010/2011 season (100%)	0	0	0	182	0
139	GER	Viktor Kremke	182	2009/2010 season (70%)	0	0	0	0	0
143	FRA	Morgan Ciprès	175	2011/2012 season (100%)	0	0	0	0	0
143	FRA	Morgan Ciprès	175	2010/2011 season (100%)	0	0	0	0	0
143	FRA	Morgan Ciprès	175	2009/2010 season (70%)	99	76	0	0	0
143	JPN	Kensuke Nakaniwa	175	2011/2012 season (100%)	0	0	0	0	0
143	JPN	Kensuke Nakaniwa	175	2010/2011 season (100%)	0	0	0	0	0
143	JPN	Kensuke Nakaniwa	175	2009/2010 season (70%)	0	0	0	175	0
145	ARM	Slavik Hayrapetyan	164	2011/2012 season (100%)	0	0	0	164	0
145	ARM	Slavik Hayrapetyan	164	2010/2011 season (100%)	0	0	0	0	0
145	ARM	Slavik Hayrapetyan	164	2009/2010 season (70%)	0	0	0	0	0
145	ROU	Vlad Ionescu	164	2011/2012 season (100%)	0	0	0	0	0
145	ROU	Vlad Ionescu	164	2010/2011 season (100%)	0	0	0	164	0
145	ROU	Vlad Ionescu	164	2009/2010 season (70%)	0	0	0	0	0
145	USA	David Wang	164	2011/2012 season (100%)	0	164	0	0	0
145	USA	David Wang	164	2010/2011 season (100%)	0	0	0	0	0
145	USA	David Wang	164	2009/2010 season (70%)	0	0	0	0	0
145	USA	Jay Yostanto	164	2011/2012 season (100%)	0	164	0	0	0
145	USA	Jay Yostanto	164	2010/2011 season (100%)	0	0	0	0	0
145	USA	Jay Yostanto	164	2009/2010 season (70%)	0	0	0	0	0
149	ITA	Karel Zelenka	158	2011/2012 season (100%)	0	0	0	0	0
149	ITA	Karel Zelenka	158	2010/2011 season (100%)	0	0	0	0	0
149	ITA	Karel Zelenka	158	2009/2010 season (70%)	0	0	0	158	0
150	KOR	Alex Kang Chan Kam	156	2011/2012 season (100%)	156	0	0	0	0
150	KOR	Alex Kang Chan Kam	156	2010/2011 season (100%)	0	0	0	0	0
150	KOR	Alex Kang Chan Kam	156	2009/2010 season (70%)	0	0	0	0	0
151	USA	Harrison Choate	148	2011/2012 season (100%)	0	148	0	0	0
151	USA	Harrison Choate	148	2010/2011 season (100%)	0	0	0	0	0
151	USA	Harrison Choate	148	2009/2010 season (70%)	0	0	0	0	0
152	CZE	Petr Bidar	138	2011/2012 season (100%)	0	0	0	0	0
152	CZE	Petr Bidar	138	2010/2011 season (100%)	0	0	0	0	0
152	CZE	Petr Bidar	138	2009/2010 season (70%)	34	104	0	0	0
153	CAN	Samuel Angers	133	2011/2012 season (100%)	0	133	0	0	0
153	CAN	Samuel Angers	133	2010/2011 season (100%)	0	0	0	0	0
153	CAN	Samuel Angers	133	2009/2010 season (70%)	0	0	0	0	0
153	CAN	Mitchell Gordon	133	2011/2012 season (100%)	0	133	0	0	0
153	CAN	Mitchell Gordon	133	2010/2011 season (100%)	0	0	0	0	0
153	CAN	Mitchell Gordon	133	2009/2010 season (70%)	0	0	0	0	0
153	CHN	Zuoren Xu	133	2011/2012 season (100%)	0	0	0	0	0
153	CHN	Zuoren Xu	133	2010/2011 season (100%)	0	133	0	0	0
153	CHN	Zuoren Xu	133	2009/2010 season (70%)	0	0	0	0	0
156	GER	Philipp Tischendorf	127	2011/2012 season (100%)	0	0	0	0	0
156	GER	Philipp Tischendorf	127	2010/2011 season (100%)	0	0	0	0	0
156	GER	Philipp Tischendorf	127	2009/2010 season (70%)	0	0	0	127	0
157	GER	Clemens Brummer	115	2011/2012 season (100%)	0	0	0	0	0
157	GER	Clemens Brummer	115	2010/2011 season (100%)	0	0	0	0	0
157	GER	Clemens Brummer	115	2009/2010 season (70%)	0	0	0	115	0
157	USA	Eliot Halverson	115	2011/2012 season (100%)	0	0	0	0	0
157	USA	Eliot Halverson	115	2010/2011 season (100%)	0	0	0	0	0
157	USA	Eliot Halverson	115	2009/2010 season (70%)	0	115	0	0	0
157	AUT	Mario-Rafael Ionian	115	2011/2012 season (100%)	0	0	0	0	0
157	AUT	Mario-Rafael Ionian	115	2010/2011 season (100%)	0	0	0	0	0
157	AUT	Mario-Rafael Ionian	115	2009/2010 season (70%)	0	0	0	115	0
157	JPN	Takemochi Ogami	115	2011/2012 season (100%)	0	0	0	0	0
157	JPN	Takemochi Ogami	115	2010/2011 season (100%)	0	0	0	0	0
157	JPN	Takemochi Ogami	115	2009/2010 season (70%)	0	0	0	115	0
161	POL	Kamil Bialas	112	2011/2012 season (100%)	0	0	0	0	0
161	POL	Kamil Bialas	112	2010/2011 season (100%)	44	0	0	0	0
161	POL	Kamil Bialas	112	2009/2010 season (70%)	0	68	0	0	0
162	CAN	Peter O Brien	108	2011/2012 season (100%)	0	108	0	0	0
162	CAN	Peter O Brien	108	2010/2011 season (100%)	0	0	0	0	0
162	CAN	Peter O Brien	108	2009/2010 season (70%)	0	0	0	0	0
162	GER	Niko Ulanovsky	108	2011/2012 season (100%)	0	108	0	0	0
162	GER	Niko Ulanovsky	108	2010/2011 season (100%)	0	0	0	0	0
162	GER	Niko Ulanovsky	108	2009/2010 season (70%)	0	0	0	0	0
164	CAN	Christophe Belley-Lemelin	97	2011/2012 season (100%)	0	97	0	0	0
164	CAN	Christophe Belley-Lemelin	97	2010/2011 season (100%)	0	0	0	0	0
164	CAN	Christophe Belley-Lemelin	97	2009/2010 season (70%)	0	0	0	0	0
164	FRA	Simon Hocquaux	97	2011/2012 season (100%)	0	97	0	0	0
164	FRA	Simon Hocquaux	97	2010/2011 season (100%)	0	0	0	0	0
164	FRA	Simon Hocquaux	97	2009/2010 season (70%)	0	0	0	0	0
164	FRA	Charles Tetar	97	2011/2012 season (100%)	0	97	0	0	0
164	FRA	Charles Tetar	97	2010/2011 season (100%)	0	0	0	0	0
164	FRA	Charles Tetar	97	2009/2010 season (70%)	0	0	0	0	0
167	USA	Steven Evans	93	2011/2012 season (100%)	0	0	0	0	0
167	USA	Steven Evans	93	2010/2011 season (100%)	0	0	0	0	0
167	USA	Steven Evans	93	2009/2010 season (70%)	0	93	0	0	0
167	USA	Andrew Gonzales	93	2011/2012 season (100%)	0	0	0	0	0
167	USA	Andrew Gonzales	93	2010/2011 season (100%)	0	0	0	0	0
167	USA	Andrew Gonzales	93	2009/2010 season (70%)	0	93	0	0	0
169	AUS	Matthew Precious	88	2011/2012 season (100%)	0	0	0	0	0
169	AUS	Matthew Precious	88	2010/2011 season (100%)	0	0	0	0	0
169	AUS	Matthew Precious	88	2009/2010 season (70%)	88	0	0	0	0
170	FIN	Bela Papp	86	2011/2012 season (100%)	0	0	0	0	0
170	FIN	Bela Papp	86	2010/2011 season (100%)	55	0	0	0	0
170	FIN	Bela Papp	86	2009/2010 season (70%)	31	0	0	0	0
171	SVK	Peter Reitmayer	84	2011/2012 season (100%)	0	0	0	0	0
171	SVK	Peter Reitmayer	84	2010/2011 season (100%)	0	0	0	0	0
171	SVK	Peter Reitmayer	84	2009/2010 season (70%)	0	84	0	0	0
172	CAN	Vaughn Chipeur	83	2011/2012 season (100%)	0	0	0	0	0
172	CAN	Vaughn Chipeur	83	2010/2011 season (100%)	0	0	0	0	0
172	CAN	Vaughn Chipeur	83	2009/2010 season (70%)	83	0	0	0	0
173	AUS	Nicholas Fernandez	74	2011/2012 season (100%)	74	0	0	0	0
173	AUS	Nicholas Fernandez	74	2010/2011 season (100%)	0	0	0	0	0
173	AUS	Nicholas Fernandez	74	2009/2010 season (70%)	0	0	0	0	0
174	ITA	Saverio Giacomelli	68	2011/2012 season (100%)	0	0	0	0	0
174	ITA	Saverio Giacomelli	68	2010/2011 season (100%)	0	0	0	0	0
174	ITA	Saverio Giacomelli	68	2009/2010 season (70%)	0	68	0	0	0
174	RUS	Alexander Stepanov	68	2011/2012 season (100%)	0	0	0	0	0
174	RUS	Alexander Stepanov	68	2010/2011 season (100%)	0	0	0	0	0
174	RUS	Alexander Stepanov	68	2009/2010 season (70%)	0	68	0	0	0
174	SVK	Jakub Strobl	68	2011/2012 season (100%)	0	0	0	0	0
174	SVK	Jakub Strobl	68	2010/2011 season (100%)	0	0	0	0	0
174	SVK	Jakub Strobl	68	2009/2010 season (70%)	0	68	0	0	0
177	CHN	Wenbo Zang	65	2011/2012 season (100%)	0	0	0	0	0
177	CHN	Wenbo Zang	65	2010/2011 season (100%)	0	0	0	0	0
177	CHN	Wenbo Zang	65	2009/2010 season (70%)	65	0	0	0	0
178	POL	Sebastian Iwasaki	58	2011/2012 season (100%)	0	0	0	0	0
178	POL	Sebastian Iwasaki	58	2010/2011 season (100%)	0	0	0	0	0
178	POL	Sebastian Iwasaki	58	2009/2010 season (70%)	58	0	0	0	0
179	BLR	Vitali Luchanok	49	2011/2012 season (100%)	0	0	0	0	0
179	BLR	Vitali Luchanok	49	2010/2011 season (100%)	49	0	0	0	0
179	BLR	Vitali Luchanok	49	2009/2010 season (70%)	0	0	0	0	0
179	TPE	Chih-I Tsao	49	2011/2012 season (100%)	49	0	0	0	0
179	TPE	Chih-I Tsao	49	2010/2011 season (100%)	0	0	0	0	0
179	TPE	Chih-I Tsao	49	2009/2010 season (70%)	0	0	0	0	0
181	SWE	Marcus Björk	44	2011/2012 season (100%)	44	0	0	0	0
181	SWE	Marcus Björk	44	2010/2011 season (100%)	0	0	0	0	0
181	SWE	Marcus Björk	44	2009/2010 season (70%)	0	0	0	0	0

==== Ladies' singles (209 skaters) ====
As of 9 April 2012

Rank	Nation	Skater	Points	Season	ISU Championships or Olympics	(Junior) Grand Prix and Final		Selected International Competition	
Rank	Nation	Skater	Points	Season	Best	Best	2nd Best	Best	2nd Best
1	ITA	Carolina Kostner	5167	2011/2012 season (100%)	1200	800	400	250	0
1	ITA	Carolina Kostner	5167	2010/2011 season (100%)	972	720	400	250	0
1	ITA	Carolina Kostner	5167	2009/2010 season (70%)	588	165	165	175	0
2	JPN	Akiko Suzuki	4333	2011/2012 season (100%)	972	720	400	0	0
2	JPN	Akiko Suzuki	4333	2010/2011 season (100%)	446	583	360	250	250
2	JPN	Akiko Suzuki	4333	2009/2010 season (70%)	529	454	280	175	0
3	RUS	Alena Leonova	4245	2011/2012 season (100%)	1080	648	360	0	0
3	RUS	Alena Leonova	4245	2010/2011 season (100%)	875	324	0	250	203
3	RUS	Alena Leonova	4245	2009/2010 season (70%)	362	330	252	175	0
4	JPN	Miki Ando	3522	2011/2012 season (100%)	0	0	0	0	0
4	JPN	Miki Ando	3522	2010/2011 season (100%)	1200	525	400	0	0
4	JPN	Miki Ando	3522	2009/2010 season (70%)	613	504	280	0	0
5	USA	Alissa Czisny	3421	2011/2012 season (100%)	131	525	400	203	0
5	USA	Alissa Czisny	3421	2010/2011 season (100%)	787	800	400	0	0
5	USA	Alissa Czisny	3421	2009/2010 season (70%)	0	252	204	175	0
6	FIN	Kiira Korpi	3417	2011/2012 season (100%)	756	262	236	0	0
6	FIN	Kiira Korpi	3417	2010/2011 season (100%)	680	400	292	250	225
6	FIN	Kiira Korpi	3417	2009/2010 season (70%)	428	252	134	158	142
7	JPN	Kanako Murakami	3121	2011/2012 season (100%)	787	292	236	0	0
7	JPN	Kanako Murakami	3121	2010/2011 season (100%)	574	648	400	0	0
7	JPN	Kanako Murakami	3121	2009/2010 season (70%)	350	245	175	175	0
8	JPN	Mao Asada	2870	2011/2012 season (100%)	756	400	360	0	0
8	JPN	Mao Asada	2870	2010/2011 season (100%)	756	262	191	0	0
8	JPN	Mao Asada	2870	2009/2010 season (70%)	840	252	183	0	0
9	USA	Mirai Nagasu	2817	2011/2012 season (100%)	0	360	262	250	0
9	USA	Mirai Nagasu	2817	2010/2011 season (100%)	680	360	292	0	0
9	USA	Mirai Nagasu	2817	2009/2010 season (70%)	613	204	183	0	0
10	SWE	Viktoria Helgesson	2801	2011/2012 season (100%)	551	324	262	250	182
10	SWE	Viktoria Helgesson	2801	2010/2011 season (100%)	496	236	0	250	250
10	SWE	Viktoria Helgesson	2801	2009/2010 season (70%)	326	0	0	175	115
11	KOR	Yuna Kim	2760	2011/2012 season (100%)	0	0	0	0	0
11	KOR	Yuna Kim	2760	2010/2011 season (100%)	1080	0	0	0	0
11	KOR	Yuna Kim	2760	2009/2010 season (70%)	840	560	280	0	0
12	RUS	Ksenia Makarova	2560	2011/2012 season (100%)	517	262	213	0	0
12	RUS	Ksenia Makarova	2560	2010/2011 season (100%)	638	360	213	182	0
12	RUS	Ksenia Makarova	2560	2009/2010 season (70%)	402	178	158	175	0
13	JPN	Haruka Imai	2484	2011/2012 season (100%)	362	292	236	0	0
13	JPN	Haruka Imai	2484	2010/2011 season (100%)	0	262	236	250	203
13	JPN	Haruka Imai	2484	2009/2010 season (70%)	386	142	0	142	115
14	RUS	Adelina Sotnikova	2403	2011/2012 season (100%)	405	324	324	250	0
14	RUS	Adelina Sotnikova	2403	2010/2011 season (100%)	500	350	250	0	0
14	RUS	Adelina Sotnikova	2403	2009/2010 season (70%)	0	0	0	0	0
15	USA	Rachael Flatt	2347	2011/2012 season (100%)	0	0	0	0	0
15	USA	Rachael Flatt	2347	2010/2011 season (100%)	612	472	360	0	0
15	USA	Rachael Flatt	2347	2009/2010 season (70%)	447	252	204	0	0
16	GEO	Elene Gedevanishvili	2305	2011/2012 season (100%)	680	262	213	225	0
16	GEO	Elene Gedevanishvili	2305	2010/2011 season (100%)	465	236	213	0	0
16	GEO	Elene Gedevanishvili	2305	2009/2010 season (70%)	476	165	149	0	0
17	USA	Ashley Wagner	2223	2011/2012 season (100%)	875	324	292	0	0
17	USA	Ashley Wagner	2223	2010/2011 season (100%)	0	324	262	0	0
17	USA	Ashley Wagner	2223	2009/2010 season (70%)	0	408	252	0	0
18	ITA	Valentina Marchei	2202	2011/2012 season (100%)	574	0	0	225	0
18	ITA	Valentina Marchei	2202	2010/2011 season (100%)	325	262	191	225	225
18	ITA	Valentina Marchei	2202	2009/2010 season (70%)	281	0	0	175	158
19	USA	Caroline Zhang	2193	2011/2012 season (100%)	680	236	0	250	0
19	USA	Caroline Zhang	2193	2010/2011 season (100%)	0	213	0	0	0
19	USA	Caroline Zhang	2193	2009/2010 season (70%)	476	204	134	0	0
20	CAN	Cynthia Phaneuf	2009	2011/2012 season (100%)	402	213	0	0	0
20	CAN	Cynthia Phaneuf	2009	2010/2011 season (100%)	496	292	292	0	0
20	CAN	Cynthia Phaneuf	2009	2009/2010 season (70%)	551	165	149	0	0
21	FRA	Maé-Bérénice Méité	1999	2011/2012 season (100%)	237	236	213	250	203
21	FRA	Maé-Bérénice Méité	1999	2010/2011 season (100%)	362	191	0	203	0
21	FRA	Maé-Bérénice Méité	1999	2009/2010 season (70%)	0	104	0	0	0
22	RUS	Elizaveta Tuktamysheva	1998	2011/2012 season (100%)	0	583	400	0	0
22	RUS	Elizaveta Tuktamysheva	1998	2010/2011 season (100%)	450	315	250	0	0
22	RUS	Elizaveta Tuktamysheva	1998	2009/2010 season (70%)	0	0	0	0	0
23	SWE	Joshi Helgesson	1940	2011/2012 season (100%)	325	0	0	225	203
23	SWE	Joshi Helgesson	1940	2010/2011 season (100%)	275	292	213	225	182
23	SWE	Joshi Helgesson	1940	2009/2010 season (70%)	151	0	0	158	142
24	GER	Sarah Hecken	1867	2011/2012 season (100%)	162	191	0	250	182
24	GER	Sarah Hecken	1867	2010/2011 season (100%)	418	0	0	225	203
24	GER	Sarah Hecken	1867	2009/2010 season (70%)	264	134	0	0	0
25	USA	Agnes Zawadzki	1833	2011/2012 season (100%)	496	213	191	0	0
25	USA	Agnes Zawadzki	1833	2010/2011 season (100%)	405	292	236	0	0
25	USA	Agnes Zawadzki	1833	2009/2010 season (70%)	315	0	0	0	0
26	CAN	Amelie Lacoste	1821	2011/2012 season (100%)	446	236	191	0	0
26	CAN	Amelie Lacoste	1821	2010/2011 season (100%)	362	324	262	0	0
26	CAN	Amelie Lacoste	1821	2009/2010 season (70%)	312	165	149	0	0
27	CHN	Zijun Li	1760	2011/2012 season (100%)	328	255	225	250	0
27	CHN	Zijun Li	1760	2010/2011 season (100%)	215	284	203	0	0
27	CHN	Zijun Li	1760	2009/2010 season (70%)	0	0	0	0	0
28	RUS	Polina Shelepen	1606	2011/2012 season (100%)	295	315	250	0	0
28	RUS	Polina Shelepen	1606	2010/2011 season (100%)	266	250	230	0	0
28	RUS	Polina Shelepen	1606	2009/2010 season (70%)	256	221	175	0	0
29	USA	Christina Gao	1542	2011/2012 season (100%)	266	262	0	0	0
29	USA	Christina Gao	1542	2010/2011 season (100%)	365	225	225	0	0
29	USA	Christina Gao	1542	2009/2010 season (70%)	167	199	142	0	0
30	ESP	Sonia Lafuente	1379	2011/2012 season (100%)	275	213	0	164	0
30	ESP	Sonia Lafuente	1379	2010/2011 season (100%)	264	213	0	250	0
30	ESP	Sonia Lafuente	1379	2009/2010 season (70%)	113	0	0	0	0
30	FRA	Yretha Silete	1379	2011/2012 season (100%)	377	191	0	0	0
30	FRA	Yretha Silete	1379	2010/2011 season (100%)	174	182	148	203	0
30	FRA	Yretha Silete	1379	2009/2010 season (70%)	0	104	68	0	0
32	EST	Elena Glebova	1377	2011/2012 season (100%)	339	0	0	250	250
32	EST	Elena Glebova	1377	2010/2011 season (100%)	131	0	0	0	0
32	EST	Elena Glebova	1377	2009/2010 season (70%)	228	183	0	127	0
33	JPN	Risa Shoji	1351	2011/2012 season (100%)	68	225	225	0	0
33	JPN	Risa Shoji	1351	2010/2011 season (100%)	328	255	250	0	0
33	JPN	Risa Shoji	1351	2009/2010 season (70%)	0	0	0	0	0
34	UKR	Natalia Popova	1334	2011/2012 season (100%)	264	133	0	225	225
34	UKR	Natalia Popova	1334	2010/2011 season (100%)	0	0	0	225	164
34	UKR	Natalia Popova	1334	2009/2010 season (70%)	98	0	0	0	0
35	CAN	Joannie Rochette	1328	2011/2012 season (100%)	0	0	0	0	0
35	CAN	Joannie Rochette	1328	2010/2011 season (100%)	0	0	0	0	0
35	CAN	Joannie Rochette	1328	2009/2010 season (70%)	680	368	280	0	0
36	EST	Gerli Liinamäe	1322	2011/2012 season (100%)	127	182	182	225	0
36	EST	Gerli Liinamäe	1322	2010/2011 season (100%)	237	108	97	164	0
36	EST	Gerli Liinamäe	1322	2009/2010 season (70%)	0	0	0	0	0
37	GBR	Jenna McCorkell	1305	2011/2012 season (100%)	305	0	0	182	164
37	GBR	Jenna McCorkell	1305	2010/2011 season (100%)	214	0	0	164	0
37	GBR	Jenna McCorkell	1305	2009/2010 season (70%)	213	134	0	142	115
38	RUS	Polina Agafonova	1264	2011/2012 season (100%)	0	203	203	250	0
38	RUS	Polina Agafonova	1264	2010/2011 season (100%)	0	182	133	0	0
38	RUS	Polina Agafonova	1264	2009/2010 season (70%)	284	142	104	0	0
39	FIN	Laura Lepistö	1248	2011/2012 season (100%)	0	0	0	0	0
39	FIN	Laura Lepistö	1248	2010/2011 season (100%)	0	0	0	0	0
39	FIN	Laura Lepistö	1248	2009/2010 season (70%)	680	227	183	158	0
40	CHN	Kexin Zhang	1226	2011/2012 season (100%)	638	292	0	0	0
40	CHN	Kexin Zhang	1226	2010/2011 season (100%)	0	203	0	0	0
40	CHN	Kexin Zhang	1226	2009/2010 season (70%)	0	93	0	0	0
41	JPN	Yuki Nishino	1216	2011/2012 season (100%)	0	182	164	225	0
41	JPN	Yuki Nishino	1216	2010/2011 season (100%)	157	203	133	0	0
41	JPN	Yuki Nishino	1216	2009/2010 season (70%)	0	158	104	127	0
42	SLO	Patricia Glešcic	1205	2011/2012 season (100%)	93	0	0	250	164
42	SLO	Patricia Glešcic	1205	2010/2011 season (100%)	68	148	0	203	203
42	SLO	Patricia Glešcic	1205	2009/2010 season (70%)	0	76	0	0	0
43	CHN	Bingwa Geng	1165	2011/2012 season (100%)	293	191	0	182	0
43	CHN	Bingwa Geng	1165	2010/2011 season (100%)	237	262	0	0	0
43	CHN	Bingwa Geng	1165	2009/2010 season (70%)	0	0	0	0	0
44	RUS	Polina Korobeynikova	1121	2011/2012 season (100%)	612	284	225	0	0
44	RUS	Polina Korobeynikova	1121	2010/2011 season (100%)	0	0	0	0	0
44	RUS	Polina Korobeynikova	1121	2009/2010 season (70%)	0	0	0	0	0
45	CAN	Myriane Samson	1105	2011/2012 season (100%)	0	0	0	0	0
45	CAN	Myriane Samson	1105	2010/2011 season (100%)	293	213	191	0	0
45	CAN	Myriane Samson	1105	2009/2010 season (70%)	281	0	0	127	0
46	RUS	Yulia Lipnitskaya	1100	2011/2012 season (100%)	500	350	250	0	0
46	RUS	Yulia Lipnitskaya	1100	2010/2011 season (100%)	0	0	0	0	0
46	RUS	Yulia Lipnitskaya	1100	2009/2010 season (70%)	0	0	0	0	0
47	FRA	Lena Marrocco	1083	2011/2012 season (100%)	0	0	0	203	182
47	FRA	Lena Marrocco	1083	2010/2011 season (100%)	0	0	0	250	250
47	FRA	Lena Marrocco	1083	2009/2010 season (70%)	122	76	0	175	0
48	BEL	Ira Vannut	1052	2011/2012 season (100%)	0	0	0	0	0
48	BEL	Ira Vannut	1052	2010/2011 season (100%)	446	203	182	182	0
48	BEL	Ira Vannut	1052	2009/2010 season (70%)	39	0	0	0	0
49	SWE	Isabelle Olsson	1024	2011/2012 season (100%)	0	120	108	203	203
49	SWE	Isabelle Olsson	1024	2010/2011 season (100%)	44	164	148	0	0
49	SWE	Isabelle Olsson	1024	2009/2010 season (70%)	0	142	76	0	0
50	SVK	Monika Simancikova	996	2011/2012 season (100%)	214	108	97	182	0
50	SVK	Monika Simancikova	996	2010/2011 season (100%)	83	164	148	0	0
50	SVK	Monika Simancikova	996	2009/2010 season (70%)	0	93	68	0	0
51	USA	Amanda Dobbs	970	2011/2012 season (100%)	0	0	0	0	0
51	USA	Amanda Dobbs	970	2010/2011 season (100%)	0	236	0	164	0
51	USA	Amanda Dobbs	970	2009/2010 season (70%)	428	0	0	142	0
52	FIN	Juulia Turkkila	942	2011/2012 season (100%)	200	0	0	250	0
52	FIN	Juulia Turkkila	942	2010/2011 season (100%)	192	97	0	203	0
52	FIN	Juulia Turkkila	942	2009/2010 season (70%)	0	0	0	0	0
53	RUS	Sofia Biryukova	936	2011/2012 season (100%)	0	292	0	250	0
53	RUS	Sofia Biryukova	936	2010/2011 season (100%)	0	236	0	0	0
53	RUS	Sofia Biryukova	936	2009/2010 season (70%)	0	158	0	0	0
54	USA	Kiri Baga	925	2011/2012 season (100%)	0	0	0	0	0
54	USA	Kiri Baga	925	2010/2011 season (100%)	0	225	164	0	0
54	USA	Kiri Baga	925	2009/2010 season (70%)	186	175	175	0	0
55	JPN	Shion Kokubun	906	2011/2012 season (100%)	0	0	0	182	182
55	JPN	Shion Kokubun	906	2010/2011 season (100%)	0	203	164	0	0
55	JPN	Shion Kokubun	906	2009/2010 season (70%)	0	0	0	175	0
56	USA	Vanessa Lam	871	2011/2012 season (100%)	141	250	230	0	0
56	USA	Vanessa Lam	871	2010/2011 season (100%)	0	250	0	0	0
56	USA	Vanessa Lam	871	2009/2010 season (70%)	0	0	0	0	0
57	AUT	Kerstin Frank	859	2011/2012 season (100%)	146	0	0	164	164
57	AUT	Kerstin Frank	859	2010/2011 season (100%)	0	0	0	203	182
57	AUT	Kerstin Frank	859	2009/2010 season (70%)	0	0	0	158	158
58	FIN	Beata Papp	838	2011/2012 season (100%)	0	133	97	182	182
58	FIN	Beata Papp	838	2010/2011 season (100%)	0	0	0	164	0
58	FIN	Beata Papp	838	2009/2010 season (70%)	80	0	0	0	0
59	FRA	Lenaelle Gilleron-Gorry	801	2011/2012 season (100%)	0	120	120	225	203
59	FRA	Lenaelle Gilleron-Gorry	801	2010/2011 season (100%)	0	133	0	0	0
59	FRA	Lenaelle Gilleron-Gorry	801	2009/2010 season (70%)	0	0	0	0	0
60	JPN	Satoko Miyahara	754	2011/2012 season (100%)	365	225	164	0	0
60	JPN	Satoko Miyahara	754	2010/2011 season (100%)	0	0	0	0	0
60	JPN	Satoko Miyahara	754	2009/2010 season (70%)	0	0	0	0	0
61	RUS	Anna Ovcharova	752	2011/2012 season (100%)	0	0	0	203	0
61	RUS	Anna Ovcharova	752	2010/2011 season (100%)	0	0	0	0	0
61	RUS	Anna Ovcharova	752	2009/2010 season (70%)	230	161	158	0	0
62	KOR	Min-Jeong Kwak	749	2011/2012 season (100%)	325	0	0	0	0
62	KOR	Min-Jeong Kwak	749	2010/2011 season (100%)	402	0	0	0	0
62	KOR	Min-Jeong Kwak	749	2009/2010 season (70%)	347	0	0	0	0
63	CAN	Kate Charbonneau	746	2011/2012 season (100%)	0	164	133	0	0
63	CAN	Kate Charbonneau	746	2010/2011 season (100%)	0	0	0	0	0
63	CAN	Kate Charbonneau	746	2009/2010 season (70%)	207	158	84	0	0
63	SWE	Linnea Mellgren	746	2011/2012 season (100%)	0	0	0	203	0
63	SWE	Linnea Mellgren	746	2010/2011 season (100%)	0	0	0	225	203
63	SWE	Linnea Mellgren	746	2009/2010 season (70%)	0	0	0	115	115
65	JPN	Yukiko Fujisawa	717	2011/2012 season (100%)	0	148	0	0	0
65	JPN	Yukiko Fujisawa	717	2010/2011 season (100%)	0	164	120	0	0
65	JPN	Yukiko Fujisawa	717	2009/2010 season (70%)	0	127	0	158	0
66	SLO	Dasa Grm	709	2011/2012 season (100%)	0	0	0	250	164
66	SLO	Dasa Grm	709	2010/2011 season (100%)	113	0	0	182	0
66	SLO	Dasa Grm	709	2009/2010 season (70%)	0	0	0	0	0
67	USA	Gracie Gold	700	2011/2012 season (100%)	450	250	0	0	0
67	USA	Gracie Gold	700	2010/2011 season (100%)	0	0	0	0	0
67	USA	Gracie Gold	700	2009/2010 season (70%)	0	0	0	0	0
68	PUR	Victoria Muniz	699	2011/2012 season (100%)	264	0	0	0	0
68	PUR	Victoria Muniz	699	2010/2011 season (100%)	156	0	0	164	0
68	PUR	Victoria Muniz	699	2009/2010 season (70%)	0	0	0	115	0
69	BEL	Isabelle Pieman	653	2011/2012 season (100%)	126	0	0	203	0
69	BEL	Isabelle Pieman	653	2010/2011 season (100%)	0	0	0	182	0
69	BEL	Isabelle Pieman	653	2009/2010 season (70%)	0	0	0	142	0
70	JPN	Shoko Ishikawa	617	2011/2012 season (100%)	0	0	0	225	0
70	JPN	Shoko Ishikawa	617	2010/2011 season (100%)	0	0	0	250	0
70	JPN	Shoko Ishikawa	617	2009/2010 season (70%)	0	0	0	142	0
71	USA	Yasmin Siraj	614	2011/2012 season (100%)	0	164	0	0	0
71	USA	Yasmin Siraj	614	2010/2011 season (100%)	0	225	225	0	0
71	USA	Yasmin Siraj	614	2009/2010 season (70%)	0	0	0	0	0
72	KOR	Hae-Jin Kim	606	2011/2012 season (100%)	239	203	164	0	0
72	KOR	Hae-Jin Kim	606	2010/2011 season (100%)	0	0	0	0	0
72	KOR	Hae-Jin Kim	606	2009/2010 season (70%)	0	0	0	0	0
73	CHN	Qiuying Zhu	598	2011/2012 season (100%)	173	0	0	0	0
73	CHN	Qiuying Zhu	598	2010/2011 season (100%)	214	0	0	0	0
73	CHN	Qiuying Zhu	598	2009/2010 season (70%)	53	127	84	0	0
74	USA	Samantha Cesario	588	2011/2012 season (100%)	0	203	203	0	0
74	USA	Samantha Cesario	588	2010/2011 season (100%)	0	182	0	0	0
74	USA	Samantha Cesario	588	2009/2010 season (70%)	0	0	0	0	0
75	ITA	Alice Garlisi	583	2011/2012 season (100%)	0	0	0	0	0
75	ITA	Alice Garlisi	583	2010/2011 season (100%)	141	133	0	182	0
75	ITA	Alice Garlisi	583	2009/2010 season (70%)	0	127	0	0	0
76	AUS	Cheltzie Lee	573	2011/2012 season (100%)	0	0	0	0	0
76	AUS	Cheltzie Lee	573	2010/2011 season (100%)	325	0	0	0	0
76	AUS	Cheltzie Lee	573	2009/2010 season (70%)	155	93	0	0	0
77	RUS	Rosa Sheveleva	570	2011/2012 season (100%)	0	0	0	0	0
77	RUS	Rosa Sheveleva	570	2010/2011 season (100%)	0	203	148	0	0
77	RUS	Rosa Sheveleva	570	2009/2010 season (70%)	0	115	104	0	0
78	JPN	Kako Tomotaki	561	2011/2012 season (100%)	0	133	0	203	0
78	JPN	Kako Tomotaki	561	2010/2011 season (100%)	0	0	0	225	0
78	JPN	Kako Tomotaki	561	2009/2010 season (70%)	0	0	0	0	0
79	JPN	Kana Muramoto	555	2011/2012 season (100%)	0	0	0	203	0
79	JPN	Kana Muramoto	555	2010/2011 season (100%)	0	0	0	225	0
79	JPN	Kana Muramoto	555	2009/2010 season (70%)	0	0	0	127	0
79	ITA	Roberta Rodeghiero	555	2011/2012 season (100%)	0	0	0	225	0
79	ITA	Roberta Rodeghiero	555	2010/2011 season (100%)	0	0	0	203	0
79	ITA	Roberta Rodeghiero	555	2009/2010 season (70%)	0	0	0	127	0
81	USA	Courtney Hicks	545	2011/2012 season (100%)	0	250	0	0	0
81	USA	Courtney Hicks	545	2010/2011 season (100%)	295	0	0	0	0
81	USA	Courtney Hicks	545	2009/2010 season (70%)	0	0	0	0	0
82	JPN	Fumie Suguri	544	2011/2012 season (100%)	0	0	0	0	0
82	JPN	Fumie Suguri	544	2010/2011 season (100%)	0	191	0	0	0
82	JPN	Fumie Suguri	544	2009/2010 season (70%)	0	204	149	0	0
83	RUS	Kristina Zaseeva	540	2011/2012 season (100%)	0	133	0	225	182
83	RUS	Kristina Zaseeva	540	2010/2011 season (100%)	0	0	0	0	0
83	RUS	Kristina Zaseeva	540	2009/2010 season (70%)	0	0	0	0	0
84	ITA	Francesca Rio	538	2011/2012 season (100%)	83	0	0	225	182
84	ITA	Francesca Rio	538	2010/2011 season (100%)	0	0	0	0	0
84	ITA	Francesca Rio	538	2009/2010 season (70%)	48	0	0	0	0
85	CAN	Alexandra Najarro	535	2011/2012 season (100%)	237	0	0	0	0
85	CAN	Alexandra Najarro	535	2010/2011 season (100%)	0	133	97	0	0
85	CAN	Alexandra Najarro	535	2009/2010 season (70%)	0	68	0	0	0
86	USA	Kristiene Gong	534	2011/2012 season (100%)	0	0	0	0	0
86	USA	Kristiene Gong	534	2010/2011 season (100%)	0	225	182	0	0
86	USA	Kristiene Gong	534	2009/2010 season (70%)	0	127	0	0	0
87	JPN	Miu Sato	521	2011/2012 season (100%)	157	182	182	0	0
87	JPN	Miu Sato	521	2010/2011 season (100%)	0	0	0	0	0
87	JPN	Miu Sato	521	2009/2010 season (70%)	0	0	0	0	0
88	FRA	Anais Ventard	508	2011/2012 season (100%)	0	120	120	0	0
88	FRA	Anais Ventard	508	2010/2011 season (100%)	0	148	120	0	0
88	FRA	Anais Ventard	508	2009/2010 season (70%)	0	0	0	0	0
89	SUI	Romy Bühler	503	2011/2012 season (100%)	118	0	0	0	0
89	SUI	Romy Bühler	503	2010/2011 season (100%)	173	97	0	0	0
89	SUI	Romy Bühler	503	2009/2010 season (70%)	99	0	0	115	0
90	GER	Katharina Häcker	492	2011/2012 season (100%)	0	0	0	0	0
90	GER	Katharina Häcker	492	2010/2011 season (100%)	0	0	0	250	0
90	GER	Katharina Häcker	492	2009/2010 season (70%)	0	0	0	127	115
91	TUR	Sıla Saygı	486	2011/2012 season (100%)	0	0	0	0	0
91	TUR	Sıla Saygı	486	2010/2011 season (100%)	0	0	0	225	0
91	TUR	Sıla Saygı	486	2009/2010 season (70%)	89	104	68	0	0
92	CHN	Yan Liu	476	2011/2012 season (100%)	0	0	0	0	0
92	CHN	Yan Liu	476	2010/2011 season (100%)	0	0	0	0	0
92	CHN	Yan Liu	476	2009/2010 season (70%)	185	149	0	142	0
93	AUT	Miriam Ziegler	472	2011/2012 season (100%)	0	0	0	0	0
93	AUT	Miriam Ziegler	472	2010/2011 season (100%)	0	0	0	203	0
93	AUT	Miriam Ziegler	472	2009/2010 season (70%)	0	0	0	142	127
94	GER	Nathalie Weinzierl	457	2011/2012 season (100%)	92	0	0	250	0
94	GER	Nathalie Weinzierl	457	2010/2011 season (100%)	0	0	0	0	0
94	GER	Nathalie Weinzierl	457	2009/2010 season (70%)	0	0	0	115	0
95	USA	Alexe Gilles	436	2011/2012 season (100%)	0	0	0	0	0
95	USA	Alexe Gilles	436	2010/2011 season (100%)	0	0	0	0	0
95	USA	Alexe Gilles	436	2009/2010 season (70%)	253	183	0	0	0
96	USA	Kristine Musademba	434	2011/2012 season (100%)	0	0	0	0	0
96	USA	Kristine Musademba	434	2010/2011 season (100%)	0	191	0	0	0
96	USA	Kristine Musademba	434	2009/2010 season (70%)	0	175	68	0	0
97	NOR	Anne Line Gjersem	432	2011/2012 season (100%)	0	0	0	0	0
97	NOR	Anne Line Gjersem	432	2010/2011 season (100%)	0	0	0	250	182
97	NOR	Anne Line Gjersem	432	2009/2010 season (70%)	0	0	0	0	0
98	ITA	Carol Bressanutti	411	2011/2012 season (100%)	83	0	0	0	0
98	ITA	Carol Bressanutti	411	2010/2011 season (100%)	0	0	0	164	164
98	ITA	Carol Bressanutti	411	2009/2010 season (70%)	0	0	0	0	0
99	JPN	Roanna Sari Oshikawa	399	2011/2012 season (100%)	0	0	0	0	0
99	JPN	Roanna Sari Oshikawa	399	2010/2011 season (100%)	0	164	108	0	0
99	JPN	Roanna Sari Oshikawa	399	2009/2010 season (70%)	0	0	0	127	0
99	CAN	Kaetlyn Osmond	399	2011/2012 season (100%)	194	0	0	0	0
99	CAN	Kaetlyn Osmond	399	2010/2011 season (100%)	0	108	97	0	0
99	CAN	Kaetlyn Osmond	399	2009/2010 season (70%)	0	0	0	0	0
101	LAT	Alina Fjodorova	396	2011/2012 season (100%)	173	108	0	0	0
101	LAT	Alina Fjodorova	396	2010/2011 season (100%)	0	0	0	0	0
101	LAT	Alina Fjodorova	396	2009/2010 season (70%)	31	84	0	0	0
102	KOR	Yea-Ji Yun	390	2011/2012 season (100%)	126	0	0	0	0
102	KOR	Yea-Ji Yun	390	2010/2011 season (100%)	264	0	0	0	0
102	KOR	Yea-Ji Yun	390	2009/2010 season (70%)	0	0	0	0	0
103	USA	Joelle Forte	373	2011/2012 season (100%)	0	191	0	0	0
103	USA	Joelle Forte	373	2010/2011 season (100%)	0	0	0	182	0
103	USA	Joelle Forte	373	2009/2010 season (70%)	0	0	0	0	0
103	JPN	Haruna Suzuki	373	2011/2012 season (100%)	0	148	0	225	0
103	JPN	Haruna Suzuki	373	2010/2011 season (100%)	0	0	0	0	0
103	JPN	Haruna Suzuki	373	2009/2010 season (70%)	0	0	0	0	0
105	JPN	Miyabi Oba	372	2011/2012 season (100%)	0	133	0	0	0
105	JPN	Miyabi Oba	372	2010/2011 season (100%)	239	0	0	0	0
105	JPN	Miyabi Oba	372	2009/2010 season (70%)	0	0	0	0	0
106	RUS	Ekaterina Kozireva	366	2011/2012 season (100%)	0	0	0	0	0
106	RUS	Ekaterina Kozireva	366	2010/2011 season (100%)	0	0	0	0	0
106	RUS	Ekaterina Kozireva	366	2009/2010 season (70%)	0	115	93	158	0
107	BEL	Kaat Van Daele	364	2011/2012 season (100%)	0	0	0	182	182
107	BEL	Kaat Van Daele	364	2010/2011 season (100%)	0	0	0	0	0
107	BEL	Kaat Van Daele	364	2009/2010 season (70%)	0	0	0	0	0
108	RUS	Anna Shershak	358	2011/2012 season (100%)	0	225	133	0	0
108	RUS	Anna Shershak	358	2010/2011 season (100%)	0	0	0	0	0
108	RUS	Anna Shershak	358	2009/2010 season (70%)	0	0	0	0	0
109	TPE	Melinda Wang	354	2011/2012 season (100%)	214	0	0	0	0
109	TPE	Melinda Wang	354	2010/2011 season (100%)	140	0	0	0	0
109	TPE	Melinda Wang	354	2009/2010 season (70%)	88	0	0	0	0
110	ITA	Amelia Schwienbacher	346	2011/2012 season (100%)	0	0	0	0	0
110	ITA	Amelia Schwienbacher	346	2010/2011 season (100%)	0	0	0	182	164
110	ITA	Amelia Schwienbacher	346	2009/2010 season (70%)	0	0	0	0	0
111	JPN	Ayumi Goto	345	2011/2012 season (100%)	0	0	0	0	0
111	JPN	Ayumi Goto	345	2010/2011 season (100%)	0	120	0	225	0
111	JPN	Ayumi Goto	345	2009/2010 season (70%)	0	0	0	0	0
112	KOR	Chae-Hwa Kim	339	2011/2012 season (100%)	0	0	0	0	0
112	KOR	Chae-Hwa Kim	339	2010/2011 season (100%)	173	0	0	0	0
112	KOR	Chae-Hwa Kim	339	2009/2010 season (70%)	166	0	0	0	0
113	JPN	Satsuki Muramoto	333	2011/2012 season (100%)	0	0	0	0	0
113	JPN	Satsuki Muramoto	333	2010/2011 season (100%)	0	0	0	0	0
113	JPN	Satsuki Muramoto	333	2009/2010 season (70%)	0	0	0	175	158
114	RUS	Maria Artemieva	330	2011/2012 season (100%)	0	0	0	203	0
114	RUS	Maria Artemieva	330	2010/2011 season (100%)	0	0	0	0	0
114	RUS	Maria Artemieva	330	2009/2010 season (70%)	0	127	0	0	0
114	KOR	So Youn Park	330	2011/2012 season (100%)	0	182	148	0	0
114	KOR	So Youn Park	330	2010/2011 season (100%)	0	0	0	0	0
114	KOR	So Youn Park	330	2009/2010 season (70%)	0	0	0	0	0
116	CHN	Ziquan Zhao	322	2011/2012 season (100%)	174	148	0	0	0
116	CHN	Ziquan Zhao	322	2010/2011 season (100%)	0	0	0	0	0
116	CHN	Ziquan Zhao	322	2009/2010 season (70%)	0	0	0	0	0
117	LUX	Fleur Maxwell	317	2011/2012 season (100%)	0	0	0	225	0
117	LUX	Fleur Maxwell	317	2010/2011 season (100%)	92	0	0	0	0
117	LUX	Fleur Maxwell	317	2009/2010 season (70%)	0	0	0	0	0
117	GER	Julia Pfrengle	317	2011/2012 season (100%)	0	0	0	0	0
117	GER	Julia Pfrengle	317	2010/2011 season (100%)	0	97	0	0	0
117	GER	Julia Pfrengle	317	2009/2010 season (70%)	136	84	0	0	0
119	USA	Angela Maxwell	316	2011/2012 season (100%)	0	0	0	0	0
119	USA	Angela Maxwell	316	2010/2011 season (100%)	0	0	0	0	0
119	USA	Angela Maxwell	316	2009/2010 season (70%)	0	158	158	0	0
120	RSA	Lejeanne Marais	313	2011/2012 season (100%)	92	0	0	0	0
120	RSA	Lejeanne Marais	313	2010/2011 season (100%)	192	0	0	0	0
120	RSA	Lejeanne Marais	313	2009/2010 season (70%)	121	0	0	0	0
121	USA	Ashley Cain	312	2011/2012 season (100%)	0	164	148	0	0
121	USA	Ashley Cain	312	2010/2011 season (100%)	0	0	0	0	0
121	USA	Ashley Cain	312	2009/2010 season (70%)	0	0	0	0	0
122	FIN	Alisa Mikonsaari	309	2011/2012 season (100%)	106	0	0	203	0
122	FIN	Alisa Mikonsaari	309	2010/2011 season (100%)	0	0	0	0	0
122	FIN	Alisa Mikonsaari	309	2009/2010 season (70%)	0	0	0	0	0
123	KOR	Ho Jung Lee	305	2011/2012 season (100%)	0	0	0	0	0
123	KOR	Ho Jung Lee	305	2010/2011 season (100%)	49	148	108	0	0
123	KOR	Ho Jung Lee	305	2009/2010 season (70%)	0	0	0	0	0
124	AUT	Belinda Schönberger	301	2011/2012 season (100%)	0	0	0	0	0
124	AUT	Belinda Schönberger	301	2010/2011 season (100%)	0	0	0	225	0
124	AUT	Belinda Schönberger	301	2009/2010 season (70%)	0	76	0	0	0
125	RUS	Katarina Gerboldt	300	2011/2012 season (100%)	0	0	0	0	0
125	RUS	Katarina Gerboldt	300	2010/2011 season (100%)	0	0	0	0	0
125	RUS	Katarina Gerboldt	300	2009/2010 season (70%)	0	0	0	158	142
126	FIN	Minna Parviainen	291	2011/2012 season (100%)	0	0	0	164	0
126	FIN	Minna Parviainen	291	2010/2011 season (100%)	0	0	0	0	0
126	FIN	Minna Parviainen	291	2009/2010 season (70%)	0	0	0	127	0
127	EST	Jasmine Alexandra Costa	279	2011/2012 season (100%)	0	0	0	164	0
127	EST	Jasmine Alexandra Costa	279	2010/2011 season (100%)	0	0	0	0	0
127	EST	Jasmine Alexandra Costa	279	2009/2010 season (70%)	0	115	0	0	0
128	AUS	Brooklee Han	278	2011/2012 season (100%)	0	120	0	0	0
128	AUS	Brooklee Han	278	2010/2011 season (100%)	61	97	0	0	0
128	AUS	Brooklee Han	278	2009/2010 season (70%)	0	0	0	0	0
129	AUT	Victoria Huebler	277	2011/2012 season (100%)	0	108	0	0	0
129	AUT	Victoria Huebler	277	2010/2011 season (100%)	93	0	0	0	0
129	AUT	Victoria Huebler	277	2009/2010 season (70%)	0	76	0	0	0
130	KOR	Na-Young Kim	276	2011/2012 season (100%)	0	0	0	0	0
130	KOR	Na-Young Kim	276	2010/2011 season (100%)	0	0	0	0	0
130	KOR	Na-Young Kim	276	2009/2010 season (70%)	134	0	0	142	0
131	USA	Ellie Kawamura	269	2011/2012 season (100%)	0	0	0	0	0
131	USA	Ellie Kawamura	269	2010/2011 season (100%)	0	0	0	0	0
131	USA	Ellie Kawamura	269	2009/2010 season (70%)	0	142	127	0	0
131	AUT	Sabrina Schulz	269	2011/2012 season (100%)	44	0	0	225	0
131	AUT	Sabrina Schulz	269	2010/2011 season (100%)	0	0	0	0	0
131	AUT	Sabrina Schulz	269	2009/2010 season (70%)	0	0	0	0	0
133	THA	Mimi Tanasorn Chindasook	266	2011/2012 season (100%)	140	0	0	0	0
133	THA	Mimi Tanasorn Chindasook	266	2010/2011 season (100%)	126	0	0	0	0
133	THA	Mimi Tanasorn Chindasook	266	2009/2010 season (70%)	0	0	0	0	0
133	KOR	Chae-Yeon Suhr	266	2011/2012 season (100%)	102	0	0	164	0
133	KOR	Chae-Yeon Suhr	266	2010/2011 season (100%)	0	0	0	0	0
133	KOR	Chae-Yeon Suhr	266	2009/2010 season (70%)	0	0	0	0	0
135	SUI	Tina Stuerzinger	254	2011/2012 season (100%)	49	97	0	0	0
135	SUI	Tina Stuerzinger	254	2010/2011 season (100%)	0	108	0	0	0
135	SUI	Tina Stuerzinger	254	2009/2010 season (70%)	0	0	0	0	0
136	EST	Svetlana Issakova	250	2011/2012 season (100%)	0	0	0	0	0
136	EST	Svetlana Issakova	250	2010/2011 season (100%)	140	0	0	0	0
136	EST	Svetlana Issakova	250	2009/2010 season (70%)	110	0	0	0	0
137	ISR	Tamar Katz	242	2011/2012 season (100%)	0	0	0	0	0
137	ISR	Tamar Katz	242	2010/2011 season (100%)	0	0	0	0	0
137	ISR	Tamar Katz	242	2009/2010 season (70%)	0	0	0	127	115
138	JPN	Karen Kemanai	240	2011/2012 season (100%)	0	0	0	0	0
138	JPN	Karen Kemanai	240	2010/2011 season (100%)	0	120	120	0	0
138	JPN	Karen Kemanai	240	2009/2010 season (70%)	0	0	0	0	0
139	DEN	Karina Johnson	230	2011/2012 season (100%)	74	0	0	0	0
139	DEN	Karina Johnson	230	2010/2011 season (100%)	156	0	0	0	0
139	DEN	Karina Johnson	230	2009/2010 season (70%)	72	0	0	0	0
140	FIN	Timila Shrestha	228	2011/2012 season (100%)	0	0	0	0	0
140	FIN	Timila Shrestha	228	2010/2011 season (100%)	0	120	108	0	0
140	FIN	Timila Shrestha	228	2009/2010 season (70%)	0	0	0	0	0
141	JPN	Yuka Kouno	225	2011/2012 season (100%)	0	0	0	0	0
141	JPN	Yuka Kouno	225	2010/2011 season (100%)	0	0	0	225	0
141	JPN	Yuka Kouno	225	2009/2010 season (70%)	0	0	0	0	0
142	SWE	Angelica Olsson	223	2011/2012 season (100%)	0	0	0	0	0
142	SWE	Angelica Olsson	223	2010/2011 season (100%)	0	0	0	0	0
142	SWE	Angelica Olsson	223	2009/2010 season (70%)	65	0	0	158	0
143	GER	Isabel Drescher	209	2011/2012 season (100%)	0	0	0	0	0
143	GER	Isabel Drescher	209	2010/2011 season (100%)	75	0	0	0	0
143	GER	Isabel Drescher	209	2009/2010 season (70%)	58	76	0	0	0
144	UZB	Anastasia Gimazetdinova	205	2011/2012 season (100%)	0	0	0	0	0
144	UZB	Anastasia Gimazetdinova	205	2010/2011 season (100%)	0	0	0	0	0
144	UZB	Anastasia Gimazetdinova	205	2009/2010 season (70%)	205	0	0	0	0
145	USA	Melissa Bulanhagui	203	2011/2012 season (100%)	0	0	0	0	0
145	USA	Melissa Bulanhagui	203	2010/2011 season (100%)	0	0	0	203	0
145	USA	Melissa Bulanhagui	203	2009/2010 season (70%)	0	0	0	0	0
145	SLO	Nika Ceric	203	2011/2012 season (100%)	0	0	0	203	0
145	SLO	Nika Ceric	203	2010/2011 season (100%)	0	0	0	0	0
145	SLO	Nika Ceric	203	2009/2010 season (70%)	0	0	0	0	0
145	USA	Hannah Miller	203	2011/2012 season (100%)	0	203	0	0	0
145	USA	Hannah Miller	203	2010/2011 season (100%)	0	0	0	0	0
145	USA	Hannah Miller	203	2009/2010 season (70%)	0	0	0	0	0
145	SLO	Teodora Postic	203	2011/2012 season (100%)	0	0	0	0	0
145	SLO	Teodora Postic	203	2010/2011 season (100%)	0	0	0	0	0
145	SLO	Teodora Postic	203	2009/2010 season (70%)	88	0	0	115	0
149	SVK	Ivana Reitmayerova	202	2011/2012 season (100%)	0	0	0	0	0
149	SVK	Ivana Reitmayerova	202	2010/2011 season (100%)	0	0	0	0	0
149	SVK	Ivana Reitmayerova	202	2009/2010 season (70%)	134	68	0	0	0
150	TPE	Crystal Kiang	200	2011/2012 season (100%)	83	0	0	0	0
150	TPE	Crystal Kiang	200	2010/2011 season (100%)	102	0	0	0	0
150	TPE	Crystal Kiang	200	2009/2010 season (70%)	98	0	0	0	0
151	THA	Melanie Swang	196	2011/2012 season (100%)	113	0	0	0	0
151	THA	Melanie Swang	196	2010/2011 season (100%)	83	0	0	0	0
151	THA	Melanie Swang	196	2009/2010 season (70%)	0	0	0	0	0
152	THA	Sandra Khopon	192	2011/2012 season (100%)	192	0	0	0	0
152	THA	Sandra Khopon	192	2010/2011 season (100%)	0	0	0	0	0
152	THA	Sandra Khopon	192	2009/2010 season (70%)	0	0	0	0	0
153	SWE	Malin Magnusson-Ruf	188	2011/2012 season (100%)	0	0	0	0	0
153	SWE	Malin Magnusson-Ruf	188	2010/2011 season (100%)	0	0	0	0	0
153	SWE	Malin Magnusson-Ruf	188	2009/2010 season (70%)	0	104	84	0	0
154	GER	Shira Willner	186	2011/2012 season (100%)	0	0	0	0	0
154	GER	Shira Willner	186	2010/2011 season (100%)	0	0	0	0	0
154	GER	Shira Willner	186	2009/2010 season (70%)	0	93	93	0	0
155	SUI	Bettina Heim	182	2011/2012 season (100%)	0	0	0	0	0
155	SUI	Bettina Heim	182	2010/2011 season (100%)	0	0	0	182	0
155	SUI	Bettina Heim	182	2009/2010 season (70%)	0	0	0	0	0
155	POL	Anna Jurkiewicz	182	2011/2012 season (100%)	0	0	0	0	0
155	POL	Anna Jurkiewicz	182	2010/2011 season (100%)	0	0	0	182	0
155	POL	Anna Jurkiewicz	182	2009/2010 season (70%)	0	0	0	0	0
155	CRO	Mirna Libric	182	2011/2012 season (100%)	0	0	0	182	0
155	CRO	Mirna Libric	182	2010/2011 season (100%)	0	0	0	0	0
155	CRO	Mirna Libric	182	2009/2010 season (70%)	0	0	0	0	0
155	USA	Angela Wang	182	2011/2012 season (100%)	0	0	0	0	0
155	USA	Angela Wang	182	2010/2011 season (100%)	0	182	0	0	0
155	USA	Angela Wang	182	2009/2010 season (70%)	0	0	0	0	0
159	JPN	Mutsumi Takayama	175	2011/2012 season (100%)	0	0	0	0	0
159	JPN	Mutsumi Takayama	175	2010/2011 season (100%)	0	0	0	0	0
159	JPN	Mutsumi Takayama	175	2009/2010 season (70%)	0	0	0	175	0
160	RUS	Oksana Gozeva	166	2011/2012 season (100%)	0	0	0	0	0
160	RUS	Oksana Gozeva	166	2010/2011 season (100%)	0	0	0	0	0
160	RUS	Oksana Gozeva	166	2009/2010 season (70%)	166	0	0	0	0
161	SUI	Virginie Clerc	164	2011/2012 season (100%)	0	0	0	0	0
161	SUI	Virginie Clerc	164	2010/2011 season (100%)	0	0	0	164	0
161	SUI	Virginie Clerc	164	2009/2010 season (70%)	0	0	0	0	0
161	FRA	Candice Didier	164	2011/2012 season (100%)	0	0	0	0	0
161	FRA	Candice Didier	164	2010/2011 season (100%)	0	0	0	164	0
161	FRA	Candice Didier	164	2009/2010 season (70%)	0	0	0	0	0
161	USA	Nina Jiang	164	2011/2012 season (100%)	0	0	0	0	0
161	USA	Nina Jiang	164	2010/2011 season (100%)	0	164	0	0	0
161	USA	Nina Jiang	164	2009/2010 season (70%)	0	0	0	0	0
161	USA	Katarina Kulgeyko	164	2011/2012 season (100%)	0	164	0	0	0
161	USA	Katarina Kulgeyko	164	2010/2011 season (100%)	0	0	0	0	0
161	USA	Katarina Kulgeyko	164	2009/2010 season (70%)	0	0	0	0	0
161	NOR	Anine Rabe	164	2011/2012 season (100%)	0	0	0	164	0
161	NOR	Anine Rabe	164	2010/2011 season (100%)	0	0	0	0	0
161	NOR	Anine Rabe	164	2009/2010 season (70%)	0	0	0	0	0
161	NED	Larissa Van Der Linden	164	2011/2012 season (100%)	0	0	0	164	0
161	NED	Larissa Van Der Linden	164	2010/2011 season (100%)	0	0	0	0	0
161	NED	Larissa Van Der Linden	164	2009/2010 season (70%)	0	0	0	0	0
161	GER	Katharina Zientek	164	2011/2012 season (100%)	0	0	0	164	0
161	GER	Katharina Zientek	164	2010/2011 season (100%)	0	0	0	0	0
161	GER	Katharina Zientek	164	2009/2010 season (70%)	0	0	0	0	0
168	NED	Manouk Gijsman	158	2011/2012 season (100%)	0	0	0	0	0
168	NED	Manouk Gijsman	158	2010/2011 season (100%)	0	0	0	0	0
168	NED	Manouk Gijsman	158	2009/2010 season (70%)	74	84	0	0	0
168	JPN	Mari Suzuki	158	2011/2012 season (100%)	0	0	0	0	0
168	JPN	Mari Suzuki	158	2010/2011 season (100%)	0	0	0	0	0
168	JPN	Mari Suzuki	158	2009/2010 season (70%)	0	0	0	158	0
170	AUS	Chantelle Kerry	156	2011/2012 season (100%)	156	0	0	0	0
170	AUS	Chantelle Kerry	156	2010/2011 season (100%)	0	0	0	0	0
170	AUS	Chantelle Kerry	156	2009/2010 season (70%)	0	0	0	0	0
171	UKR	Alina Milevskaia	151	2011/2012 season (100%)	0	0	0	0	0
171	UKR	Alina Milevskaia	151	2010/2011 season (100%)	0	108	0	0	0
171	UKR	Alina Milevskaia	151	2009/2010 season (70%)	43	0	0	0	0
172	USA	Emily Hughes	149	2011/2012 season (100%)	0	0	0	0	0
172	USA	Emily Hughes	149	2010/2011 season (100%)	0	0	0	0	0
172	USA	Emily Hughes	149	2009/2010 season (70%)	0	149	0	0	0
173	USA	Lauren Dinh	148	2011/2012 season (100%)	0	148	0	0	0
173	USA	Lauren Dinh	148	2010/2011 season (100%)	0	0	0	0	0
173	USA	Lauren Dinh	148	2009/2010 season (70%)	0	0	0	0	0
173	RUS	Maria Stavitskaia	148	2011/2012 season (100%)	0	148	0	0	0
173	RUS	Maria Stavitskaia	148	2010/2011 season (100%)	0	0	0	0	0
173	RUS	Maria Stavitskaia	148	2009/2010 season (70%)	0	0	0	0	0
175	GER	Annette Dytrt	134	2011/2012 season (100%)	0	0	0	0	0
175	GER	Annette Dytrt	134	2010/2011 season (100%)	0	0	0	0	0
175	GER	Annette Dytrt	134	2009/2010 season (70%)	0	134	0	0	0
176	RUS	Nikol Gosviani	133	2011/2012 season (100%)	0	0	0	0	0
176	RUS	Nikol Gosviani	133	2010/2011 season (100%)	0	133	0	0	0
176	RUS	Nikol Gosviani	133	2009/2010 season (70%)	0	0	0	0	0
176	USA	Felicia Zhang	133	2011/2012 season (100%)	0	0	0	0	0
176	USA	Felicia Zhang	133	2010/2011 season (100%)	0	133	0	0	0
176	USA	Felicia Zhang	133	2009/2010 season (70%)	0	0	0	0	0
178	GER	Sandy Hoffmann	127	2011/2012 season (100%)	0	0	0	0	0
178	GER	Sandy Hoffmann	127	2010/2011 season (100%)	0	0	0	0	0
178	GER	Sandy Hoffmann	127	2009/2010 season (70%)	0	127	0	0	0
178	NZL	Alexandra Rout	127	2011/2012 season (100%)	0	0	0	0	0
178	NZL	Alexandra Rout	127	2010/2011 season (100%)	0	0	0	0	0
178	NZL	Alexandra Rout	127	2009/2010 season (70%)	0	0	0	127	0
180	HUN	Viktória Pavuk	126	2011/2012 season (100%)	0	0	0	0	0
180	HUN	Viktória Pavuk	126	2010/2011 season (100%)	126	0	0	0	0
180	HUN	Viktória Pavuk	126	2009/2010 season (70%)	0	0	0	0	0
181	GER	Jessica Füssinger	120	2011/2012 season (100%)	0	0	0	0	0
181	GER	Jessica Füssinger	120	2010/2011 season (100%)	0	120	0	0	0
181	GER	Jessica Füssinger	120	2009/2010 season (70%)	0	0	0	0	0
181	DEN	Anita Madsen	120	2011/2012 season (100%)	0	120	0	0	0
181	DEN	Anita Madsen	120	2010/2011 season (100%)	0	0	0	0	0
181	DEN	Anita Madsen	120	2009/2010 season (70%)	0	0	0	0	0
183	UKR	Irina Movchan	118	2011/2012 season (100%)	0	0	0	0	0
183	UKR	Irina Movchan	118	2010/2011 season (100%)	118	0	0	0	0
183	UKR	Irina Movchan	118	2009/2010 season (70%)	0	0	0	0	0
184	NZL	Morgan Figgins	115	2011/2012 season (100%)	0	0	0	0	0
184	NZL	Morgan Figgins	115	2010/2011 season (100%)	0	0	0	0	0
184	NZL	Morgan Figgins	115	2009/2010 season (70%)	0	0	0	115	0
184	USA	Taylor Firth	115	2011/2012 season (100%)	0	0	0	0	0
184	USA	Taylor Firth	115	2010/2011 season (100%)	0	0	0	0	0
184	USA	Taylor Firth	115	2009/2010 season (70%)	0	115	0	0	0
184	CAN	Vanessa Grenier	115	2011/2012 season (100%)	0	0	0	0	0
184	CAN	Vanessa Grenier	115	2010/2011 season (100%)	0	0	0	0	0
184	CAN	Vanessa Grenier	115	2009/2010 season (70%)	0	115	0	0	0
184	USA	Karen Zhou	115	2011/2012 season (100%)	0	0	0	0	0
184	USA	Karen Zhou	115	2010/2011 season (100%)	0	0	0	0	0
184	USA	Karen Zhou	115	2009/2010 season (70%)	0	115	0	0	0
188	AUS	Jaimee Nobbs	113	2011/2012 season (100%)	0	0	0	0	0
188	AUS	Jaimee Nobbs	113	2010/2011 season (100%)	113	0	0	0	0
188	AUS	Jaimee Nobbs	113	2009/2010 season (70%)	0	0	0	0	0
189	MEX	Ana Cecilia Cantu	109	2011/2012 season (100%)	0	0	0	0	0
189	MEX	Ana Cecilia Cantu	109	2010/2011 season (100%)	0	0	0	0	0
189	MEX	Ana Cecilia Cantu	109	2009/2010 season (70%)	109	0	0	0	0
190	POL	Alexandra Kamieniecki	108	2011/2012 season (100%)	0	108	0	0	0
190	POL	Alexandra Kamieniecki	108	2010/2011 season (100%)	0	0	0	0	0
190	POL	Alexandra Kamieniecki	108	2009/2010 season (70%)	0	0	0	0	0
190	CAN	Natasha Purich	108	2011/2012 season (100%)	0	108	0	0	0
190	CAN	Natasha Purich	108	2010/2011 season (100%)	0	0	0	0	0
190	CAN	Natasha Purich	108	2009/2010 season (70%)	0	0	0	0	0
190	SWE	Josefine Taljegard	108	2011/2012 season (100%)	0	108	0	0	0
190	SWE	Josefine Taljegard	108	2010/2011 season (100%)	0	0	0	0	0
190	SWE	Josefine Taljegard	108	2009/2010 season (70%)	0	0	0	0	0
193	BRA	Isadora Williams	103	2011/2012 season (100%)	103	0	0	0	0
193	BRA	Isadora Williams	103	2010/2011 season (100%)	0	0	0	0	0
193	BRA	Isadora Williams	103	2009/2010 season (70%)	0	0	0	0	0
194	SUI	Myriam Leuenberger	102	2011/2012 season (100%)	102	0	0	0	0
194	SUI	Myriam Leuenberger	102	2010/2011 season (100%)	0	0	0	0	0
194	SUI	Myriam Leuenberger	102	2009/2010 season (70%)	0	0	0	0	0
195	USA	McKinzie Daniels	97	2011/2012 season (100%)	0	97	0	0	0
195	USA	McKinzie Daniels	97	2010/2011 season (100%)	0	0	0	0	0
195	USA	McKinzie Daniels	97	2009/2010 season (70%)	0	0	0	0	0
195	RUS	Alexandra Deeva	97	2011/2012 season (100%)	0	97	0	0	0
195	RUS	Alexandra Deeva	97	2010/2011 season (100%)	0	0	0	0	0
195	RUS	Alexandra Deeva	97	2009/2010 season (70%)	0	0	0	0	0
195	FRA	Laurine Lecavelier	97	2011/2012 season (100%)	0	97	0	0	0
195	FRA	Laurine Lecavelier	97	2010/2011 season (100%)	0	0	0	0	0
195	FRA	Laurine Lecavelier	97	2009/2010 season (70%)	0	0	0	0	0
195	JPN	Saya Ueno	97	2011/2012 season (100%)	0	97	0	0	0
195	JPN	Saya Ueno	97	2010/2011 season (100%)	0	0	0	0	0
195	JPN	Saya Ueno	97	2009/2010 season (70%)	0	0	0	0	0
199	USA	Deedee Leng	93	2011/2012 season (100%)	0	0	0	0	0
199	USA	Deedee Leng	93	2010/2011 season (100%)	0	0	0	0	0
199	USA	Deedee Leng	93	2009/2010 season (70%)	0	93	0	0	0
200	PHI	Mericien Venzon	92	2011/2012 season (100%)	0	0	0	0	0
200	PHI	Mericien Venzon	92	2010/2011 season (100%)	92	0	0	0	0
200	PHI	Mericien Venzon	92	2009/2010 season (70%)	0	0	0	0	0
201	SVK	Karolina Sykorova	84	2011/2012 season (100%)	0	0	0	0	0
201	SVK	Karolina Sykorova	84	2010/2011 season (100%)	0	0	0	0	0
201	SVK	Karolina Sykorova	84	2009/2010 season (70%)	0	84	0	0	0
202	BUL	Hristina Vassileva	83	2011/2012 season (100%)	0	0	0	0	0
202	BUL	Hristina Vassileva	83	2010/2011 season (100%)	83	0	0	0	0
202	BUL	Hristina Vassileva	83	2009/2010 season (70%)	0	0	0	0	0
203	PHI	Lauren Ko	79	2011/2012 season (100%)	0	0	0	0	0
203	PHI	Lauren Ko	79	2010/2011 season (100%)	0	0	0	0	0
203	PHI	Lauren Ko	79	2009/2010 season (70%)	79	0	0	0	0
204	CAN	Rylie McCulloch-Casarsa	76	2011/2012 season (100%)	0	0	0	0	0
204	CAN	Rylie McCulloch-Casarsa	76	2010/2011 season (100%)	0	0	0	0	0
204	CAN	Rylie McCulloch-Casarsa	76	2009/2010 season (70%)	0	76	0	0	0
205	PHI	Zhaira Costiniano	74	2011/2012 season (100%)	74	0	0	0	0
205	PHI	Zhaira Costiniano	74	2010/2011 season (100%)	0	0	0	0	0
205	PHI	Zhaira Costiniano	74	2009/2010 season (70%)	0	0	0	0	0
205	SVK	Alexandra Kunova	74	2011/2012 season (100%)	0	0	0	0	0
205	SVK	Alexandra Kunova	74	2010/2011 season (100%)	74	0	0	0	0
205	SVK	Alexandra Kunova	74	2009/2010 season (70%)	0	0	0	0	0
205	TPE	Chaochih Liu	74	2011/2012 season (100%)	0	0	0	0	0
205	TPE	Chaochih Liu	74	2010/2011 season (100%)	74	0	0	0	0
205	TPE	Chaochih Liu	74	2009/2010 season (70%)	0	0	0	0	0
208	SWE	Rebecka Emanuelsson	68	2011/2012 season (100%)	0	0	0	0	0
208	SWE	Rebecka Emanuelsson	68	2010/2011 season (100%)	0	0	0	0	0
208	SWE	Rebecka Emanuelsson	68	2009/2010 season (70%)	0	68	0	0	0
209	GER	Nicole Schott	55	2011/2012 season (100%)	0	0	0	0	0
209	GER	Nicole Schott	55	2010/2011 season (100%)	55	0	0	0	0
209	GER	Nicole Schott	55	2009/2010 season (70%)	0	0	0	0	0

==== Pairs (93 couples) ====
As of 30 March 2012

Rank	Nation	Couple	Points	Season	ISU Championships or Olympics	(Junior) Grand Prix and Final		Selected International Competition	
Rank	Nation	Couple	Points	Season	Best	Best	2nd Best	Best	2nd Best
1	GER	Aliona Savchenko / Robin Szolkowy	5029	2011/2012 season (100%)	1200	800	400	0	0
1	GER	Aliona Savchenko / Robin Szolkowy	5029	2010/2011 season (100%)	1200	800	400	0	0
1	GER	Aliona Savchenko / Robin Szolkowy	5029	2009/2010 season (70%)	756	454	280	175	0
2	RUS	Tatiana Volosozhar / Maxim Trankov	4030	2011/2012 season (100%)	1080	720	400	250	250
2	RUS	Tatiana Volosozhar / Maxim Trankov	4030	2010/2011 season (100%)	1080	0	0	250	0
2	RUS	Tatiana Volosozhar / Maxim Trankov	4030	2009/2010 season (70%)	0	0	0	0	0
3	CHN	Qing Pang / Jian Tong	3751	2011/2012 season (100%)	875	0	0	0	0
3	CHN	Qing Pang / Jian Tong	3751	2010/2011 season (100%)	972	720	400	0	0
3	CHN	Qing Pang / Jian Tong	3751	2009/2010 season (70%)	840	504	280	0	0
4	RUS	Vera Bazarova / Yuri Larionov	3525	2011/2012 season (100%)	756	360	262	225	0
4	RUS	Vera Bazarova / Yuri Larionov	3525	2010/2011 season (100%)	787	525	360	250	0
4	RUS	Vera Bazarova / Yuri Larionov	3525	2009/2010 season (70%)	402	204	0	0	0
5	RUS	Yuko Kavaguti / Alexander Smirnov	3371	2011/2012 season (100%)	638	648	400	0	0
5	RUS	Yuko Kavaguti / Alexander Smirnov	3371	2010/2011 season (100%)	875	400	0	0	0
5	RUS	Yuko Kavaguti / Alexander Smirnov	3371	2009/2010 season (70%)	680	368	252	0	0
6	CHN	Wenjing Sui / Cong Han	3058	2011/2012 season (100%)	840	360	350	0	0
6	CHN	Wenjing Sui / Cong Han	3058	2010/2011 season (100%)	500	648	360	0	0
6	CHN	Wenjing Sui / Cong Han	3058	2009/2010 season (70%)	350	245	175	0	0
7	JPN	Narumi Takahashi / Mervin Tran	3031	2011/2012 season (100%)	972	472	360	0	0
7	JPN	Narumi Takahashi / Mervin Tran	3031	2010/2011 season (100%)	517	360	350	0	0
7	JPN	Narumi Takahashi / Mervin Tran	3031	2009/2010 season (70%)	386	221	175	0	0
8	ITA	Stefania Berton / Ondrej Hotárek	2965	2011/2012 season (100%)	612	324	292	250	225
8	ITA	Stefania Berton / Ondrej Hotárek	2965	2010/2011 season (100%)	551	236	0	250	225
8	ITA	Stefania Berton / Ondrej Hotárek	2965	2009/2010 season (70%)	293	0	0	158	142
9	CAN	Meagan Duhamel / Eric Radford	2857	2011/2012 season (100%)	787	525	324	0	0
9	CAN	Meagan Duhamel / Eric Radford	2857	2010/2011 season (100%)	756	262	0	203	0
9	CAN	Meagan Duhamel / Eric Radford	2857	2009/2010 season (70%)	0	0	0	0	0
10	GER	Maylin Hausch / Daniel Wende	2527	2011/2012 season (100%)	446	191	0	250	182
10	GER	Maylin Hausch / Daniel Wende	2527	2010/2011 season (100%)	496	324	213	250	164
10	GER	Maylin Hausch / Daniel Wende	2527	2009/2010 season (70%)	253	0	0	175	127
11	CAN	Kirsten Moore-Towers / Dylan Moscovitch	2307	2011/2012 season (100%)	0	324	324	0	0
11	CAN	Kirsten Moore-Towers / Dylan Moscovitch	2307	2010/2011 season (100%)	574	472	360	0	0
11	CAN	Kirsten Moore-Towers / Dylan Moscovitch	2307	2009/2010 season (70%)	253	165	0	0	0
12	CAN	Paige Lawrence / Rudi Swiegers	2216	2011/2012 season (100%)	446	191	0	164	0
12	CAN	Paige Lawrence / Rudi Swiegers	2216	2010/2011 season (100%)	680	324	262	0	0
12	CAN	Paige Lawrence / Rudi Swiegers	2216	2009/2010 season (70%)	0	149	0	0	0
13	RUS	Ksenia Stolbova / Fedor Klimov	2212	2011/2012 season (100%)	680	292	213	0	0
13	RUS	Ksenia Stolbova / Fedor Klimov	2212	2010/2011 season (100%)	450	315	262	0	0
13	RUS	Ksenia Stolbova / Fedor Klimov	2212	2009/2010 season (70%)	284	158	130	0	0
14	USA	Amanda Evora / Mark Ladwig	2162	2011/2012 season (100%)	496	292	292	0	0
14	USA	Amanda Evora / Mark Ladwig	2162	2010/2011 season (100%)	496	324	262	0	0
14	USA	Amanda Evora / Mark Ladwig	2162	2009/2010 season (70%)	362	183	149	0	0
15	CHN	Dan Zhang / Hao Zhang	2113	2011/2012 season (100%)	0	583	360	0	0
15	CHN	Dan Zhang / Hao Zhang	2113	2010/2011 season (100%)	0	0	0	0	0
15	CHN	Dan Zhang / Hao Zhang	2113	2009/2010 season (70%)	588	330	252	0	0
16	RUS	Katarina Gerboldt / Alexander Enbert	1866	2011/2012 season (100%)	0	262	0	225	225
16	RUS	Katarina Gerboldt / Alexander Enbert	1866	2010/2011 season (100%)	612	292	0	250	0
16	RUS	Katarina Gerboldt / Alexander Enbert	1866	2009/2010 season (70%)	0	0	0	0	0
17	RUS	Lubov Iliushechkina / Nodari Maisuradze	1684	2011/2012 season (100%)	0	262	236	203	0
17	RUS	Lubov Iliushechkina / Nodari Maisuradze	1684	2010/2011 season (100%)	0	583	400	0	0
17	RUS	Lubov Iliushechkina / Nodari Maisuradze	1684	2009/2010 season (70%)	0	183	0	0	0
18	GBR	Stacey Kemp / David King	1574	2011/2012 season (100%)	362	0	0	0	0
18	GBR	Stacey Kemp / David King	1574	2010/2011 season (100%)	402	191	191	164	0
18	GBR	Stacey Kemp / David King	1574	2009/2010 season (70%)	205	149	0	115	0
19	USA	Caydee Denney / John Coughlin	1513	2011/2012 season (100%)	756	292	262	203	0
19	USA	Caydee Denney / John Coughlin	1513	2010/2011 season (100%)	0	0	0	0	0
19	USA	Caydee Denney / John Coughlin	1513	2009/2010 season (70%)	0	0	0	0	0
20	USA	Mary Beth Marley / Rockne Brubaker	1498	2011/2012 season (100%)	680	213	0	203	0
20	USA	Mary Beth Marley / Rockne Brubaker	1498	2010/2011 season (100%)	402	0	0	0	0
20	USA	Mary Beth Marley / Rockne Brubaker	1498	2009/2010 season (70%)	0	0	0	0	0
21	CHN	Huibo Dong / Yiming Wu	1477	2011/2012 season (100%)	325	236	0	0	0
21	CHN	Huibo Dong / Yiming Wu	1477	2010/2011 season (100%)	325	213	213	0	0
21	CHN	Huibo Dong / Yiming Wu	1477	2009/2010 season (70%)	281	165	165	0	0
22	CHN	Xiaoyu Yu / Yang Jin	1450	2011/2012 season (100%)	450	236	230	0	0
22	CHN	Xiaoyu Yu / Yang Jin	1450	2010/2011 season (100%)	0	284	250	0	0
22	CHN	Xiaoyu Yu / Yang Jin	1450	2009/2010 season (70%)	0	0	0	0	0
23	CZE	Klara Kadlecova / Petr Bidar	1441	2011/2012 season (100%)	0	191	164	0	0
23	CZE	Klara Kadlecova / Petr Bidar	1441	2010/2011 season (100%)	446	236	133	182	0
23	CZE	Klara Kadlecova / Petr Bidar	1441	2009/2010 season (70%)	89	76	0	0	0
24	GER	Mari Vartmann / Aaron Van Cleave	1433	2011/2012 season (100%)	551	0	0	250	225
24	GER	Mari Vartmann / Aaron Van Cleave	1433	2010/2011 season (100%)	0	0	0	225	182
24	GER	Mari Vartmann / Aaron Van Cleave	1433	2009/2010 season (70%)	0	0	0	0	0
25	USA	Marissa Castelli / Simon Shnapir	1300	2011/2012 season (100%)	0	213	0	182	0
25	USA	Marissa Castelli / Simon Shnapir	1300	2010/2011 season (100%)	0	292	236	0	0
25	USA	Marissa Castelli / Simon Shnapir	1300	2009/2010 season (70%)	228	149	0	0	0
26	CHN	Yue Zhang / Lei Wang	1272	2011/2012 season (100%)	362	0	0	0	0
26	CHN	Yue Zhang / Lei Wang	1272	2010/2011 season (100%)	362	191	0	0	0
26	CHN	Yue Zhang / Lei Wang	1272	2009/2010 season (70%)	347	199	158	0	0
27	USA	Ashley Cain / Joshua Reagan	1238	2011/2012 season (100%)	0	236	0	182	0
27	USA	Ashley Cain / Joshua Reagan	1238	2010/2011 season (100%)	365	230	225	0	0
27	USA	Ashley Cain / Joshua Reagan	1238	2009/2010 season (70%)	0	0	0	0	0
28	CAN	Brittany Jones / Kurtis Gaskell	1225	2011/2012 season (100%)	0	213	0	0	0
28	CAN	Brittany Jones / Kurtis Gaskell	1225	2010/2011 season (100%)	295	207	182	0	0
28	CAN	Brittany Jones / Kurtis Gaskell	1225	2009/2010 season (70%)	186	142	84	0	0
29	RUS	Ekaterina Petaikina / Maxim Kurdyukov	1021	2011/2012 season (100%)	295	255	203	0	0
29	RUS	Ekaterina Petaikina / Maxim Kurdyukov	1021	2010/2011 season (100%)	0	164	0	0	0
29	RUS	Ekaterina Petaikina / Maxim Kurdyukov	1021	2009/2010 season (70%)	0	104	0	0	0
30	FRA	Vanessa James / Morgan Ciprès	1015	2011/2012 season (100%)	496	191	0	164	164
30	FRA	Vanessa James / Morgan Ciprès	1015	2010/2011 season (100%)	0	0	0	0	0
30	FRA	Vanessa James / Morgan Ciprès	1015	2009/2010 season (70%)	0	0	0	0	0
31	CAN	Margaret Purdy / Michael Marinaro	1000	2011/2012 season (100%)	328	203	97	0	0
31	CAN	Margaret Purdy / Michael Marinaro	1000	2010/2011 season (100%)	0	108	97	0	0
31	CAN	Margaret Purdy / Michael Marinaro	1000	2009/2010 season (70%)	167	93	68	0	0
32	CAN	Natasha Purich / Raymond Schultz	925	2011/2012 season (100%)	0	191	0	0	0
32	CAN	Natasha Purich / Raymond Schultz	925	2010/2011 season (100%)	328	203	203	0	0
32	CAN	Natasha Purich / Raymond Schultz	925	2009/2010 season (70%)	0	0	0	0	0
33	GER	Katharina Gierok / Florian Just	907	2011/2012 season (100%)	0	0	0	225	164
33	GER	Katharina Gierok / Florian Just	907	2010/2011 season (100%)	293	0	0	225	0
33	GER	Katharina Gierok / Florian Just	907	2009/2010 season (70%)	0	0	0	0	0
34	CAN	Jessica Dube / Sebastien Wolfe	900	2011/2012 season (100%)	402	262	236	0	0
34	CAN	Jessica Dube / Sebastien Wolfe	900	2010/2011 season (100%)	0	0	0	0	0
34	CAN	Jessica Dube / Sebastien Wolfe	900	2009/2010 season (70%)	0	0	0	0	0
35	BLR	Lubov Bakirova / Mikalai Kamianchuk	875	2011/2012 season (100%)	325	0	0	225	0
35	BLR	Lubov Bakirova / Mikalai Kamianchuk	875	2010/2011 season (100%)	325	0	0	0	0
35	BLR	Lubov Bakirova / Mikalai Kamianchuk	875	2009/2010 season (70%)	0	0	0	0	0
36	CAN	Katherine Bobak / Ian Beharry	831	2011/2012 season (100%)	266	315	250	0	0
36	CAN	Katherine Bobak / Ian Beharry	831	2010/2011 season (100%)	0	0	0	0	0
36	CAN	Katherine Bobak / Ian Beharry	831	2009/2010 season (70%)	0	0	0	0	0
37	EST	Natalja Zabijako / Sergei Kulbach	796	2011/2012 season (100%)	0	182	0	203	0
37	EST	Natalja Zabijako / Sergei Kulbach	796	2010/2011 season (100%)	247	0	0	164	0
37	EST	Natalja Zabijako / Sergei Kulbach	796	2009/2010 season (70%)	0	0	0	0	0
38	USA	Kylie Duarte / Colin Grafton	792	2011/2012 season (100%)	239	148	108	0	0
38	USA	Kylie Duarte / Colin Grafton	792	2010/2011 season (100%)	0	164	133	0	0
38	USA	Kylie Duarte / Colin Grafton	792	2009/2010 season (70%)	0	76	0	0	0
39	CAN	Taylor Steele / Robert Schultz	765	2011/2012 season (100%)	0	213	0	0	0
39	CAN	Taylor Steele / Robert Schultz	765	2010/2011 season (100%)	0	255	182	0	0
39	CAN	Taylor Steele / Robert Schultz	765	2009/2010 season (70%)	0	115	76	0	0
40	USA	Britney Simpson / Matthew Blackmer	728	2011/2012 season (100%)	194	284	250	0	0
40	USA	Britney Simpson / Matthew Blackmer	728	2010/2011 season (100%)	0	0	0	0	0
40	USA	Britney Simpson / Matthew Blackmer	728	2009/2010 season (70%)	0	0	0	0	0
41	AUT	Stina Martini / Severin Kiefer	712	2011/2012 season (100%)	192	0	0	164	0
41	AUT	Stina Martini / Severin Kiefer	712	2010/2011 season (100%)	192	0	0	164	0
41	AUT	Stina Martini / Severin Kiefer	712	2009/2010 season (70%)	0	0	0	0	0
42	ISR	Danielle Montalbano / Evgeni Krasnopolski	699	2011/2012 season (100%)	293	0	0	203	203
42	ISR	Danielle Montalbano / Evgeni Krasnopolski	699	2010/2011 season (100%)	0	0	0	0	0
42	ISR	Danielle Montalbano / Evgeni Krasnopolski	699	2009/2010 season (70%)	0	0	0	0	0
43	RUS	Anastasia Martiusheva / Alexei Rogonov	649	2011/2012 season (100%)	0	0	0	250	0
43	RUS	Anastasia Martiusheva / Alexei Rogonov	649	2010/2011 season (100%)	0	0	0	250	0
43	RUS	Anastasia Martiusheva / Alexei Rogonov	649	2009/2010 season (70%)	0	149	0	0	0
44	ITA	Carolina Gillespie / Luca Dematte	648	2011/2012 season (100%)	264	0	0	0	0
44	ITA	Carolina Gillespie / Luca Dematte	648	2010/2011 season (100%)	264	120	0	0	0
44	ITA	Carolina Gillespie / Luca Dematte	648	2009/2010 season (70%)	0	0	0	0	0
45	RUS	Alexandra Vasilieva / Yuri Shevchuk	644	2011/2012 season (100%)	0	108	0	0	0
45	RUS	Alexandra Vasilieva / Yuri Shevchuk	644	2010/2011 season (100%)	174	108	0	0	0
45	RUS	Alexandra Vasilieva / Yuri Shevchuk	644	2009/2010 season (70%)	0	127	127	0	0
46	USA	Haven Denney / Brandon Frazier	618	2011/2012 season (100%)	365	133	120	0	0
46	USA	Haven Denney / Brandon Frazier	618	2010/2011 season (100%)	0	0	0	0	0
46	USA	Haven Denney / Brandon Frazier	618	2009/2010 season (70%)	0	0	0	0	0
47	FRA	Daria Popova / Bruno Massot	584	2011/2012 season (100%)	402	0	0	182	0
47	FRA	Daria Popova / Bruno Massot	584	2010/2011 season (100%)	0	0	0	0	0
47	FRA	Daria Popova / Bruno Massot	584	2009/2010 season (70%)	0	0	0	0	0
48	POL	Magdalena Klatka / Radoslaw Chruscinski	534	2011/2012 season (100%)	141	133	133	0	0
48	POL	Magdalena Klatka / Radoslaw Chruscinski	534	2010/2011 season (100%)	127	0	0	0	0
48	POL	Magdalena Klatka / Radoslaw Chruscinski	534	2009/2010 season (70%)	0	0	0	0	0
49	CHN	Meiyi Li / Bo Jiang	494	2011/2012 season (100%)	215	182	97	0	0
49	CHN	Meiyi Li / Bo Jiang	494	2010/2011 season (100%)	0	0	0	0	0
49	CHN	Meiyi Li / Bo Jiang	494	2009/2010 season (70%)	0	0	0	0	0
50	USA	Jessica Calalang / Zack Sidhu	482	2011/2012 season (100%)	0	203	182	0	0
50	USA	Jessica Calalang / Zack Sidhu	482	2010/2011 season (100%)	0	97	0	0	0
50	USA	Jessica Calalang / Zack Sidhu	482	2009/2010 season (70%)	0	0	0	0	0
51	ITA	Nicole Della Monica / Matteo Guarise	478	2011/2012 season (100%)	275	0	0	203	0
51	ITA	Nicole Della Monica / Matteo Guarise	478	2010/2011 season (100%)	0	0	0	0	0
51	ITA	Nicole Della Monica / Matteo Guarise	478	2009/2010 season (70%)	0	0	0	0	0
52	USA	Tiffany Vise / Don Baldwin	461	2011/2012 season (100%)	0	236	0	0	0
52	USA	Tiffany Vise / Don Baldwin	461	2010/2011 season (100%)	0	0	0	225	0
52	USA	Tiffany Vise / Don Baldwin	461	2009/2010 season (70%)	0	0	0	0	0
53	USA	Brynn Carman / Aj Reiss	451	2011/2012 season (100%)	0	0	0	0	0
53	USA	Brynn Carman / Aj Reiss	451	2010/2011 season (100%)	0	164	120	0	0
53	USA	Brynn Carman / Aj Reiss	451	2009/2010 season (70%)	99	68	0	0	0
54	USA	Rena Inoue / John Baldwin	431	2011/2012 season (100%)	0	0	0	0	0
54	USA	Rena Inoue / John Baldwin	431	2010/2011 season (100%)	0	0	0	0	0
54	USA	Rena Inoue / John Baldwin	431	2009/2010 season (70%)	0	227	204	0	0
55	RUS	Tatiana Tudvaseva / Sergei Lisiev	410	2011/2012 season (100%)	0	207	203	0	0
55	RUS	Tatiana Tudvaseva / Sergei Lisiev	410	2010/2011 season (100%)	0	0	0	0	0
55	RUS	Tatiana Tudvaseva / Sergei Lisiev	410	2009/2010 season (70%)	0	0	0	0	0
56	RUS	Vasilisa Davankova / Andrei Deputat	405	2011/2012 season (100%)	405	0	0	0	0
56	RUS	Vasilisa Davankova / Andrei Deputat	405	2010/2011 season (100%)	0	0	0	0	0
56	RUS	Vasilisa Davankova / Andrei Deputat	405	2009/2010 season (70%)	0	0	0	0	0
57	RUS	Kristina Astakhova / Nikita Bochkov	374	2011/2012 season (100%)	0	0	0	0	0
57	RUS	Kristina Astakhova / Nikita Bochkov	374	2010/2011 season (100%)	266	108	0	0	0
57	RUS	Kristina Astakhova / Nikita Bochkov	374	2009/2010 season (70%)	0	0	0	0	0
58	SUI	Anaïs Morand / Timothy Leemann	371	2011/2012 season (100%)	214	0	0	0	0
58	SUI	Anaïs Morand / Timothy Leemann	371	2010/2011 season (100%)	157	0	0	0	0
58	SUI	Anaïs Morand / Timothy Leemann	371	2009/2010 season (70%)	0	0	0	0	0
59	UKR	Ekaterina Kostenko / Roman Talan	370	2011/2012 season (100%)	0	0	0	0	0
59	UKR	Ekaterina Kostenko / Roman Talan	370	2010/2011 season (100%)	0	0	0	0	0
59	UKR	Ekaterina Kostenko / Roman Talan	370	2009/2010 season (70%)	113	0	0	142	115
60	RUS	Evgania Tarasova / Egor Chudin	367	2011/2012 season (100%)	0	0	0	164	0
60	RUS	Evgania Tarasova / Egor Chudin	367	2010/2011 season (100%)	0	0	0	203	0
60	RUS	Evgania Tarasova / Egor Chudin	367	2009/2010 season (70%)	0	0	0	0	0
61	GBR	Sally Hoolin / James Hunt	355	2011/2012 season (100%)	173	0	0	182	0
61	GBR	Sally Hoolin / James Hunt	355	2010/2011 season (100%)	0	0	0	0	0
61	GBR	Sally Hoolin / James Hunt	355	2009/2010 season (70%)	0	0	0	0	0
62	UKR	Julia Lavrentieva / Yuri Rudik	349	2011/2012 season (100%)	127	108	0	0	0
62	UKR	Julia Lavrentieva / Yuri Rudik	349	2010/2011 season (100%)	114	0	0	0	0
62	UKR	Julia Lavrentieva / Yuri Rudik	349	2009/2010 season (70%)	0	0	0	0	0
63	POL	Natalia Kaliszek / Michal Kaliszek	346	2011/2012 season (100%)	0	0	0	182	164
63	POL	Natalia Kaliszek / Michal Kaliszek	346	2010/2011 season (100%)	0	0	0	0	0
63	POL	Natalia Kaliszek / Michal Kaliszek	346	2009/2010 season (70%)	0	0	0	0	0
64	USA	Cassie Andrews / Timothy Leduc	335	2011/2012 season (100%)	0	0	0	0	0
64	USA	Cassie Andrews / Timothy Leduc	335	2010/2011 season (100%)	215	120	0	0	0
64	USA	Cassie Andrews / Timothy Leduc	335	2009/2010 season (70%)	0	0	0	0	0
65	RUS	Valeria Grechukhina / Andrei Filonov	296	2011/2012 season (100%)	0	148	148	0	0
65	RUS	Valeria Grechukhina / Andrei Filonov	296	2010/2011 season (100%)	0	0	0	0	0
65	RUS	Valeria Grechukhina / Andrei Filonov	296	2009/2010 season (70%)	0	0	0	0	0
66	RUS	Ekaterina Krutskikh / Vladimir Morozov	268	2011/2012 season (100%)	0	148	120	0	0
66	RUS	Ekaterina Krutskikh / Vladimir Morozov	268	2010/2011 season (100%)	0	0	0	0	0
66	RUS	Ekaterina Krutskikh / Vladimir Morozov	268	2009/2010 season (70%)	0	0	0	0	0
67	USA	Andrea Poapst / Chris Knierim	250	2011/2012 season (100%)	0	0	0	250	0
67	USA	Andrea Poapst / Chris Knierim	250	2010/2011 season (100%)	0	0	0	0	0
67	USA	Andrea Poapst / Chris Knierim	250	2009/2010 season (70%)	0	0	0	0	0
68	CZE	Alexandra Herbrikova / Rudy Halmaert	237	2011/2012 season (100%)	237	0	0	0	0
68	CZE	Alexandra Herbrikova / Rudy Halmaert	237	2010/2011 season (100%)	0	0	0	0	0
68	CZE	Alexandra Herbrikova / Rudy Halmaert	237	2009/2010 season (70%)	0	0	0	0	0
69	BLR	Maria Paliakova / Mikhail Fomichev	228	2011/2012 season (100%)	0	120	108	0	0
69	BLR	Maria Paliakova / Mikhail Fomichev	228	2010/2011 season (100%)	0	0	0	0	0
69	BLR	Maria Paliakova / Mikhail Fomichev	228	2009/2010 season (70%)	0	0	0	0	0
70	TPE	Amanda Sunyoto-Yang / Darryll Sulindro-Yang	205	2011/2012 season (100%)	0	0	0	0	0
70	TPE	Amanda Sunyoto-Yang / Darryll Sulindro-Yang	205	2010/2011 season (100%)	0	0	0	0	0
70	TPE	Amanda Sunyoto-Yang / Darryll Sulindro-Yang	205	2009/2010 season (70%)	205	0	0	0	0
71	PRK	Ji Hyang Ri / Won Hyok Thae	203	2011/2012 season (100%)	0	0	0	0	0
71	PRK	Ji Hyang Ri / Won Hyok Thae	203	2010/2011 season (100%)	0	0	0	203	0
71	PRK	Ji Hyang Ri / Won Hyok Thae	203	2009/2010 season (70%)	0	0	0	0	0
71	USA	Molly Aaron / Daniyel Cohen	203	2011/2012 season (100%)	0	0	0	0	0
71	USA	Molly Aaron / Daniyel Cohen	203	2010/2011 season (100%)	0	0	0	203	0
71	USA	Molly Aaron / Daniyel Cohen	203	2009/2010 season (70%)	0	0	0	0	0
73	FRA	Camille Mendoza / Christopher Boyadji	200	2011/2012 season (100%)	103	97	0	0	0
73	FRA	Camille Mendoza / Christopher Boyadji	200	2010/2011 season (100%)	0	0	0	0	0
73	FRA	Camille Mendoza / Christopher Boyadji	200	2009/2010 season (70%)	0	0	0	0	0
74	POL	Joanna Sulej / Mateusz Chruscinski	193	2011/2012 season (100%)	0	0	0	0	0
74	POL	Joanna Sulej / Mateusz Chruscinski	193	2010/2011 season (100%)	0	0	0	0	0
74	POL	Joanna Sulej / Mateusz Chruscinski	193	2009/2010 season (70%)	193	0	0	0	0
75	GBR	Erica Risseeuw / Robert Paxton	185	2011/2012 season (100%)	0	0	0	0	0
75	GBR	Erica Risseeuw / Robert Paxton	185	2010/2011 season (100%)	0	0	0	0	0
75	GBR	Erica Risseeuw / Robert Paxton	185	2009/2010 season (70%)	185	0	0	0	0
76	SWE	Ronja Roll / Gustav Forsgren	182	2011/2012 season (100%)	0	0	0	182	0
76	SWE	Ronja Roll / Gustav Forsgren	182	2010/2011 season (100%)	0	0	0	0	0
76	SWE	Ronja Roll / Gustav Forsgren	182	2009/2010 season (70%)	0	0	0	0	0
76	BUL	Alexandra Malakhova / Leri Kenchadze	182	2011/2012 season (100%)	0	0	0	0	0
76	BUL	Alexandra Malakhova / Leri Kenchadze	182	2010/2011 season (100%)	0	0	0	182	0
76	BUL	Alexandra Malakhova / Leri Kenchadze	182	2009/2010 season (70%)	0	0	0	0	0
76	USA	Gretchen Donlan / Andrew Speroff	182	2011/2012 season (100%)	0	0	0	0	0
76	USA	Gretchen Donlan / Andrew Speroff	182	2010/2011 season (100%)	0	0	0	182	0
76	USA	Gretchen Donlan / Andrew Speroff	182	2009/2010 season (70%)	0	0	0	0	0
76	USA	Lindsay Davis / Themistocles Leftheris	182	2011/2012 season (100%)	0	0	0	0	0
76	USA	Lindsay Davis / Themistocles Leftheris	182	2010/2011 season (100%)	0	0	0	182	0
76	USA	Lindsay Davis / Themistocles Leftheris	182	2009/2010 season (70%)	0	0	0	0	0
76	USA	Erika Smith / Nathan Bartholomay	182	2011/2012 season (100%)	0	0	0	0	0
76	USA	Erika Smith / Nathan Bartholomay	182	2010/2011 season (100%)	0	0	0	182	0
76	USA	Erika Smith / Nathan Bartholomay	182	2009/2010 season (70%)	0	0	0	0	0
76	RUS	Tatiana Novik / Andrei Novoselov	182	2011/2012 season (100%)	0	0	0	182	0
76	RUS	Tatiana Novik / Andrei Novoselov	182	2010/2011 season (100%)	0	0	0	0	0
76	RUS	Tatiana Novik / Andrei Novoselov	182	2009/2010 season (70%)	0	0	0	0	0
82	RUS	Kamila Gainetdinova / Ivan Bich	174	2011/2012 season (100%)	174	0	0	0	0
82	RUS	Kamila Gainetdinova / Ivan Bich	174	2010/2011 season (100%)	0	0	0	0	0
82	RUS	Kamila Gainetdinova / Ivan Bich	174	2009/2010 season (70%)	0	0	0	0	0
83	RUS	Lina Fedorova / Maxim Miroshkin	164	2011/2012 season (100%)	0	164	0	0	0
83	RUS	Lina Fedorova / Maxim Miroshkin	164	2010/2011 season (100%)	0	0	0	0	0
83	RUS	Lina Fedorova / Maxim Miroshkin	164	2009/2010 season (70%)	0	0	0	0	0
83	USA	Madeline Aaron / Max Settlage	164	2011/2012 season (100%)	0	164	0	0	0
83	USA	Madeline Aaron / Max Settlage	164	2010/2011 season (100%)	0	0	0	0	0
83	USA	Madeline Aaron / Max Settlage	164	2009/2010 season (70%)	0	0	0	0	0
85	USA	Chloe Katz / Joseph Lynch	158	2011/2012 season (100%)	0	0	0	0	0
85	USA	Chloe Katz / Joseph Lynch	158	2010/2011 season (100%)	0	0	0	0	0
85	USA	Chloe Katz / Joseph Lynch	158	2009/2010 season (70%)	0	0	0	158	0
86	CAN	Hayleigh Bell / Alistair Sylvester	157	2011/2012 season (100%)	157	0	0	0	0
86	CAN	Hayleigh Bell / Alistair Sylvester	157	2010/2011 season (100%)	0	0	0	0	0
86	CAN	Hayleigh Bell / Alistair Sylvester	157	2009/2010 season (70%)	0	0	0	0	0
87	USA	Olivia Oltmanns / Joshua Santillan	133	2011/2012 season (100%)	0	133	0	0	0
87	USA	Olivia Oltmanns / Joshua Santillan	133	2010/2011 season (100%)	0	0	0	0	0
87	USA	Olivia Oltmanns / Joshua Santillan	133	2009/2010 season (70%)	0	0	0	0	0
88	SVK	Gabriela Cermanová / Martin Hanulák	127	2011/2012 season (100%)	0	0	0	0	0
88	SVK	Gabriela Cermanová / Martin Hanulák	127	2010/2011 season (100%)	0	0	0	0	0
88	SVK	Gabriela Cermanová / Martin Hanulák	127	2009/2010 season (70%)	0	0	0	127	0
89	BUL	Nina Ivanova / Filip Zalevski	121	2011/2012 season (100%)	0	0	0	0	0
89	BUL	Nina Ivanova / Filip Zalevski	121	2010/2011 season (100%)	0	0	0	0	0
89	BUL	Nina Ivanova / Filip Zalevski	121	2009/2010 season (70%)	121	0	0	0	0
90	POL	Elizabeth Harb / Patryk Szalasny	115	2011/2012 season (100%)	0	0	0	0	0
90	POL	Elizabeth Harb / Patryk Szalasny	115	2010/2011 season (100%)	0	0	0	0	0
90	POL	Elizabeth Harb / Patryk Szalasny	115	2009/2010 season (70%)	0	0	0	115	0
91	USA	Morgan Agster / Adam Civiello	97	2011/2012 season (100%)	0	0	0	0	0
91	USA	Morgan Agster / Adam Civiello	97	2010/2011 season (100%)	0	97	0	0	0
91	USA	Morgan Agster / Adam Civiello	97	2009/2010 season (70%)	0	0	0	0	0
91	POL	Aleksandra Malinkiewicz / Sebastian Lofek	97	2011/2012 season (100%)	0	97	0	0	0
91	POL	Aleksandra Malinkiewicz / Sebastian Lofek	97	2010/2011 season (100%)	0	0	0	0	0
91	POL	Aleksandra Malinkiewicz / Sebastian Lofek	97	2009/2010 season (70%)	0	0	0	0	0
93	NED	Marylie Jorg / Benjamin Koenderink	68	2011/2012 season (100%)	0	0	0	0	0
93	NED	Marylie Jorg / Benjamin Koenderink	68	2010/2011 season (100%)	0	0	0	0	0
93	NED	Marylie Jorg / Benjamin Koenderink	68	2009/2010 season (70%)	0	68	0	0	0

==== Ice dance (130 couples) ====
As of 31 March 2012

Rank	Nation	Couple	Points	Season	ISU Championships or Olympics	(Junior) Grand Prix and Final		Selected International Competition	
Rank	Nation	Couple	Points	Season	Best	Best	2nd Best	Best	2nd Best
1	USA	Meryl Davis / Charlie White	5015	2011/2012 season (100%)	1080	800	400	0	0
1	USA	Meryl Davis / Charlie White	5015	2010/2011 season (100%)	1200	800	400	0	0
1	USA	Meryl Davis / Charlie White	5015	2009/2010 season (70%)	756	560	280	175	0
2	FRA	Nathalie Péchalat / Fabian Bourzat	4569	2011/2012 season (100%)	972	648	360	0	0
2	FRA	Nathalie Péchalat / Fabian Bourzat	4569	2010/2011 season (100%)	875	720	400	250	250
2	FRA	Nathalie Péchalat / Fabian Bourzat	4569	2009/2010 season (70%)	613	454	252	0	0
3	CAN	Tessa Virtue / Scott Moir	4434	2011/2012 season (100%)	1200	720	400	250	0
3	CAN	Tessa Virtue / Scott Moir	4434	2010/2011 season (100%)	1080	0	0	0	0
3	CAN	Tessa Virtue / Scott Moir	4434	2009/2010 season (70%)	840	504	280	0	0
4	USA	Maia Shibutani / Alex Shibutani	3546	2011/2012 season (100%)	612	525	400	225	0
4	USA	Maia Shibutani / Alex Shibutani	3546	2010/2011 season (100%)	972	324	324	164	0
4	USA	Maia Shibutani / Alex Shibutani	3546	2009/2010 season (70%)	256	199	175	0	0
5	CAN	Kaitlyn Weaver / Andrew Poje	3490	2011/2012 season (100%)	875	583	360	0	0
5	CAN	Kaitlyn Weaver / Andrew Poje	3490	2010/2011 season (100%)	787	525	360	0	0
5	CAN	Kaitlyn Weaver / Andrew Poje	3490	2009/2010 season (70%)	588	227	165	0	0
6	RUS	Ekaterina Bobrova / Dmitri Soloviev	3367	2011/2012 season (100%)	756	472	400	0	0
6	RUS	Ekaterina Bobrova / Dmitri Soloviev	3367	2010/2011 season (100%)	756	583	400	0	0
6	RUS	Ekaterina Bobrova / Dmitri Soloviev	3367	2009/2010 season (70%)	402	204	204	0	0
7	ITA	Anna Cappellini / Luca Lanotte	3036	2011/2012 season (100%)	709	324	324	0	0
7	ITA	Anna Cappellini / Luca Lanotte	3036	2010/2011 season (100%)	574	262	0	250	225
7	ITA	Anna Cappellini / Luca Lanotte	3036	2009/2010 season (70%)	347	368	252	0	0
8	FRA	Pernelle Carron / Lloyd Jones	2837	2011/2012 season (100%)	446	324	236	225	0
8	FRA	Pernelle Carron / Lloyd Jones	2837	2010/2011 season (100%)	377	292	262	250	250
8	FRA	Pernelle Carron / Lloyd Jones	2837	2009/2010 season (70%)	264	0	0	175	175
9	RUS	Ekaterina Riazanova / Ilia Tkachenko	2711	2011/2012 season (100%)	551	292	262	0	0
9	RUS	Ekaterina Riazanova / Ilia Tkachenko	2711	2010/2011 season (100%)	496	360	262	203	0
9	RUS	Ekaterina Riazanova / Ilia Tkachenko	2711	2009/2010 season (70%)	0	165	0	158	127
10	RUS	Elena Ilinykh / Nikita Katsalapov	2657	2011/2012 season (100%)	787	324	292	0	0
10	RUS	Elena Ilinykh / Nikita Katsalapov	2657	2010/2011 season (100%)	638	324	292	0	0
10	RUS	Elena Ilinykh / Nikita Katsalapov	2657	2009/2010 season (70%)	350	221	175	0	0
11	GER	Nelli Zhiganshina / Alexander Gazsi	2423	2011/2012 season (100%)	418	292	292	250	250
11	GER	Nelli Zhiganshina / Alexander Gazsi	2423	2010/2011 season (100%)	446	0	0	250	225
11	GER	Nelli Zhiganshina / Alexander Gazsi	2423	2009/2010 season (70%)	0	0	0	142	0
12	GBR	Penny Coomes / Nicholas Buckland	2277	2011/2012 season (100%)	496	292	0	250	225
12	GBR	Penny Coomes / Nicholas Buckland	2277	2010/2011 season (100%)	247	191	191	203	182
12	GBR	Penny Coomes / Nicholas Buckland	2277	2009/2010 season (70%)	121	0	0	142	127
13	CHN	Xintong Huang / Xun Zheng	2061	2011/2012 season (100%)	377	262	236	0	0
13	CHN	Xintong Huang / Xun Zheng	2061	2010/2011 season (100%)	496	262	262	0	0
13	CHN	Xintong Huang / Xun Zheng	2061	2009/2010 season (70%)	428	183	149	115	0
14	RUS	Ekaterina Pushkash / Jonathan Guerreiro	1836	2011/2012 season (100%)	0	236	213	225	0
14	RUS	Ekaterina Pushkash / Jonathan Guerreiro	1836	2010/2011 season (100%)	450	255	250	0	0
14	RUS	Ekaterina Pushkash / Jonathan Guerreiro	1836	2009/2010 season (70%)	207	175	161	0	0
15	RUS	Ksenia Monko / Kirill Khaliavin	1804	2011/2012 season (100%)	0	0	0	0	0
15	RUS	Ksenia Monko / Kirill Khaliavin	1804	2010/2011 season (100%)	500	350	250	0	0
15	RUS	Ksenia Monko / Kirill Khaliavin	1804	2009/2010 season (70%)	284	245	175	0	0
16	CAN	Kharis Ralph / Asher Hill	1778	2011/2012 season (100%)	339	262	0	203	0
16	CAN	Kharis Ralph / Asher Hill	1778	2010/2011 season (100%)	0	236	213	0	0
16	CAN	Kharis Ralph / Asher Hill	1778	2009/2010 season (70%)	347	178	158	0	0
17	ITA	Lorenza Alessandrini / Simone Vaturi	1653	2011/2012 season (100%)	247	262	0	225	164
17	ITA	Lorenza Alessandrini / Simone Vaturi	1653	2010/2011 season (100%)	173	0	0	225	0
17	ITA	Lorenza Alessandrini / Simone Vaturi	1653	2009/2010 season (70%)	230	158	142	0	0
18	RUS	Victoria Sinitsina / Ruslan Zhiganshin	1640	2011/2012 season (100%)	500	350	250	0	0
18	RUS	Victoria Sinitsina / Ruslan Zhiganshin	1640	2010/2011 season (100%)	0	315	225	0	0
18	RUS	Victoria Sinitsina / Ruslan Zhiganshin	1640	2009/2010 season (70%)	0	115	115	0	0
18	RUS	Kristina Gorshkova / Vitali Butikov	1640	2011/2012 season (100%)	0	213	0	164	0
18	RUS	Kristina Gorshkova / Vitali Butikov	1640	2010/2011 season (100%)	0	292	236	225	203
18	RUS	Kristina Gorshkova / Vitali Butikov	1640	2009/2010 season (70%)	0	149	149	158	0
20	LTU	Isabella Tobias / Deividas Stagniūnas	1620	2011/2012 season (100%)	362	324	262	164	0
20	LTU	Isabella Tobias / Deividas Stagniūnas	1620	2010/2011 season (100%)	305	0	0	203	0
20	LTU	Isabella Tobias / Deividas Stagniūnas	1620	2009/2010 season (70%)	0	0	0	0	0
21	JPN	Cathy Reed / Chris Reed	1617	2011/2012 season (100%)	0	213	0	182	0
21	JPN	Cathy Reed / Chris Reed	1617	2010/2011 season (100%)	339	213	213	0	0
21	JPN	Cathy Reed / Chris Reed	1617	2009/2010 season (70%)	193	149	0	115	0
22	CAN	Alexandra Paul / Mitchell Islam	1536	2011/2012 season (100%)	496	191	0	0	0
22	CAN	Alexandra Paul / Mitchell Islam	1536	2010/2011 season (100%)	0	292	0	0	0
22	CAN	Alexandra Paul / Mitchell Islam	1536	2009/2010 season (70%)	315	127	115	0	0
23	RUS	Alexandra Stepanova / Ivan Bukin	1518	2011/2012 season (100%)	450	284	250	0	0
23	RUS	Alexandra Stepanova / Ivan Bukin	1518	2010/2011 season (100%)	0	284	250	0	0
23	RUS	Alexandra Stepanova / Ivan Bukin	1518	2009/2010 season (70%)	0	0	0	0	0
24	ESP	Sara Hurtado / Adria Diaz	1357	2011/2012 season (100%)	180	191	0	203	0
24	ESP	Sara Hurtado / Adria Diaz	1357	2010/2011 season (100%)	215	164	97	203	0
24	ESP	Sara Hurtado / Adria Diaz	1357	2009/2010 season (70%)	72	104	68	0	0
25	ITA	Charlene Guignard / Marco Fabbri	1354	2011/2012 season (100%)	293	0	0	250	225
25	ITA	Charlene Guignard / Marco Fabbri	1354	2010/2011 season (100%)	180	0	0	203	203
25	ITA	Charlene Guignard / Marco Fabbri	1354	2009/2010 season (70%)	0	0	0	0	0
26	CHN	Xiaoyang Yu / Chen Wang	1319	2011/2012 season (100%)	446	236	0	0	0
26	CHN	Xiaoyang Yu / Chen Wang	1319	2010/2011 season (100%)	446	191	0	0	0
26	CHN	Xiaoyang Yu / Chen Wang	1319	2009/2010 season (70%)	281	0	0	0	0
27	CAN	Nicole Orford / Thomas Williams	1299	2011/2012 season (100%)	295	250	148	0	0
27	CAN	Nicole Orford / Thomas Williams	1299	2010/2011 season (100%)	239	203	164	0	0
27	CAN	Nicole Orford / Thomas Williams	1299	2009/2010 season (70%)	0	0	0	0	0
28	GBR	Louise Walden / Owen Edwards	1266	2011/2012 season (100%)	237	0	0	203	164
28	GBR	Louise Walden / Owen Edwards	1266	2010/2011 season (100%)	162	0	0	250	250
28	GBR	Louise Walden / Owen Edwards	1266	2009/2010 season (70%)	0	0	0	0	0
29	USA	Lauri Bonacorsi / Travis Mager	1235	2011/2012 season (100%)	266	225	203	0	0
29	USA	Lauri Bonacorsi / Travis Mager	1235	2010/2011 season (100%)	174	203	164	0	0
29	USA	Lauri Bonacorsi / Travis Mager	1235	2009/2010 season (70%)	0	142	76	0	0
30	FRA	Gabriella Papadakis / Guillaume Cizeron	1234	2011/2012 season (100%)	328	182	182	0	0
30	FRA	Gabriella Papadakis / Guillaume Cizeron	1234	2010/2011 season (100%)	157	203	182	0	0
30	FRA	Gabriella Papadakis / Guillaume Cizeron	1234	2009/2010 season (70%)	0	0	0	0	0
31	USA	Charlotte Lichtman / Dean Copely	1225	2011/2012 season (100%)	0	213	0	0	0
31	USA	Charlotte Lichtman / Dean Copely	1225	2010/2011 season (100%)	405	250	230	0	0
31	USA	Charlotte Lichtman / Dean Copely	1225	2009/2010 season (70%)	0	127	84	0	0
32	USA	Alexandra Aldridge / Daniel Eaton	1215	2011/2012 season (100%)	405	255	225	0	0
32	USA	Alexandra Aldridge / Daniel Eaton	1215	2010/2011 season (100%)	0	182	148	0	0
32	USA	Alexandra Aldridge / Daniel Eaton	1215	2009/2010 season (70%)	0	0	0	0	0
33	UKR	Anastasia Galyeta / Alexei Shumski	1191	2011/2012 season (100%)	0	230	225	0	0
33	UKR	Anastasia Galyeta / Alexei Shumski	1191	2010/2011 season (100%)	141	225	203	0	0
33	UKR	Anastasia Galyeta / Alexei Shumski	1191	2009/2010 season (70%)	167	93	0	0	0
34	RUS	Evgenia Kosigina / Nikolai Moroshkin	1180	2011/2012 season (100%)	0	225	203	0	0
34	RUS	Evgenia Kosigina / Nikolai Moroshkin	1180	2010/2011 season (100%)	295	250	207	0	0
34	RUS	Evgenia Kosigina / Nikolai Moroshkin	1180	2009/2010 season (70%)	0	0	0	0	0
35	FRA	Tiffany Zahorski / Alexis Miart	1090	2011/2012 season (100%)	0	0	0	250	0
35	FRA	Tiffany Zahorski / Alexis Miart	1090	2010/2011 season (100%)	365	225	182	0	0
35	FRA	Tiffany Zahorski / Alexis Miart	1090	2009/2010 season (70%)	0	68	0	0	0
36	USA	Madison Hubbell / Zachary Donohue	1037	2011/2012 season (100%)	551	236	0	250	0
36	USA	Madison Hubbell / Zachary Donohue	1037	2010/2011 season (100%)	0	0	0	0	0
36	USA	Madison Hubbell / Zachary Donohue	1037	2009/2010 season (70%)	0	0	0	0	0
37	EST	Irina Shtork / Taavi Rand	1034	2011/2012 season (100%)	214	225	133	0	0
37	EST	Irina Shtork / Taavi Rand	1034	2010/2011 season (100%)	194	148	120	0	0
37	EST	Irina Shtork / Taavi Rand	1034	2009/2010 season (70%)	83	0	0	0	0
38	UKR	Maria Nosulia / Evgen Kholoniuk	1032	2011/2012 season (100%)	239	250	207	0	0
38	UKR	Maria Nosulia / Evgen Kholoniuk	1032	2010/2011 season (100%)	75	164	97	0	0
38	UKR	Maria Nosulia / Evgen Kholoniuk	1032	2009/2010 season (70%)	0	0	0	0	0
39	USA	Anastasia Cannuscio / Colin McManus	1023	2011/2012 season (100%)	0	0	0	164	0
39	USA	Anastasia Cannuscio / Colin McManus	1023	2010/2011 season (100%)	266	225	182	0	0
39	USA	Anastasia Cannuscio / Colin McManus	1023	2009/2010 season (70%)	0	93	93	0	0
40	UKR	Nadezhda Frolenkova / Mikhail Kasalo	993	2011/2012 season (100%)	113	0	0	182	0
40	UKR	Nadezhda Frolenkova / Mikhail Kasalo	993	2010/2011 season (100%)	237	0	0	182	164
40	UKR	Nadezhda Frolenkova / Mikhail Kasalo	993	2009/2010 season (70%)	0	0	0	115	0
41	USA	Isabella Cannuscio / Ian Lorello	938	2011/2012 season (100%)	0	213	0	225	0
41	USA	Isabella Cannuscio / Ian Lorello	938	2010/2011 season (100%)	0	213	0	0	0
41	USA	Isabella Cannuscio / Ian Lorello	938	2009/2010 season (70%)	0	145	142	0	0
42	RUS	Anna Yanovskaya / Sergey Mozgov	930	2011/2012 season (100%)	365	315	250	0	0
42	RUS	Anna Yanovskaya / Sergey Mozgov	930	2010/2011 season (100%)	0	0	0	0	0
42	RUS	Anna Yanovskaya / Sergey Mozgov	930	2009/2010 season (70%)	0	0	0	0	0
43	GER	Tanja Kolbe / Stefano Caruso	920	2011/2012 season (100%)	264	0	0	250	203
43	GER	Tanja Kolbe / Stefano Caruso	920	2010/2011 season (100%)	0	0	0	203	0
43	GER	Tanja Kolbe / Stefano Caruso	920	2009/2010 season (70%)	0	0	0	0	0
44	USA	Lynn Kriengkrairut / Logan Giulietti-Schmitt	880	2011/2012 season (100%)	0	236	0	250	0
44	USA	Lynn Kriengkrairut / Logan Giulietti-Schmitt	880	2010/2011 season (100%)	0	236	0	0	0
44	USA	Lynn Kriengkrairut / Logan Giulietti-Schmitt	880	2009/2010 season (70%)	0	0	0	158	0
45	GER	Carolina Hermann / Daniel Hermann	840	2011/2012 season (100%)	0	0	0	203	203
45	GER	Carolina Hermann / Daniel Hermann	840	2010/2011 season (100%)	0	0	0	0	0
45	GER	Carolina Hermann / Daniel Hermann	840	2009/2010 season (70%)	0	149	0	158	127
46	CZE	Gabriela Kubova / Dmitri Kiselev	834	2011/2012 season (100%)	140	0	0	225	164
46	CZE	Gabriela Kubova / Dmitri Kiselev	834	2010/2011 season (100%)	0	108	108	0	0
46	CZE	Gabriela Kubova / Dmitri Kiselev	834	2009/2010 season (70%)	89	0	0	0	0
47	ITA	Sofia Sforza / Francesco Fioretti	827	2011/2012 season (100%)	194	164	133	0	0
47	ITA	Sofia Sforza / Francesco Fioretti	827	2010/2011 season (100%)	68	148	120	0	0
47	ITA	Sofia Sforza / Francesco Fioretti	827	2009/2010 season (70%)	0	0	0	0	0
48	CHN	Xueting Guan / Meng Wang	807	2011/2012 season (100%)	0	0	0	0	0
48	CHN	Xueting Guan / Meng Wang	807	2010/2011 season (100%)	402	0	0	0	0
48	CHN	Xueting Guan / Meng Wang	807	2009/2010 season (70%)	253	84	68	0	0
49	AZE	Julia Zlobina / Alexei Sitnikov	778	2011/2012 season (100%)	325	0	0	250	203
49	AZE	Julia Zlobina / Alexei Sitnikov	778	2010/2011 season (100%)	0	0	0	0	0
49	AZE	Julia Zlobina / Alexei Sitnikov	778	2009/2010 season (70%)	0	0	0	0	0
50	SUI	Ramona Elsener / Florian Roost	770	2011/2012 season (100%)	0	0	0	182	164
50	SUI	Ramona Elsener / Florian Roost	770	2010/2011 season (100%)	127	133	0	164	0
50	SUI	Ramona Elsener / Florian Roost	770	2009/2010 season (70%)	0	0	0	0	0
51	USA	Madison Chock / Evan Bates	757	2011/2012 season (100%)	0	292	262	203	0
51	USA	Madison Chock / Evan Bates	757	2010/2011 season (100%)	0	0	0	0	0
51	USA	Madison Chock / Evan Bates	757	2009/2010 season (70%)	0	0	0	0	0
52	HUN	Zsuzsanna Nagy / Mate Fejes	752	2011/2012 season (100%)	156	0	0	250	182
52	HUN	Zsuzsanna Nagy / Mate Fejes	752	2010/2011 season (100%)	0	0	0	164	0
52	HUN	Zsuzsanna Nagy / Mate Fejes	752	2009/2010 season (70%)	0	0	0	0	0
53	AUT	Kira Geil / Tobias Eisenbauer	749	2011/2012 season (100%)	0	0	0	203	182
53	AUT	Kira Geil / Tobias Eisenbauer	749	2010/2011 season (100%)	0	0	0	182	182
53	AUT	Kira Geil / Tobias Eisenbauer	749	2009/2010 season (70%)	0	0	0	0	0
54	AUS	Danielle O'Brien / Gregory Merriman	724	2011/2012 season (100%)	362	0	0	0	0
54	AUS	Danielle O'Brien / Gregory Merriman	724	2010/2011 season (100%)	362	0	0	0	0
54	AUS	Danielle O'Brien / Gregory Merriman	724	2009/2010 season (70%)	228	0	0	0	0
55	RUS	Valeria Zenkova / Valerie Sinitsin	714	2011/2012 season (100%)	0	225	203	0	0
55	RUS	Valeria Zenkova / Valerie Sinitsin	714	2010/2011 season (100%)	0	182	0	0	0
55	RUS	Valeria Zenkova / Valerie Sinitsin	714	2009/2010 season (70%)	0	104	0	0	0
56	UKR	Siobhan Heekin-Canedy / Dmitri Dun	703	2011/2012 season (100%)	275	0	0	225	203
56	UKR	Siobhan Heekin-Canedy / Dmitri Dun	703	2010/2011 season (100%)	0	0	0	0	0
56	UKR	Siobhan Heekin-Canedy / Dmitri Dun	703	2009/2010 season (70%)	0	0	0	0	0
57	SVK	Nikola Visnova / Lukáš Csölley	695	2011/2012 season (100%)	0	0	0	0	0
57	SVK	Nikola Visnova / Lukáš Csölley	695	2010/2011 season (100%)	328	133	97	0	0
57	SVK	Nikola Visnova / Lukáš Csölley	695	2009/2010 season (70%)	53	84	0	0	0
58	RUS	Oksana Domnina / Maxim Shabalin	680	2011/2012 season (100%)	0	0	0	0	0
58	RUS	Oksana Domnina / Maxim Shabalin	680	2010/2011 season (100%)	0	0	0	0	0
58	RUS	Oksana Domnina / Maxim Shabalin	680	2009/2010 season (70%)	680	0	0	0	0
59	UZB	Anna Nagornyuk / Viktor Kovalenko	670	2011/2012 season (100%)	402	148	120	0	0
59	UZB	Anna Nagornyuk / Viktor Kovalenko	670	2010/2011 season (100%)	0	0	0	0	0
59	UZB	Anna Nagornyuk / Viktor Kovalenko	670	2009/2010 season (70%)	0	0	0	0	0
60	RUS	Ekaterina Rubleva / Ivan Shefer	647	2011/2012 season (100%)	0	0	0	0	0
60	RUS	Ekaterina Rubleva / Ivan Shefer	647	2010/2011 season (100%)	0	0	0	0	0
60	RUS	Ekaterina Rubleva / Ivan Shefer	647	2009/2010 season (70%)	237	227	183	0	0
61	RUS	Valeria Starygina / Ivan Volobuiev	639	2011/2012 season (100%)	0	0	0	250	225
61	RUS	Valeria Starygina / Ivan Volobuiev	639	2010/2011 season (100%)	0	0	0	164	0
61	RUS	Valeria Starygina / Ivan Volobuiev	639	2009/2010 season (70%)	0	0	0	0	0
62	GER	Shari Koch / Christian Nüchtern	579	2011/2012 season (100%)	215	182	182	0	0
62	GER	Shari Koch / Christian Nüchtern	579	2010/2011 season (100%)	0	0	0	0	0
62	GER	Shari Koch / Christian Nüchtern	579	2009/2010 season (70%)	0	0	0	0	0
63	CZE	Karolina Prochazkova / Michal Ceska	558	2011/2012 season (100%)	0	182	120	0	0
63	CZE	Karolina Prochazkova / Michal Ceska	558	2010/2011 season (100%)	0	148	108	0	0
63	CZE	Karolina Prochazkova / Michal Ceska	558	2009/2010 season (70%)	0	76	68	0	0
64	AUT	Barbora Silná / Juri Kurakin	553	2011/2012 season (100%)	0	0	0	225	164
64	AUT	Barbora Silná / Juri Kurakin	553	2010/2011 season (100%)	0	0	0	164	0
64	AUT	Barbora Silná / Juri Kurakin	553	2009/2010 season (70%)	0	0	0	0	0
65	CHN	Yiyi Zhang / Nan Wu	524	2011/2012 season (100%)	127	97	0	0	0
65	CHN	Yiyi Zhang / Nan Wu	524	2010/2011 season (100%)	0	148	0	0	0
65	CHN	Yiyi Zhang / Nan Wu	524	2009/2010 season (70%)	0	76	76	0	0
66	CZE	Lucie Myslivecková / Neil Brown	511	2011/2012 season (100%)	126	0	0	203	182
66	CZE	Lucie Myslivecková / Neil Brown	511	2010/2011 season (100%)	0	0	0	0	0
66	CZE	Lucie Myslivecková / Neil Brown	511	2009/2010 season (70%)	0	0	0	0	0
67	AUS	Maria Borounov / Evgeni Borounov	478	2011/2012 season (100%)	0	0	0	0	0
67	AUS	Maria Borounov / Evgeni Borounov	478	2010/2011 season (100%)	293	0	0	0	0
67	AUS	Maria Borounov / Evgeni Borounov	478	2009/2010 season (70%)	185	0	0	0	0
68	RUS	Jana Khokhlova / Fedor Andreev	450	2011/2012 season (100%)	0	0	0	0	0
68	RUS	Jana Khokhlova / Fedor Andreev	450	2010/2011 season (100%)	0	0	0	225	225
68	RUS	Jana Khokhlova / Fedor Andreev	450	2009/2010 season (70%)	0	0	0	0	0
69	UKR	Irina Babchenko / Vitali Nikiforov	439	2011/2012 season (100%)	0	0	0	182	164
69	UKR	Irina Babchenko / Vitali Nikiforov	439	2010/2011 season (100%)	0	0	0	0	0
69	UKR	Irina Babchenko / Vitali Nikiforov	439	2009/2010 season (70%)	0	93	0	0	0
70	USA	Rachel Tibbetts / Collin Brubaker	437	2011/2012 season (100%)	0	0	0	0	0
70	USA	Rachel Tibbetts / Collin Brubaker	437	2010/2011 season (100%)	0	0	0	0	0
70	USA	Rachel Tibbetts / Collin Brubaker	437	2009/2010 season (70%)	186	158	93	0	0
70	HUN	Dora Turoczi / Balazs Major	437	2011/2012 season (100%)	0	0	0	0	0
70	HUN	Dora Turoczi / Balazs Major	437	2010/2011 season (100%)	0	191	0	0	0
70	HUN	Dora Turoczi / Balazs Major	437	2009/2010 season (70%)	110	68	68	0	0
72	CAN	Victoria Hasegawa / Connor Hasegawa	425	2011/2012 season (100%)	0	164	164	0	0
72	CAN	Victoria Hasegawa / Connor Hasegawa	425	2010/2011 season (100%)	0	97	0	0	0
72	CAN	Victoria Hasegawa / Connor Hasegawa	425	2009/2010 season (70%)	0	0	0	0	0
73	UKR	Lolita Yermak / Alexander Liubchenko	414	2011/2012 season (100%)	0	148	133	0	0
73	UKR	Lolita Yermak / Alexander Liubchenko	414	2010/2011 season (100%)	0	133	0	0	0
73	UKR	Lolita Yermak / Alexander Liubchenko	414	2009/2010 season (70%)	0	0	0	0	0
74	CAN	Andreanne Poulin / Marc-Andre Servant	398	2011/2012 season (100%)	68	148	0	0	0
74	CAN	Andreanne Poulin / Marc-Andre Servant	398	2010/2011 season (100%)	0	182	0	0	0
74	CAN	Andreanne Poulin / Marc-Andre Servant	398	2009/2010 season (70%)	0	0	0	0	0
75	LAT	Ksenia Pecherkina / Aleksandrs Jakushin	394	2011/2012 season (100%)	141	133	120	0	0
75	LAT	Ksenia Pecherkina / Aleksandrs Jakushin	394	2010/2011 season (100%)	0	0	0	0	0
75	LAT	Ksenia Pecherkina / Aleksandrs Jakushin	394	2009/2010 season (70%)	0	0	0	0	0
76	FRA	Zoe Blanc / Pierre-Loup Bouquet	392	2011/2012 season (100%)	0	0	0	0	0
76	FRA	Zoe Blanc / Pierre-Loup Bouquet	392	2010/2011 season (100%)	0	0	0	0	0
76	FRA	Zoe Blanc / Pierre-Loup Bouquet	392	2009/2010 season (70%)	150	0	0	127	115
77	CZE	Kamila Hajkova / David Vincour	371	2011/2012 season (100%)	0	0	0	0	0
77	CZE	Kamila Hajkova / David Vincour	371	2010/2011 season (100%)	0	0	0	0	0
77	CZE	Kamila Hajkova / David Vincour	371	2009/2010 season (70%)	102	0	0	142	127
78	CAN	Mackenzie Bent / Garrett MacKeen	367	2011/2012 season (100%)	0	203	164	0	0
78	CAN	Mackenzie Bent / Garrett MacKeen	367	2010/2011 season (100%)	0	0	0	0	0
78	CAN	Mackenzie Bent / Garrett MacKeen	367	2009/2010 season (70%)	0	0	0	0	0
79	FIN	Sara Aghai / Jussiville Partanen	359	2011/2012 season (100%)	103	148	108	0	0
79	FIN	Sara Aghai / Jussiville Partanen	359	2010/2011 season (100%)	0	0	0	0	0
79	FIN	Sara Aghai / Jussiville Partanen	359	2009/2010 season (70%)	0	0	0	0	0
80	TUR	Alisa Agafonova / Alper Uçar	346	2011/2012 season (100%)	0	0	0	182	0
80	TUR	Alisa Agafonova / Alper Uçar	346	2010/2011 season (100%)	0	0	0	164	0
80	TUR	Alisa Agafonova / Alper Uçar	346	2009/2010 season (70%)	0	0	0	0	0
80	POL	Natalia Kaliszek / Michal Kaliszek	346	2011/2012 season (100%)	0	0	0	182	164
80	POL	Natalia Kaliszek / Michal Kaliszek	346	2010/2011 season (100%)	0	0	0	0	0
80	POL	Natalia Kaliszek / Michal Kaliszek	346	2009/2010 season (70%)	0	0	0	0	0
82	RUS	Anastasia Platonova / Alexander Grachev	341	2011/2012 season (100%)	0	0	0	0	0
82	RUS	Anastasia Platonova / Alexander Grachev	341	2010/2011 season (100%)	0	0	0	0	0
82	RUS	Anastasia Platonova / Alexander Grachev	341	2009/2010 season (70%)	0	183	0	158	0
83	MEX	Corenne Bruhns / Ryan Van Natten	325	2011/2012 season (100%)	325	0	0	0	0
83	MEX	Corenne Bruhns / Ryan Van Natten	325	2010/2011 season (100%)	0	0	0	0	0
83	MEX	Corenne Bruhns / Ryan Van Natten	325	2009/2010 season (70%)	0	0	0	0	0
84	RUS	Valeria Loseva / Denis Lunin	315	2011/2012 season (100%)	0	182	0	0	0
84	RUS	Valeria Loseva / Denis Lunin	315	2010/2011 season (100%)	0	133	0	0	0
84	RUS	Valeria Loseva / Denis Lunin	315	2009/2010 season (70%)	0	0	0	0	0
85	GER	Dominique Dieck / Michael Zenkner	307	2011/2012 season (100%)	0	0	0	0	0
85	GER	Dominique Dieck / Michael Zenkner	307	2010/2011 season (100%)	103	120	0	0	0
85	GER	Dominique Dieck / Michael Zenkner	307	2009/2010 season (70%)	0	84	0	0	0
86	BLR	Viktoria Kavaliova / Yurii Bieliaiev	303	2011/2012 season (100%)	75	120	0	0	0
86	BLR	Viktoria Kavaliova / Yurii Bieliaiev	303	2010/2011 season (100%)	0	108	0	0	0
86	BLR	Viktoria Kavaliova / Yurii Bieliaiev	303	2009/2010 season (70%)	0	0	0	0	0
87	USA	Kaitlin Hawayek / Michael Bramante	302	2011/2012 season (100%)	0	182	120	0	0
87	USA	Kaitlin Hawayek / Michael Bramante	302	2010/2011 season (100%)	0	0	0	0	0
87	USA	Kaitlin Hawayek / Michael Bramante	302	2009/2010 season (70%)	0	0	0	0	0
88	EST	Caitlin Mallory / Kristjan Rand	300	2011/2012 season (100%)	0	0	0	0	0
88	EST	Caitlin Mallory / Kristjan Rand	300	2010/2011 season (100%)	0	0	0	0	0
88	EST	Caitlin Mallory / Kristjan Rand	300	2009/2010 season (70%)	166	134	0	0	0
89	KAZ	Cortney Mansour / Daryn Zhunussov	293	2011/2012 season (100%)	293	0	0	0	0
89	KAZ	Cortney Mansour / Daryn Zhunussov	293	2010/2011 season (100%)	0	0	0	0	0
89	KAZ	Cortney Mansour / Daryn Zhunussov	293	2009/2010 season (70%)	0	0	0	0	0
90	GBR	Charlotte Aiken / Josh Whidborne	271	2011/2012 season (100%)	0	0	0	0	0
90	GBR	Charlotte Aiken / Josh Whidborne	271	2010/2011 season (100%)	83	108	0	0	0
90	GBR	Charlotte Aiken / Josh Whidborne	271	2009/2010 season (70%)	80	0	0	0	0
91	GBR	Christina Chitwood / Mark Hanretty	269	2011/2012 season (100%)	0	0	0	0	0
91	GBR	Christina Chitwood / Mark Hanretty	269	2010/2011 season (100%)	0	0	0	0	0
91	GBR	Christina Chitwood / Mark Hanretty	269	2009/2010 season (70%)	0	0	0	142	127
92	USA	Anastasia Olson / Jordan Cowan	268	2011/2012 season (100%)	0	0	0	0	0
92	USA	Anastasia Olson / Jordan Cowan	268	2010/2011 season (100%)	0	148	120	0	0
92	USA	Anastasia Olson / Jordan Cowan	268	2009/2010 season (70%)	0	0	0	0	0
93	USA	Joylyn Yang / Jean-Luc Baker	230	2011/2012 season (100%)	0	0	0	0	0
93	USA	Joylyn Yang / Jean-Luc Baker	230	2010/2011 season (100%)	0	133	97	0	0
93	USA	Joylyn Yang / Jean-Luc Baker	230	2009/2010 season (70%)	0	0	0	0	0
94	FRA	Estelle Elizabeth / Romain Le Gac	228	2011/2012 season (100%)	0	120	108	0	0
94	FRA	Estelle Elizabeth / Romain Le Gac	228	2010/2011 season (100%)	0	0	0	0	0
94	FRA	Estelle Elizabeth / Romain Le Gac	228	2009/2010 season (70%)	0	0	0	0	0
95	KAZ	Karina Uzurova / Ilias Ali	226	2011/2012 season (100%)	0	133	0	0	0
95	KAZ	Karina Uzurova / Ilias Ali	226	2010/2011 season (100%)	93	0	0	0	0
95	KAZ	Karina Uzurova / Ilias Ali	226	2009/2010 season (70%)	0	0	0	0	0
96	USA	Rachel Parsons / Michael Parsons	222	2011/2012 season (100%)	114	108	0	0	0
96	USA	Rachel Parsons / Michael Parsons	222	2010/2011 season (100%)	0	0	0	0	0
96	USA	Rachel Parsons / Michael Parsons	222	2009/2010 season (70%)	0	0	0	0	0
97	CAN	Sarah Arnold / Justin Trojek	213	2011/2012 season (100%)	0	0	0	0	0
97	CAN	Sarah Arnold / Justin Trojek	213	2010/2011 season (100%)	0	213	0	0	0
97	CAN	Sarah Arnold / Justin Trojek	213	2009/2010 season (70%)	0	0	0	0	0
97	CAN	Carolyn Maccuish / Tyler Morris	213	2011/2012 season (100%)	0	0	0	0	0
97	CAN	Carolyn Maccuish / Tyler Morris	213	2010/2011 season (100%)	0	120	0	0	0
97	CAN	Carolyn Maccuish / Tyler Morris	213	2009/2010 season (70%)	0	93	0	0	0
97	CAN	Tarrah Harvey / Keith Gagnon	213	2011/2012 season (100%)	0	213	0	0	0
97	CAN	Tarrah Harvey / Keith Gagnon	213	2010/2011 season (100%)	0	0	0	0	0
97	CAN	Tarrah Harvey / Keith Gagnon	213	2009/2010 season (70%)	0	0	0	0	0
100	FRA	Myriam Gassoumi / Clement Le Molaire	205	2011/2012 season (100%)	0	97	0	0	0
100	FRA	Myriam Gassoumi / Clement Le Molaire	205	2010/2011 season (100%)	0	108	0	0	0
100	FRA	Myriam Gassoumi / Clement Le Molaire	205	2009/2010 season (70%)	0	0	0	0	0
101	USA	Emily Samuelson / Todd Gilles	191	2011/2012 season (100%)	0	191	0	0	0
101	USA	Emily Samuelson / Todd Gilles	191	2010/2011 season (100%)	0	0	0	0	0
101	USA	Emily Samuelson / Todd Gilles	191	2009/2010 season (70%)	0	0	0	0	0
102	GBR	Sarah Coward / Michael Coward	165	2011/2012 season (100%)	0	0	0	0	0
102	GBR	Sarah Coward / Michael Coward	165	2010/2011 season (100%)	0	97	0	0	0
102	GBR	Sarah Coward / Michael Coward	165	2009/2010 season (70%)	0	68	0	0	0
103	CAN	Madeline Edwards / Zhao Kai Pang	164	2011/2012 season (100%)	0	164	0	0	0
103	CAN	Madeline Edwards / Zhao Kai Pang	164	2010/2011 season (100%)	0	0	0	0	0
103	CAN	Madeline Edwards / Zhao Kai Pang	164	2009/2010 season (70%)	0	0	0	0	0
103	USA	Madeline Heritage / Nathaniel Fast	164	2011/2012 season (100%)	0	164	0	0	0
103	USA	Madeline Heritage / Nathaniel Fast	164	2010/2011 season (100%)	0	0	0	0	0
103	USA	Madeline Heritage / Nathaniel Fast	164	2009/2010 season (70%)	0	0	0	0	0
103	RUS	Daria Morozova / Mikhail Zhirnov	164	2011/2012 season (100%)	0	164	0	0	0
103	RUS	Daria Morozova / Mikhail Zhirnov	164	2010/2011 season (100%)	0	0	0	0	0
103	RUS	Daria Morozova / Mikhail Zhirnov	164	2009/2010 season (70%)	0	0	0	0	0
106	POL	Justyna Plutowska / Dawid Pietrzynski	152	2011/2012 season (100%)	0	0	0	0	0
106	POL	Justyna Plutowska / Dawid Pietrzynski	152	2010/2011 season (100%)	0	0	0	0	0
106	POL	Justyna Plutowska / Dawid Pietrzynski	152	2009/2010 season (70%)	48	104	0	0	0
107	RUS	Maria Simonova / Dmitriy Dragun	148	2011/2012 season (100%)	0	148	0	0	0
107	RUS	Maria Simonova / Dmitriy Dragun	148	2010/2011 season (100%)	0	0	0	0	0
107	RUS	Maria Simonova / Dmitriy Dragun	148	2009/2010 season (70%)	0	0	0	0	0
107	CAN	Noa Bruser / Timothy Lum	148	2011/2012 season (100%)	0	148	0	0	0
107	CAN	Noa Bruser / Timothy Lum	148	2010/2011 season (100%)	0	0	0	0	0
107	CAN	Noa Bruser / Timothy Lum	148	2009/2010 season (70%)	0	0	0	0	0
109	DEN	Katelyn Good / Nikolaj Sørensen	141	2011/2012 season (100%)	0	0	0	0	0
109	DEN	Katelyn Good / Nikolaj Sørensen	141	2010/2011 season (100%)	0	0	0	0	0
109	DEN	Katelyn Good / Nikolaj Sørensen	141	2009/2010 season (70%)	65	76	0	0	0
110	CAN	Andrea Chong / Guillaume Gfeller	134	2011/2012 season (100%)	0	0	0	0	0
110	CAN	Andrea Chong / Guillaume Gfeller	134	2010/2011 season (100%)	0	0	0	0	0
110	CAN	Andrea Chong / Guillaume Gfeller	134	2009/2010 season (70%)	0	134	0	0	0
111	GER	Juliane Haslinger / Tom Finke	133	2011/2012 season (100%)	0	0	0	0	0
111	GER	Juliane Haslinger / Tom Finke	133	2010/2011 season (100%)	0	133	0	0	0
111	GER	Juliane Haslinger / Tom Finke	133	2009/2010 season (70%)	0	0	0	0	0
111	GBR	Sarah Coward / Avidan Brown	133	2011/2012 season (100%)	0	133	0	0	0
111	GBR	Sarah Coward / Avidan Brown	133	2010/2011 season (100%)	0	0	0	0	0
111	GBR	Sarah Coward / Avidan Brown	133	2009/2010 season (70%)	0	0	0	0	0
111	RUS	Sofia Evdokimova / Egor Bazin	133	2011/2012 season (100%)	0	133	0	0	0
111	RUS	Sofia Evdokimova / Egor Bazin	133	2010/2011 season (100%)	0	0	0	0	0
111	RUS	Sofia Evdokimova / Egor Bazin	133	2009/2010 season (70%)	0	0	0	0	0
111	UKR	Alexandra Nazarova / Maxim Nikitin	133	2011/2012 season (100%)	0	0	0	0	0
111	UKR	Alexandra Nazarova / Maxim Nikitin	133	2010/2011 season (100%)	0	133	0	0	0
111	UKR	Alexandra Nazarova / Maxim Nikitin	133	2009/2010 season (70%)	0	0	0	0	0
115	USA	Gabrielle Friedenberg / Ben Nykiel	120	2011/2012 season (100%)	0	0	0	0	0
115	USA	Gabrielle Friedenberg / Ben Nykiel	120	2010/2011 season (100%)	0	120	0	0	0
115	USA	Gabrielle Friedenberg / Ben Nykiel	120	2009/2010 season (70%)	0	0	0	0	0
115	SVK	Natalia Jancosek / Petr Seknicka	120	2011/2012 season (100%)	0	120	0	0	0
115	SVK	Natalia Jancosek / Petr Seknicka	120	2010/2011 season (100%)	0	0	0	0	0
115	SVK	Natalia Jancosek / Petr Seknicka	120	2009/2010 season (70%)	0	0	0	0	0
117	USA	Trina Pratt / Chris Obzansky	115	2011/2012 season (100%)	0	0	0	0	0
117	USA	Trina Pratt / Chris Obzansky	115	2010/2011 season (100%)	0	0	0	0	0
117	USA	Trina Pratt / Chris Obzansky	115	2009/2010 season (70%)	0	0	0	115	0
118	ISR	Brooke Elizabeth Frieling / Lionel Rumi	113	2011/2012 season (100%)	0	0	0	0	0
118	ISR	Brooke Elizabeth Frieling / Lionel Rumi	113	2010/2011 season (100%)	113	0	0	0	0
118	ISR	Brooke Elizabeth Frieling / Lionel Rumi	113	2009/2010 season (70%)	0	0	0	0	0
119	CAN	Caelen Dalmer / Shane Firus	108	2011/2012 season (100%)	0	108	0	0	0
119	CAN	Caelen Dalmer / Shane Firus	108	2010/2011 season (100%)	0	0	0	0	0
119	CAN	Caelen Dalmer / Shane Firus	108	2009/2010 season (70%)	0	0	0	0	0
119	NZL	Ayesha Yigit / Shane Speden	108	2011/2012 season (100%)	0	108	0	0	0
119	NZL	Ayesha Yigit / Shane Speden	108	2010/2011 season (100%)	0	0	0	0	0
119	NZL	Ayesha Yigit / Shane Speden	108	2009/2010 season (70%)	0	0	0	0	0
119	USA	Danielle Gamelin / Alexander Gamelin	108	2011/2012 season (100%)	0	108	0	0	0
119	USA	Danielle Gamelin / Alexander Gamelin	108	2010/2011 season (100%)	0	0	0	0	0
119	USA	Danielle Gamelin / Alexander Gamelin	108	2009/2010 season (70%)	0	0	0	0	0
119	CAN	Edrea Khong / Edbert Khong	108	2011/2012 season (100%)	0	0	0	0	0
119	CAN	Edrea Khong / Edbert Khong	108	2010/2011 season (100%)	0	108	0	0	0
119	CAN	Edrea Khong / Edbert Khong	108	2009/2010 season (70%)	0	0	0	0	0
119	ISR	Ekaterina Bugrov / Vasili Rogov	108	2011/2012 season (100%)	0	108	0	0	0
119	ISR	Ekaterina Bugrov / Vasili Rogov	108	2010/2011 season (100%)	0	0	0	0	0
119	ISR	Ekaterina Bugrov / Vasili Rogov	108	2009/2010 season (70%)	0	0	0	0	0
124	POL	Baily Carroll / Peter Gerber	97	2011/2012 season (100%)	0	0	0	0	0
124	POL	Baily Carroll / Peter Gerber	97	2010/2011 season (100%)	0	97	0	0	0
124	POL	Baily Carroll / Peter Gerber	97	2009/2010 season (70%)	0	0	0	0	0
124	FRA	Laura Boutary / Mahil Chantelauze	97	2011/2012 season (100%)	0	97	0	0	0
124	FRA	Laura Boutary / Mahil Chantelauze	97	2010/2011 season (100%)	0	0	0	0	0
124	FRA	Laura Boutary / Mahil Chantelauze	97	2009/2010 season (70%)	0	0	0	0	0
124	USA	Jessica Mancini / Tyler Brooks	97	2011/2012 season (100%)	0	97	0	0	0
124	USA	Jessica Mancini / Tyler Brooks	97	2010/2011 season (100%)	0	0	0	0	0
124	USA	Jessica Mancini / Tyler Brooks	97	2009/2010 season (70%)	0	0	0	0	0
124	FRA	Lindsay Pousset / Louis Thauron	97	2011/2012 season (100%)	0	97	0	0	0
124	FRA	Lindsay Pousset / Louis Thauron	97	2010/2011 season (100%)	0	0	0	0	0
124	FRA	Lindsay Pousset / Louis Thauron	97	2009/2010 season (70%)	0	0	0	0	0
124	FRA	Jessica Flemin / Jeremy Flemin	97	2011/2012 season (100%)	0	97	0	0	0
124	FRA	Jessica Flemin / Jeremy Flemin	97	2010/2011 season (100%)	0	0	0	0	0
124	FRA	Jessica Flemin / Jeremy Flemin	97	2009/2010 season (70%)	0	0	0	0	0
129	GBR	Olivia Smart / Joseph Buckland	93	2011/2012 season (100%)	93	0	0	0	0
129	GBR	Olivia Smart / Joseph Buckland	93	2010/2011 season (100%)	0	0	0	0	0
129	GBR	Olivia Smart / Joseph Buckland	93	2009/2010 season (70%)	0	0	0	0	0
130	TUR	Cagla Demirsal / Berk Akalin	83	2011/2012 season (100%)	83	0	0	0	0
130	TUR	Cagla Demirsal / Berk Akalin	83	2010/2011 season (100%)	0	0	0	0	0
130	TUR	Cagla Demirsal / Berk Akalin	83	2009/2010 season (70%)	0	0	0	0	0

== Season's World Ranking ==
The remainder of this section is a complete list, by discipline, published by the ISU.

=== Men's singles (124 skaters) ===
As of 9 April 2012

Rank	Nation	Skater	Points	Season	ISU Championships or Olympics	(Junior) Grand Prix and Final		Selected International Competition	
Rank	Nation	Skater	Points	Season	Best	Best	2nd Best	Best	2nd Best
1	CAN	Patrick Chan	2400	2011/2012 season (100%)	1200	800	400	0	0
2	JPN	Yuzuru Hanyu	2205	2011/2012 season (100%)	972	583	400	250	0
3	JPN	Daisuke Takahashi	2200	2011/2012 season (100%)	1080	720	400	0	0
4	CZE	Michal Brezina	1806	2011/2012 season (100%)	709	472	400	225	0
5	USA	Jeremy Abbott	1724	2011/2012 season (100%)	574	525	400	225	0
6	ESP	Javier Fernandez	1707	2011/2012 season (100%)	517	648	360	182	0
7	KAZ	Denis Ten	1637	2011/2012 season (100%)	638	262	262	250	225
8	ITA	Samuel Contesti	1401	2011/2012 season (100%)	465	292	191	250	203
9	RUS	Artur Gachinski	1280	2011/2012 season (100%)	756	262	262	0	0
10	USA	Ross Miner	1240	2011/2012 season (100%)	680	324	236	0	0
11	USA	Adam Rippon	1196	2011/2012 season (100%)	612	292	292	0	0
12	FRA	Brian Joubert	1125	2011/2012 season (100%)	875	0	0	250	0
13	JPN	Takahiko Kozuka	1102	2011/2012 season (100%)	418	360	324	0	0
14	CHN	Han Yan	1065	2011/2012 season (100%)	500	315	250	0	0
15	BEL	Kevin van der Perren	1051	2011/2012 season (100%)	275	360	191	225	0
16	FRA	Florent Amodio	1049	2011/2012 season (100%)	787	262	0	0	0
17	USA	Jason Brown	1005	2011/2012 season (100%)	405	350	250	0	0
18	CHN	Nan Song	989	2011/2012 season (100%)	305	360	324	0	0
19	USA	Joshua Farris	984	2011/2012 season (100%)	450	284	250	0	0
20	JPN	Takahito Mura	983	2011/2012 season (100%)	551	0	0	250	182
21	SWE	Alexander Majorov	961	2011/2012 season (100%)	293	236	0	250	182
22	JPN	Tatsuki Machida	909	2011/2012 season (100%)	446	213	0	250	0
23	GER	Martin Rappe	844	2011/2012 season (100%)	174	148	133	225	164
24	RUS	Evgeni Plushenko	840	2011/2012 season (100%)	840	0	0	0	0
25	BEL	Jorik Hendrickx	837	2011/2012 season (100%)	362	0	0	250	225
26	CZE	Tomáš Verner	813	2011/2012 season (100%)	551	262	0	0	0
27	UZB	Misha Ge	812	2011/2012 season (100%)	362	0	0	225	225
28	USA	Richard Dornbush	765	2011/2012 season (100%)	237	292	236	0	0
29	FRA	Chafik Besseghier	739	2011/2012 season (100%)	264	0	0	250	225
30	JPN	Daisuke Murakami	736	2011/2012 season (100%)	0	236	0	250	250
31	JPN	Keiji Tanaka	698	2011/2012 season (100%)	266	225	207	0	0
32	JPN	Ryuju Hino	695	2011/2012 season (100%)	215	250	230	0	0
33	CHN	He Zhang	684	2011/2012 season (100%)	295	225	164	0	0
34	MON	Kim Lucine	643	2011/2012 season (100%)	237	0	0	203	203
35	ROU	Zoltán Kelemen	642	2011/2012 season (100%)	214	0	0	225	203
36	RUS	Konstantin Menshov	630	2011/2012 season (100%)	0	236	191	203	0
37	CAN	Kevin Reynolds	615	2011/2012 season (100%)	402	213	0	0	0
38	GER	Peter Liebers	581	2011/2012 season (100%)	192	0	0	225	164
39	JPN	Shoma Uno	579	2011/2012 season (100%)	194	203	182	0	0
40	JPN	Nobunari Oda	573	2011/2012 season (100%)	0	360	213	0	0
41	KAZ	Abzal Rakimgaliev	572	2011/2012 season (100%)	140	0	0	250	182
42	AUT	Viktor Pfeifer	568	2011/2012 season (100%)	140	0	0	225	203
43	FRA	Romain Ponsart	558	2011/2012 season (100%)	0	191	0	203	164
44	USA	Timothy Dolensky	542	2011/2012 season (100%)	157	203	182	0	0
45	RUS	Sergei Voronov	538	2011/2012 season (100%)	325	213	0	0	0
46	RUS	Artur Dmitriev	534	2011/2012 season (100%)	127	225	182	0	0
47	RUS	Maxim Kovtun	505	2011/2012 season (100%)	0	255	250	0	0
48	ITA	Maurizio Zandron	503	2011/2012 season (100%)	68	133	120	182	0
49	KOR	June Hyoung Lee	468	2011/2012 season (100%)	83	203	182	0	0
50	PHI	Christopher Caluza	467	2011/2012 season (100%)	264	0	0	203	0
51	GER	Franz Streubel	453	2011/2012 season (100%)	0	0	0	250	203
51	USA	Stephen Carriere	453	2011/2012 season (100%)	0	0	0	250	203
53	CAN	Andrei Rogozine	449	2011/2012 season (100%)	0	236	213	0	0
54	CAN	Liam Firus	442	2011/2012 season (100%)	239	203	0	0	0
55	USA	Douglas Razzano	438	2011/2012 season (100%)	0	213	0	225	0
56	ITA	Paolo Bacchini	398	2011/2012 season (100%)	173	0	0	225	0
57	RUS	Ivan Bariev	385	2011/2012 season (100%)	0	0	0	203	182
57	JPN	Ryuichi Kihara	385	2011/2012 season (100%)	0	203	182	0	0
59	CHN	Jialiang Wu	364	2011/2012 season (100%)	173	191	0	0	0
60	USA	Shotaro Omori	346	2011/2012 season (100%)	0	182	164	0	0
61	CAN	Nam Nguyen	344	2011/2012 season (100%)	141	203	0	0	0
62	EST	Viktor Romanenkov	339	2011/2012 season (100%)	83	148	108	0	0
63	DEN	Justus Strid	338	2011/2012 season (100%)	113	0	0	225	0
64	FIN	Matthias Versluis	333	2011/2012 season (100%)	61	108	0	164	0
65	POL	Maciej Cieplucha	329	2011/2012 season (100%)	126	0	0	203	0
66	SWE	Adrian Schultheiss	328	2011/2012 season (100%)	0	0	0	164	164
66	KOR	Dong-Won Lee	328	2011/2012 season (100%)	0	164	164	0	0
66	SUI	Stephane Walker	328	2011/2012 season (100%)	0	0	0	164	164
66	RUS	Zhan Bush	328	2011/2012 season (100%)	328	0	0	0	0
70	CHN	Jinlin Guan	325	2011/2012 season (100%)	325	0	0	0	0
71	USA	Philip Warren	296	2011/2012 season (100%)	0	148	148	0	0
72	FIN	Viktor Zubik	290	2011/2012 season (100%)	0	108	0	182	0
73	GER	Paul Fentz	289	2011/2012 season (100%)	156	133	0	0	0
74	ESP	Javier Raya	270	2011/2012 season (100%)	106	0	0	164	0
75	USA	Keegan Messing	250	2011/2012 season (100%)	0	0	0	250	0
76	JPN	Sei Kawahara	245	2011/2012 season (100%)	0	148	97	0	0
77	UKR	Yakov Godorozha	240	2011/2012 season (100%)	0	120	120	0	0
78	BRA	Luiz Manella	236	2011/2012 season (100%)	103	133	0	0	0
79	PHI	Michael Christian Martinez	234	2011/2012 season (100%)	114	120	0	0	0
80	RUS	Gordei Gorshkov	225	2011/2012 season (100%)	0	225	0	0	0
81	BLR	Pavel Ignatenko	217	2011/2012 season (100%)	0	120	97	0	0
81	UKR	Stanislav Pertsov	217	2011/2012 season (100%)	0	120	97	0	0
83	CAN	Jeremy Ten	214	2011/2012 season (100%)	214	0	0	0	0
84	CZE	Petr Coufal	213	2011/2012 season (100%)	93	120	0	0	0
85	FIN	Julian Lagus	203	2011/2012 season (100%)	0	0	0	203	0
85	JPN	Kento Nakamura	203	2011/2012 season (100%)	0	0	0	203	0
87	KOR	Min-Seok Kim	192	2011/2012 season (100%)	192	0	0	0	0
88	USA	Armin Mahbanoozadeh	191	2011/2012 season (100%)	0	191	0	0	0
89	RUS	Artem Borodulin	182	2011/2012 season (100%)	0	0	0	182	0
89	GER	Denis Wieczorek	182	2011/2012 season (100%)	0	0	0	182	0
89	USA	Jonathan Cassar	182	2011/2012 season (100%)	0	0	0	182	0
89	SUI	Mikael Redin	182	2011/2012 season (100%)	0	0	0	182	0
89	RUS	Mikhail Kolyada	182	2011/2012 season (100%)	0	182	0	0	0
94	USA	David Wang	164	2011/2012 season (100%)	0	164	0	0	0
94	USA	Grant Hochstein	164	2011/2012 season (100%)	0	0	0	164	0
94	USA	Jay Yostanto	164	2011/2012 season (100%)	0	164	0	0	0
94	CHN	Jiaxing Liu	164	2011/2012 season (100%)	0	164	0	0	0
94	USA	Max Aaron	164	2011/2012 season (100%)	0	0	0	164	0
94	CZE	Pavel Kaska	164	2011/2012 season (100%)	0	0	0	164	0
94	ARM	Slavik Hayrapetyan	164	2011/2012 season (100%)	0	0	0	164	0
101	KOR	Alex Kang Chan Kam	156	2011/2012 season (100%)	156	0	0	0	0
102	USA	Harrison Choate	148	2011/2012 season (100%)	0	148	0	0	0
102	RUS	Vladislav Tarasenko	148	2011/2012 season (100%)	0	148	0	0	0
104	CAN	Mitchell Gordon	133	2011/2012 season (100%)	0	133	0	0	0
104	CAN	Samuel Angers	133	2011/2012 season (100%)	0	133	0	0	0
104	JPN	Yoji Tsuboi	133	2011/2012 season (100%)	0	133	0	0	0
107	AUS	Brendan Kerry	126	2011/2012 season (100%)	126	0	0	0	0
108	AUS	Mark Webster	113	2011/2012 season (100%)	113	0	0	0	0
109	GER	Christopher Berneck	108	2011/2012 season (100%)	0	108	0	0	0
109	GER	Niko Ulanovsky	108	2011/2012 season (100%)	0	108	0	0	0
109	SUI	Noah Scherer	108	2011/2012 season (100%)	0	108	0	0	0
109	CAN	Peter O Brien	108	2011/2012 season (100%)	0	108	0	0	0
113	UKR	Dmitri Ignatenko	102	2011/2012 season (100%)	102	0	0	0	0
113	TPE	Jordan Ju	102	2011/2012 season (100%)	102	0	0	0	0
115	FRA	Charles Tetar	97	2011/2012 season (100%)	0	97	0	0	0
115	CAN	Christophe Belley-Lemelin	97	2011/2012 season (100%)	0	97	0	0	0
115	FRA	Simon Hocquaux	97	2011/2012 season (100%)	0	97	0	0	0
115	FRA	Thomas Sosniak	97	2011/2012 season (100%)	0	97	0	0	0
119	ISR	Alexei Bychenko	92	2011/2012 season (100%)	92	0	0	0	0
120	BRA	Kevin Alves	83	2011/2012 season (100%)	83	0	0	0	0
121	GBR	Harry Mattick	75	2011/2012 season (100%)	75	0	0	0	0
122	AUS	Nicholas Fernandez	74	2011/2012 season (100%)	74	0	0	0	0
123	TPE	Chih-I Tsao	49	2011/2012 season (100%)	49	0	0	0	0
124	SWE	Marcus Björk	44	2011/2012 season (100%)	44	0	0	0	0

=== Ladies' singles (126 skaters) ===
As of 9 April 2012

Rank	Nation	Skater	Points	Season	ISU Championships or Olympics	(Junior) Grand Prix and Final		Selected International Competition	
Rank	Nation	Skater	Points	Season	Best	Best	2nd Best	Best	2nd Best
1	ITA	Carolina Kostner	2650	2011/2012 season (100%)	1200	800	400	250	0
2	JPN	Akiko Suzuki	2092	2011/2012 season (100%)	972	720	400	0	0
3	RUS	Alena Leonova	2088	2011/2012 season (100%)	1080	648	360	0	0
4	SWE	Viktoria Helgesson	1569	2011/2012 season (100%)	551	324	262	250	182
5	JPN	Mao Asada	1516	2011/2012 season (100%)	756	400	360	0	0
6	USA	Ashley Wagner	1491	2011/2012 season (100%)	875	324	292	0	0
7	GEO	Elene Gedevanishvili	1380	2011/2012 season (100%)	680	262	213	225	0
8	JPN	Kanako Murakami	1315	2011/2012 season (100%)	787	292	236	0	0
9	RUS	Adelina Sotnikova	1303	2011/2012 season (100%)	405	324	324	250	0
10	USA	Alissa Czisny	1259	2011/2012 season (100%)	131	525	400	203	0
11	FIN	Kiira Korpi	1254	2011/2012 season (100%)	756	262	236	0	0
12	USA	Caroline Zhang	1166	2011/2012 season (100%)	680	236	0	250	0
13	FRA	Maé-Bérénice Méité	1139	2011/2012 season (100%)	237	236	213	250	203
14	RUS	Polina Korobeynikova	1121	2011/2012 season (100%)	612	284	225	0	0
15	RUS	Yulia Lipnitskaya	1100	2011/2012 season (100%)	500	350	250	0	0
16	CHN	Zijun Li	1058	2011/2012 season (100%)	328	255	225	250	0
17	RUS	Ksenia Makarova	992	2011/2012 season (100%)	517	262	213	0	0
18	RUS	Elizaveta Tuktamysheva	983	2011/2012 season (100%)	0	583	400	0	0
19	CHN	Kexin Zhang	930	2011/2012 season (100%)	638	292	0	0	0
20	USA	Agnes Zawadzki	900	2011/2012 season (100%)	496	213	191	0	0
21	JPN	Haruka Imai	890	2011/2012 season (100%)	362	292	236	0	0
22	CAN	Amelie Lacoste	873	2011/2012 season (100%)	446	236	191	0	0
23	USA	Mirai Nagasu	872	2011/2012 season (100%)	0	360	262	250	0
24	RUS	Polina Shelepen	860	2011/2012 season (100%)	295	315	250	0	0
25	UKR	Natalia Popova	847	2011/2012 season (100%)	264	133	0	225	225
26	EST	Elena Glebova	839	2011/2012 season (100%)	339	0	0	250	250
27	ITA	Valentina Marchei	799	2011/2012 season (100%)	574	0	0	225	0
28	GER	Sarah Hecken	785	2011/2012 season (100%)	162	191	0	250	182
29	JPN	Satoko Miyahara	754	2011/2012 season (100%)	365	225	164	0	0
30	SWE	Joshi Helgesson	753	2011/2012 season (100%)	325	0	0	225	203
31	EST	Gerli Liinamäe	716	2011/2012 season (100%)	127	182	182	225	0
32	USA	Gracie Gold	700	2011/2012 season (100%)	450	250	0	0	0
33	FRA	Lenaelle Gilleron-Gorry	668	2011/2012 season (100%)	0	120	120	225	203
34	CHN	Bingwa Geng	666	2011/2012 season (100%)	293	191	0	182	0
35	RUS	Polina Agafonova	656	2011/2012 season (100%)	0	203	203	250	0
36	ESP	Sonia Lafuente	652	2011/2012 season (100%)	275	213	0	164	0
37	GBR	Jenna McCorkell	651	2011/2012 season (100%)	305	0	0	182	164
38	SWE	Isabelle Olsson	634	2011/2012 season (100%)	0	120	108	203	203
39	USA	Vanessa Lam	621	2011/2012 season (100%)	141	250	230	0	0
40	CAN	Cynthia Phaneuf	615	2011/2012 season (100%)	402	213	0	0	0
41	KOR	Hae-Jin Kim	606	2011/2012 season (100%)	239	203	164	0	0
42	SVK	Monika Simancikova	601	2011/2012 season (100%)	214	108	97	182	0
43	FIN	Beata Papp	594	2011/2012 season (100%)	0	133	97	182	182
44	JPN	Yuki Nishino	571	2011/2012 season (100%)	0	182	164	225	0
45	FRA	Yretha Silete	568	2011/2012 season (100%)	377	191	0	0	0
46	RUS	Sofia Biryukova	542	2011/2012 season (100%)	0	292	0	250	0
47	RUS	Kristina Zaseeva	540	2011/2012 season (100%)	0	133	0	225	182
48	USA	Christina Gao	528	2011/2012 season (100%)	266	262	0	0	0
49	JPN	Miu Sato	521	2011/2012 season (100%)	157	182	182	0	0
50	JPN	Risa Shoji	518	2011/2012 season (100%)	68	225	225	0	0
51	SLO	Patricia Glešcic	507	2011/2012 season (100%)	93	0	0	250	164
52	ITA	Francesca Rio	490	2011/2012 season (100%)	83	0	0	225	182
53	AUT	Kerstin Frank	474	2011/2012 season (100%)	146	0	0	164	164
54	FIN	Juulia Turkkila	450	2011/2012 season (100%)	200	0	0	250	0
55	SLO	Dasa Grm	414	2011/2012 season (100%)	0	0	0	250	164
56	USA	Samantha Cesario	406	2011/2012 season (100%)	0	203	203	0	0
57	FRA	Lena Marrocco	385	2011/2012 season (100%)	0	0	0	203	182
58	JPN	Haruna Suzuki	373	2011/2012 season (100%)	0	148	0	225	0
59	BEL	Kaat Van Daele	364	2011/2012 season (100%)	0	0	0	182	182
59	JPN	Shion Kokubun	364	2011/2012 season (100%)	0	0	0	182	182
61	RUS	Anna Shershak	358	2011/2012 season (100%)	0	225	133	0	0
62	GER	Nathalie Weinzierl	342	2011/2012 season (100%)	92	0	0	250	0
63	JPN	Kako Tomotaki	336	2011/2012 season (100%)	0	133	0	203	0
64	KOR	So Youn Park	330	2011/2012 season (100%)	0	182	148	0	0
65	BEL	Isabelle Pieman	329	2011/2012 season (100%)	126	0	0	203	0
66	KOR	Min-Jeong Kwak	325	2011/2012 season (100%)	325	0	0	0	0
67	CHN	Ziquan Zhao	322	2011/2012 season (100%)	174	148	0	0	0
68	USA	Ashley Cain	312	2011/2012 season (100%)	0	164	148	0	0
69	FIN	Alisa Mikonsaari	309	2011/2012 season (100%)	106	0	0	203	0
70	CAN	Kate Charbonneau	297	2011/2012 season (100%)	0	164	133	0	0
71	LAT	Alina Fjodorova	281	2011/2012 season (100%)	173	108	0	0	0
72	AUT	Sabrina Schulz	269	2011/2012 season (100%)	44	0	0	225	0
73	KOR	Chae-Yeon Suhr	266	2011/2012 season (100%)	102	0	0	164	0
74	PUR	Victoria Muniz	264	2011/2012 season (100%)	264	0	0	0	0
75	USA	Courtney Hicks	250	2011/2012 season (100%)	0	250	0	0	0
76	FRA	Anais Ventard	240	2011/2012 season (100%)	0	120	120	0	0
77	CAN	Alexandra Najarro	237	2011/2012 season (100%)	237	0	0	0	0
78	LUX	Fleur Maxwell	225	2011/2012 season (100%)	0	0	0	225	0
78	ITA	Roberta Rodeghiero	225	2011/2012 season (100%)	0	0	0	225	0
78	JPN	Shoko Ishikawa	225	2011/2012 season (100%)	0	0	0	225	0
81	TPE	Melinda Wang	214	2011/2012 season (100%)	214	0	0	0	0
82	RUS	Anna Ovcharova	203	2011/2012 season (100%)	0	0	0	203	0
82	USA	Hannah Miller	203	2011/2012 season (100%)	0	203	0	0	0
82	JPN	Kana Muramoto	203	2011/2012 season (100%)	0	0	0	203	0
82	SWE	Linnea Mellgren	203	2011/2012 season (100%)	0	0	0	203	0
82	RUS	Maria Artemieva	203	2011/2012 season (100%)	0	0	0	203	0
82	SLO	Nika Ceric	203	2011/2012 season (100%)	0	0	0	203	0
88	CAN	Kaetlyn Osmond	194	2011/2012 season (100%)	194	0	0	0	0
89	THA	Sandra Khopon	192	2011/2012 season (100%)	192	0	0	0	0
90	USA	Joelle Forte	191	2011/2012 season (100%)	0	191	0	0	0
91	CRO	Mirna Libric	182	2011/2012 season (100%)	0	0	0	182	0
92	CHN	Qiuying Zhu	173	2011/2012 season (100%)	173	0	0	0	0
93	NOR	Anine Rabe	164	2011/2012 season (100%)	0	0	0	164	0
93	EST	Jasmine Alexandra Costa	164	2011/2012 season (100%)	0	0	0	164	0
93	USA	Katarina Kulgeyko	164	2011/2012 season (100%)	0	164	0	0	0
93	GER	Katharina Zientek	164	2011/2012 season (100%)	0	0	0	164	0
93	NED	Larissa Van Der Linden	164	2011/2012 season (100%)	0	0	0	164	0
93	FIN	Minna Parviainen	164	2011/2012 season (100%)	0	0	0	164	0
93	USA	Yasmin Siraj	164	2011/2012 season (100%)	0	164	0	0	0
100	AUS	Chantelle Kerry	156	2011/2012 season (100%)	156	0	0	0	0
101	USA	Lauren Dinh	148	2011/2012 season (100%)	0	148	0	0	0
101	RUS	Maria Stavitskaia	148	2011/2012 season (100%)	0	148	0	0	0
101	JPN	Yukiko Fujisawa	148	2011/2012 season (100%)	0	148	0	0	0
104	SUI	Tina Stuerzinger	146	2011/2012 season (100%)	49	97	0	0	0
105	THA	Mimi Tanasorn Chindasook	140	2011/2012 season (100%)	140	0	0	0	0
106	JPN	Miyabi Oba	133	2011/2012 season (100%)	0	133	0	0	0
107	KOR	Yea-Ji Yun	126	2011/2012 season (100%)	126	0	0	0	0
108	DEN	Anita Madsen	120	2011/2012 season (100%)	0	120	0	0	0
108	AUS	Brooklee Han	120	2011/2012 season (100%)	0	120	0	0	0
110	SUI	Romy Bühler	118	2011/2012 season (100%)	118	0	0	0	0
111	THA	Melanie Swang	113	2011/2012 season (100%)	113	0	0	0	0
112	POL	Alexandra Kamieniecki	108	2011/2012 season (100%)	0	108	0	0	0
112	SWE	Josefine Taljegard	108	2011/2012 season (100%)	0	108	0	0	0
112	CAN	Natasha Purich	108	2011/2012 season (100%)	0	108	0	0	0
112	AUT	Victoria Huebler	108	2011/2012 season (100%)	0	108	0	0	0
116	BRA	Isadora Williams	103	2011/2012 season (100%)	103	0	0	0	0
117	SUI	Myriam Leuenberger	102	2011/2012 season (100%)	102	0	0	0	0
118	RUS	Alexandra Deeva	97	2011/2012 season (100%)	0	97	0	0	0
118	FRA	Laurine Lecavelier	97	2011/2012 season (100%)	0	97	0	0	0
118	USA	McKinzie Daniels	97	2011/2012 season (100%)	0	97	0	0	0
118	JPN	Saya Ueno	97	2011/2012 season (100%)	0	97	0	0	0
122	RSA	Lejeanne Marais	92	2011/2012 season (100%)	92	0	0	0	0
123	ITA	Carol Bressanutti	83	2011/2012 season (100%)	83	0	0	0	0
123	TPE	Crystal Kiang	83	2011/2012 season (100%)	83	0	0	0	0
125	DEN	Karina Johnson	74	2011/2012 season (100%)	74	0	0	0	0
125	PHI	Zhaira Costiniano	74	2011/2012 season (100%)	74	0	0	0	0

=== Pairs (73 couples) ===
As of 30 March 2012

Rank	Nation	Couple	Points	Season	ISU Championships or Olympics	(Junior) Grand Prix and Final		Selected International Competition	
Rank	Nation	Couple	Points	Season	Best	Best	2nd Best	Best	2nd Best
1	RUS	Tatiana Volosozhar / Maxim Trankov	2700	2011/2012 season (100%)	1080	720	400	250	250
2	GER	Aliona Savchenko / Robin Szolkowy	2400	2011/2012 season (100%)	1200	800	400	0	0
3	JPN	Narumi Takahashi / Mervin Tran	1804	2011/2012 season (100%)	972	472	360	0	0
4	ITA	Stefania Berton / Ondrej Hotárek	1703	2011/2012 season (100%)	612	324	292	250	225
5	RUS	Yuko Kavaguti / Alexander Smirnov	1686	2011/2012 season (100%)	638	648	400	0	0
6	CAN	Meagan Duhamel / Eric Radford	1636	2011/2012 season (100%)	787	525	324	0	0
7	RUS	Vera Bazarova / Yuri Larionov	1603	2011/2012 season (100%)	756	360	262	225	0
8	CHN	Wenjing Sui / Cong Han	1550	2011/2012 season (100%)	840	360	350	0	0
9	USA	Caydee Denney / John Coughlin	1513	2011/2012 season (100%)	756	292	262	203	0
10	RUS	Ksenia Stolbova / Fedor Klimov	1185	2011/2012 season (100%)	680	292	213	0	0
11	USA	Mary Beth Marley / Rockne Brubaker	1096	2011/2012 season (100%)	680	213	0	203	0
12	USA	Amanda Evora / Mark Ladwig	1080	2011/2012 season (100%)	496	292	292	0	0
13	GER	Maylin Hausch / Daniel Wende	1069	2011/2012 season (100%)	446	191	0	250	182
14	GER	Mari Vartmann / Aaron Van Cleave	1026	2011/2012 season (100%)	551	0	0	250	225
15	FRA	Vanessa James / Morgan Ciprès	1015	2011/2012 season (100%)	496	191	0	164	164
16	CHN	Dan Zhang / Hao Zhang	943	2011/2012 season (100%)	0	583	360	0	0
17	CHN	Xiaoyu Yu / Yang Jin	916	2011/2012 season (100%)	450	236	230	0	0
18	CAN	Jessica Dube / Sebastien Wolfe	900	2011/2012 season (100%)	402	262	236	0	0
19	CHN	Qing Pang / Jian Tong	875	2011/2012 season (100%)	875	0	0	0	0
20	CAN	Katherine Bobak / Ian Beharry	831	2011/2012 season (100%)	266	315	250	0	0
21	CAN	Paige Lawrence / Rudi Swiegers	801	2011/2012 season (100%)	446	191	0	164	0
22	RUS	Ekaterina Petaikina / Maxim Kurdyukov	753	2011/2012 season (100%)	295	255	203	0	0
23	USA	Britney Simpson / Matthew Blackmer	728	2011/2012 season (100%)	194	284	250	0	0
24	RUS	Katarina Gerboldt / Alexander Enbert	712	2011/2012 season (100%)	0	262	0	225	225
25	RUS	Lubov Iliushechkina / Nodari Maisuradze	701	2011/2012 season (100%)	0	262	236	203	0
26	ISR	Danielle Montalbano / Evgeni Krasnopolski	699	2011/2012 season (100%)	293	0	0	203	203
27	CAN	Kirsten Moore-Towers / Dylan Moscovitch	648	2011/2012 season (100%)	0	324	324	0	0
28	CAN	Margaret Purdy / Michael Marinaro	628	2011/2012 season (100%)	328	203	97	0	0
29	USA	Haven Denney / Brandon Frazier	618	2011/2012 season (100%)	365	133	120	0	0
30	FRA	Daria Popova / Bruno Massot	584	2011/2012 season (100%)	402	0	0	182	0
31	CHN	Huibo Dong / Yiming Wu	561	2011/2012 season (100%)	325	236	0	0	0
32	BLR	Lubov Bakirova / Mikalai Kamianchuk	550	2011/2012 season (100%)	325	0	0	225	0
33	USA	Kylie Duarte / Colin Grafton	495	2011/2012 season (100%)	239	148	108	0	0
34	CHN	Meiyi Li / Bo Jiang	494	2011/2012 season (100%)	215	182	97	0	0
35	ITA	Nicole Della Monica / Matteo Guarise	478	2011/2012 season (100%)	275	0	0	203	0
36	USA	Ashley Cain / Joshua Reagan	418	2011/2012 season (100%)	0	236	0	182	0
37	RUS	Tatiana Tudvaseva / Sergei Lisiev	410	2011/2012 season (100%)	0	207	203	0	0
38	POL	Magdalena Klatka / Radoslaw Chruscinski	407	2011/2012 season (100%)	141	133	133	0	0
39	RUS	Vasilisa Davankova / Andrei Deputat	405	2011/2012 season (100%)	405	0	0	0	0
40	USA	Marissa Castelli / Simon Shnapir	395	2011/2012 season (100%)	0	213	0	182	0
41	GER	Katharina Gierok / Florian Just	389	2011/2012 season (100%)	0	0	0	225	164
42	USA	Jessica Calalang / Zack Sidhu	385	2011/2012 season (100%)	0	203	182	0	0
42	EST	Natalja Zabijako / Sergei Kulbach	385	2011/2012 season (100%)	0	182	0	203	0
44	GBR	Stacey Kemp / David King	362	2011/2012 season (100%)	362	0	0	0	0
44	CHN	Yue Zhang / Lei Wang	362	2011/2012 season (100%)	362	0	0	0	0
46	AUT	Stina Martini / Severin Kiefer	356	2011/2012 season (100%)	192	0	0	164	0
47	CZE	Klara Kadlecova / Petr Bidar	355	2011/2012 season (100%)	0	191	164	0	0
47	GBR	Sally Hoolin / James Hunt	355	2011/2012 season (100%)	173	0	0	182	0
49	POL	Natalia Kaliszek / Michal Kaliszek	346	2011/2012 season (100%)	0	0	0	182	164
50	RUS	Valeria Grechukhina / Andrei Filonov	296	2011/2012 season (100%)	0	148	148	0	0
51	RUS	Ekaterina Krutskikh / Vladimir Morozov	268	2011/2012 season (100%)	0	148	120	0	0
52	ITA	Carolina Gillespie / Luca Dematte	264	2011/2012 season (100%)	264	0	0	0	0
53	RUS	Anastasia Martiusheva / Alexei Rogonov	250	2011/2012 season (100%)	0	0	0	250	0
53	USA	Andrea Poapst / Chris Knierim	250	2011/2012 season (100%)	0	0	0	250	0
55	CZE	Alexandra Herbrikova / Rudy Halmaert	237	2011/2012 season (100%)	237	0	0	0	0
56	USA	Tiffany Vise / Don Baldwin	236	2011/2012 season (100%)	0	236	0	0	0
57	UKR	Julia Lavrentieva / Yuri Rudik	235	2011/2012 season (100%)	127	108	0	0	0
58	BLR	Maria Paliakova / Mikhail Fomichev	228	2011/2012 season (100%)	0	120	108	0	0
59	SUI	Anaïs Morand / Timothy Leemann	214	2011/2012 season (100%)	214	0	0	0	0
60	CAN	Brittany Jones / Kurtis Gaskell	213	2011/2012 season (100%)	0	213	0	0	0
60	CAN	Taylor Steele / Robert Schultz	213	2011/2012 season (100%)	0	213	0	0	0
62	FRA	Camille Mendoza / Christopher Boyadji	200	2011/2012 season (100%)	103	97	0	0	0
63	CAN	Natasha Purich / Raymond Schultz	191	2011/2012 season (100%)	0	191	0	0	0
64	SWE	Ronja Roll / Gustav Forsgren	182	2011/2012 season (100%)	0	0	0	182	0
64	RUS	Tatiana Novik / Andrei Novoselov	182	2011/2012 season (100%)	0	0	0	182	0
66	RUS	Kamila Gainetdinova / Ivan Bich	174	2011/2012 season (100%)	174	0	0	0	0
67	RUS	Evgania Tarasova / Egor Chudin	164	2011/2012 season (100%)	0	0	0	164	0
67	RUS	Lina Fedorova / Maxim Miroshkin	164	2011/2012 season (100%)	0	164	0	0	0
67	USA	Madeline Aaron / Max Settlage	164	2011/2012 season (100%)	0	164	0	0	0
70	CAN	Hayleigh Bell / Alistair Sylvester	157	2011/2012 season (100%)	157	0	0	0	0
71	USA	Olivia Oltmanns / Joshua Santillan	133	2011/2012 season (100%)	0	133	0	0	0
72	RUS	Alexandra Vasilieva / Yuri Shevchuk	108	2011/2012 season (100%)	0	108	0	0	0
73	POL	Aleksandra Malinkiewicz / Sebastian Lofek	97	2011/2012 season (100%)	0	97	0	0	0

=== Ice dance (99 couples) ===
As of 31 March 2012

Rank	Nation	Couple	Points	Season	ISU Championships or Olympics	(Junior) Grand Prix and Final		Selected International Competition	
Rank	Nation	Couple	Points	Season	Best	Best	2nd Best	Best	2nd Best
1	CAN	Tessa Virtue / Scott Moir	2570	2011/2012 season (100%)	1200	720	400	250	0
2	USA	Meryl Davis / Charlie White	2280	2011/2012 season (100%)	1080	800	400	0	0
3	FRA	Nathalie Péchalat / Fabian Bourzat	1980	2011/2012 season (100%)	972	648	360	0	0
4	CAN	Kaitlyn Weaver / Andrew Poje	1818	2011/2012 season (100%)	875	583	360	0	0
5	USA	Maia Shibutani / Alex Shibutani	1762	2011/2012 season (100%)	612	525	400	225	0
6	RUS	Ekaterina Bobrova / Dmitri Soloviev	1628	2011/2012 season (100%)	756	472	400	0	0
7	GER	Nelli Zhiganshina / Alexander Gazsi	1502	2011/2012 season (100%)	418	292	292	250	250
8	RUS	Elena Ilinykh / Nikita Katsalapov	1403	2011/2012 season (100%)	787	324	292	0	0
9	ITA	Anna Cappellini / Luca Lanotte	1357	2011/2012 season (100%)	709	324	324	0	0
10	GBR	Penny Coomes / Nicholas Buckland	1263	2011/2012 season (100%)	496	292	0	250	225
11	FRA	Pernelle Carron / Lloyd Jones	1231	2011/2012 season (100%)	446	324	236	225	0
12	LTU	Isabella Tobias / Deividas Stagniūnas	1112	2011/2012 season (100%)	362	324	262	164	0
13	RUS	Ekaterina Riazanova / Ilia Tkachenko	1105	2011/2012 season (100%)	551	292	262	0	0
14	RUS	Victoria Sinitsina / Ruslan Zhiganshin	1100	2011/2012 season (100%)	500	350	250	0	0
15	USA	Madison Hubbell / Zachary Donohue	1037	2011/2012 season (100%)	551	236	0	250	0
16	RUS	Alexandra Stepanova / Ivan Bukin	984	2011/2012 season (100%)	450	284	250	0	0
17	RUS	Anna Yanovskaya / Sergey Mozgov	930	2011/2012 season (100%)	365	315	250	0	0
18	ITA	Lorenza Alessandrini / Simone Vaturi	898	2011/2012 season (100%)	247	262	0	225	164
19	USA	Alexandra Aldridge / Daniel Eaton	885	2011/2012 season (100%)	405	255	225	0	0
20	CHN	Xintong Huang / Xun Zheng	875	2011/2012 season (100%)	377	262	236	0	0
21	CAN	Kharis Ralph / Asher Hill	804	2011/2012 season (100%)	339	262	0	203	0
22	AZE	Julia Zlobina / Alexei Sitnikov	778	2011/2012 season (100%)	325	0	0	250	203
23	ITA	Charlene Guignard / Marco Fabbri	768	2011/2012 season (100%)	293	0	0	250	225
24	USA	Madison Chock / Evan Bates	757	2011/2012 season (100%)	0	292	262	203	0
25	GER	Tanja Kolbe / Stefano Caruso	717	2011/2012 season (100%)	264	0	0	250	203
26	UKR	Siobhan Heekin-Canedy / Dmitri Dun	703	2011/2012 season (100%)	275	0	0	225	203
27	UKR	Maria Nosulia / Evgen Kholoniuk	696	2011/2012 season (100%)	239	250	207	0	0
28	USA	Lauri Bonacorsi / Travis Mager	694	2011/2012 season (100%)	266	225	203	0	0
29	CAN	Nicole Orford / Thomas Williams	693	2011/2012 season (100%)	295	250	148	0	0
30	FRA	Gabriella Papadakis / Guillaume Cizeron	692	2011/2012 season (100%)	328	182	182	0	0
31	CAN	Alexandra Paul / Mitchell Islam	687	2011/2012 season (100%)	496	191	0	0	0
32	CHN	Xiaoyang Yu / Chen Wang	682	2011/2012 season (100%)	446	236	0	0	0
33	RUS	Ekaterina Pushkash / Jonathan Guerreiro	674	2011/2012 season (100%)	0	236	213	225	0
34	UZB	Anna Nagornyuk / Viktor Kovalenko	670	2011/2012 season (100%)	402	148	120	0	0
35	GBR	Louise Walden / Owen Edwards	604	2011/2012 season (100%)	237	0	0	203	164
36	HUN	Zsuzsanna Nagy / Mate Fejes	588	2011/2012 season (100%)	156	0	0	250	182
37	GER	Shari Koch / Christian Nüchtern	579	2011/2012 season (100%)	215	182	182	0	0
38	ESP	Sara Hurtado / Adria Diaz	574	2011/2012 season (100%)	180	191	0	203	0
39	EST	Irina Shtork / Taavi Rand	572	2011/2012 season (100%)	214	225	133	0	0
40	CZE	Gabriela Kubova / Dmitri Kiselev	529	2011/2012 season (100%)	140	0	0	225	164
41	CZE	Lucie Myslivecková / Neil Brown	511	2011/2012 season (100%)	126	0	0	203	182
42	ITA	Sofia Sforza / Francesco Fioretti	491	2011/2012 season (100%)	194	164	133	0	0
43	USA	Lynn Kriengkrairut / Logan Giulietti-Schmitt	486	2011/2012 season (100%)	0	236	0	250	0
44	RUS	Valeria Starygina / Ivan Volobuiev	475	2011/2012 season (100%)	0	0	0	250	225
45	UKR	Anastasia Galyeta / Alexei Shumski	455	2011/2012 season (100%)	0	230	225	0	0
46	USA	Isabella Cannuscio / Ian Lorello	438	2011/2012 season (100%)	0	213	0	225	0
47	RUS	Evgenia Kosigina / Nikolai Moroshkin	428	2011/2012 season (100%)	0	225	203	0	0
47	RUS	Valeria Zenkova / Valerie Sinitsin	428	2011/2012 season (100%)	0	225	203	0	0
49	GER	Carolina Hermann / Daniel Hermann	406	2011/2012 season (100%)	0	0	0	203	203
50	JPN	Cathy Reed / Chris Reed	395	2011/2012 season (100%)	0	213	0	182	0
51	LAT	Ksenia Pecherkina / Aleksandrs Jakushin	394	2011/2012 season (100%)	141	133	120	0	0
52	AUT	Barbora Silná / Juri Kurakin	389	2011/2012 season (100%)	0	0	0	225	164
53	AUT	Kira Geil / Tobias Eisenbauer	385	2011/2012 season (100%)	0	0	0	203	182
54	RUS	Kristina Gorshkova / Vitali Butikov	377	2011/2012 season (100%)	0	213	0	164	0
55	CAN	Mackenzie Bent / Garrett MacKeen	367	2011/2012 season (100%)	0	203	164	0	0
56	AUS	Danielle O'Brien / Gregory Merriman	362	2011/2012 season (100%)	362	0	0	0	0
57	FIN	Sara Aghai / Jussiville Partanen	359	2011/2012 season (100%)	103	148	108	0	0
58	UKR	Irina Babchenko / Vitali Nikiforov	346	2011/2012 season (100%)	0	0	0	182	164
58	POL	Natalia Kaliszek / Michal Kaliszek	346	2011/2012 season (100%)	0	0	0	182	164
58	SUI	Ramona Elsener / Florian Roost	346	2011/2012 season (100%)	0	0	0	182	164
61	CAN	Victoria Hasegawa / Connor Hasegawa	328	2011/2012 season (100%)	0	164	164	0	0
62	MEX	Corenne Bruhns / Ryan Van Natten	325	2011/2012 season (100%)	325	0	0	0	0
63	USA	Kaitlin Hawayek / Michael Bramante	302	2011/2012 season (100%)	0	182	120	0	0
63	CZE	Karolina Prochazkova / Michal Ceska	302	2011/2012 season (100%)	0	182	120	0	0
65	UKR	Nadezhda Frolenkova / Mikhail Kasalo	295	2011/2012 season (100%)	113	0	0	182	0
66	KAZ	Cortney Mansour / Daryn Zhunussov	293	2011/2012 season (100%)	293	0	0	0	0
67	UKR	Lolita Yermak / Alexander Liubchenko	281	2011/2012 season (100%)	0	148	133	0	0
68	FRA	Tiffany Zahorski / Alexis Miart	250	2011/2012 season (100%)	0	0	0	250	0
69	FRA	Estelle Elizabeth / Romain Le Gac	228	2011/2012 season (100%)	0	120	108	0	0
70	CHN	Yiyi Zhang / Nan Wu	224	2011/2012 season (100%)	127	97	0	0	0
71	USA	Rachel Parsons / Michael Parsons	222	2011/2012 season (100%)	114	108	0	0	0
72	CAN	Andreanne Poulin / Marc-Andre Servant	216	2011/2012 season (100%)	68	148	0	0	0
73	USA	Charlotte Lichtman / Dean Copely	213	2011/2012 season (100%)	0	213	0	0	0
73	CAN	Tarrah Harvey / Keith Gagnon	213	2011/2012 season (100%)	0	213	0	0	0
75	BLR	Viktoria Kavaliova / Yurii Bieliaiev	195	2011/2012 season (100%)	75	120	0	0	0
76	USA	Emily Samuelson / Todd Gilles	191	2011/2012 season (100%)	0	191	0	0	0
77	TUR	Alisa Agafonova / Alper Uçar	182	2011/2012 season (100%)	0	0	0	182	0
77	RUS	Valeria Loseva / Denis Lunin	182	2011/2012 season (100%)	0	182	0	0	0
79	USA	Anastasia Cannuscio / Colin McManus	164	2011/2012 season (100%)	0	0	0	164	0
79	RUS	Daria Morozova / Mikhail Zhirnov	164	2011/2012 season (100%)	0	164	0	0	0
79	CAN	Madeline Edwards / Zhao Kai Pang	164	2011/2012 season (100%)	0	164	0	0	0
79	USA	Madeline Heritage / Nathaniel Fast	164	2011/2012 season (100%)	0	164	0	0	0
83	RUS	Maria Simonova / Dmitriy Dragun	148	2011/2012 season (100%)	0	148	0	0	0
83	CAN	Noa Bruser / Timothy Lum	148	2011/2012 season (100%)	0	148	0	0	0
85	KAZ	Karina Uzurova / Ilias Ali	133	2011/2012 season (100%)	0	133	0	0	0
85	GBR	Sarah Coward / Avidan Brown	133	2011/2012 season (100%)	0	133	0	0	0
85	RUS	Sofia Evdokimova / Egor Bazin	133	2011/2012 season (100%)	0	133	0	0	0
88	SVK	Natalia Jancosek / Petr Seknicka	120	2011/2012 season (100%)	0	120	0	0	0
89	NZL	Ayesha Yigit / Shane Speden	108	2011/2012 season (100%)	0	108	0	0	0
89	CAN	Caelen Dalmer / Shane Firus	108	2011/2012 season (100%)	0	108	0	0	0
89	USA	Danielle Gamelin / Alexander Gamelin	108	2011/2012 season (100%)	0	108	0	0	0
89	ISR	Ekaterina Bugrov / Vasili Rogov	108	2011/2012 season (100%)	0	108	0	0	0
93	FRA	Jessica Flemin / Jeremy Flemin	97	2011/2012 season (100%)	0	97	0	0	0
93	USA	Jessica Mancini / Tyler Brooks	97	2011/2012 season (100%)	0	97	0	0	0
93	FRA	Laura Boutary / Mahil Chantelauze	97	2011/2012 season (100%)	0	97	0	0	0
93	FRA	Lindsay Pousset / Louis Thauron	97	2011/2012 season (100%)	0	97	0	0	0
93	FRA	Myriam Gassoumi / Clement Le Molaire	97	2011/2012 season (100%)	0	97	0	0	0
98	GBR	Olivia Smart / Joseph Buckland	93	2011/2012 season (100%)	93	0	0	0	0
99	TUR	Cagla Demirsal / Berk Akalin	83	2011/2012 season (100%)	83	0	0	0	0

== World standings for synchronized skating ==
Senior Synchronized (38 Teams)

Junior Synchronized (42 Teams)

== See also ==
- ISU World Standings
- ISU Season's World Ranking
- 2011–12 figure skating season
- 2011–12 synchronized skating season
