= 2011 World Junior Figure Skating Championships =

- Type: ISU Championship
- Date: February 28 – March 6
- Season: 2010–11
- Location: Gangneung, South Korea
- Host: Korea Skating Union

Champions
- Men's singles: (Canada) Andrei Rogozine
- Ladies' singles: (Russia) Adelina Sotnikova
- Pairs: (China) Sui Wenjing / Han Cong
- Ice dance: (Russia) Ksenia Monko / Kirill Khaliavin
- Previous: 2010 World Junior Championships
- Next: 2012 World Junior Championships

The 2011 World Junior Figure Skating Championships was an international figure skating competition during the 2010–11 season. Commonly called "World Juniors" and "Junior Worlds", the event crowned the World Junior Champions in the disciplines of men's singles, ladies' singles, pair skating, and ice dancing.

The event took place in Gangneung, South Korea from 28 February to 6 March 2011. It was a qualification event for the figure skating events at the 2012 Winter Youth Olympics.

== Qualification ==
The competition was open to skaters from ISU Member Nations who were at least 13 but not 19—or 21 for male pair skaters and ice dancers—before July 1, 2010, in their place of birth. National associations selected their entries according to their own criteria.

The term "Junior" in ISU competition refers to age, not skill level. Skaters may remain age-eligible for Junior Worlds even after competing nationally and internationally at the senior level. At junior events, the ISU requires that all programs conform to junior-specific rules regarding program length, jumping passes, types of elements, etc.

=== Number of entries per discipline ===
Based on the results of the 2010 World Junior Championships, the ISU allowed each country one to three entries per discipline. Countries which qualified more than one entry in a discipline:

Spots	Men	Ladies	Pairs	Dance
3	Japan; Russia; United States	Japan; Russia; United States	China; Japan; Russia	Russia; United States
2	Canada; China; Kazakhstan; Sweden	Canada; Germany; Sweden	Canada; United States	Canada; France; Italy; Ukraine

If not listed above, one entry was allowed.

- Kazakhstan declined second spot in men's singles competition.
- China declined two spots in the pairs competition.
- Japan declined two spots in the pairs competition.
- Italy declined second spot in the ice dance competition.

== Entries ==
201 athletes from 48 countries participated in this edition.

Country	Men	Ladies	Pairs	Ice dancing
Armenia	Slavik Hayrapetyan	Marta Grigoryan		
Australia	Brendan Kerry	Brooklee Han		Kimberley Hew-Low / Cameron Hemmert
Austria		Victoria Hübler	Stina Martini / Severin Kiefer	
Belarus	Vitali Luchanok	Nastassia Hrybko	Maria Paliakova / Mikhail Fomichev	Viktoria Kavaleva / Yirii BieLiaiec
Belgium	Jorik Hendrickx	Ira Vannut		
Bulgaria	Manol Atanassov	Daniela Stoeva		Kristina Tremasova / Dimitar Lichev
Canada	Liam Firus; Andrei Rogozine	Vanessa Grenier; Alexandra Najarro	Brittany Jones / Kurtis Gaskell; Natasha Purich / Raymond Schultz	Kelly Oliveira / Jordan Hockley; Nicole Orford / Thomas Williams
China	Liu Jiaxing; Yan Han	Li Zijun	Sui Wenjing / Han Cong	Zhang Yiyi / Wu Nan
Chinese Taipei	Jordan Ju	Jiajen Hsieh		
Czech Republic	Petr Coufal		Klara Kadlecova / Petr Bidar	Karolina Prochazkova / Michal Ceska
Denmark		Anita Madsen		
Estonia	Viktor Romanenkov	Gerli Liinamäe		Irina Shtork / Taavi Rand
Finland	Bela Papp	Juulia Turkkila		Olesia Karmi / Max Lindholm
France	Romain Ponsart	Yretha Silete		Gabriella Papadakis / Guillaume Cizeron; Tiffany Zahorski / Alexis Miart
Georgia	Armen Agaian			
Germany	Denis Wieczorek	Isabel Drescher; Nicole Schott		Dominique Dieck / Michael Zenkner
(United Kingdom) Great Britain	Harry Mattick	Katie Powell	Catherine Clement / James Hunt	Charlotte Aiken / Josh Whidborne
Hong Kong	Harry Hau Yin Lee	Sumika Yamada		
Hungary		Chelsea-Rose Chiappa	Anna Khnychenkova / Mark Magyar	
Israel		Margot Krisberg		Ekaterina Bugrov / Vasili Rogov
Italy	Saverio Giacomelli	Alice Garlisi	Carolina Gillespie / Luca Demattè	Sofia Sforza / Francesco Fioretti
Japan	Ryuichi Kihara; Kento Nakamura; Keiji Tanaka	Yuki Nishino; Miyabi Oba; Risa Shoji	Narumi Takahashi / Mervin Tran	Misato Komatsubara / Kokoro Mizutani
Kazakhstan	Abzal Rakimgaliev	Kristina Prilepko		Karina Uzurova / Ilias Ali
Latvia	Girts Jekabsons	Alina Fjodorova		Ksenia Pecherkina / Aleksander Jakushin
Lithuania	Saulius Ambrulevičius	Rimgaile Meskaite		Teressa Velirath / Aleksandr Pirogov
Malaysia	Ryan Zhi Jwen Yee	Siau Chian Ching		
Mexico		Reyna Hamui		
Mongolia		Maral-Erdene Gansukh		
Netherlands	Boyito Mulder	Joyce den Hollander	Rachel Epstein / Dmitry Epstein	
New Zealand		Madelaine Parker		Ayesha Yigit / Shane Speden
Norway		Anne Line Gjersem		
Philippines		Zhaira Costiniano		
Poland	Kamil Białas	Alexandra Kamieniecki	Magdalena Klatka / Radosław Chruściński	Baily Carroll / Peter Gerber
Romania	Vlad Ionescu			
Russia	Zhan Bush; Artur Dmitriev Jr. Gordei Gorshkov	Polina Shelepen; Adelina Sotnikova; Elizaveta Tuktamysheva	Kristina Astakhova / Nikita Bochkov; Ksenia Stolbova / Fedor Klimov; Alexandra Vasilieva / Yuri Shevchuk	Evgenia Kosigina / Nikolai Moroshkin; Ksenia Monko / Kirill Khaliavin; Ekaterina Pushkash / Jonathan Guerreiro
Serbia		Sandra Ristivojevic		
Singapore		Brittany Lau		
Slovakia		Monika Simancikova		Nikola Višňová / Lukáš Csolley
Slovenia		Patricia Gleščič		
South Africa		Nadia Geldenhuys		
South Korea	Lee Dong-won	Lee Ho-jung		
Spain	Francesc Palau	Celia Robledo		Sara Hurtado / Adria Diaz
Sweden	Alexander Majorov; Ondrej Spiegl	Rebecka Emanuelsson; Isabelle Olsson		
Switzerland	Tomi Pulkkinen	Romy Buhler	Anaïs Morand / Timothy Leemann	Ramona Elsener / Florian Roost
Thailand	Suchet Kongchim	Mimi Tanasorn Chindasook		
Turkey	Engin Ali Artan	Sıla Saygı		Cagla Demirsal / Berk Akalin
Ukraine	Stanislav Pertsov	Alina Milevskaya	Julia Lavrentieva / Yuri Rudik	Anastasia Galyeta / Alexei Shumski; Maria Nosulia / Evgen Kholoniuk
United States	Max Aaron; Jason Brown; Keegan Messing	Christina Gao; Courtney Hicks; Agnes Zawadzki	Cassie Andrews / Timothy Leduc; Ashley Cain / Joshua Reagan	Lauri Bonacorsi / Travis Mager; Anastasia Cannuscio / Colin McManus; Charlotte Lichtman / Dean Copely

== Overview ==
China's Sui Wenjing / Han Cong won the pairs' title for the second year in a row. Switching their 2010 placements, Russia's Ksenia Stolbova / Fedor Klimov took the silver medal and Japan's Narumi Takahashi / Mervin Tran the bronze.

Andrei Rogozine became the first Canadian men's skater to win the World Junior title since 1978. Japan's Keiji Tanaka took the silver medal and Alexander Majorov took the bronze, becoming the first Swedish men's skater to step on the podium at Junior Worlds.

Bronze medalists in 2010, Ksenia Monko / Kirill Khaliavin of Russia won gold in 2011. The silver went to another Russian team, Ekaterina Pushkash / Jonathan Guerreiro, and bronze to Americans Charlotte Lichtman / Dean Copely.

In the ladies' event, Adelina Sotnikova and Elizaveta Tuktamysheva won gold and silver for Russia and American Agnes Zawadzki took the bronze medal.

== Results ==
=== Men ===
Rank	Name	Nation	Total points	PR		SP		FS	
1	Andrei Rogozine	Canada	200.13			3	67.27	2	132.86
2	Keiji Tanaka	Japan	196.98	1	128.56	6	64.06	1	132.92
3	Alexander Majorov	Sweden	195.71			4	67.12	3	128.59
4	Keegan Messing	United States	195.07			1	72.58	7	122.49
5	Max Aaron	United States	193.92			5	66.96	4	126.96
6	Yan Han	China	187.49			8	60.89	5	126.60
7	Jason Brown	United States	185.44			7	62.64	6	122.80
8	Artur Dmitriev Jr.	Russia	181.19	3	110.86	2	68.91	11	112.28
9	Gordei Gorshkov	Russia	177.34			14	56.37	8	120.97
10	Ryuichi Kihara	Japan	175.72	2	123.07	12	58.75	9	116.97
11	Zhan Bush	Russia	174.92			10	59.58	10	115.34
12	Abzal Rakimgaliev	Kazakhstan	168.82			9	60.48	13	108.34
13	Jorik Hendrickx	Belgium	166.53			13	57.89	12	108.64
14	Kento Nakamura	Japan	158.13			15	55.33	14	102.80
15	Stanislav Pertsov	Ukraine	154.48	14	84.34	11	58.79	18	95.69
16	Liu Jiaxing	China	153.56			16	54.88	16	98.68
17	Romain Ponsart	France	150.00			19	50.92	15	99.08
18	Viktor Romanenkov	Estonia	144.87	6	98.39	21	49.63	19	95.24
19	Petr Coufal	Czech Republic	144.03	5	102.93	17	52.70	21	91.33
20	Liam Firus	Canada	143.26	4	108.25	24	46.90	17	96.36
21	Denis Wieczorek	Germany	142.01			22	48.75	20	93.26
22	Bela Papp	Finland	138.63	8	97.60	20	49.77	22	88.86
23	Vitali Luchanok	Belarus	138.27	13	86.02	18	51.27	23	87.00
24	Kamil Białas	Poland	133.44			23	46.93	24	86.51
Did not advance to free skating
25	Tomi Pulkkinen	Switzerland		9	96.19	25	46.82		
26	Saverio Giacomelli	Italy		10	95.76	26	46.65		
27	Ondrej Spiegl	Sweden		11	92.01	27	44.83		
28	Jordan Ju	Chinese Taipei		12	87.85	28	43.95		
29	Francesc Palau	Spain				29	43.49		
30	Lee Dong-won	South Korea		7	97.99	30	42.25		
did not advance to short program
31	Boyito Mulder	Netherlands		15	80.43				
32	Harry Mattick	United Kingdom		16	79.32				
33	Brendan Kerry	Australia		17	76.62				
34	Vlad Ionescu	Romania		18	75.71				
35	Manol Atanassov	Bulgaria		19	72.14				
36	Harry Hau Yin Lee	Hong Kong		20	69.67				
37	Slavik Hayrapetyan	Armenia		21	68.49				
38	Saulius Ambrulevičius	Lithuania		22	64.32				
39	Ryan Zhi Jwen Yee	Malaysia		23	59.57				
40	Engin Ali Artan	Turkey		24	58.53				
41	Suchet Kongchim	Thailand		25	53.34				
42	Armen Agaian	Georgia		26	51.40				
WD	Girts Jekabsons	Latvia							

=== Ladies ===
Rank	Name	Nation	Total points	PR		SP		FS	
1	Adelina Sotnikova	Russia	174.96			1	59.51	1	115.45
2	Elizaveta Tuktamysheva	Russia	169.11			2	58.60	2	110.51
3	Agnes Zawadzki	United States	161.07			5	53.17	3	107.90
4	Christina Gao	United States	155.27			3	56.80	6	98.47
5	Risa Shoji	Japan	151.27	2	89.24	7	51.49	5	99.78
6	Courtney Hicks	United States	150.92			10	49.98	4	100.94
7	Polina Shelepen	Russia	149.93			4	56.58	8	93.35
8	Miyabi Oba	Japan	148.62	1	91.84	6	51.82	7	96.80
9	Li Zijun	China	139.81	3	89.10	8	51.00	10	88.81
10	Ira Vannut	Belgium	133.51	5	79.93	18	41.12	9	92.39
11	Yretha Silete	France	128.60			9	50.24	11	78.36
12	Yuki Nishino	Japan	121.14			11	46.09	15	75.05
13	Alice Garlisi	Italy	119.61	9	75.73	14	43.67	14	75.94
14	Romy Bühler	Switzerland	119.22			16	41.40	12	77.82
15	Gerli Liinamäe	Estonia	117.86			12	44.34	16	73.52
16	Juulia Turkkila	Finland	115.78			21	39.54	13	76.24
17	Victoria Hübler	Austria	111.91	11	69.65	20	39.69	17	72.22
18	Monika Simančíková	Slovakia	109.53	7	76.81	19	39.71	19	69.82
19	Isabel Drescher	Germany	109.48			22	38.62	18	70.86
20	Patricia Gleščič	Slovenia	107.16	10	72.77	17	41.39	22	65.77
21	Brooklee Han	Australia	106.98	12	68.49	23	38.28	20	68.70
22	Nicole Schott	Germany	106.54			15	41.41	23	65.13
23	Lee Ho-jung	South Korea	105.92	4	81.27	24	38.12	21	67.80
24	Isabelle Olsson	Sweden	104.54			13	43.69	24	60.85
Did not advance to free skating
25	Alexandra Najarro	Canada				25	37.04		
26	Sıla Saygı	Turkey				26	36.77		
27	Alexandra Kamieniecki	Poland		6	78.19	27	36.71		
28	Alina Fjodorova	Latvia		8	75.82	28	35.99		
29	Anita Madsen	Denmark				29	35.59		
30	Rebecka Emanuelsson	Sweden				30	28.47		
did not advance to short program
31	Katie Powell	United Kingdom		13	65.54				
32	Rimgaile Meskaite	Lithuania		14	64.65				
33	Anne Line Gjersem	Norway		15	62.70				
34	Alina Milevska	Ukraine		16	62.36				
35	Vanessa Grenier	Canada		17	61.76				
36	Zhaira Costiniano	Philippines		18	61.32				
37	Chelsea Rose Chiappa	Hungary		19	57.56				
38	Joyce den Hollander	Netherlands		20	57.55				
39	Marta Grigoryan	Armenia		21	56.95				
40	Mimi Tanasorn Chindasook	Thailand		22	55.78				
41	Madelaine Parker	New Zealand		23	55.50				
42	Reyna Hamui	Mexico		24	55.09				
43	Celia Robledo	Spain		25	53.42				
44	Margot Krisberg	Israel		26	51.71				
45	Nastassia Hrybko	Belarus		27	51.45				
46	Daniela Stoeva	Bulgaria		28	48.27				
47	Brittany Lau	Singapore		29	47.39				
48	Nadia Geldenhuys	South Africa		30	45.67				
49	Kristina Prilepko	Kazakhstan		31	45.27				
50	Sumika Yamada	Hong Kong		32	43.76				
51	Sandra Ristivojevic	Serbia		33	42.89				
52	Jiajen Hsieh	Chinese Taipei		34	36.75				
53	Maral-Erdene Gansukh	Mongolia		35	31.93				
54	Siau Chian Ching	Malaysia		36	29.42				

=== Pairs ===
Rank	Name	Nation	Total points	SP		FS	
1	Sui Wenjing / Han Cong	China	167.01	1	59.16	1	107.85
2	Ksenia Stolbova / Fedor Klimov	Russia	159.60	3	54.21	2	105.39
3	Narumi Takahashi / Mervin Tran	Japan	154.52	2	57.85	3	96.67
4	Ashley Cain / Joshua Reagan	United States	135.40	8	43.74	4	91.66
5	Natasha Purich / Raymond Schultz	Canada	129.97	4	47.33	6	82.64
6	Brittany Jones / Kurtis Gaskell	Canada	129.28	7	44.64	5	84.64
7	Kristina Astakhova / Nikita Bochkov	Russia	118.75	5	46.67	11	72.08
8	Klára Kadlecová / Petr Bidař	Czech Republic	117.24	9	42.90	9	74.34
9	Cassie Andrews / Timothy Leduc	United States	117.11	11	40.16	7	76.95
10	Carolina Gillespie / Luca Demattè	Italy	116.44	12	39.93	8	76.51
11	Alexandra Vasilieva / Yuri Shevchuk	Russia	114.98	6	45.83	12	69.15
12	Anaïs Morand / Timothy Leemann	Switzerland	113.30	10	40.74	10	72.56
13	Anna Khnychenkova / Mark Magyar	Hungary	106.99	13	38.35	13	68.64
14	Magdalena Klatka / Radosław Chruściński	Poland	103.13	15	37.03	14	66.10
15	Julia Lavrentieva / Yuri Rudik	Ukraine	102.29	14	37.21	15	65.08
16	Stina Martini / Severin Kiefer	Austria	96.53	16	35.78	16	60.75
Did not advance to free skating
17	Rachel Epstein / Dmitry Epstein	Netherlands		17	35.53		
18	Maria Paliakova / Mikhail Fomichev	Belarus		18	34.14		
19	Catherine Clement / James Hunt	United Kingdom		19	25.15		

=== Ice dancing ===
Rank	Name	Nation	Total points	PR		SD		FD	
1	Ksenia Monko / Kirill Khaliavin	Russia	144.16			1	60.62	1	83.54
2	Ekaterina Pushkash / Jonathan Guerreiro	Russia	134.64			2	55.76	3	78.88
3	Charlotte Lichtman / Dean Copely	United States	133.36			3	55.28	4	78.08
4	Tiffany Zahorski / Alexis Miart	France	128.16			9	48.96	2	79.20
5	Nikola Višňová / Lukáš Csolley	Slovakia	126.07	2	66.67	4	52.00	6	74.07
6	Evgenia Kosigina / Nikolai Moroshkin	Russia	125.43			6	50.88	5	74.55
7	Anastasia Cannuscio / Colin McManus	United States	122.90			5	50.94	8	71.96
8	Nicole Orford / Thomas Williams	Canada	122.22			8	49.81	7	72.41
9	Sara Hurtado / Adrià Díaz	Spain	120.41	3	64.42	10	48.84	10	71.57
10	Irina Shtork / Taavi Rand	Estonia	117.50	4	62.55	7	50.09	12	67.41
11	Lauri Bonacorsi / Travis Mager	United States	117.26			11	48.63	11	68.63
12	Gabriella Papadakis / Guillaume Cizeron	France	115.56	1	74.27	15	43.97	9	71.59
13	Anastasia Galyeta / Alexei Shumski	Ukraine	112.11			12	48.45	14	63.66
14	Ramona Elsener / Florian Roost	Switzerland	110.39	8	57.34	13	47.20	15	63.19
15	Kelly Oliveira / Jordan Hockley	Canada	109.66			14	45.14	13	64.52
16	Dominique Dieck / Michael Zenkner	Germany	102.68			16	42.35	17	60.33
17	Karina Uzurova / Ilias Ali	Kazakhstan	101.98	7	58.41	17	41.70	18	60.28
18	Charlotte Aiken / Josh Whidborne	United Kingdom	101.42			18	40.96	16	60.46
19	Maria Nosulia / Evgen Kholoniuk	Ukraine	96.35	5	59.23	19	39.36	19	56.99
20	Sofia Sforza / Francesco Fioretti	Italy	89.36			20	38.73	20	50.63
Did not advance to free dance
21	Zhang Yiyi / Wu Nan	China		6	58.93	21	38.06		
22	Baily Carroll / Peter Gerber	Poland		10	53.37	22	37.21		
23	Viktoria Kavaleva / Yurii Bieliaiev	Belarus		9	54.02	23	36.68		
24	Kristina Tremasova / Dimitar Lichev	Bulgaria		11	52.13	24	32.56		
WD	Karolína Procházková / Michal Češka	Czech Republic							
did not advance to short dance
26	Olesia Karmi / Max Lindholm	Finland		12	51.91				
27	Teressa Vellrath / Aleksandr Pirogov	Lithuania		13	50.50				
28	Misato Komatsubara / Kokoro Mizutani	Japan		14	48.87				
29	Ekaterina Bugrov / Vasili Rogov	Israel		15	48.75				
30	Cagla Demirsal / Berk Akalin	Turkey		16	48.42				
31	Ksenia Pecherkina / Aleksander Jakushin	Latvia		17	48.28				
32	Kimberley Hew-Low / Cameron Hemmert	Australia		18	36.48				
33	Ayesha Yigit / Shane Speden	New Zealand		19	36.25				

== Medals summary ==
=== Medalists ===
Medals for overall placement:

Discipline	Gold	Silver	Bronze
Men	(Canada) Andrei Rogozine	(Japan) Keiji Tanaka	(Sweden) Alexander Majorov
Ladies	(Russia) Adelina Sotnikova	(Russia) Elizaveta Tuktamysheva	(United States) Agnes Zawadzki
Pair skating	(China) Sui Wenjing / Han Cong	(Russia) Ksenia Stolbova / Fedor Klimov	(Japan) Narumi Takahashi / Mervin Tran
Ice dancing	(Russia) Ksenia Monko / Kirill Khaliavin	(Russia) Ekaterina Pushkash / Jonathan Guerreiro	(United States) Charlotte Lichtman / Dean Copely

Small medals for placement in the short segment:

Discipline	Gold	Silver	Bronze
Men	(United States) Keegan Messing	(Russia) Artur Dmitriev, Jr.	(Canada) Andrei Rogozine
Ladies	(Russia) Adelina Sotnikova	(Russia) Elizaveta Tuktamysheva	(United States) Christina Gao
Pair skating	(China) Sui Wenjing / Han Cong	(Japan) Narumi Takahashi / Mervin Tran	(Russia) Ksenia Stolbova / Fedor Klimov
Ice dancing	(Russia) Ksenia Monko / Kirill Khaliavin	(Russia) Ekaterina Pushkash / Jonathan Guerreiro	(United States) Charlotte Lichtman / Dean Copely

Small medals for placement in the free segment:

Discipline	Gold	Silver	Bronze
Men	(Japan) Keiji Tanaka	(Canada) Andrei Rogozine	(Sweden) Alexander Majorov
Ladies	(Russia) Adelina Sotnikova	(Russia) Elizaveta Tuktamysheva	(United States) Agnes Zawadzki
Pair skating	(China) Sui Wenjing / Han Cong	(Russia) Ksenia Stolbova / Fedor Klimov	(Japan) Narumi Takahashi / Mervin Tran
Ice dancing	(Russia) Ksenia Monko / Kirill Khaliavin	(France) Tiffany Zahorski / Alexis Miart	(Russia) Ekaterina Pushkash / Jonathan Guerreiro

=== By country ===
Table of medals for overall placement:

Rank	Nation	Gold	Silver	Bronze	Total
1	Russia (RUS)	2	3	0	5
2	Canada (CAN)	1	0	0	1
2	China (CHN)	1	0	0	1
4	Japan (JPN)	0	1	1	2
5	United States (USA)	0	0	2	2
6	Sweden (SWE)	0	0	1	1
Totals (6 entries)		4	4	4	12

== Prize money ==
	Prize money (US$)	
Placement	Men's / Ladies' singles	Pairs / Ice dancers
1st	10,000	15,000
2nd	7,000	10,500
3rd	5,000	7,000
4th	3,500	4,500
5th	2,750	4,000
6th	2,500	3,750
7th	2,250	3,500
8th	2,000	3,000
9th	1,750	2,750
10th	1,500	2,250
11th	1,250	1,750
12th	1,000	1,500
Pairs and ice dance couples split the amount. Total prize money: US$200,000.
