= Andrei Rogozine =

Canadian figure skater

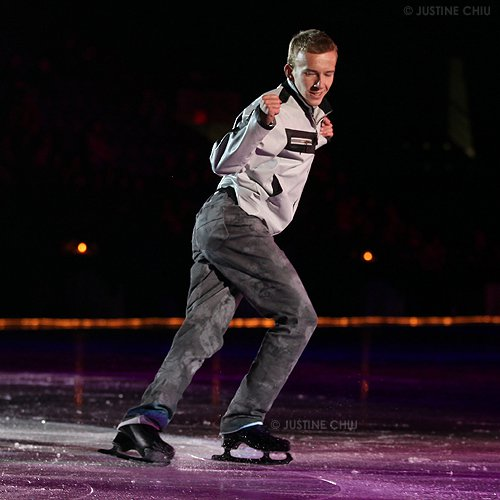
- Rogozine in 2010

Personal information
- Born: 29 January 1993 (age 33) Moscow, Russia
- Height: 1.73 m (5 ft 8 in)

Figure skating career
- Country: Canada
- Coach: Michael Coreno; Robert Kazimir
- Skating club: Nepean FSC
- Began skating: 1999
- Retired: July 28, 2016
Medal record
Representing Canada
Figure skating: Men's singles
World Junior Championships
Gold medal – first place	2011 Gangneung	Men's singles
Junior Grand Prix Final
Bronze medal – third place	2010–11 Beijing	Men's singles

Andrei Rogozine (Russian: Андрей Рогозин; born 29 January 1993) is a Canadian former competitive figure skater. He is the 2011 World Junior champion, 2010 JGP Final bronze medallist, and 2013 Canadian national bronze medallist.

== Personal life ==
Andrei Rogozine was born January 29, 1993, in Moscow, Russia. His family moved to Canada when he was five. He attended Richmond Green Secondary School in Richmond Hill, Ontario. He moved to Newmarket, Ontario, in 2011 and now lives in Ottawa.

== Career ==
Rogozine started skating when he was six years old, instructed by Inga Zusev. He began learning at the Forest Hill Skating Club. He was inspired by Alexei Yagudin, the 2002 Olympic champion.

Rogozine debuted on the ISU Junior Grand Prix in the 2007–08 season. Andrei Berezintsev joined Zusev as his coach around 2009.

Rogozine won his first international medal, gold, at the 2010 JGP in Courchevel, France. After winning his other JGP assignment, in Japan, he qualified for the JGP Final in Beijing, where he was awarded the bronze. In March 2011, he competed at the World Junior Championships in Gangneung, South Korea. Ranked third in the short program and second in the free, Rogozine finished first overall with a 3.15 point margin over the silver medallist, Keiji Tanaka of Japan. He was the first Canadian in 33 years to win the World Junior men's title.

Rogozine made his Grand Prix debut in the 2011–12 season. He was a co-recipient of an Elvis Stojko bursary.

Rogozine was coached by Zusev and Berezintsev at the Richmond Training Centre in Richmond Hill, Ontario, until 2014. He then moved to Colorado Springs, Colorado, to train with Tom Zakrajsek. He represented the Nepean Skating Club.

After retiring from competition on July 28, 2016, Rogozine began performing in ice shows on cruise ships.

== Programs ==
Season	Short program	Free skating	Exhibition
2014–15	Requiem Mass in Dm, K 626: VII Lacrimosa by Wolfgang Amadeus Mozart; Lacrimosa Dominae by Fayman and Goren	Mission: Impossible 2 by Hans Zimmer; Mano a mano; Seville; Nyah and Ethan	
2013–14	Spring (from The Four Seasons) by Antonio Vivaldi arranged by Max Richter	Nyah (from Mission: Impossible 2) by Hans Zimmer	
2012–13	Broken Sorrow by Nuttin' But Stringz; Fanfare by Black Violin	Inception by Hans Zimmer	
2011–12	Broken Sorrow by Nuttin' But Stringz; Fanfare by Black Violin	Poeta by Vicente Amigo; Street Passions by Didula	Never Gonna Be Alone by Nickelback
2010–11	Piano Concerto in A Minor by Edvard Grieg performed by Maksim Mrvica	The Rock by Hans Zimmer	Duel by Bond
2009–10	Piano Concerto in A Minor by Edvard Grieg performed by Maksim Mrvica	Nostradamus by Maksim Mrvica	
2008–09	Hava Nagila	Don Quixote by Ludwig Minkus	
2007–08	Hava Nagila	Finlandia, Op. 26 by Jean Sibelius; Adagio of Spartacus and Phrygia by Aram Khachaturian; Dance of Thracians	

== Competitive highlights ==
GP: Grand Prix; CS: Challenger Series; JGP: Junior Grand Prix

International
Event	07–08	08–09	09–10	10–11	11–12	12–13	13–14	14–15
Worlds						13th		
Four Continents						10th		
GP NHK Trophy						9th		
GP Rostel. Cup					6th			
GP Skate Canada					7th		8th	9th
CS Autumn Classic								9th
CS U.S. Classic								6th
Nebelhorn Trophy						9th		
U.S. Classic							7th	
International: Junior
Junior Worlds			6th	1st				
JGP Final				3rd				
JGP Austria	14th							
JGP Czech Rep.		9th						
JGP France				1st				
JGP Germany			6th					
JGP Japan				1st				
JGP U.K.		8th						
JGP U.S.	8th		8th					
National
Canadian Champ.	5th J	1st J	11th	13th	5th	3rd	7th	9th
J: Junior level; WD: Withdrew
