= Elizaveta Tuktamysheva =

Russian figure skater (born 1996)

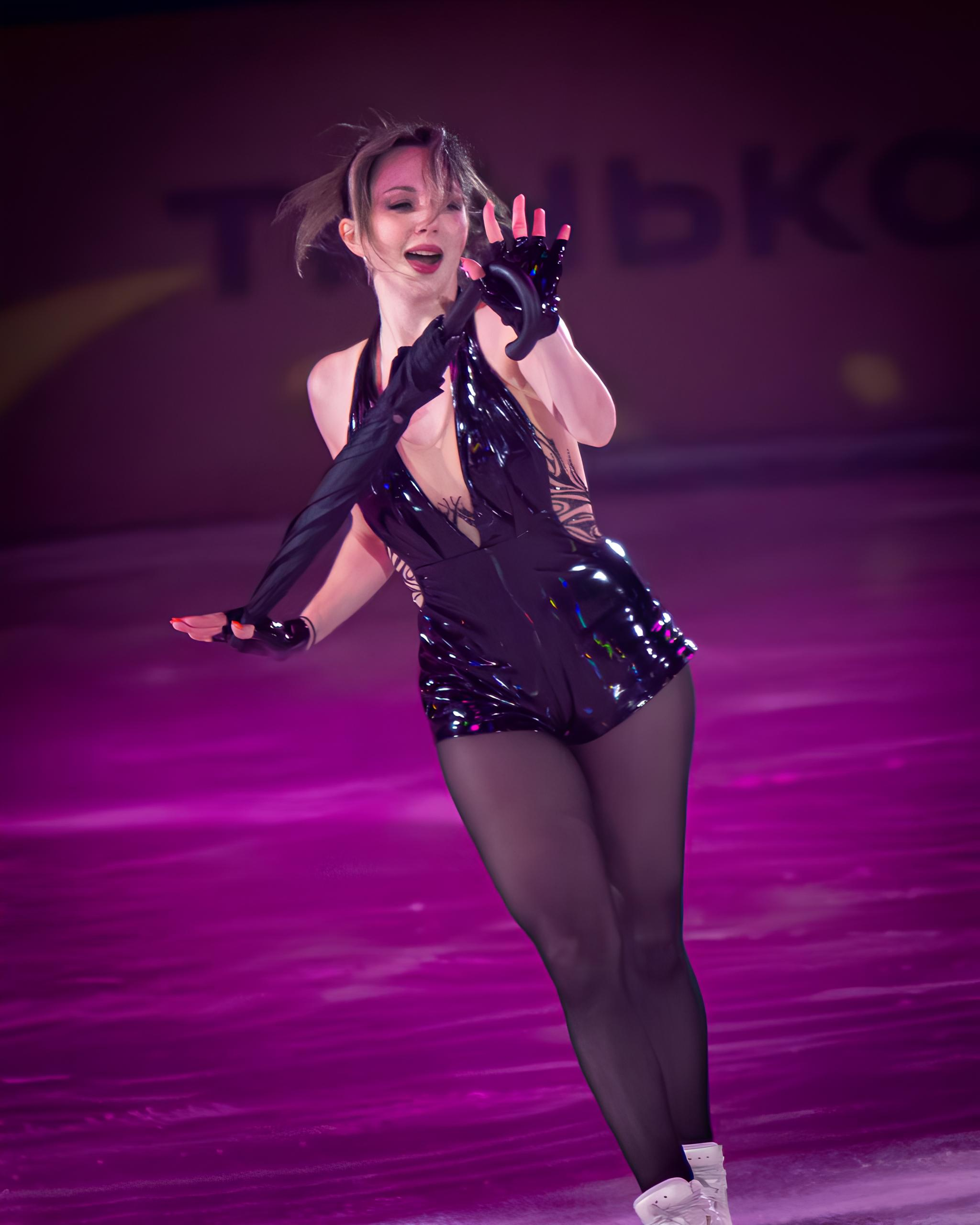
- Elizaveta Tuktamysheva in 2024

Personal information
- Native name: Елизавета Серге́евна Туктамышева (Russian)
- Full name: Elizaveta Sergeyevna Tuktamysheva
- Other names: The Empress; Liza (nickname)
- Born: 17 December 1996 (age 29) Glazov, Russia
- Home town: Saint Petersburg, Russia
- Height: 1.57 m (5 ft 2 in)

Figure skating career
- Country: Russia
- Discipline: Women's singles
- Coach: Alexei Mishin; Tatiana Prokofieva
- Skating club: Olympic School Zvezdni Led, St. Petersburg
- Began skating: 2001
- Retired: November 24, 2025
- Highest WS: 1st (2014–15)

Medal record
Event	Gold medal – first place	Silver medal – second place	Bronze medal – third place
World Championships	1	1	0
European Championships	1	0	1
Grand Prix Final	1	0	1
Russian Championships	1	3	2
World Team Trophy	1	1	1
Winter Youth Olympics	1	0	0
World Junior Championships	0	1	0
Junior Grand Prix Final	0	1	0
Medal list
World Championships
Gold medal – first place	2015 Shanghai	Singles
Silver medal – second place	2021 Stockholm	Singles
European Championships
Gold medal – first place	2015 Stockholm	Singles
Bronze medal – third place	2013 Zagreb	Singles
Grand Prix Final
Gold medal – first place	2014–15 Barcelona	Singles
Bronze medal – third place	2018–19 Vancouver	Singles
Russian Championships
Gold medal – first place	2013 Sochi	Singles
Silver medal – second place	2009 Kazan	Singles
Silver medal – second place	2015 Sochi	Singles
Silver medal – second place	2023 Krasnoyarsk	Singles
Bronze medal – third place	2010 Saint Petersburg	Singles
Bronze medal – third place	2011 Saransk	Singles
World Team Trophy
Gold medal – first place	2021 Osaka	Team
Silver medal – second place	2015 Tokyo	Team
Bronze medal – third place	2019 Fukuoka	Team
Winter Youth Olympics
Gold medal – first place	2012 Innsbruck	Singles
World Junior Championships
Silver medal – second place	2011 Gangneung	Singles
Junior Grand Prix Final
Silver medal – second place	2010–11 Beijing	Singles

Elizaveta Sergeyevna Tuktamysheva (/tʊkˈtɑːmɪʃəvə/ tuuk-TAH-mih-shə-və; Russian: Елизавета Серге́евна Туктамы́шева, IPA: [jɪlʲɪzɐˈvʲetə tʊktɐˈmɨʂɨvə]; born 17 December 1996) is a Russian former figure skater. She is the 2015 World champion, the 2021 World silver medalist, the 2015 European champion and the 2013 European bronze medalist. She has medaled 16 times on the Grand Prix series, including 5 gold medals and including gold at the 2014–15 Grand Prix Final and bronze at the 2018–19 Grand Prix Final. On national level she is an 8-time medalist in the Russian Championships and the 2013 Russian national champion, as well as 4-time medalist in the Russian Cup Finals. On the junior level, she is the 2012 Youth Olympic champion, 2011 World Junior silver medalist, and 2010–11 JGP Final silver medalist.

At the 2015 World Championships, she landed a triple axel in competition for the first time, making her the sixth woman, and second Russian woman to do so, and she became the first female skater to land four triple jumps in a short program (triple Axel, triple Lutz, and a triple toe-triple toe combination). At the 2018–19 Grand Prix Final, she landed the maximum eight triple jumps cleanly in the free skate allowed under the Zayak rule, becoming the third woman to do so after Japanese Rika Kihira and American Mirai Nagasu. She, therefore, also became the first woman to land the maximum twelve triple jumps in one international competition, albeit with the triple Axel in her short program deemed under-rotated. In the final event of the 2018–19 season, the 2019 World Team Trophy, she successfully landed all twelve jumps cleanly, becoming the first woman to accomplish this feat in an official international competition. She is also one of only four women to achieve a Grand Slam, when winning all major competitions in the 2014-15 season.

Tuktamysheva's career is notable for its consistency and longevity, especially in contrast with the young ages and high turnover of elite Russian women's skaters in her era („System Tutberidze“). Throughout 16 different seasons, she competed in 70 international events and 15 Russian Nationals, and never finished off the top 10. Additionally, she has maintained a triple axel for 8 years, landing it first in 2015, and still incorporating it in competitions in 2023.

== Personal life ==
Elizaveta Sergeyevna Tuktamysheva was born on 17 December 1996 in Glazov, Udmurtia, Russia. Her mother teaches algebra and geometry and was her daughter's class teacher from the 5th to 9th grade. Her father - a former skier who later coached football - died in April 2011. Elizaveta has a younger sister, Evgenia. The family moved from Glazov to Saint Petersburg in August 2011. Tuktamysheva had a Pomeranian dog named Kokosha, who died in March 2025.

In July 2020, Tuktamysheva received her diploma from the Lesgaft National State University of Physical Education, Sport and Health in Saint Petersburg.

She dated fellow Russian figure skater Andrei Lazukin from 2015 to 2020. As of 2026, she is in a relationship with fellow Russian figure skater, Petr Gumennik.

Tuktamysheva is bilingual and able to communicate in Russian and English fluently. In addition, she is a staunch advocate of women's rights in Russia, having criticized the country's rhetoric and policies in pressuring women to give birth, abortion restrictions, and the lack of protective laws towards victims of domestic violence.

=== Sanctions ===
In April 2023, Tuktamysheva was sanctioned by the Ukrainian government due to her her participating in a pro-war ice show, with all her assets in Ukraine frozen and a 50-year ban on entering the country. Tuktamysheva, herself, expressed disappointment about the ice show being used as a Russia propaganda tool, writing in an Instagram post, "I really wanted to believe that sports are outside of politics, but today it turned out not to be so. I love figure skating, I truly love what I do - I live it. I want to compete, I want to skate, I want to put on new programs, I want to participate in ice shows. But I don't want the performances of athletes to become a way of manipulation and beliefs. At a total loss..."

== Competitive career ==
=== Early years ===
Tuktamysheva started skating at the age of four after meeting girls interested in the sport at a summer camp. Her first coach was Svetlana Veretennikova in Glazov. Alexei Mishin observed Tuktamysheva at a competition in Belgorod but did not invite her into his group, considering her technique too incomplete. A year later, he saw her again and changed his mind due to her ability to jump high, but she had to rework the technique on all of her jumps. Since her family could not afford to move to a big city, she remained in Glazov, continuing to train under Veretennikova, but regularly visited Mishin in Saint Petersburg, where she lived in a dormitory. The train journey from Glazov to Saint Petersburg took 27 hours. Until the summer of 2011, she would spend an average of one to two weeks in Saint Petersburg and the rest of the month in Glazov.

Tuktamysheva was called a figure skating prodigy by the Russian media because at the age of 12, she performed difficult jumps, such as the triple Axel in practice, but she did not attempt the triple Axel in competition until 2015. In 2008, she placed tenth at the Russian Championships. Mishin was criticized for allowing Tuktamysheva to participate in the senior Russian Championships (2008) at only eleven years old.

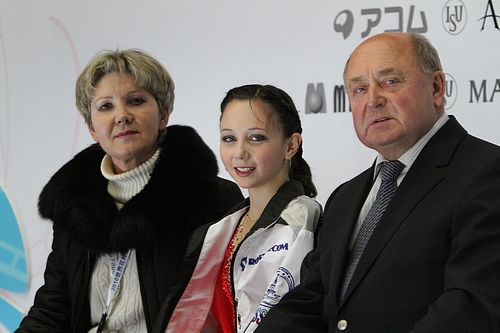
Tuktamysheva with her coaches, Svetlana Veretennikova and Alexei Mishin

=== 2009–2015: Russian Championships to World Championship ===
==== 2009–2010 season: Russian Championships silver ====
In 2009, Tuktamysheva won the silver medal at the Russian Championships after placing fifth in the short program and first in the free skating. She placed second with a margin of 0.67 points behind champion Adelina Sotnikova, who is half a year older than Tuktamysheva. Mishin said his student was Russia's "main hope for the gold medal at the Sochi Olympics". Despite her medal, she was not sent to any ISU Championships, including Junior Worlds because she was not old enough according to ISU rules.

At the 2010 Russian Championships, Tuktamysheva was tenth after the short program but earned 124.57 points in the free skate and was able to win a bronze medal. Her technical marks were higher than those of male competitors. In March, she skated in the Kings on Ice ice show. During the summer, she took part in training camps in Estonia, Italy, and Germany in preparation for the new season.

==== 2010–2011 season: Junior World silver ====
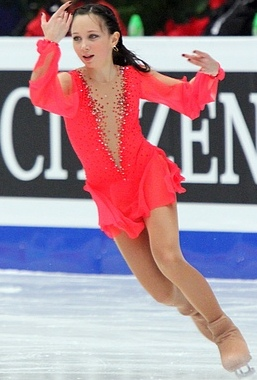
Tuktamysheva at the 2010–11 Junior Grand Prix Final

In the 2010–11 season, Tuktamysheva was old enough to compete in ISU Junior competitions. She won her Junior Grand Prix events in Germany and Romania and qualified for the Junior Grand Prix Final. At the Final, she placed second in both programs to win silver behind Adelina Sotnikova. At the 2011 Russian Championships, she placed seventh in the short program and 3rd in the long, to win the bronze medal. She won the Russian Junior Championships by placing first in both programs. At the 2011 World Junior Championships, she won the silver medal behind teammate Adelina Sotnikova.

Tuktamysheva settled with her family in Saint Petersburg in the summer of 2011. In preparation for the new season, she took part in Mishin's training camps in Jaca (Spain), Tartu (Estonia), and Pinzolo (Italy).

==== 2011–2012 season: Grand Prix debut and Youth Olympics ====
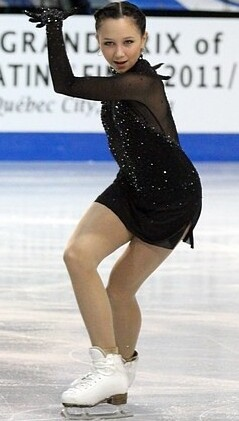
Tuktamysheva at the 2011–12 Grand Prix Final

According to ISU age rules, Tuktamysheva was eligible for the senior Grand Prix circuit during the 2011–12 season, although not for senior ISU Championships. She was assigned to two Grand Prix events, the 2011 Skate Canada International and 2011 Trophée Éric Bompard. Tuktamysheva replaced the injured Sarah Meier at the Japan Open in October and won the event. Tuktamysheva debuted on the senior Grand Prix circuit at Skate Canada International, where she won the gold medal with a combined personal best score of 177.38 points, becoming the youngest champion in the event since Tracey Wainman in 1981. She dedicated the win to her late father. Tuktamysheva then won gold at 2011 Trophée Éric Bompard to qualify for her first senior Grand Prix Final. She is the first ladies' skater to win her senior debut event and to win both events in her senior Grand Prix debut. At the Grand Prix Final, she finished fourth with a combined total of 174.51 points.

At the 2012 Russian Championships, Tuktamysheva was seventh in the short program and fourth in the free skate and finished sixth overall. She then competed at the 2012 Winter Youth Olympics and won the gold medal. Tuktamysheva withdrew from the 2012 World Junior Championships in order to prepare for the following season, including working on the triple Axel.

==== 2012–2013 season: National title and European bronze ====
In the summer before the 2012–13 season, Tuktamysheva sustained a knee injury. She was assigned to 2012 Skate Canada International and the 2012 Trophée Éric Bompard, entering both events as the defending champion. In October, Mishin said that her participation at Skate Canada International was uncertain due to injury and growth issues. Tuktamysheva did compete in Skate Canada International, placing sixth in the short program and third in the free skate. She finished fourth overall with a total score of 168.00, just 0.04 less than bronze medalist Kanako Murakami. At the 2012 Trophée Éric Bompard, Tuktamysheva was third in the short program and second in the free skate. She obtained a personal best free skating score, 121.36 points, and won the silver medal ahead of teammate Yulia Lipnitskaya. Tuktamysheva qualified for the Grand Prix Final in Sochi, Russia, where she was fifth in the short program and second in the long, finishing fifth overall. At the 2013 Russian Championships, also held in Sochi, she placed first in the short program but fell ill with a cold before the free skate. Mishin initially indicated that she would withdraw, but later she and her team decided she would compete. Tuktamysheva said, "I might find myself in an even worse situation in the future. I have to know how to handle it, so we decided to skate." She finished first in the free skate and won her first senior national title.

At the 2013 European Championships, Tuktamysheva placed fourth in the short program, first in the long program, and won the bronze medal overall. She and silver medalist Adelina Sotnikova were Russia's first medalists in the Europeans ladies' event since Irina Slutskaya won the title in 2006. At the 2013 World Championships, Tuktamysheva was fourteenth in the short program after falling from a sit spin and singling her double Axel. She placed eighth in the long program and finished tenth overall in her Worlds debut. At the 2013 World Team Trophy in Tokyo, she finished tenth individually while Team Russia was fourth overall.

==== 2013–2014 season ====
Tuktamysheva started her season at the 2013 Finlandia Trophy. Placing sixth in the short and second in the free, she won the bronze medal behind Akiko Suzuki and Yulia Lipnitskaya. At the 2013 Skate America, she placed ninth in the short and third in the free, finishing fourth overall with 176.75 points. Despite a back injury, she competed at her next event, the 2013 Rostelecom Cup, and finished fourth behind Mirai Nagasu. After taking the bronze medal at the 2013 Golden Spin of Zagreb behind Miki Ando, Tuktamysheva competed as the defending champion at the 2014 Russian Championships. She came in tenth after placing ninth in both segments. On 2 March 2014, she sustained an ankle injury at the Russian Cup Final – the preliminary diagnosis suggested a torn ankle ligament. Although she hoped to resume training at the end of March, her injury took longer to heal, and she returned to the ice in mid-June.

==== 2014–2015 season: World Champion ====
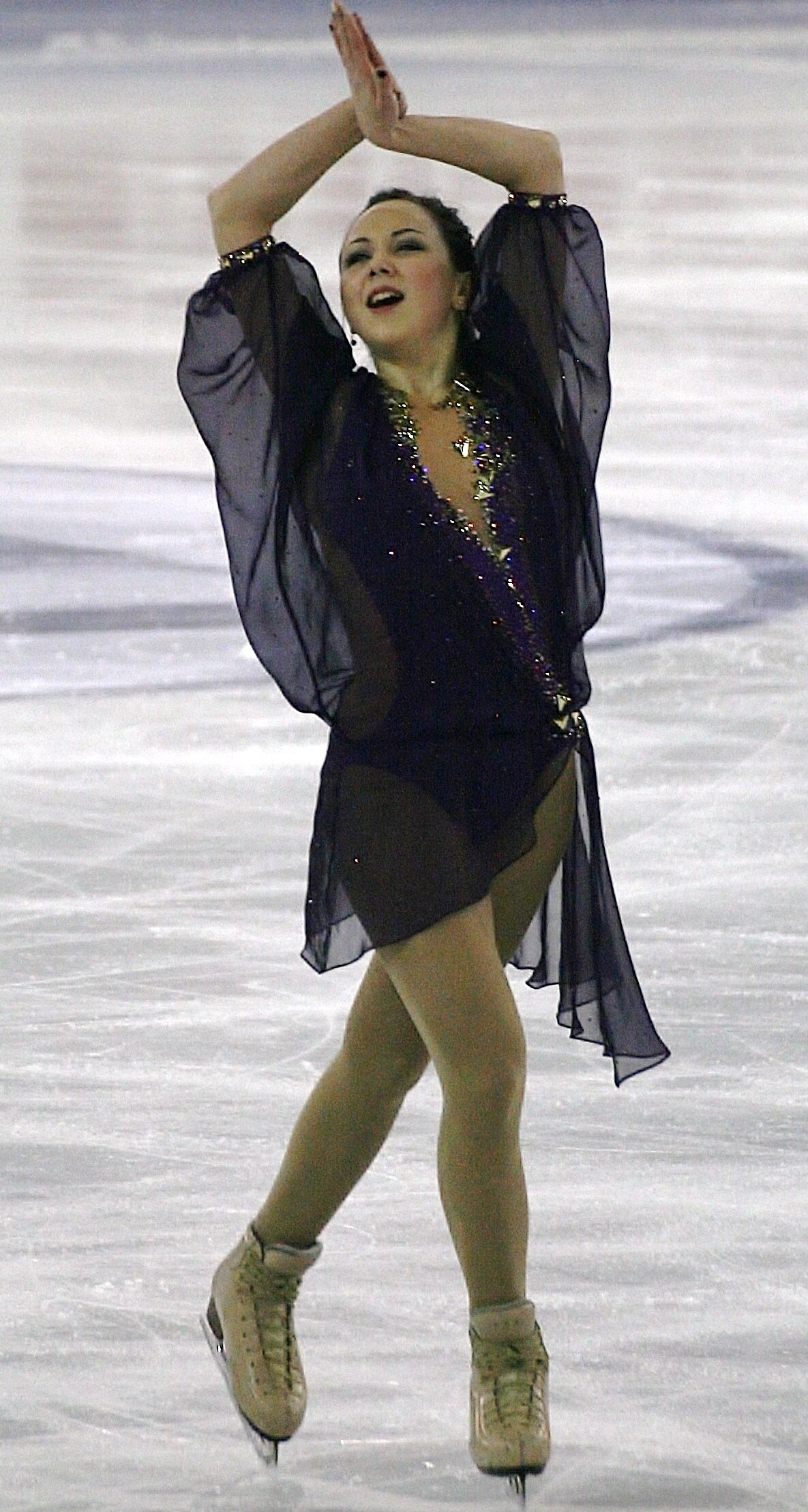
Tuktamysheva at the 2014–15 Grand Prix Final

Tuktamysheva began her season by winning her first ISU Challenger Series (CS) event, the 2014 Nebelhorn Trophy, where she outscored teammate Alena Leonova by almost six points and American Gracie Gold by over ten points. She then won another CS title at the 2014 Finlandia Trophy, defeating American Samantha Cesario by more than 30 points. She also won the CS title at the 2014 Warsaw Cup, and with these results, she later became the winner of the 2014–15 ISU Challenger Series.

Tuktamysheva started her Grand Prix season at the 2014 Skate America; she placed first in the short and second in the free skate, taking the silver medal behind Elena Radionova. At her next event, the 2014 Cup of China, she won the gold medal, beating teammate Yulia Lipnitskaya. The results qualified her to the Grand Prix Final, which she won with a new personal best combined total of 203.58, ahead of Radionova and American Ashley Wagner. At the 2015 Russian Championships, Tuktamysheva placed second in both programs, finishing with the silver behind Radionova. She subsequently won the 2015 European Championship by a slim margin of 0.86, finishing second in the short program and first in the free skate, posting personal bests in both segments.

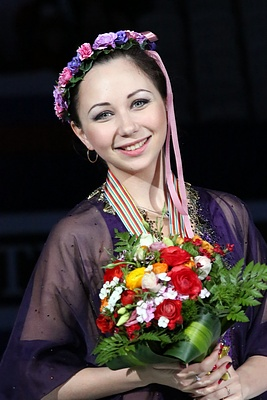
Tuktamysheva at the 2015 World Championships

At the 2015 World Figure Skating Championships, Tuktamysheva won the short program with a new personal best of 77.62, the third highest short program score under the ISU Judging System. She performed the triple Axel for the first time in major competition, becoming the sixth woman to complete the jump and the fourth to do so at the World Championships. She also completed a triple toe-triple toe combination and a triple Lutz, making her the first woman to land four triples in the short program. Tuktamysheva went on to win the free skate with a score of 132.74, for a total of 210.36. She decisively won the event, earning 16.76 points over silver medalist Satoko Miyahara, becoming the third Russian woman to win the World Championships (after Maria Butyrskaya in 1999 and Irina Slutskaya in 2002 and 2005).

After her victory, Tuktamysheva ended her season skating for team Russia at the 2015 World Team Trophy. She placed second in the short program, 0.33 points behind Gracie Gold, earning 11 points. She then won the free program with a score of 134.21 (including a triple Axel), winning 12 points, which greatly aided Team Russia in winning the silver medal.

=== 2015–2020: Injury and comeback ===
==== 2015–2016 season: Ankle injury and recovery ====
In the spring of 2015, Tuktamysheva went to Switzerland to work with Stéphane Lambiel on new programs and spent time training with Carolina Kostner while she was there. Lambiel choreographed Peer Gynt, her free program, and I Put a Spell on You, intended as her short program but which she decided to use as her exhibition. Benoît Richaud created her new short program, Carmina Burana.

Tuktamysheva began her season by placing third in the individual competition of the Japan Open before winning the gold medal at the 2015 International Cup of Nice. Turning to the Grand Prix series, she won silver at Skate Canada International behind Ashley Wagner after placing seventh in the short program but winning the free skate. At the Trophée Éric Bompard in Bordeaux, France, she placed fifth in the short program after falling on a triple Axel. Due to the cancellation of the free skate following the November 2015 Paris attacks, the short program standings were accepted as final. As a result, she finished as the second alternate for the 2015–16 Grand Prix of Figure Skating Final and could not defend her title. Tuktamysheva finished first in the 2015–16 ISU Challenger Series standings after winning gold medals at the 2015 Warsaw Cup and at the 2015 Golden Spin of Zagreb with a season's best score of 201.33 points. After the Warsaw Cup, Tuktamysheva decided to switch back to her Boléro short program from the previous season. At the 2016 Russian Championships, she finished eighth after placing ninth in the short and sixth in the free skate. She was named as an alternate for the 2016 European Championships.

Tuktamysheva was invited to the 2016 Team Challenge Cup but withdrew due to an ankle injury.

==== 2016–2017 season ====
Tuktamysheva began her season competing at the 2016 CS Nebelhorn Trophy, where she won the silver medal after placing first in the short and second in the free skate. She then competed at the 2016 CS Finlandia Trophy, where she placed fourth. In her Grand Prix events, she placed third at 2016 Cup of China and fourth at 2016 Skate Canada International. After her Grand Prix events, she competed at one more Challenger event, 2016 CS Golden Spin of Zagreb, where she won the silver medal.

At the 2017 Russian Championships, Tuktamysheva finished 8th. In February 2017, she competed at the 2017 Winter Universiade, where she placed fourth.

==== 2017–2018 season ====
Tuktamysheva started her season by competing in two Challenger events. First, she competed at the 2017 CS Lombardia Trophy, where she placed sixth, and then she skated at the 2017 CS Finlandia Trophy, where she won the bronze medal. In her Grand Prix events, she placed 7th at the 2017 Cup of China and ninth at the 2017 Internationaux de France. After the Grand Prix events, she skated her third Challenger event of the season at the 2017 CS Golden Spin of Zagreb, where she won the bronze medal.

At the 2018 Russian Championships Tuktamysheva finished seventh.

==== 2018–2019 season: Comeback ====
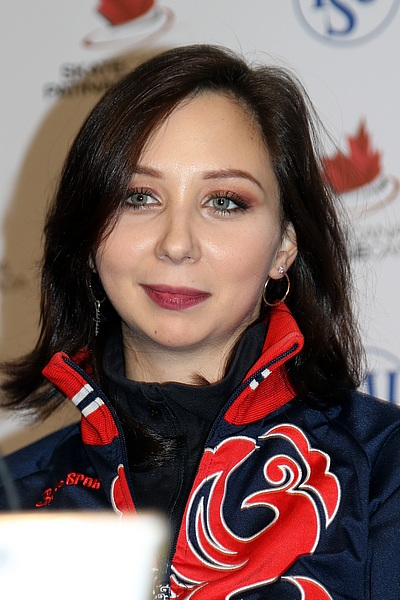
Tuktamysheva at the 2018 Skate Canada

In the summer before the start of the 2018–19 season, Tuktamysheva began training both the triple Axel and the triple Lutz-triple toe loop combination again with the intention of adding both components back into her programs in competition. She started her season in September at the 2018 Lombardia Trophy, where she won the gold medal by a margin of over 21 points over the silver medalist, her training mate Sofia Samodurova, after placing first in both the short program and the free skate. During her free skate, she landed a fully rotated triple Axel but stepped out of the landing and received a negative GOE for the jump. Nevertheless, Tuktamysheva's final score of 206.07 was her best result since the 2014-2015 season.

At the 2018 Finlandia Trophy, Tuktamysheva again won gold after placing first in both segments. She attempted the triple Axel in her free skate and her short program for the first time in competition. Both attempts were ratified as fully rotated but received negative grades of execution (GOE) due to three turnouts of the landings of both jumps.

Tuktamysheva competed at her first Grand Prix assignment, 2018 Skate Canada International, at the end of October. She won the competition by a narrow margin of just 0.26 points over silver medalist Mako Yamashita after a costly fall on her triple Axel in the free skate opened the door for the rest of the field. She placed first in the short program with a new season's best of 74.22, landing her triple Axel cleanly for the first time this season, and third in free skate behind Yamashita and Russian teammate Evgenia Medvedeva. During the gala exhibition portion of the competition, Tuktamysheva performed a controversial program to Toxic by Britney Spears, where she stripped down to her bra partway through the performance. The program was received with a combination of shock and fanfare.

In early November, Tuktamysheva competed at her second Grand Prix assignment, 2018 NHK Trophy, where she won the bronze medal behind Japanese skaters Rika Kihira and Satoko Miyahara. She scored personal bests in both the free skate (142.85) and overall, with 219.02 points. She ranked first in the short program but dropped to third in the free skate. Though she landed fully rotated triple Axels in both programs, she had to do a three-turn out of her landing in the free skate and received a negative GOE for the jump. With her gold and bronze Grand Prix medals and 26 qualification points, she qualified to the 2018–19 Grand Prix Final. At the Final, Tuktamysheva returned to the podium with a bronze medal, landing all of her elements cleanly except for the triple Axel in her short program, which was judged underrotated. She expressed satisfaction with having successfully increased her program difficulty in press conferences at the event.

On 12 December 2018, the week before the 2019 Russian Championships, Tuktamysheva was forced to withdraw from the competition after being hospitalized with pneumonia. Russian media outlet TASS reported that her recovery would take two weeks. After Russian Nationals, she was named to the 2019 Winter Universiade team and as first alternate to the 2019 European Figure Skating Championships team.

In February 2019, Tuktamysheva competed at the Russian Cup Final, going head-to-head with countrywomen Evgenia Medvedeva and Stanislava Konstantinova to earn a spot on the Russian 2019 World Figure Skating Championships team. Though she won the free skate, Tuktamysheva placed second overall behind Medvedeva. After several days of deliberation, the Russian Figure Skating Federation's board of coaches named Medvedeva to the team along with Alina Zagitova and Tuktamysheva's training mate Sofia Samodurova. Tuktamysheva was named first alternate. This decision was controversial, with some feeling that Tuktamysheva should have been selected based on her strong season. The skater herself posted on Twitter afterward: "Inside myself still was a little girl who naively believed. You’ve killed her. But I’m a fighter and will return."

On 26 March 2019, Tuktamysheva was named to the Russian team for the 2019 World Team Trophy alongside training mate Sofia Samodurova. At the competition, she set new personal best scores in both programs as well as overall after skating both of her programs cleanly for the first time all season. With both programs cleanly performed, she became the first woman to land twelve clean triple jumps in one international competition. Tuktamysheva finished first overall in the ladies event and earned a bronze medal for Team Russia's collective efforts.

==== 2019–2020 season ====
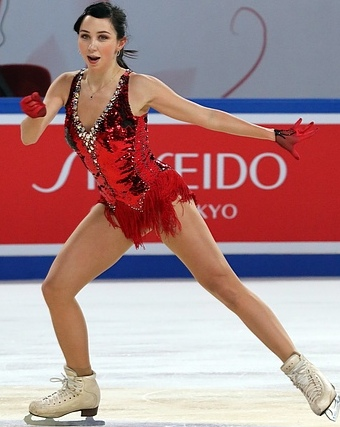
Tuktamysheva at the 2019 Cup of China

Tuktamysheva began training a quad toe loop with the hope of incorporating it into competition at some point in the season. She initially had a short program from Canadian choreographer Shae-Lynn Bourne to Florence + the Machine's "Drumming Song", but decided to change the music while aiming to retain much of the original choreography before the beginning of the season, instead using Astor Piazzolla's tango "Oblivion". She began her season at the 2019 CS Lombardia Trophy where she placed first in the short program and second in the free skate to earn a second-place finish overall behind Russian teammate Anna Shcherbakova. At this event, Tuktamysheva landed three triple Axels for the first time in one competition, incorporating one in her short program and two in her free skate. Tuktamysheva subsequently returned to the "Drumming Song" music for the short program for her next competition, 2019 CS Finlandia Trophy, where she placed second behind Alena Kostornaia.

Beginning the Grand Prix at 2019 Skate America, Tuktamysheva landed her triple Axel in the short program but made errors on both other jumping passes, as well as receiving low spin levels. She was fifth in that segment. She rose to the bronze medal position after the free skate. At the 2019 Cup of China, Tuktamysheva fell on the triple Axel in her short program and performed only a double toe loop as the second part of her combination, placing fourth in that segment. She revived her previous season's free program for the free skate, placing second in that segment and taking a second bronze medal overall. Despite her two bronze medals on the Grand Prix circuit, Tuktamysheva was only the third alternate to the 2019-20 Grand Prix Final behind Satoko Miyahara and Mariah Bell.

On 27 November 2019, Tuktamysheva posted an Instagram video of herself landing a quad toe loop. After winning the Golden Spin event, she skated at the 2020 Russian Championships, placing fourth in the short program despite turning out of her triple Axel and making a spin error. She attempted the quad toe loop in competition for the first time but under-rotated and fell on it, in addition to other jump errors that had her place ninth in that segment but remained in fourth overall. The oldest ladies' skater in the field, Tuktamysheva was named first alternate for the European and World Championships behind a trio of first-year seniors (Anna Shcherbakova, Alena Kostornaia, and Alexandra Trusova).

=== 2020–2021 season: World silver medalist ===
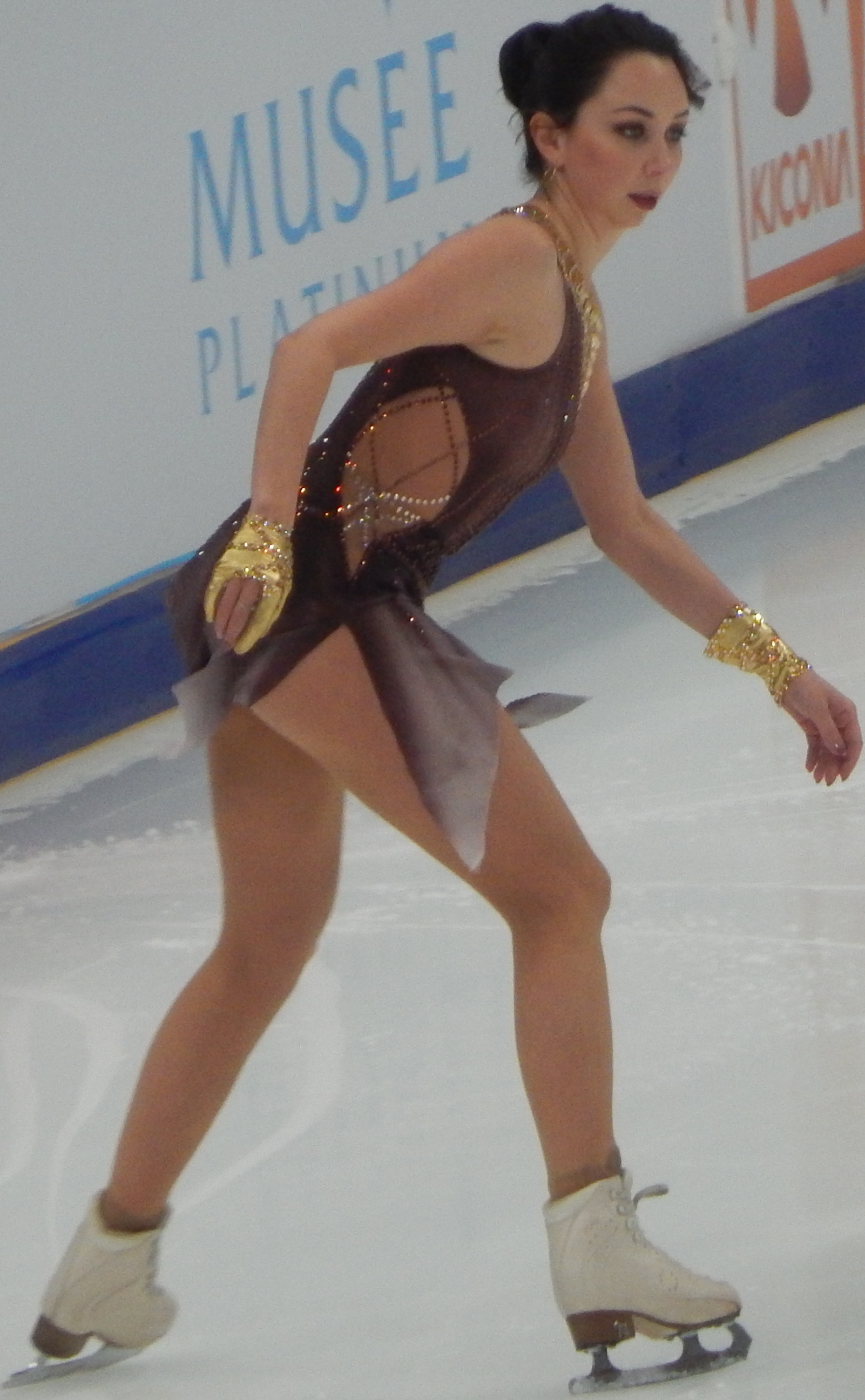
Tuktamysheva at the 2020 Rostelecom Cup

Tuktamysheva appeared at the senior Russian test skates. She opened her tenth senior season at the third stage of the domestic Russian Cup series, the qualifying competition series to the national championships in Sochi in late October. She controversially placed third in the short program behind Daria Usacheva and Anna Shcherbakova despite executing a clean triple axel and in light of a mistake from Shcherbakova on her combination. She remained third in the free program after an imperfect skate to earn the bronze medal overall.

In preparation for the 2020 Rostelecom Cup, Tuktamysheva restored her quadruple toe-loop, which she last performed unsuccessfully at the 2020 Russian Championships. She posted a new video of herself performing the jump on her Instagram account on 17 November 2020 and executed the jump in practices but did not perform it in competition. At the event, Tuktamysheva placed second in the short program behind Alena Kostornaia after executing a clean triple Axel but stepping out of the first jump in her intended combination and only performing a triple Lutz-double toe loop as a result. In the free skate, she executed two clean triple Axels, one in combination, to win the segment and the competition overall, in what was considered a significant upset victory over both Kostornaia and Alexandra Trusova. With the victory, she became only the third woman to win a medal at all 6 Grand Prix events and the Grand Prix Final.

On 3 December, it was announced that Tuktamysheva had to withdraw from the fifth stage of the Russian Cup because she contracted COVID-19.

After recovering from the coronavirus, Tuktamysheva competed at the 2021 Russian Championships. She stepped out of her triple Axel in the short program but cleanly executed her other jumps, placing fifth in that segment. She was tenth in the free after making errors on both triple Axels and doubling a planned triple loop, finishing in seventh overall.

In February 2021, Tuktamysheva competed at the 2021 Channel One Trophy, a domestic made-for-television team competition which split the Russian national team in half to compete against one another in two teams led by captains Alina Zagitova and Evgenia Medvedeva respectively. Tuktamysheva was chosen to represent Medvedeva's team, alongside Alexandra Trusova and Maiia Khromykh, in the ladies event. She debuted a new short program to Billie Eilish and Khalid's "Lovely" and placed sixth of six in the short after popping a planned triple Axel into a single. In the free skate, she overtook Khromykh to finish fifth overall.

Tuktamysheva next competed at the Russian Cup Final, which was widely assumed to be a contest between her and Kostornaia for the third berth on the Russian ladies' delegation for the 2021 World Championships in Stockholm. She placed third in the short program despite turning out of her triple Axel attempt, seven points ahead of Kostornaia, who popped the second half of her combination to a double. In the free skate, Tuktamysheva dropped to fourth place overall, but was the highest-ranked skater eligible for international senior events, sixteen points ahead of Kostornaia in sixth place. As a result, Tuktamysheva was named to the Russian World team on 1 March — her first scheduled trip back to Worlds since winning the title in 2015. She was considered a serious contender for the podium alongside her fellow Russian skaters and Japan's Rika Kihira.

At the World Championships, Tuktamysheva cleanly performed her short program to place third in the segment, behind Anna Shcherbakova and Rika Kihira. In the free skate, Tuktamysheva landed both of her triple Axel attempts cleanly, but fell on a triple flip later in the program. Despite the mistake and placing only third in the free program, she was able to claim second place overall due to mistakes from Kihira and Alexandra Trusova coming back from a major deficit after the short program. She took the silver medal between countrywomen Shcherbakova with the gold and Trusova with the bronze. This was the second time, after the United States with Tonya Harding, Nancy Kerrigan, and Kristi Yamaguchi in 1991, that a single country swept the ladies' podium at the World Championships. Tuktamysheva's placement, combined with Shcherbakova's, qualified three berths for Russian ladies at the 2022 Winter Olympic Games in Beijing.

Tuktamysheva was subsequently named, alongside Shcherbakova, to compete for Russia in the ladies' segment at the 2021 World Team Trophy. On 8 April, she was named as Team Captain. She competed as part of the Russian team for the 2021 World Team Trophy with a second place performance of the short program on the opening day within one point behind Russian teammate Anna Shcherbakova. She finished in third place following the free skate with her combined scores.

=== 2021–2022 season ===
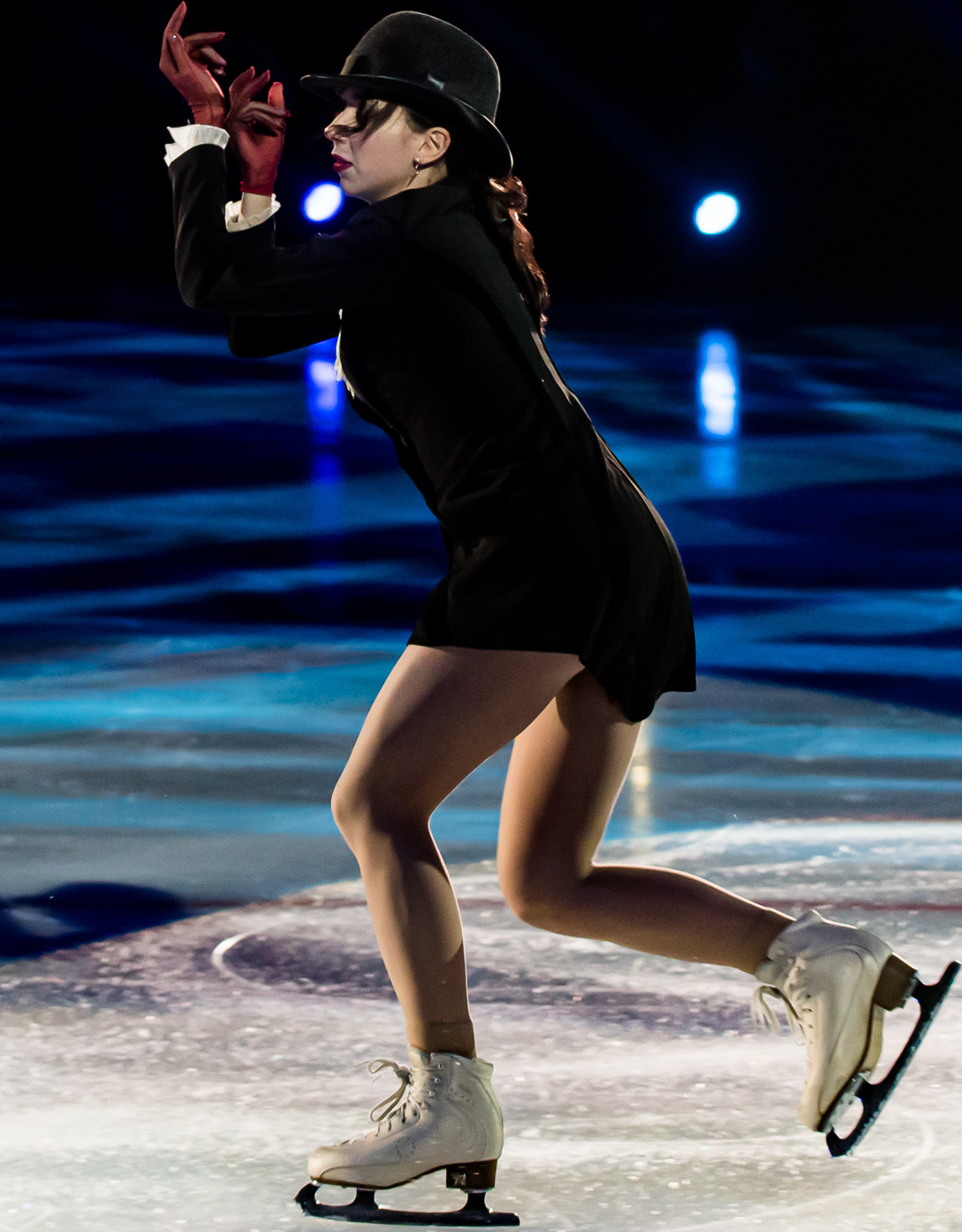
Tuktamysheva at the Union of Champions ice show in April 2022

Tuktamysheva debuted her new programs for the Olympic season at the Russian test skate event in September and officially opened her competitive season in October at the 2021 CS Finlandia Trophy. At Finlandia, Tuktamysheva cleanly skated her short program to score a new personal best and win the segment ahead of Russian teammates Alena Kostornaia and Kamila Valieva. In the free skate, Tuktamysheva again skated a clean program but, unable to match Valieva's technical elements score, fell to second in the segment and second overall.

On the Grand Prix, Tuktamysheva won the silver medal at the 2021 Skate Canada International behind Valieva and ahead of Kostornaia, in a repeat of the podium at Finlandia. At her second assignment, the 2021 Rostelecom Cup, Tuktamysheva again placed second behind Valieva, and due to her placements at both of her events, qualified to the 2021–22 Grand Prix Final seeded third. She said afterward that she was not training a quad at that time, focusing on delivering her triple jump content cleanly. The Final was subsequently cancelled due to restrictions prompted by the Omicron variant.

At the 2022 Russian Championships in December, Tuktamysheva fell on the triple Axel in her short program for the first time all season and doubled the triple toe loop in her intended jump combination, leaving her initially in seventh place. She climbed to sixth in the free program with a clean skate but ultimately finished seventh overall and fourth of the skaters age-eligible to compete at the 2022 Winter Olympics and the season's remaining ISU Championship events. After the free skate, she said, "I did what I could do; now I want some rest."

Tuktamysheva was named as the first alternate to the Russian women's team for the 2022 Winter Olympics on 20 January, missing Olympic qualification for the third time in her career.

=== 2022–2023 season ===
Tuktamysheva and her Russian compatriots were banned from competing in international events indefinitely by the International Skating Union. Therefore, the Russian Figure Skating Federation devised a domestic competition series of its own, modeled off of the ISU Grand Prix series, as a means of qualification to the 2023 Russian Figure Skating Championships and a Russian Grand Prix Final. Tuktamysheva was assigned to compete in the fourth and sixth events in this six-part series and claimed the title at both.

At the Russian Championships in December, Tuktamysheva placed second in the short program and fourth in the free skate to finish third overall behind Sofia Akateva and Kamila Valieva. Her bronze medal finish marked her first podium placement at a national championship since she won the silver medal in the 2014–15 season. In January 2024 it was announced that the Court of Arbitration for Sport had made the decision to strip Kamila Valieva of any and all medals she had won between December 2021 and December 2024 due to a positive doping test. This would include her silver medal at the 2023 Russian Championships, meaning Tuktamysheva was upgraded to the silver medal overall.

=== 2023–2024 season and onwards: Retirement ===
On 22 October 2023, Tuktamysheva confirmed on her Instagram that she would not be competing in the 2023–2024 season.

She did not compete in the 2024–25 season. At the 2025 Russian Challenge competition, Tuktamysheva performed to Asturias by Youn Sun Nah, scoring 28.27 and placing third.

She announced her retirement from competitive figure skating on 24 November 2025. She performed a farewell gala exhibition routine at the 2026 Russian Championships to the song "Hallelujah".

== Post-competitive career ==
Following her retirement, Tuktamysheva began working as an assistant coach to Alexei Mishin. In addition, she became a TV presenter for Russian television, often interviewing both Russian and English-speaking figure skaters.

Tuktamysheva participated at the 2026 Russian Challenge – she finished in twelfth place scoring 27.55 points.

== Programs ==
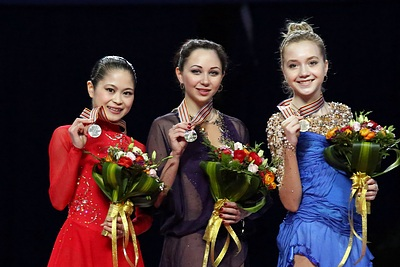
Tuktamysheva at the 2015 World Championships

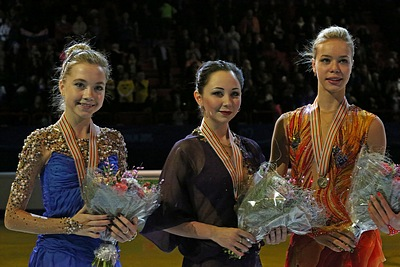
Tuktamysheva at the 2015 European Championships podium

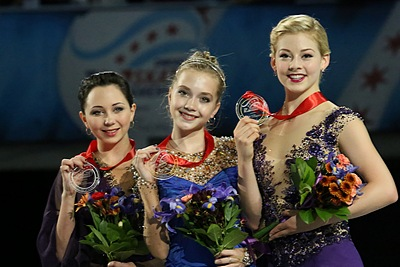
Tuktamysheva at the 2014 Skate America podium

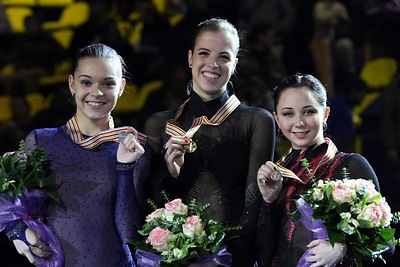
Tuktamysheva at the 2013 European Championships podium

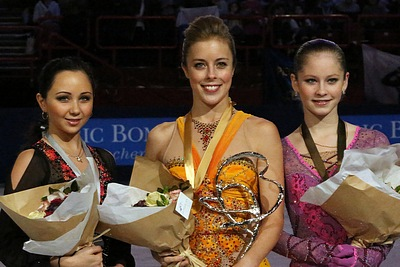
Tuktamysheva at the 2012 Trophée Éric Bompard podium

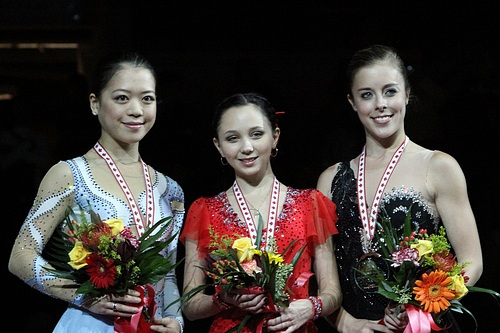
Tuktamysheva with her fellow medalists at the 2011 Skate Canada

Post-Competitive Career Programs

Season	Exhibition
2025–2026	Berghain by Rosalía, Björk, & Yves Tumor, choreo. by Ilya Averbukh; Аллилуйя (Hallelujah) performed by DIVYAROSA; Toxic by Britney Spears
2024–2025	24 Préludes for Piano, Op. 28: No. 4 In e Minor - Largo by Frédéric Chopin, performed by Ivan Moravec; Asturias by Isaac Albéniz, performed by Na Yoon-sun / The Four Seasons: Winter 1 (2012) by Antonio Vivaldi, performed by Max Richter

Competitive Career Programs

Season	Short program	Free skating	Exhibition
2023–2024	Nebo Ya by Sounduk	Loneliness by Igor Krutoy choreo. by Ilya Averbukh	Nebo Ya by Sounduk
2022–2023	Feeling Good performed by Nina Simone choreo. by Tatiana Prokofieva	Loneliness by Igor Krutoy choreo. by Ilya Averbukh	Toxic by Britney Spears
2021–2022	Freedom by Beyoncé choreo. by Adam Solya; Oblivion by Astor Piazzolla performed by Misia choreo. by Ilya Averbukh	Arabia by Hanine El Alam; My Love ... Music (Darbuka Dance Music) by Artem Uzunov choreo. by Nikita Mikhailov	Satine's Entrance (from Moulin Rouge!) performed by Karen Olivo; Toxic by Britney Spears
2020–2021	Lovely by Billie Eilish and Khalid choreo. by Nikita Mikhailov; Adagio of Spartacus and Phrygia by Aram Khachaturian choreo. by Anna Cappellini and Luca Lanotte	Chronicles of a Mischievous Bird by Bhima Yunusov choreo. by Yuri Smekalov	Shallow (from A Star Is Born) performed by Lady Gaga and Bradley Cooper choreo. by Ilya Averbukh; Destination Calabria by Alex Gaudino, feat. Crystal Waters; Drumming Song by Florence and the Machine choreo. by Shae-Lynn Bourne
2019–2020	Drumming Song by Florence and the Machine choreo. by Shae-Lynn Bourne; Oblivion by Astor Piazzolla choreo. by Shae-Lynn Bourne	You Don't Love Me by Caro Emerald; Petite Fleur by The Hot Sardines; Catgroove by Parov Stelar choreo. by Tatiana Prokofieva, E. Grez; Caravan by Juan Tizol and Duke Ellington performed by The Hot Sardines; Utt Da Zay performed by Andrey Makarevich and Yevgeniy Borets feat. Irina Rodiles; Bei Mir Bist Du Schön performed by The Hot Sardines choreo. by Tatiana Prokofieva	Destination Calabria by Alex Gaudino, feat. Crystal Waters; Assassin's Tango by John Powell choreo. by Tatiana Prokofieva, P. Mitriashina; Shallow (from A Star Is Born) performed by Lady Gaga and Bradley Cooper choreo. by Ilya Averbukh
2018–2019	Assassin's Tango by John Powell choreo. by Tatiana Prokofieva, P. Mitriashina	You Don't Love Me by Caro Emerald; Petite Fleur by The Hot Sardines; Catgroove by Parov Stelar choreo. by Tatiana Prokofieva, E. Grez	Toxic by Britney Spears choreo. by Elizaveta Tuktamysheva
2017–2018	Pisando Flores by Ara Malikian choreo. by Adam Solya	Erinnerung performed by Efim Jourist Quartett choreo. by Adam Solya	
2016–2017	Carmina Burana by Carl Orff performed by Jeremy Olive choreo. by Benoît Richaud; Piano Concerto No. 23 by Wolfgang Amadeus Mozart choreo. by Tatiana Prokofieva	Dance of the Sabres by Volker Barber; Peer Gynt by Edvard Grieg; Solveig's Song; In the Hall of the Mountain King choreo. by Stéphane Lambiel; Cleopatra by Alex North choreo. by Emanuel Sandhu	Mambo Italiano by Gérard Darmon
2015–2016	Boléro by Maurice Ravel choreo. by Tatiana Prokofieva; Carmina Burana by Carl Orff performed by Jeremy Olive choreo. by Benoît Richaud	Dance of the Sabres by Volker Barber; Peer Gynt by Edvard Grieg; Solveig's Song; In the Hall of the Mountain King choreo. by Stéphane Lambiel	I Put a Spell on You performed by Jeff Beck ft. Joss Stone choreo. by Stéphane Lambiel
2014–2015	Boléro by Maurice Ravel choreo. by Tatiana Prokofieva	Batwannis Beek by The REG Project; Sandstorm by La Bionda choreo. by Tatiana Prokofieva	Get Low by Dillon Francis and DJ Snake; Koop Island Blues by Koop; Adiós Nonino by Astor Piazzolla choreo. by Stéphane Lambiel
2013–2014	Adiós Nonino by Astor Piazzolla choreo. by Stéphane Lambiel; Gopher Mambo by Yma Sumac choreo. by Tatiana Prokofieva, Anton Pimenov	Malagueña by Ernesto Lecuona choreo. by Jeffrey Buttle	Adiós Nonino by Astor Piazzolla choreo. by Stéphane Lambiel
2012–2013	Adiós Nonino by Astor Piazzolla choreo. by Stéphane Lambiel; Love Story by Francis Lai choreo. by David Wilson	Dark Eyes choreo. by David Wilson	Bésame Mucho (piano and violin version); Caravan ("Mr. Bongo" 1998 album) by Jack Costanzo; Bésame Mucho ("Marvellous" 1994 album) by Michel Petrucciani choreo. by Georgi Kovtun; Adiós Nonino by Astor Piazzolla choreo. by Stéphane Lambiel
2011–2012	Adiós Nonino by Astor Piazzolla choreo. by Stéphane Lambiel	Bésame Mucho (piano and violin version); Caravan ("Mr. Bongo" 1998 album) by Jack Costanzo; Bésame Mucho ("Marvellous" 1994 album) by Michel Petrucciani choreo. by Georgi Kovtun	Harem by R.E.G. Project choreo. by Georgi Kovtun
2010–2011	Harem (from The Casbah) by R.E.G. Project choreo. by Georgi Kovtun	Asturias by Isaac Albéniz choreo. by Georgi Kovtun	In the Closet by Michael Jackson; Harem by R.E.G. Project choreo. by Georgi Kovtun
2009–2010	Solveig's Song (from Peer Gynt) by Edvard Grieg choreo. by Georgi Kovtun	Asturias by Isaac Albéniz choreo. by Georgi Kovtun	Solveig's Song (from Peer Gynt) by Edvard Grieg
2008–2009	Gypsy Dance (from Don Quixote) by Ludwig Minkus	Memoirs of a Geisha by John Williams	Gypsy Dance (from Don Quixote) by Ludwig Minkus; Giselle by Adolphe Adam
2007–2008	Pictures at an Exhibition by Modest Mussorgsky performed by Orchestra of Golden Light	Swan Lake by Pyotr Tchaikovsky	

== Competitive highlights ==
GP: Grand Prix; CS: Challenger Series; JGP: Junior Grand Prix

International
Event	06–07	07–08	08–09	09–10	10–11	11–12	12–13	13–14	14–15	15–16	16–17	17–18	18–19	19–20	20–21	21–22	22–23
Worlds							10th		1st						2nd		
Europeans							3rd		1st								
GP Final						4th	5th		1st				3rd			C	
GP Cup of China									1st		3rd	7th		3rd			
GP France						1st	2nd			5th		9th					
GP NHK Trophy													3rd				
GP Rostelecom Cup								4th							1st	2nd	
GP Skate America								4th	2nd					3rd			
GP Skate Canada						1st	4th			2nd	4th		1st			2nd	
CS Finlandia									1st		4th	3rd	1st	2nd		2nd	
CS Golden Spin										1st	2nd	3rd		1st			
CS Lombardia												6th	1st	2nd			
CS Cup of Austria																WD	
CS Nebelhorn									1st		2nd						
CS Warsaw Cup									1st	1st							
Bavarian Open									WD								
Cup of Nice									1st	1st							
Dragon Trophy													1st				
Finlandia Trophy								3rd									
Golden Spin								3rd									
Ice Star															WD		
Nordics											2nd						
Sarajevo Open										1st							
Winter Universiade											4th		WD				
International: Junior
Youth Olympics						1st											
Junior Worlds					2nd	WD											
JGP Final					2nd												
JGP Germany					1st												
JGP Romania					1st												
Cup of Nice		1st	1st		1st												
National
Russian Champ.		10th	2nd	3rd	3rd	6th	1st	10th	2nd	8th	8th	7th	WD	4th	7th	5th	2nd
Russian Junior Champ.		9th	2nd	4th	1st												
Russian Cup Final (Note: The 2023 Russian Cup Final was renamed as the 2023 Russian Grand Prix Final.)		4th		1st				WD			2nd		2nd		4th		2nd
Team events
Japan Open						2nd T 1st P				3rd T 3rd P							
World Team Trophy							4th T 10th P		2nd T 1st P				3rd T 1st P		1st T 3rd P		

== Detailed results ==
ISU personal best scores in the +5/-5 GOE System
Segment	Type	Score	Event
Total	**TSS**	**234.43**	2019 World Team Trophy
Short program	**TSS**	**81.53**	2021 CS Finlandia Trophy
Short program	TES	45.89	2021 CS Finlandia Trophy
Short program	PCS	35.64	2021 CS Finlandia Trophy
Free skating	**TSS**	**153.89**	2019 World Team Trophy
Free skating	TES	82.15	2019 World Team Trophy
Free skating	PCS	73.22	2021 CS Finlandia Trophy

ISU personal best scores in the +3/-3 GOE System
Segment	Type	Score	Event
Total	**TSS**	**210.40**	2015 European Championship
Short program	**TSS**	**77.62**	2015 World Championship
Short program	TES	44.09	2015 World Championship
Short program	PCS	33.53	2015 World Championship
Free skating	**TSS**	**141.38**	2015 European Championship
Free skating	TES	73.15	2015 European Championship
Free skating	PCS	68.47	2015 World Team Trophy

Small medals for short program and free skating awarded only at ISU Championships. At team events, medals awarded for team results only.

=== Senior level ===
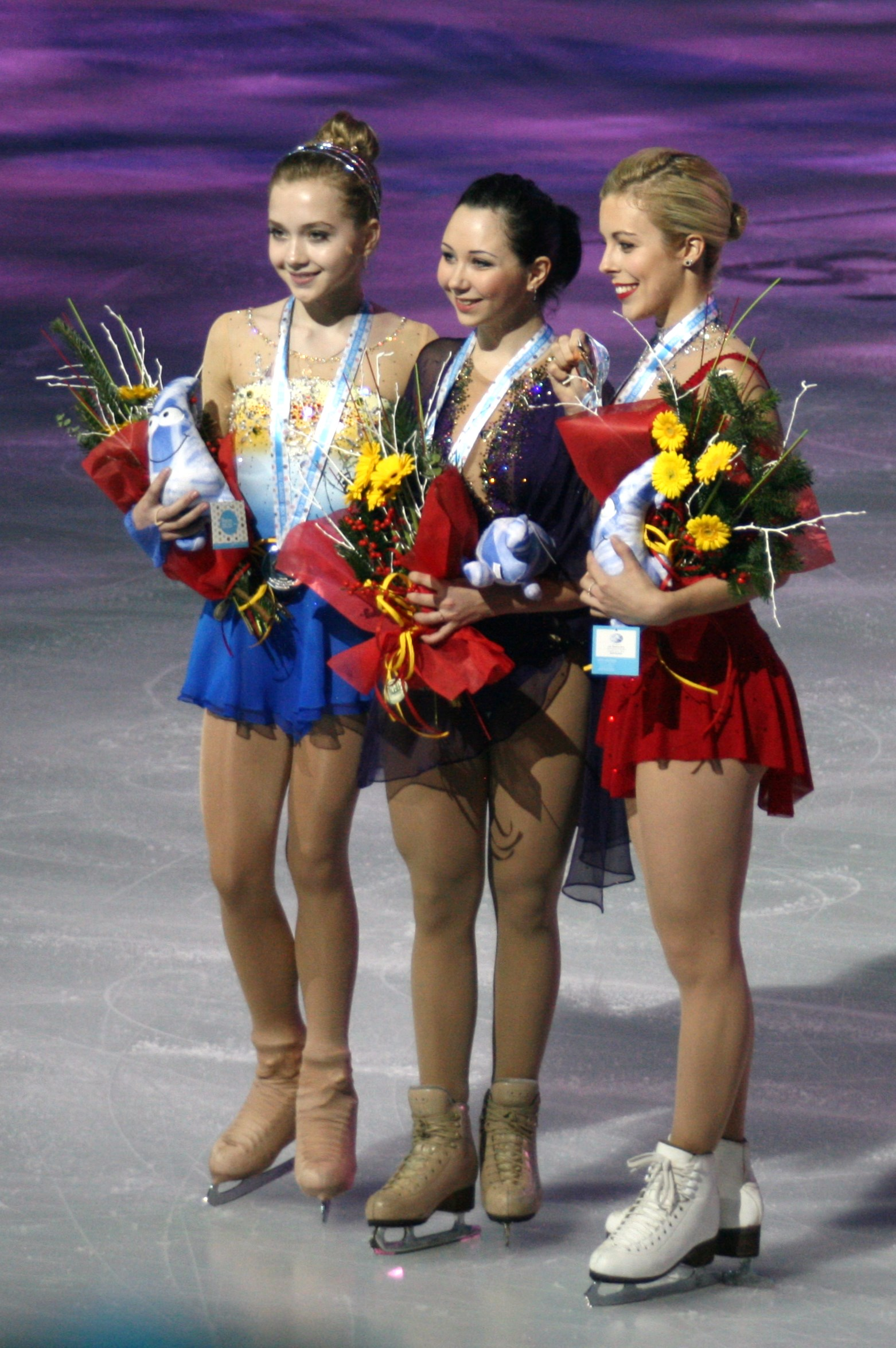
Tuktamysheva at the 2014–15 Grand Prix Final

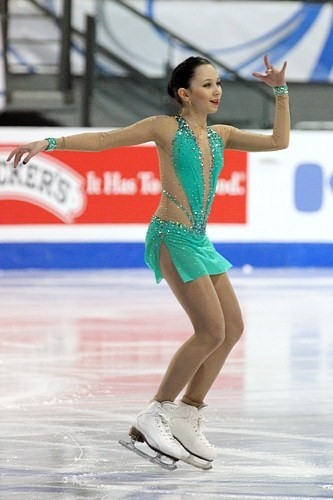
Tuktamysheva at the 2011–12 Grand Prix Final

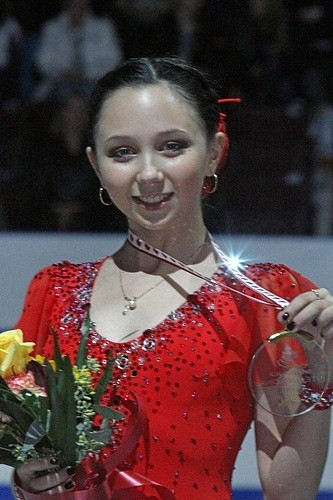
Tuktamysheva at the 2011 Skate Canada

ISU Personal Bests highlighted in bold.

**2022–23 season**
Date	Event	SP	FS	Total
4–5 March 2023	2023 Russian Cup Final	2; 81.09	3; 160.52	2; 241.61
21–22 January 2023	2023 Channel One Trophy	4; 74.32	4; 156.35	2T/4P; 230.67
20–26 December 2022	2023 Russian Championships	2; 82.98	2; 158.74	2; 241.72
**2021–22 season**
Date	Event	SP	FS	Total
25–27 March 2022	2022 Channel One Trophy	3; 81.63	3; 166.23	2T/3P; 247.86
21–26 December 2021	2022 Russian Championships	6; 71.28	5; 153.12	6; 224.40
26–28 November 2021	2021 Rostelecom Cup	2; 80.10	2; 149.13	2; 229.23
29–31 October 2021	2021 Skate Canada International	2; 81.24	2; 151.64	2; 232.88
7–10 October 2021	2021 CS Finlandia Trophy	1; **81.53**	2; 151.77	2; 233.30
**2020–21 season**
Date	Event	SP	FS	Total
15–18 April 2021	2021 World Team Trophy	2; 80.35	3; 146.23	1T/3P; 226.58
22–28 March 2021	2021 World Championships	3; 78.86	3; 141.60	2; 220.46
26 Feb. – 2 Mar. 2021	2021 Russian Cup Final	3; 77.74	4; 148.27	4; 226.01
5–7 February 2021	2021 Channel One Trophy	6; 70.38	5; 150.41	2T/5P; 220.79
23–27 December 2020	2021 Russian Championships	5; 73.56	10; 130.69	7; 204.25
20–22 November 2020	2020 Rostelecom Cup	2; 74.20	1; 148.69	1; 223.39
**2019–20 season**
Date	Event	SP	FS	Total
24–29 December 2019	2020 Russian Championships	4; 75.74	9; 128.89	4; 204.63
4–7 December 2019	2019 CS Golden Spin of Zagreb	1; 72.86	1; 148.29	1; 221.15
8–10 November 2019	2019 Cup of China	4; 65.57	2; 143.53	3; 209.10
18–20 October 2019	2019 Skate America	5; 67.28	3; 138.69	3; 205.97
11–13 October 2019	2019 CS Finlandia Trophy	2; 72.66	2; 139.87	2; 212.53
13–15 September 2019	2019 CS Lombardia Trophy	1; 73.66	2; 140.72	2; 214.38
2018–19 season
Date	Event	SP	FS	Total
11–14 April 2019	2019 World Team Trophy	2; 80.54	1; **153.89**	3T/1P; **234.43**
18–22 February 2019	2019 Russian Cup Final	4; 72.21	1; 148.98	2; 221.19
7–10 February 2019	2019 Dragon Trophy	1; 65.66	1; 122.45	1; 188.11
6–9 December 2018	2018–19 Grand Prix Final	3; 70.65	3; 144.67	3; 215.32
9–11 November 2018	2018 NHK Trophy	1; 76.17	3; 142.85	3; 219.02
26–28 October 2018	2018 Skate Canada International	1; 74.22	3; 129.10	1; 203.32
4–7 October 2018	2018 CS Finlandia Trophy	1; 73.83	3; 129.02	1; 202.85
12–16 September 2018	2018 CS Lombardia Trophy	1; 65.69	1; 140.38	1; 206.07
2017–18 season
Date	Event	SP	FS	Total
21–24 December 2017	2018 Russian Championships	6; 71.07	8; 130.99	7; 202.06
6–9 December 2017	2017 CS Golden Spin of Zagreb	1; 68.47	5; 107.43	3; 175.90
17–19 November 2017	2017 Internationaux de France	11; 53.03	8; 114.62	9; 167.65
3–5 November 2017	2017 Cup of China	5; 67.10	6; 129.58	7; 196.68
6–8 October 2017	2017 CS Finlandia Trophy	1; 67.82	4; 121.31	3; 189.13
14–17 September 2017	2017 CS Lombardia Trophy	6; 58.91	6; 125.84	6; 184.75
2016–17 season
Date	Event	SP	FS	Total
2–5 March 2017	2017 Nordics Open	2; 60.72	2; 117.41	2; 178.13
13–16 February 2017	2017 Russian Cup Final	4; 63.35	2; 134.76	2; 198.11
1–5 February 2017	2017 Winter Universiade	2; 69.01	6; 102.67	4; 171.68
20–26 December 2016	2017 Russian Championships	6; 69.17	10; 125.35	8; 194.52
7–10 December 2016	2016 CS Golden Spin of Zagreb	5; 63.01	1; 129.02	2; 192.03
18–20 November 2016	2016 Cup of China	4; 64.88	2; 127.69	3; 192.57
28–30 October 2016	2016 Skate Canada International	3; 66.79	5; 121.20	4; 187.99
6–10 October 2016	2016 CS Finlandia Trophy	4; 62.99	4; 102.60	4; 165.59
22–24 September 2016	2016 CS Nebelhorn Trophy	1; 65.20	2; 120.73	2; 185.93
2015–16 season
Date	Event	SP	FS	Total
04-6 February 2016	2016 Sarajevo Open	1; 60.67	1; 101.40	1; 162.07
24–27 December 2015	2016 Russian Championships	9; 63.68	6; 131.06	8; 194.74
2–5 December 2015	2015 Golden Spin of Zagreb	1; 69.48	1; 131.85	1; 201.33
26–29 November 2015	2015 Warsaw Cup	1; 64.18	1; 128.75	1; 192.93
13–15 November 2015	2015 Trophée Éric Bompard	5; 56.21	C	5; 56.21
30 Oct. – 1 Nov. 2015	2015 Skate Canada International	7; 55.37	1; 133.62	2; 188.99
15–18 October 2015	2015 International Cup of Nice	2; 59.12	1; 120.11	1; 179.23
3 October 2015	2015 Japan Open	–	3; 128.34	3T/3P
2014–15 season
Date	Event	SP	FS	Total
16–19 April 2015	2015 World Team Trophy	2; 70.93	1; 134.21	2T/1P; 205.14
23–29 March 2015	2015 World Championships	1; 77.62	1; 132.74	1; 210.36
11–15 February 2015	2015 Bavarian Open	1; 66.75	WD	–
28 Jan. – 1 Feb. 2015	2015 European Championships	2; 69.02	1; 141.38	1; 210.40
24–28 December 2014	2015 Russian Championships	2; 73.62	2; 138.73	2; 212.35
11–14 December 2014	2014–15 Grand Prix Final	1; 67.52	1; 136.06	1; 203.58
21–24 November 2014	2014 Warsaw Cup	1; 67.83	1; 128.83	1; 196.66
7–9 November 2014	2014 Cup of China	2; 67.99	1; 128.61	1; 196.60
24–26 October 2014	2014 Skate America	1; 67.41	2; 122.21	2; 189.62
15–19 October 2014	2014 International Cup of Nice	1; 65.15	1; 121.55	1; 186.70
9–12 October 2014	2014 Finlandia Trophy	1; 67.05	1; 126.26	1; 193.31
25–27 September 2014	2014 Nebelhorn Trophy	1; 64.94	1; 127.71	1; 192.65
2013–14 season
Date	Event	SP	FS	Total
24–26 December 2013	2014 Russian Championships	9; 59.81	9; 115.78	10; 175.59
5–8 December 2013	2013 Golden Spin of Zagreb	3; 58.81	3; 110.43	3; 169.24
22–24 November 2013	2013 Rostelecom Cup	5; 60.16	5; 111.71	4; 171.87
18–20 October 2013	2013 Skate America	9; 53.20	3; 123.55	4; 176.75
4–6 October 2013	2013 Finlandia Trophy	6; 52.13	2; 121.32	3; 173.45
2012–13 season
Date	Event	SP	FS	Total
11–14 April 2013	2013 World Team Trophy	10; 49.94	8; 102.22	4T/10P; 152.16
13–17 March 2013	2013 World Championships	14; 54.72	8; 119.52	10; 174.24
23–27 January 2013	2013 European Championships	4; 57.18	1; 131.67	3; 188.85
25–28 December 2012	2013 Russian Championships	1; 69.50	1; 127.07	1; 196.57
6–9 December 2012	2012–13 Grand Prix Final	5; 56.61	2; 117.14	5; 173.75
16–18 November 2012	2012 Trophée Éric Bompard	3; 58.26	2; 121.36	2; 179.62
26–28 October 2012	2012 Skate Canada International	6; 55.10	3; 112.90	4; 168.00
2011–12 season
Date	Event	SP	FS	Total
25–29 December 2011	2012 Russian Championships	7; 58.32	4; 116.08	6; 174.40
8–11 December 2011	2011–12 Grand Prix Final	5; 54.99	2; 119.52	4; 174.51
17–20 November 2011	2011 Trophée Éric Bompard	1; 62.04	2; 120.85	1; 182.89
27–30 October 2011	2011 Skate Canada International	1; 59.57	2; 117.81	1; 177.38
1 October 2011	2011 Japan Open	–	1; 118.59	2T/1P

=== Junior level ===
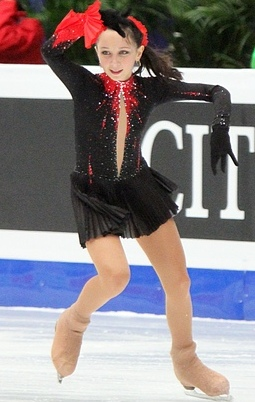
Tuktamysheva at the 2010–11 JGP Final

2011–12 season
Date	Event	Level	SP	FS	Total
13–22 January 2012	2012 Winter Youth Olympics	Junior	1; 61.83	1; 111.27	1; 173.10
2010–11 season
Date	Event	Level	SP	FS	Total
28 Feb. – 6 March 2011	2011 World Junior Championships	Junior	2; 58.60	2; 110.51	2; 169.11
2–4 February 2011	2011 Russian Junior Championships	Junior	1; 60.96	1; 132.60	1; 193.56
26–29 December 2011	2011 Russian Championships	Senior	7; 56.30	3; 124.41	3; 180.71
9–12 December 2010	2010 Junior Grand Prix Final	Junior	2; 53.76	2; 107.11	2; 160.87
13–17 October 2010	2010 Coupe de Nice	Junior	1; 50.52	1; 104.51	1; 155.03
6–10 October 2010	2010 JGP Germany	Junior	1; 57.35	1; 115.43	1; 172.78
8–12 September 2010	2010 JGP Romania	Junior	4; 46.11	1; 86.21	1; 132.32
2009–10 season
Date	Event	Level	SP	FS	Total
3–6 February 2010	2010 Russian Junior Championships	Junior	9; 54.12	4; 104.89	4; 159.01
23–27 December 2009	2010 Russian Championships	Senior	10; 48.96	1; 124.57	3; 173.53
2008–09 season
Date	Event	Level	SP	FS	Total
28–31 January 2009	2009 Russian Junior Championships	Junior	4	2	2; 155.14
24–28 December 2008	2009 Russian Championships	Senior	5; 49.82	1; 110.06	2; 159.88
2007–08 season
Date	Event	Level	SP	FS	Total
30 Jan. – 2 Feb. 2008	2008 Russian Junior Championships	Junior	15	6	9; 118.16
3–7 January 2008	2008 Russian Championships	Senior	14; 35.28	8; 84.37	10; 119.65
