= Aleksandrs Jakushin =

Latvian ice dancer

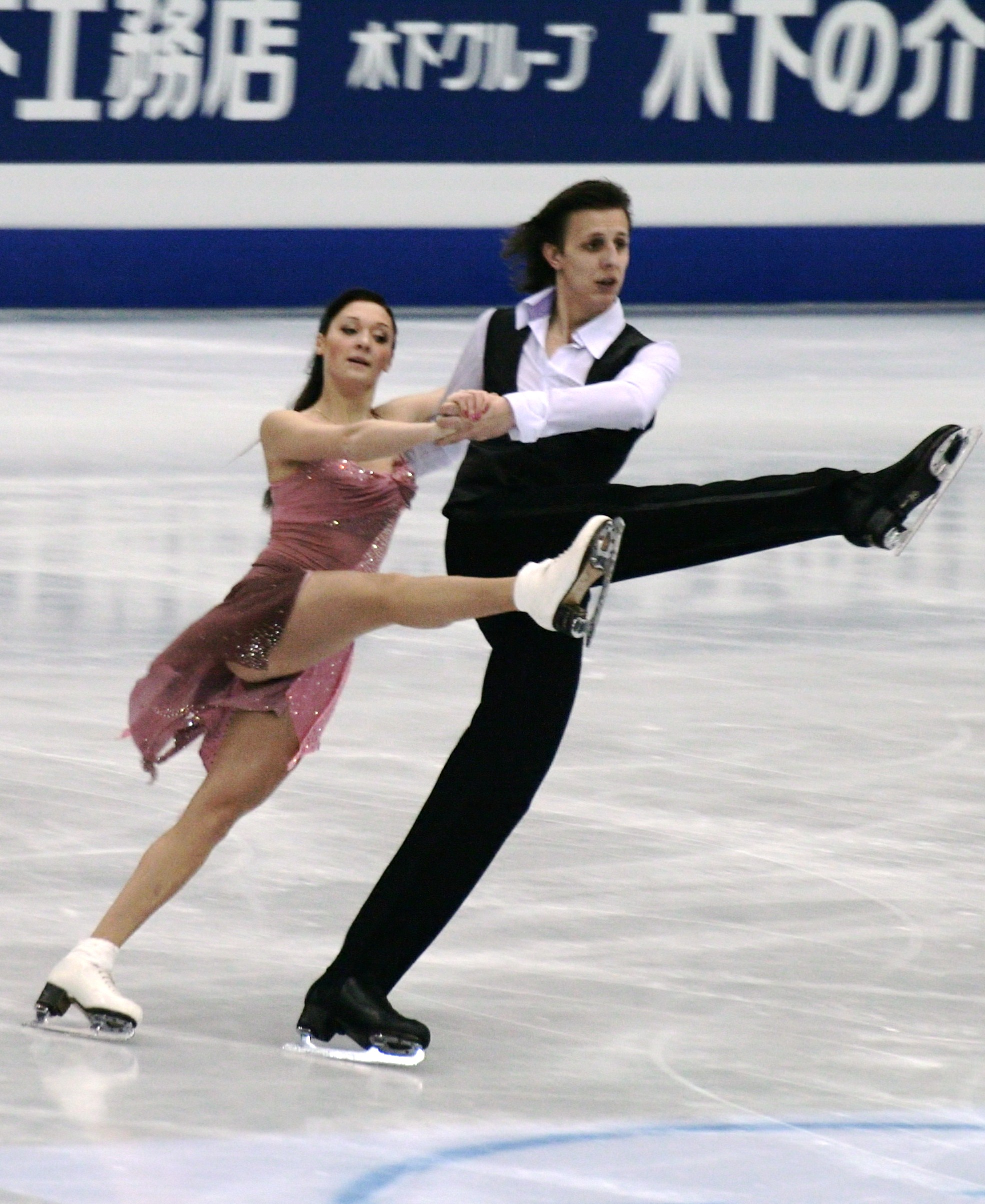

Personal information
- Full name: Aleksandrs Jakushin
- Born: 6 January 1991 (age 35) Saint Petersburg, Russia
- Home town: Jelgava, Latvia
- Height: 1.83 m (6 ft 0 in)

Figure skating career
- Country: Latvia
- Partner: Ksenia Pecherkina
- Coach: Alexander Zhulin; Oleg Volkov; Gennadi Akkerman
- Skating club: Kristal Ice FSC
- Began skating: 1998

Aleksandrs Jakushin (born 6 January 1991 in Saint Petersburg) is an ice dancer who competes for Latvia. With partner Ksenia Pecherkina, he is the 2010 Latvian national champion.

== Programs ==
(with Pecherkina)

Season	Short dance	Free dance
2011–2012	Pasadora by Carlos Santana; Bonita; Bla Bla Cha Cha by Petty Booka	Demain n'existe pas by Igor Krutoy
2010–2011	Once Upon a December (from Anastasia); Quickstep by Big Bad Voodoo Daddy	The Master and Margarita by Igor Kornelyuk
2009–2010	Cha Cha from Dirty Dancing; Bomba Latina	The Master and Margarita by Igor Kornelyuk

== Results ==
=== With Pecherkina ===
Results
International
Event	2009–2010	2010–2011	2011–2012
Worlds			32nd
Europeans			18th PR
International: Junior
Junior Worlds	33rd	17th PR	13th
JGP Austria		13th	
JGP Belarus	13th		
JGP Germany		17th	
JGP Hungary	17th		
JGP Latvia			8th
JGP Poland			7th
Pavel Roman		8th J.	
National
Latvian Champ.	1st		
JGP = Junior Grand Prix; J. = Junior level; PR = Preliminary round

=== With Smirnova ===
Event	2007–2008
Latvian Championships	2nd J
