= Josh Whidborne =

English ice dancer

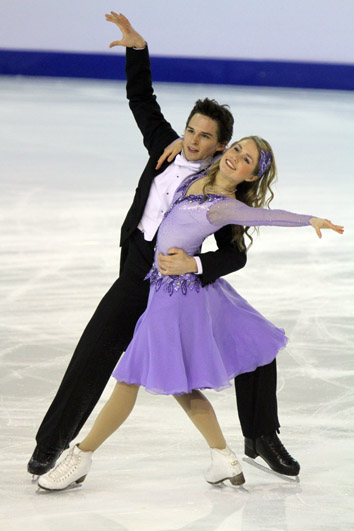
- Aiken and Whidborne at the 2010 Junior Worlds

Personal information
- Full name: Josh Whidborne
- Born: 18 September 1989 (age 36) Reading, Berkshire, England
- Height: 1.80 m (5 ft 11 in)

Figure skating career
- Country: Great Britain
- Partner: Charlotte Aiken
- Coach: John Dunn
- Skating club: Lee Valley London
- Began skating: 2000

Josh Whidborne (born 18 September 1989) is an English ice dancer who represents Great Britain. With his partner Charlotte Aiken, he is the 2012 Ondrej Nepela Memorial bronze medalist and 2012 British national silver medalist.

== Career ==
Whidborne started his skating career in 2005 at the age of 15.

Whidborne teamed up with Charlotte Aiken in 2008, after each won the British solo ice dance championships (what level?). They are coached by John Dunn at Lee Valley in London. They are the 2009/10 and 2010/11 Welsh and British junior ice dance champions. They were members of Deeside Ice Skating Club and Ice Skate Wales. In 2009, they made the decision to relocate to Deeside, North Wales to train with coach Joan Slater MBE and with 2002 Olympian Marika Humphreys-Baranova as their choreographer.

In 2009, they were crowned British Junior Ice Dance champions. In 2010, they earned a place in the British Championships.

In January 2011, they relocated to Madrid, Spain, to train with John Dunn. In 2012, John Dunn relocated with his students back to the UK

In the 2012–2013 season, Aiken and Whidborne won their first senior international medal, bronze at the 2012 Ondrej Nepela Memorial. They then won the silver medal at the 2012 British Championships.

== Programs ==
=== Ice dance with Charlotte Aiken ===
Season	Short dance	Free dance
2012–2013	The Devil Went Down to Georgia by Charlie Daniels Band	Singin' in the Rain by Gene Kelly; Singin' in the Rain remix by Mint Royale
2010–2011	Waltz: Que Sera Sera by Jay Livingstone; Tango: Libertango by Astor Piazzolla	West Side Story by Leonard Bernstein
2009–2010	Scottish folk: Suo Gan; Londonderry Hornpipe	Seisouso – Quidam (from Cirque du Soleil)

== Results ==
=== Ice dance with Charlotte Aiken ===
International
Event	2008–09	2009–10	2010–11	2012–13
Europeans				22nd
Cup of Nice				8th
Nebelhorn				11th
NRW Trophy				5th
Ondrej Nepela				3rd
International: Junior
Junior Worlds		15th	18th	
JGP Germany		11th	11th	
JGP Great Britain			9th	
JGP Hungary		11th		
Bavarian Open			4th J.	
Santa Claus Cup			1st J.	
National
British Champ.	4th J.	1st J.	1st J.	2nd
