= Alexandra Najarro =

Canadian figure skater and Actress

Personal information
- Born: June 3, 1993 (age 33) Richmond Hill, Ontario
- Home town: Vaughan, Ontario
- Height: 1.63 m (5 ft 4 in)

Figure skating career
- Country: Canada
- Skating club: YRSA Richmond Hill
- Began skating: 2000
- Retired: 2014

Alexandra Najarro (born June 3, 1993) is a Canadian former competitive figure skater and Actress. She placed 13th at the 2012 Four Continents Championships.

Shes known for Vought On Ice - "Let's Put The Christ Back In Christmas", she physically played the iconic character of Queen Maeve, while Shoshana Bean did the vocals within a in-universe parody of "The War on Christmas"

== Personal life ==
Najarro was born on June 3, 1993, in Richmond Hill, Ontario, Canada. Fluent in English and French, she also speaks Polish and Spanish, the mother tongues of her parents.

== Career ==
Najarro began skating at age five at the Mississauga Figure Skating Club with her mother Eva as her coach. She appeared in the small role of Snowplow Sam in the 2005 Disney movie Ice Princess.

Najarro won the 2008 Canadian national novice title and began appearing on the ISU Junior Grand Prix series the following season.

Najarro placed fourth at the 2011 and 2012 Canadian Championships. She was selected to represent Canada at the 2012 Four Continents Championships in Colorado Springs, Colorado; she placed 14th in the short program, 12th in the free skate, and 13th overall.

Najarro did not compete in the 2012–13 season. She placed sixth at the 2014 Canadian Championships.

== Programs ==
| Season | Short program | Free skating |
|---|---|---|
| 2011–12 | Waltz No. 2 by Dmitri Shostakovich; Tritsch-Tratsch-Polka by Johann Strauss II | Otonal by Raúl Di Blasio; Pas d'action - Second Dance of the Queen (from Swan Lake) by Pyotr Ilyich Tchaikovsky; Black Swan by Clint Mansell and Tchaikovsky; Perfection; Night of Terror; A Swan is Born |
| 2010–11 | Waltz No. 2 by Dmitri Shostakovich; Tritsch-Tratsch-Polka by Johann Strauss II | Otonal by Raúl Di Blasio |
| 2009–10 | Peter Gunn by Henry Mancini | Charade; Two For the Road; Moon River by Henry Mancini |

== Competitive highlights ==
JGP: Junior Grand Prix

International
| Event | 07–08 | 08–09 | 09–10 | 10–11 | 11–12 | 12–13 | 13–14 |
|---|---|---|---|---|---|---|---|
| Four Continents | | | | | 13th | | |
International: Junior or novice
| Junior Worlds | | | | 25th | | | |
| JGP Australia | | | | | 11th | | |
| JGP Belarus | | | 10th | | | | |
| JGP Czech Rep. | | 7th | | | | | |
| JGP Romania | | | | 10th | | | |
| JGP United Kingdom | | 5th | | 7th | | | |
| Merano Cup | 6th N | | | | | | |
National
| Canadian Champ. | 1st N | 8th J | 15th | 4th | 4th | | 6th |
Levels: N = Novice; J = Junior
