= Charlotte Aiken =

English ice dancer (born 1992)

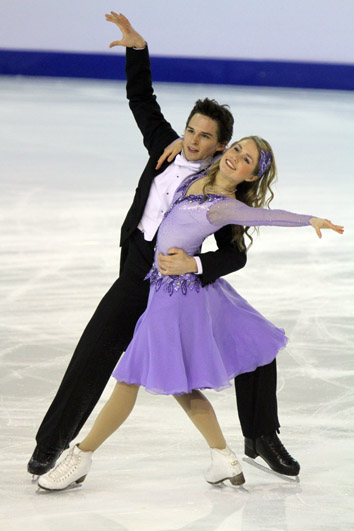
- Charlotte Aiken and Josh Whidborne at the 2010 World Junior Championships

Personal information
- Full name: Charlotte Aiken
- Born: 23 January 1992 (age 34) Plymouth, England, United Kingdom
- Height: 1.70 m (5 ft 7 in)

Figure skating career
- Country: Great Britain
- Discipline: Ice dance
- Partner: Josh Whidborne
- Began skating: 1996

Medal record
British Championships
Silver medal – second place	2013 Sheffield	Ice dance

Charlotte Aiken (born 23 January 1992 in Plymouth, Devon) is an English ice dancer who represented Great Britain. With her partner Josh Whidborne, she was a two-time junior national champion; 2012 Ondrej Nepela Memorial bronze medalist; and 2012 British national silver medalist.

== Career ==
Aiken teamed up with Whidborne in 2008. They were coached by John Dunn at Lee Valley in London. In 2009, they made the decision to relocate to Deeside in North Wales to train with coach Joan Slater and with the 2002 Olympian Marika Humphreys-Baranova as their choreographer. In January 2011, they relocated to Madrid, Spain, to train with John Dunn. In 2012, Dunn relocated with his students back to the UK.

In 2010, Aiken and Whidborne won the British Junior Championships for the second time.

In the 2012–2013 season, Aiken and Whidborne won their first senior international medal, bronze at the 2012 Ondrej Nepela Memorial. They then won the silver medal at the 2012 British Championships.

== Personal life ==
Aiken is from Albury near Guildford in Surrey. Her younger brother, Henry, also competed in ice dancing. When Charlotte was 15 and Henry was 11, they both came in first at the British Solo Ice Dance Championships, in the Junior Ladies and Novice Men's classes.

== Programs ==
=== Ice dance with Joshua Whidborne ===
Season	Short dance	Free dance
2012–2013	The Devil Went Down to Georgia by Charlie Daniels Band	Singin' in the Rain by Gene Kelly; Singin' in the Rain remix by Mint Royale
2010–2011	Waltz: Que Sera Sera by Jay Livingstone; Tango: Libertango by Astor Piazzolla	West Side Story by Leonard Bernstein
	Original dance	
2009–2010	Scottish folk: Suo Gan; Londonderry Hornpipe	Seisouso - Quidam (from Cirque du Soleil)

== Competitive highlights ==
=== Ice dance with Joshua Whidborne ===
International
Event	2008–09	2009–10	2010–11	2012–13	2013–14
Europeans				22nd	
Cup of Nice				8th	
Ice Challenge					12th
Nebelhorn				11th	
NRW Trophy				5th	
Ondrej Nepela				3rd	
International: Junior
Junior Worlds		15th	18th		
JGP Germany		11th	11th		
JGP Great Britain			9th		
JGP Hungary		11th			
Bavarian Open			4th J.		
Santa Claus Cup			1st J.		
National
British Champ.	4th J.	1st J.	1st J.	2nd	
