= Mimi Tanasorn Chindasook =

Thai figure skater

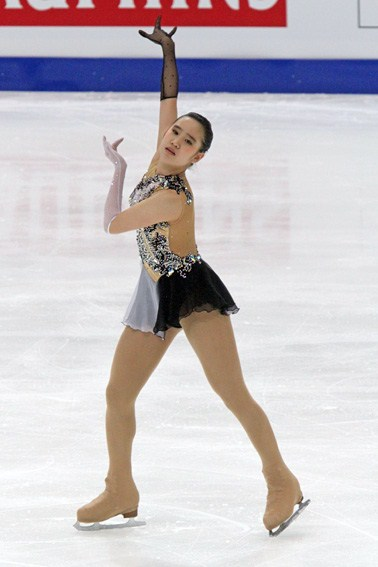
- Chindasook in 2011

Personal information
- Born: February 7, 1995 (age 31) Bangkok, Thailand
- Height: 1.58 m (5 ft 2 in)

Figure skating career
- Country: Thailand
- Coach: Frank Carroll; An Longhe; Rafael Arutyunyan
- Skating club: Figure and Speed Skating Association
- Began skating: 2001

Mimi Tanasorn Chindasook (born February 7, 1995, in Bangkok, Thailand) is a Thai figure skater. She is a four-time Thai national champion and qualified to the free skate at two Four Continents Championships.

== Programs ==
Season	Short program	Free skating
2012–2013	Narvara	The Mission by Ennio Morricone
2011–2012	The Chairman's Waltz (from Memoirs of a Geisha) by John Williams	The Mission by Ennio Morricone
2010–2011	The Chairman's Waltz (from Memoirs of a Geisha) by John Williams	Tango de los Exilados by Walter Taieb performed by Vanessa-Mae
2009–2010	Piano Concerto No. 3 by Sergei Rachmaninov	Tango de los Exilados by Walter Taieb performed by Vanessa-Mae

== Competitive highlights ==
JGP: Junior Grand Prix

International
Event	08–09	09–10	10–11	11–12	12–13
World Champ.				36th	
Four Continents Champ.			19th	18th	
Asian Games			9th		
Bavarian Open					29th
Cup of Nice					17th
NRW Trophy					30th
Triglav Trophy			13th		
U.S. Classic					11th
International: Junior
World Junior Champ.	30th	29th	40th		
JGP Czech Republic			21st		
JGP Italy				19th	
JGP Japan			12th		
JGP South Africa	21st				
JGP Spain	24th				
JGP Turkey		15th			
Asian Trophy			2nd J		
National
Thailand Champ.	1st	1st	1st		1st
J = Junior level
