= List of Toronto Maple Leafs broadcasters =

As a result of both Bell Canada and Rogers Communications having an ownership stake in MLSE, Maple Leafs broadcasts are split between the two media companies; with regional TV broadcasts split between Rogers' Sportsnet Ontario and Bell's TSN4. Colour commentary for Bell's television broadcasts is performed by Mike Johnson, while play-by-play is provided by Gord Miller. Colour commentary for Rogers' television broadcasts is performed by Craig Simpson, while play-by-play is provided by Chris Cuthbert.

== Television ==
On Saturday nights, the Toronto Maple Leafs have always been on CBC's Hockey Night in Canada. Bill Hewitt did the play-by-play on most, but not all games through 1980–81. Bob Cole did numerous Maple Leafs games starting in 1973–74, and most Maple Leafs games starting in 1981–82. Maple Leafs road games were televised on the Telemeter pay TV service for four years starting on February 28, 1960, when Bill Hewitt and Bob Wolff did the inaugural telecast from New York's Madison Square Garden. Until 1961, only Sunday games were shown and in 1961–62 and 1962–63, Bill Hewitt did play-by-play on all road games played in the United States.

The Maple Leafs appeared on television on Wednesdays starting in 1960, with Bill Hewitt on play-by-play. CFTO aired midweek Maple Leafs games, either independently or as part of CTV's Wednesday night Hockey Night in Canada broadcasts, starting from the station's inception in 1960 all the way to 1976–77. Then CHCH in Hamilton broadcast them from 1977–78 to 1987–88. Then the Global Television Network, which operated solely in Ontario at the time, broadcast midweek Leafs games into the late 1990s.

In 1981–82, following Bill Hewitt's sudden retirement, various combinations worked these games. Normally, either Mickey Redmond or Gary Dornhoefer served on colour commentary with play-by-play provided from Dave Hodge, Danny Gallivan, or Dan Kelly. Jim Hughson did play-by-play for the Wednesday games from 1982–86, with Redmond, Dornhoefer, or Gary Green, and Brad Selwood joins the crew on the fourth. In 1986–87, Harry Neale joined Selwood became the mid-week color commentator, and play-by-play was done by either Peter Maher, Bruce Buchanan, or Erik Tomas. Scotty Bowman and Selwood also fill-in for Neale when needed. In 1988–89, Joe Bowen did play-by-play on midweek TV games thru 1994–95. From 1995–97, Jiggs McDonald did play-by-play before Bowen's return to TV the following season. When Bowen was doing TV, radio play-by-play was done by Ken Daniels thru 1994–95 and Dennis Beyak starting in 1997–98.

Through the 2000s, select games were aired on team owned Leafs TV. The Leafs TV package of games ended when MLSE was bought by Bell Canada and Rogers Communications moving the games to Sportsnet Ontario and TSN.

- Foster Hewitt: Lead Play-by-play: (1952–58); Colour commentator (1958–61)
- Bill Hewitt: Lead Play-by-play (1958–81)
- Brian McFarlane: Color commentator (1965–69, 1973–80)
- Bob Goldham: Color commentator (1969–77)
- Danny Gallivan: Rotating play-by-play (1981–82)
- Dave Hodge: Rotating play-by-play (1981–82)
- Dan Kelly: Rotating play-by-play (1981–82)
- Jim Hughson: Lead play-by-play (1982–86)
- Bruce Buchanan: Play-by-play (1986–87)
- Peter Maher: Play-by-play (1986–1988 )
- Erik Tomas: Play-by-play (1987–89)
- Brad Selwood: Colour commentator (1985–88)
- Harry Neale: Lead colour commentator (1986–2007); Color commentator (2013–14)
- Scotty Bowman: Colour commentator (1987–90)
- Ken Daniels (Play-by-play, 1988–91)
- Mickey Redmond: Colour commentator (1982–86)
- Gary Dornhoefer: Colour commentator (1982–86)
- Gary Green: Lead colour commentator (1982–86)
- Joe Bowen: Lead play-by-play (1989–95, 1998–2014)
- Paul Romanuk: Play-by-play (2014–18)
- Dave Randorf: Play-by-play (2014–20)
- Greg Millen: Color commentator (2007–2020)
- Gord Miller: TSN lead play-by-play (2014–present)
- Chris Cuthbert: Play-by-play (2014–present; TSN 2014–20; Sportsnet 2021–present)
- Ray Ferraro: Lead colour commentator (2014–22)
- Jamie McLennan: Colour commentator (2014–present)
- John Bartlett: Play-by-play (2018–20)
- Craig Simpson: Sportsnet lead colour commentator (2021–present)
- Mike Johnson: TSN Lead colour commentator (2022–present)

== Radio ==
Like the Maple Leafs television broadcasts, radio broadcasts are split evenly between Rogers' CJCL (Sportsnet 590, The Fan) and Bell's CHUM (TSN Radio 1050). Both Bell and Rogers' radio broadcasts have their colour commentary provided by Jim Ralph, with play-by-play provided by Joe Bowen. Foster Hewitt was the Leafs' first play-by-play broadcaster, providing radio play-by-play from 1927 to 1968. In addition, he provided play-by-play for television from 1952 to 1958, and colour commentary from 1958 to 1961. Originally aired over CFCA, Hewitt's broadcast was picked up by the Canadian Radio Broadcasting Commission (the CRBC) in 1933, moving to CBC Radio (the CRBC's successor) three years later. As the show was aired on Canadian national radio, Hewitt became famous for the phrase "He shoots, he scores!" as well as his sign-on at the beginning of each broadcast, "Hello, Canada, and hockey fans in the United States and Newfoundland." (Note: The Dominion of Newfoundland did not join Canadian Confederation until March 31, 1949. Newfoundland was a separate Dominion of the British Empire from 1907 to 1949.)

- Foster Hewitt: Play-by-play (1923–68)
- Bill Hewitt: Colour commentator (1958–61)
- Ron Hewat: Colour commentator (1966–68); Play-by-play (1968–77, 1980–82)
- Peter Maher: Play-by-play (1977–80)
- Red Storey: Colour commentator (1979–80)
- Mike Nykoluk: Colour commentator (1980–81)
- Joe Bowen: Play-by-play (1982–2026)
- Bill Watters: Colour commentator (1985–91)
- Gord Stellick: Colour commentator (1991–95)
- Mark Hebscher: Colour commentator (1995–97)
- Dennis Hull: Colour commentator (1996–98)
- Dennis Beyak: Play-by-play (1998–2011)
- Jim Ralph: Colour commentator (1998–present)
- Dan Dunleavy: Play-by-play (2011–13)
- Jon Abbott: Play-by-play (2013–14)
