= Joe Bowen =

Canadian sportscaster

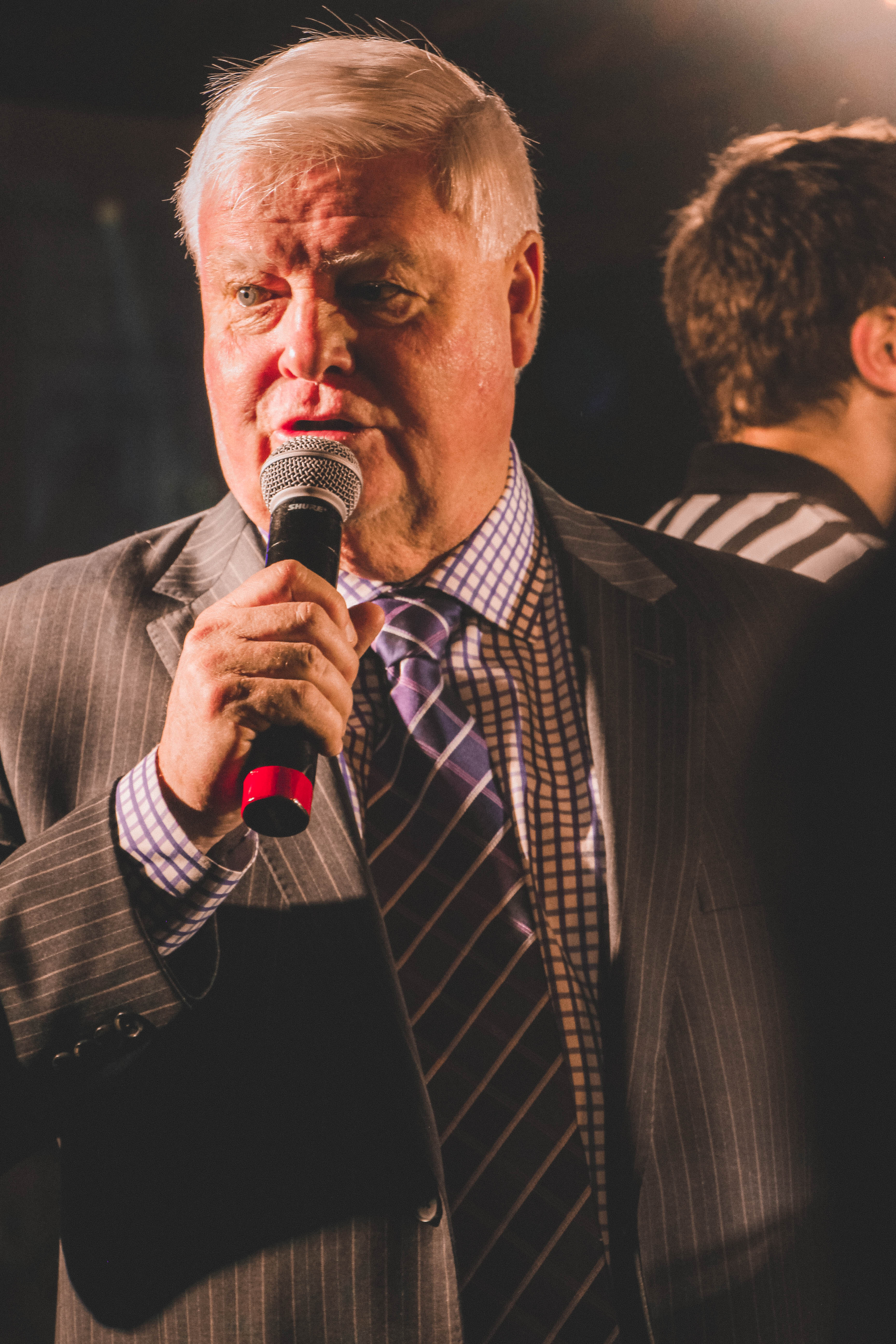
- Joe Bowen speaking at a Sick Kids Charity event in 2019.
- Born: April 5, 1951 (age 75); Sudbury, Ontario, Canada
- Sports commentary career
- Team(s): Nova Scotia Voyageurs (1979–1982); Toronto Maple Leafs (1982–2026)
- Genre(s): play-by-play (television and radio)
- Sport: ice hockey

Joe Bowen (born April 5, 1951) is a retired Canadian sportscaster. He was known as "the voice" of the Toronto Maple Leafs, having broadcast over 3,000 games for the organization. Bowen also did the radio play-by-play on Sportsnet 590 The Fan or TSN Radio 1050 with Jim Ralph.

== Early life ==
Bowen was born on April 5, 1951, and raised in Sudbury, Ontario, Canada. While attending Sudbury High School, he was part of the Copper Cliff Redmen Northern Ontario championship hockey club in 1967. Following his school, he enrolled at the University of Windsor for a degree in communications arts. He chose the institution as it allowed him to complete a degree and still get into broadcasting. During his time at Windsor, Bowen covered university sports on the campus radio station CJAM-FM. Bowen is of Irish descent through his paternal grandfather who emigrated from County Cork.

== Career ==
After graduating from the University of Windsor, Bowen returned to Sudbury where he started his career in radio, covering the Ontario Hockey League's (OHL) Sudbury Wolves. In addition to broadcasting the games, Bowen also held the position of Sports Director at station CKSO, anchoring various sportscasts throughout the day. He spent five years with the Wolves before moving to Halifax in 1979 to announce Nova Scotia Voyageurs games and serve as the sports director for two Halifax radio stations. While in Halifax, Bowen received an offer from Len Bramson to try out for the play-by-play announcer position for Toronto Maple Leafs of the National Hockey League. Following the try-out, Bowen replaced Ron Hewat to become the fifth play-by-play radio broadcaster in the history of Toronto Maple Leafs. Bowen made his debut as the Leafs' play-by-play announcer on October 6, 1982, at the Chicago Stadium. He joined CJCL, the Telemedia flagship station, in 1983 and took over as morning sports anchor and radio voice of the Leafs.

Bowen remained a mainstay in the Leafs' broadcasting booth throughout the 1990s, despite rumours circulating in 1995 that he would be replaced. In 1995, the Telemedia Sports Network lost out in the bidding war for the rights to air the Leafs on the radio to Q107. The new radio station wanted a full-time announcer for its 82 regular-season games and playoffs instead of allowing Bowen to work both radio and TV. He eventually chose to join Q107 instead of Telemedia Sports Network. As the radio station did not allow him to also feature on television, Bowen's former TV partner Gord Stellick was partnered with Mark Hebscher. In 1997, Bowen replaced Jiggs McDonald on 35 mid-week TV broadcasts on Global and ONtv while still maintaining his responsibilities with Q107. In March 2000, Bowen was presented with a gold seat salvaged from the Leafs' former home, Maple Leaf Gardens, in recognition of his longtime support for the Leafs.

He also called several seasons for the NLL's Toronto Rock, beginning in their inaugural season in Toronto in 1999, after one season in Hamilton as the Ontario Raiders. This included the 1999-2002 NLL championship games. Bowen stopped calling Rock games after the 2007 season.

Until 2014, Bowen called Leafs games on television when the games were televised regionally outside of CBC and TSN as radio games were called by Dennis Beyak. After Rogers secured national rights to the NHL, he permanently moved to radio as the televised duties were taken over by play-by-play commentators from TSN4 or Sportsnet Ontario. On March 7, 2017, Bowen called his 3,000th game as Voice of the Leafs, a 3-2 home victory over the Detroit Red Wings.

On June 13, 2025 on social media, Bowen announced his plans to retire following the 2025-2026 season. He retired officially on April 15, 2026 following the Maple Leafs loss to the Ottawa Senators

== Catchphrase ==
Bowen's catchphrase is "Holy Mackinaw!" (also the catchphrase from the Canadian Football League's Hamilton Tiger-Cats), typically used when an amazing goal is scored or a big save is made. It has been suggested that the phrase originated from a California spirit yell, but Bowen claims he got the phrase from his dad who said "Holy Mackinaw" instead of swearing.

== Outside of radio ==
Bowen appeared in a TV commercial for Harvey's promoting the "bigger" Angus Burger, using his famous aforementioned catchphrase, and subsequently provided voice over for several other Harvey's commercials as well. He was the radio announcer in the 1986 film Youngblood.

In June 2018, the Hockey Hall of Fame announced that Bowen was named as the 2018 winner of the Foster Hewitt Memorial Award, honouring outstanding contributions by a hockey broadcaster.
