= Beyak =

Beyak is a surname. Notable people with the surname include:

- Dennis Beyak, Canadian sports broadcaster
- Lynn Beyak (born 1949), Canadian politician
