= Dave Hodge =

Canadian sports announcer (born 1945)

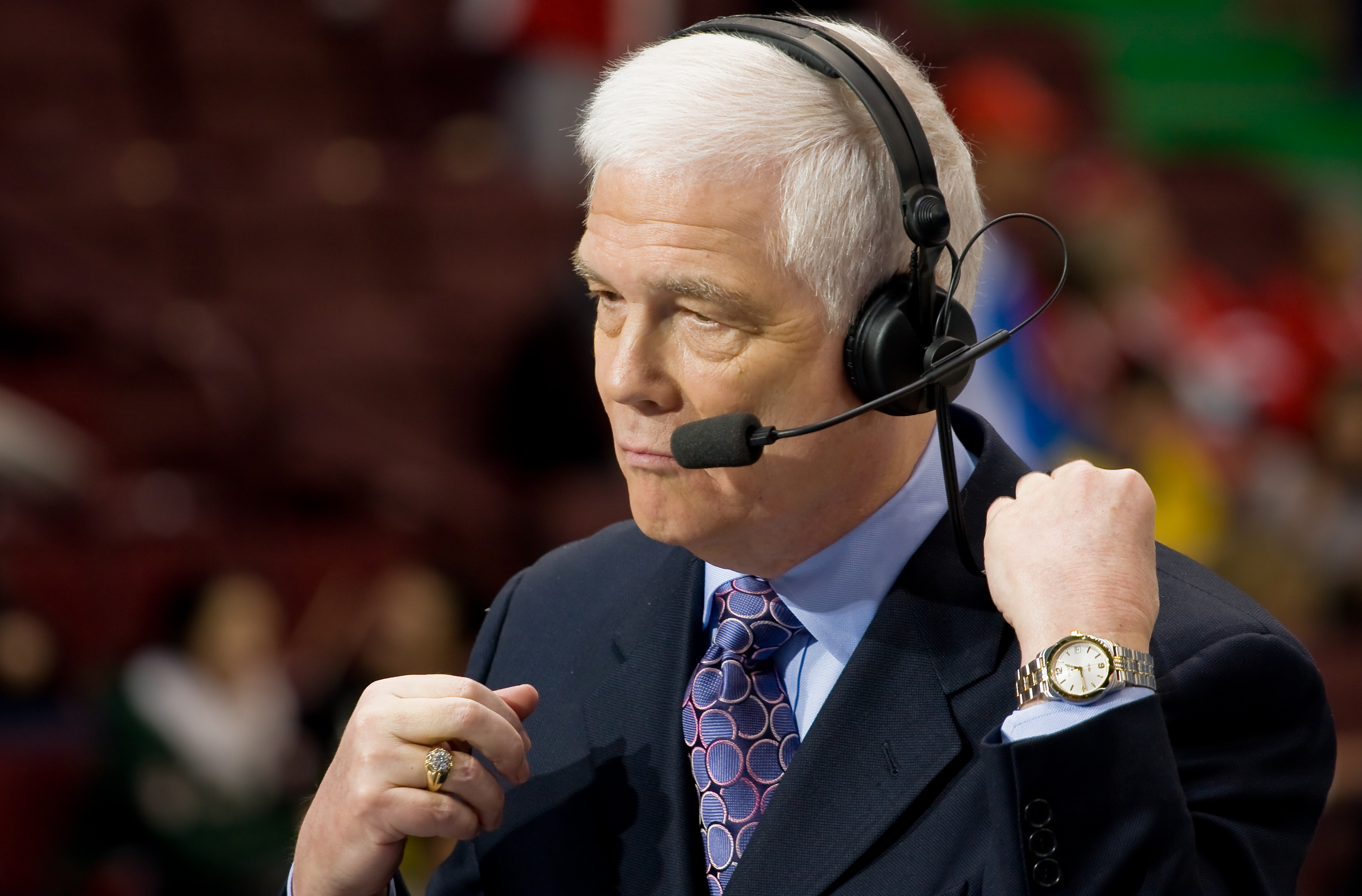
- Hodge during the 2010 Winter Olympics
- Born: January 8, 1945 (age 81); Montreal, Quebec, Canada
- Occupation: sports announcer
- Employer(s): TSN (1992–2017); CBC (1971–1987)
- Known for: Host of CBC's Hockey Night in Canada (1971–1987)

Dave Hodge (born January 8, 1945) is a Canadian sports announcer. Hodge worked for TSN, the CBC and CFRB 1010 radio in Toronto.

== Early years ==
Born in Montreal, Hodge began his career as a sportswriter with the Chatham Daily News in 1965, then on to local radio CFCO in 1966 and on to CFRB from 1968 to 1986.

== Broadcasting career ==
Hodge served as play-by-play announcer for the Buffalo Sabres radio broadcasts in their inaugural season 1970–71, with Ted Darling calling the TV play-by-play. In 1971, he left the Sabres and joined the CBC and radio broadcasts were taken over by Hockey Hall of Fame member Rick Jeanneret until 2022; he beat out Alex Trebek to become the lead host for Hockey Night in Canada from 1971 until 1987, working 15 Stanley Cup Finals. He was often joined in the studio by colourful analysts, such as Howie Meeker and Don Cherry. He also announced the Toronto Argonauts Canadian Football League radio broadcasts from 1974 to 1980.

=== Pen flip ===
On March 14, 1987, Hodge was the in-studio host as the CBC carried a game between the Calgary Flames and Toronto Maple Leafs. The game ended early and the network switched over to a regional game between the Philadelphia Flyers and Montreal Canadiens for the end of the third period. The game was tied 3–3 when the third period ended just before 11 PM Eastern time, meaning overtime would be required. CBC executives decided to cut away after 11:00 and that only viewers in Quebec (who had also seen the game from the start) would get to continue watching. A visibly disgusted Hodge apprised viewers of the situation, concluding his remarks by flipping his pen in the air:

Now, Montreal and the Philadelphia Flyers are currently playing overtime, and, are we able to go there or not?...We are not able to go there. That's the way things go today in sports and this network, and the Flyers and the Canadiens have us in suspense, and we'll remain that way until we can find out somehow who won this game, or who's responsible for the way we do things here. Goodnight for Hockey Night in Canada.

Following the on-air incident, Hodge quit. He was told he could have his old job back if he apologized. He stated that he had nothing to apologize for and took a different job.

=== After the CBC ===
By the time of his termination, Hodge had already moved to Vancouver, where he was working as the sports director of radio station CKNW and serving as the host of Vancouver Canucks radio broadcasts that did not conflict with his CBC duties. He continued to reside in Vancouver and work for CKNW for the next few years.

Afterward, he was hired by Can-West Global to host their coverage of the 1987 and 1988 Stanley Cup playoffs, which included some games in the finals each year. Hodge was then the lead play-by-play broadcaster for the Canadian Football League's league-run Canadian Football Network broadcast service from 1987 to 1990. He returned to hockey as the lead voice of the Minnesota North Stars television broadcasts in 1991, and also hosted regional television broadcasts for the Toronto Maple Leafs on Global and TSN, and for the Canucks on BCTV.

Hodge joined TSN in 1992 and hosted TSN Inside Sports and its spinoff, That's Hockey. He also co-hosted the 1998 NHL Entry Draft.

Hodge hosted a Sunday morning show called The Reporters from 2002 until its cancellation in 2017. He also provided commentary for TSN's NHL coverage.

== Surprise 2018 HNIC appearance ==
On Saturday, November 24, 2018, Hodge made a surprise appearance on the pregame portion Hockey Night in Canada. Notably, it was Hodge's first appearance on HNIC since the "pen flip" incident more than 31 years before. He was invited to appear at the suggestion of present HNIC host Ron MacLean. MacLean, who had replaced Hodge in 1987, interviewed him for about six minutes. Hodge and the rest of the HNIC on-air personalities wore retro sky blue HNIC blazers that would later be sold at auction with proceeds going to the charity Hockey Fights Cancer.

== Awards ==
In 2012, he was given the Brian Williams Media Award.
