= List of Winnipeg Jets players =

This is a list of players who have played at least one game for the Winnipeg Jets (2011–12 to present) of the National Hockey League (NHL). This list does not include players from the Atlanta Thrashers of the NHL.

== Key ==
- * Appeared in a Jets game during the 2025–26 season.

Goaltenders
W	Wins
SO	Shutouts
L	Losses
GAA	Goals against average
OTL ^{a}	Overtime losses
SV% ^{b}	Save percentage

Skaters
Pos	Position	RW	Right wing	A	Assists
D	Defenceman	C	Center	P	Points
LW	Left wing	G	Goals	PIM	Penalty minutes

The "Seasons" column lists the first year of the season of the player's first game and the last year of the season of the player's last game. For example, a player who played one game in the 2000–01 season would be listed as playing with the team from 2000 to 2001, regardless of what calendar year the game occurred within.

Statistics complete as of the 2025–26 NHL season.

== Goaltenders ==
Name	Nationality	Seasons	GP	W	L	OTL	SO	GAA	SV%	GP	W	L	SO	GAA	SV%	Notes
Name	Nationality	Seasons	Regular season								Playoffs					Notes
Laurent Brossoit	Canada	2018–2021; 2023-2024	77	40	24	5	5	2.51	0.917	1	0	0	0	0.00	1.000	
Eric Comrie*	Canada	2016–2019; 2021–2022; 2024–2026	69	33	29	3	3	2.84	0.904	3	0	0	0	1.40	.923	
Connor Hellebuyck*	United States	2015–2026	625	345	208	55	45	2.58	0.916	58	24	34	5	2.90	.903	
Michael Hutchinson	Canada	2013–2018	102	43	39	11	3	2.65	0.910	—	—	—	—	—	—	
Peter Mannino	United States	2011–2012	1	0	0	0	0	0.00	1.000	—	—	—	—	—	—	
Chris Mason	Canada	2011–2012	20	8	7	1	2	2.59	0.898	—	—	—	—	—	—	
Steve Mason	Canada	2017–2018	13	5	6	1	1	3.24	0.906	1	0	0	0	0.00	1.000	
Thomas Milic*	Canada	2025–2026	3	0	1	0	0	3.46	0.871	—	—	—	—	—	—	
Al Montoya	United States	2012–2014	35	16	9	3	3	2.61	0.910	—	—	—	—	—	—	
Ondrej Pavelec	Czech Republic	2011–2017	261	111	107	31	11	2.88	0.904	4	0	4	0	3.73	0.891	
David Rittich	Czech Republic	2022–2023	21	9	8	1	0	2.67	0.901	—	—	—	—	—	—	

== Skaters ==
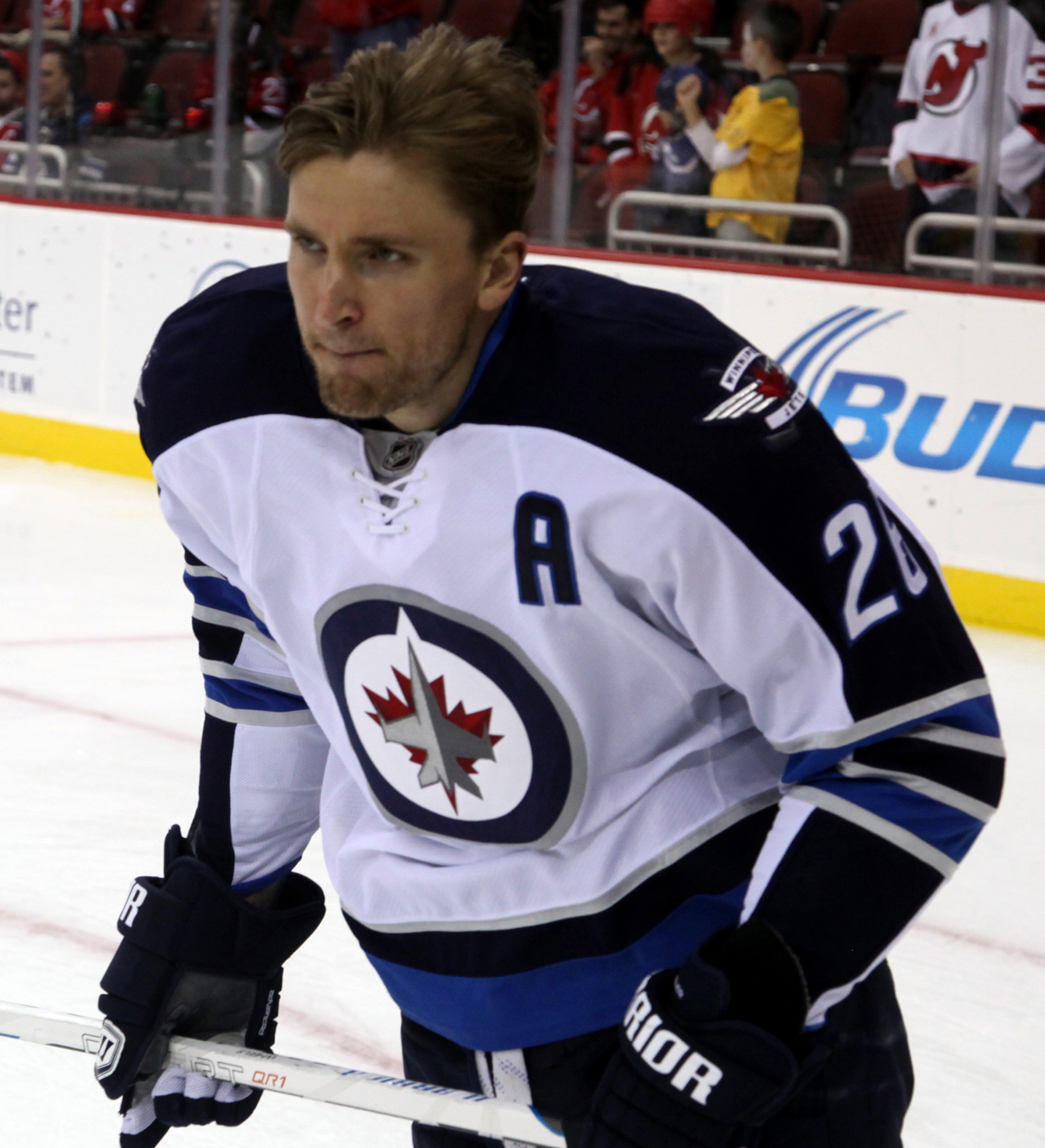
Blake Wheeler was the Jets captain and is their franchise leader in assists and points.

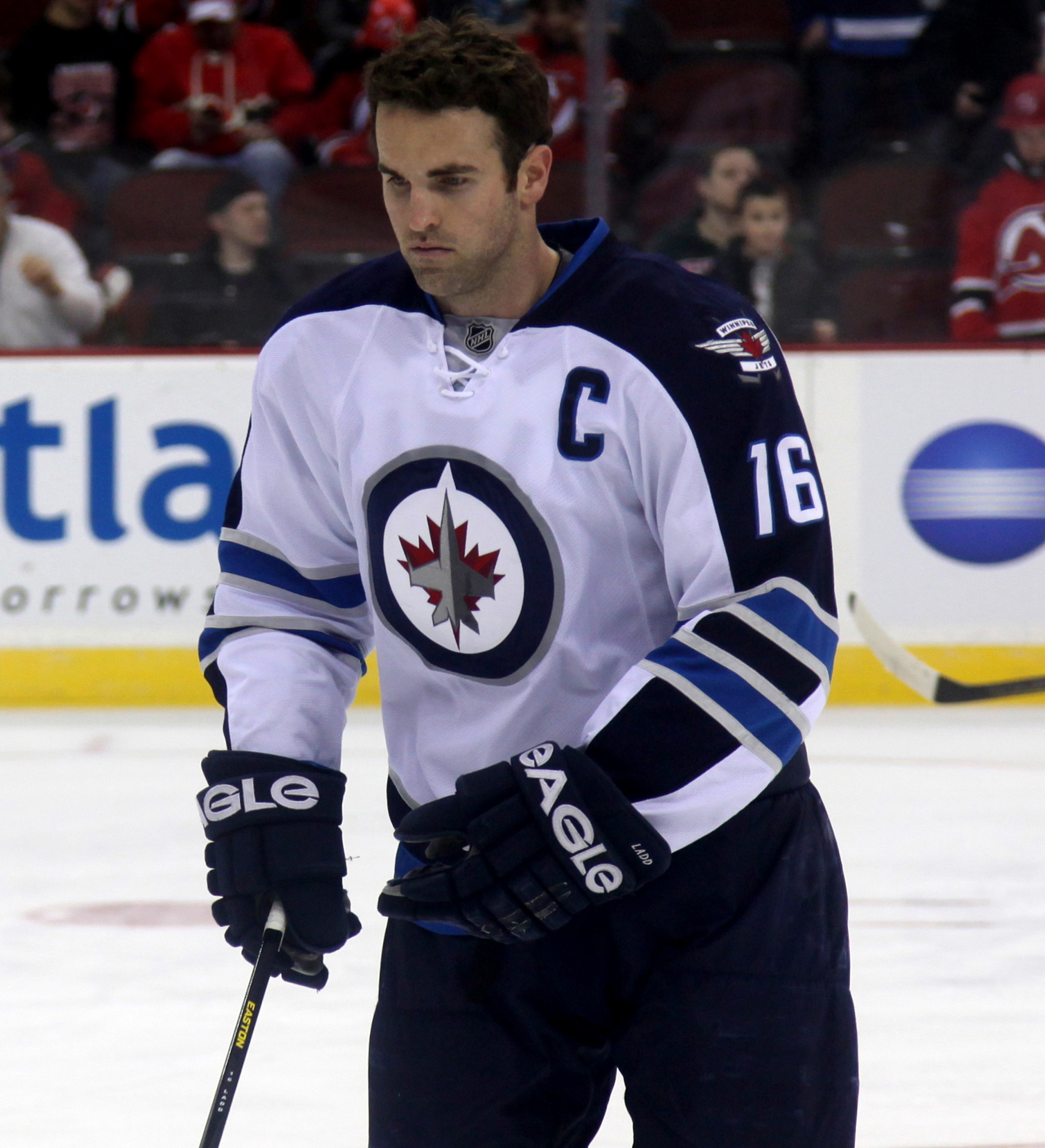
Andrew Ladd was the first captain of the Jets.

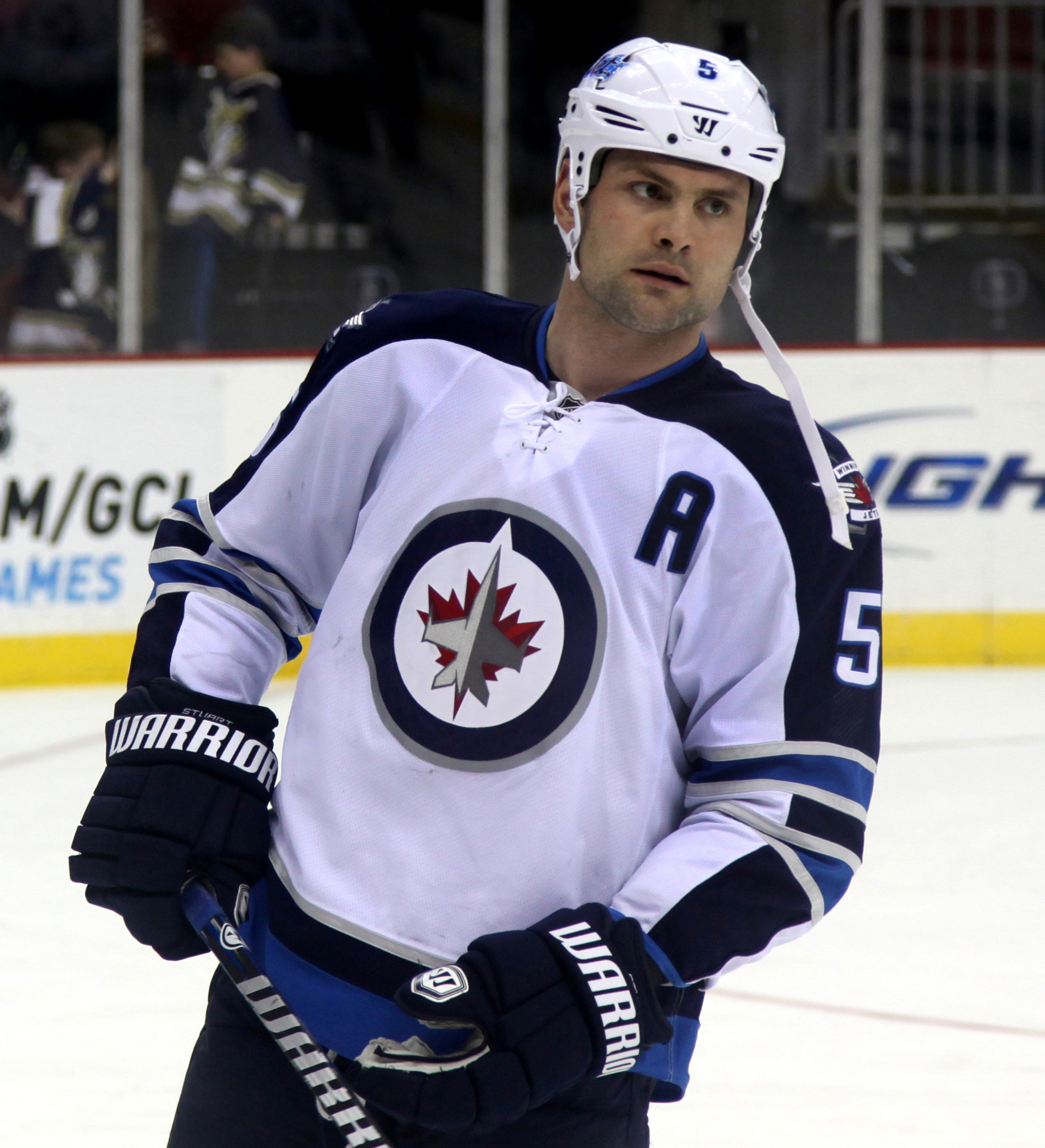
Mark Stuart was the Jets' franchise leader in penalty minutes.

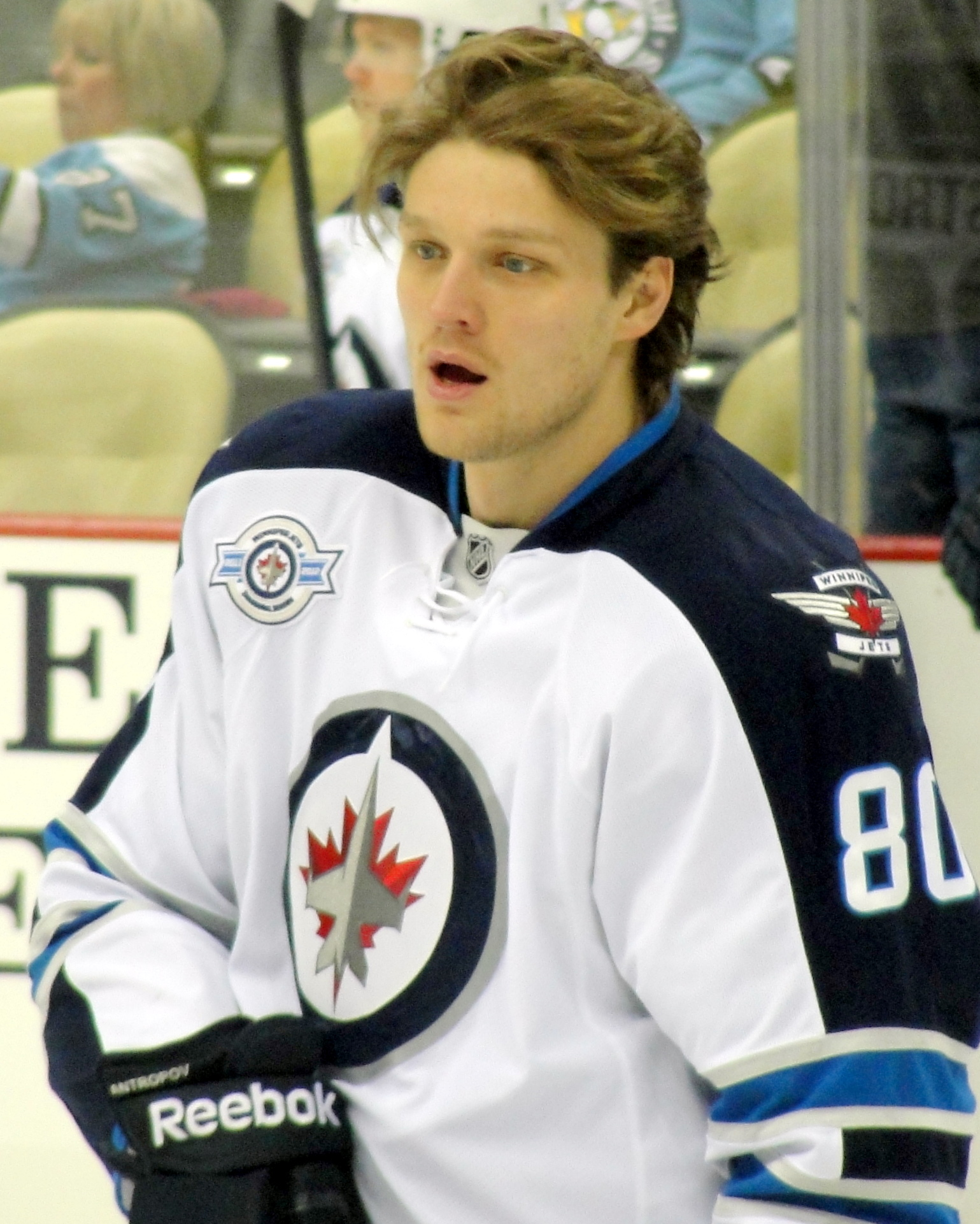
Nik Antropov played two seasons with the Jets from 2011 to 2013.

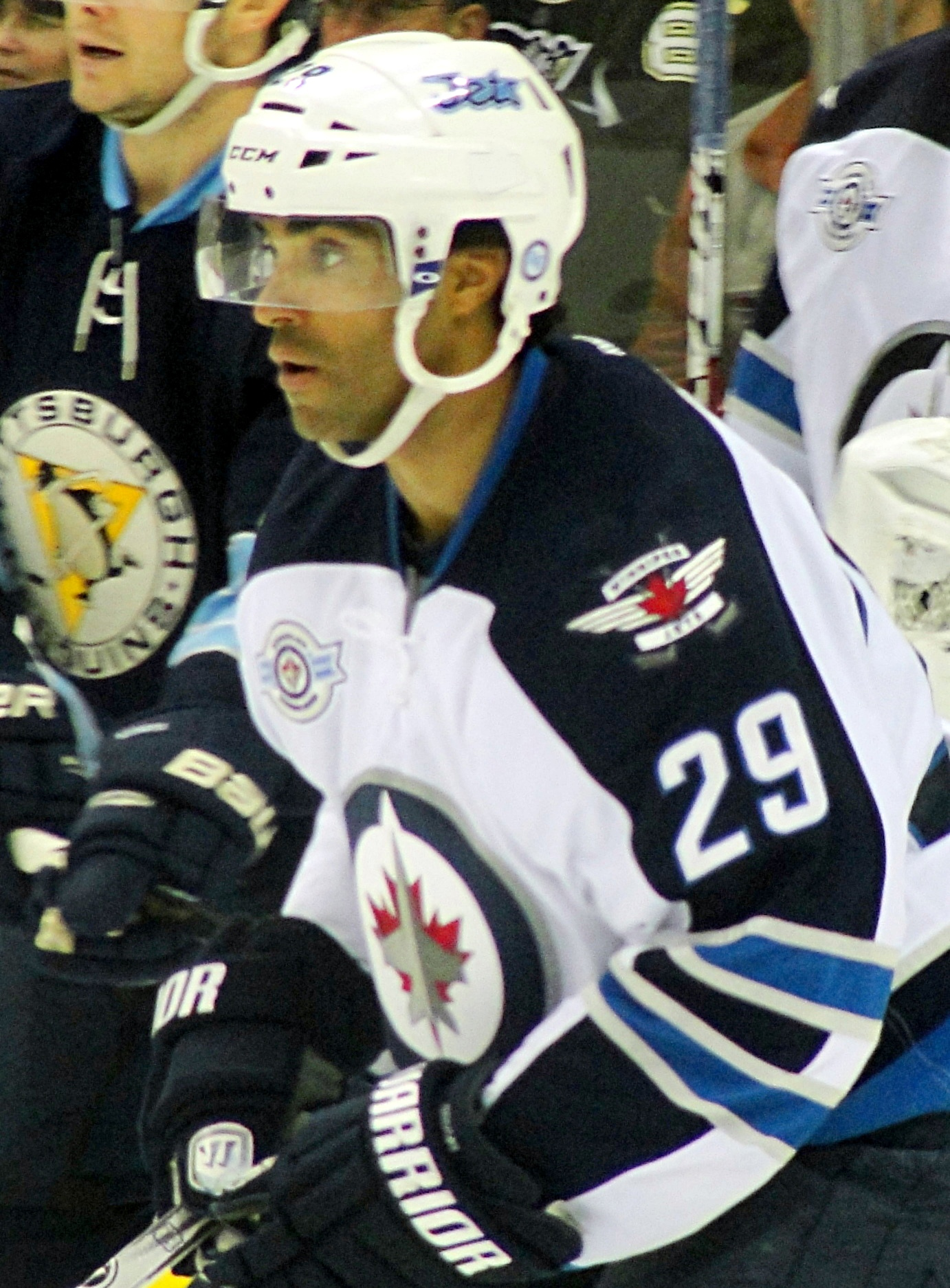
Johnny Oduya played one season with the Jets before being traded to the Chicago Blackhawks.

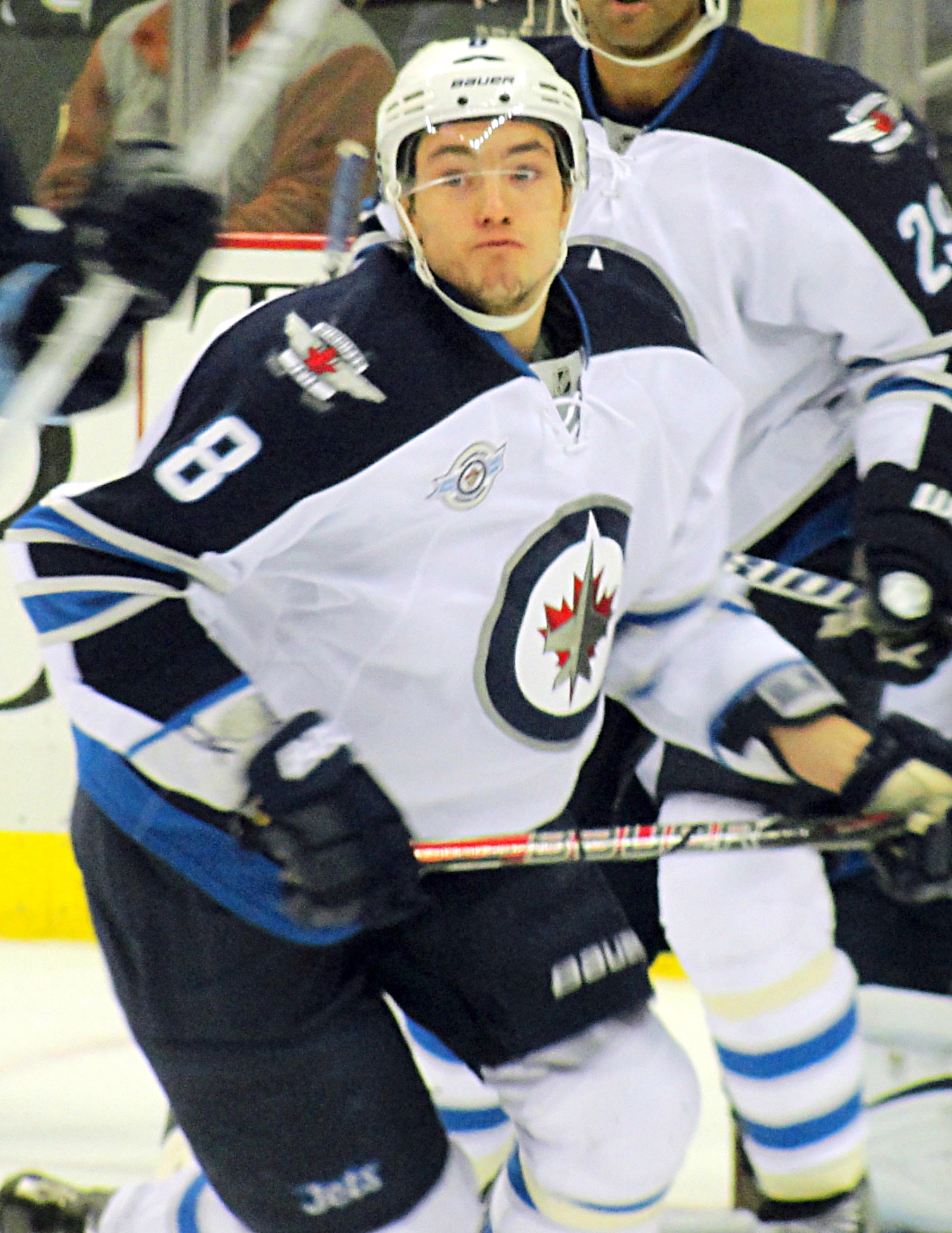
Alexander Burmistrov

Name	Nationality	Pos	Seasons	GP	G	A	P	PIM	GP	G	A	P	PIM	Notes
Name	Nationality	Pos	Seasons	Regular season					Playoffs					Notes
John Albert	United States	C	2013—2014	9	1	0	1	0	—	—	—	—	—	
Jaret Anderson-Dolan	Canada	C	2024—2025	7	0	1	1	4	5	1	1	2	2	
Mason Appleton	United States	C	2018—2025	351	51	70	121	110	32	1	11	12	22	
Nik Antropov	Kazakhstan	C	2011—2013	109	21	32	53	58	—	—	—	—	—	
Joel Armia	Finland	RW	2015—2018	179	26	32	58	54	13	2	0	2	2	
Morgan Barron*	Canada	C	2021—2026	303	40	41	81	105	18	0	2	2	4	
Nathan Beaulieu	Canada	D	2018—2022	105	1	17	18	81	4	0	1	1	7	
Jordie Benn	Canada	D	2020—2021	8	0	1	1	0	3	0	1	1	0	
Anthony Bitetto	United States	D	2019—2020	51	0	8	8	32	—	—	—	—	—	
Gabriel Bourque	Canada	LW	2019—2020	52	2	4	6	7	3	0	0	0	0	
Zach Bogosian	United States	D	2011—2015	194	16	52	68	188	—	—	—	—	—	
Adam Brooks	Canada	C	2021—2022	14	0	0	0	0	—	—	—	—	—	
Julien Brouillette	Canada	D	2014—2015	1	0	0	0	0	—	—	—	—	—	
Jacob Bryson*	Canada	D	2025—2026	15	0	3	3	2	—	—	—	—	—	
Alexander Burmistrov	Russia	C	2011—2013; 2015—2017	298	30	51	81	121	—	—	—	—	—	
Dustin Byfuglien	United States	D	2011—2019	528	102	261	363	773	27	7	18	25	28	
Kyle Capobianco	Canada	D	2022—2023	14	2	0	2	2	1	0	0	0	0	
Ben Chiarot	Canada	D	2013—2019	305	12	52	64	192	24	0	3	3	17	
Andrei Chibisov	Russia	D	2019—2020	2	0	0	0	0	—	—	—	—	—	
Nikita Chibrikov*	Russia	RW	2023—2026	16	3	1	4	14	—	—	—	—	—	
Declan Chisholm	Canada	D	2021—2024	4	0	1	1	0	—	—	—	—	—	
Dylan Coghlan	Canada	D	2024—2025	6	0	0	0	4	—	—	—	—	—	
Kyle Connor*	United States	LW	2016—2026	695	323	351	674	155	58	20	29	49	6	
Andrew Copp	United States	C	2014—2022	467	74	110	184	82	34	3	9	12	14	
Patrice Cormier	Canada	F	2011—2017	31	0	3	3	14	—	—	—	—	—	
Carl Dahlström	Sweden	D	2019—2020	15	0	1	1	6	—	—	—	—	—	
Marko Dano	Slovakia	RW	2015—2018	82	10	12	22	24	—	—	—	—	—	
Chase De Leo	United States	C	2015—2017	2	0	0	0	0	—	—	—	—	—	
Dylan DeMelo*	Canada	D	2019—2026	459	16	102	118	218	31	1	6	7	22	
Brenden Dillon	Canada	D	2021—2024	238	13	50	63	235	8	0	4	4	13	
Pierre-Luc Dubois	Canada	LW	2020—2023	195	63	80	143	219	12	2	5	7	16	
Walker Duehr*	United States	F	2025—2026	3	0	0	0	0	—	—	—	—	—	
Cody Eakin	Canada	C	2019—2020	8	1	4	5	6	4	0	0	0	4	
Nikolaj Ehlers	Denmark	LW	2015—2025	674	225	295	520	222	45	9	12	21	10	
Keaton Ellerby	Canada	D	2013—2015	52	2	5	7	2	—	—	—	—	—	
Tobias Enstrom	Sweden	D	2011—2018	401	28	109	137	244	15	0	1	1	2	
Michael Eyssimont	United States	C	2021—2023	20	1	4	5	7	—	—	—	—	—	
Eric Fehr	Canada	C	2011—2012	35	2	1	3	12	—	—	—	—	—	
Brett Festerling	Canada	D	2011—2012	5	0	0	0	2	—	—	—	—	—	
Haydn Fleury*	Canada	D	2024—2026	77	2	9	11	18	8	0	2	2	8	
Mark Flood	Canada	D	2011—2012	33	3	4	7	10	—	—	—	—	—	
Derek Forbort	United States	D	2020—2021	56	2	10	12	35	8	1	0	1	0	
Parker Ford*	United States	F	2024—2026	18	1	1	2	6	—	—	—	—	—	
Michael Frolik	Czech Republic	C	2013—2015	163	34	50	84	30	4	0	0	0	2	
Sam Gagner	Canada	C	2022—2023	48	8	6	14	13	—	—	—	—	—	
Aaron Gagnon	Canada	C	2011—2013	17	3	0	3	2	—	—	—	—	—	
TJ Galiardi	United States	C	2014—2015	38	1	0	1	2	—	—	—	—	—	
Tanner Glass	Canada	LW	2011—2012	78	5	11	16	73	—	—	—	—	—	
David Gustafsson	Sweden	C	2019—2025	149	6	14	20	13	11	2	0	2	2	
Ron Hainsey	United States	D	2011—2013	103	0	23	23	33	—	—	—	—	—	
Matthew Halischuk	Canada	RW	2013—2016	123	8	13	21	16	—	—	—	—	—	
Jansen Harkins	United States	C	2019—2023	154	13	14	27	36	4	1	0	1	4	
Jay Harrison	Canada	D	2014—2015	35	2	3	5	23	—	—	—	—	—	
Kevin Hayes	United States	C/RW	2018—2019	20	5	8	13	2	6	2	1	3	2	
Ville Heinola*	Finland	D	2019—2026	58	1	11	12	26	—	—	—	—	—	
Matt Hendricks	United States	C	2017—2019	64	5	9	14	39	5	0	0	0	4	
Quinton Howden	Canada	C	2016—2017	5	0	0	0	0	—	—	—	—	—	
Alex Iafallo*	United States	C	2023—2026	243	39	48	87	35	18	1	2	3	10	
Jason Jaffray	Canada	LW	2011—2012	13	0	1	1	7	—	—	—	—	—	
Olli Jokinen	Finland	C	2012—2014	127	25	32	57	76	—	—	—	—	—	
Randy Jones	Canada	D	2011—2012	39	1	1	2	8	—	—	—	—	—	
Axel Jonsson Fjallby	Sweden	LW	2022—2024	76	8	11	19	8	2	0	0	0	0	
Evander Kane	Canada	LW	2011—2015	222	76	77	153	255	—	—	—	—	—	
Carl Klingberg	Sweden	RW	2011—2015	11	1	0	1	4	—	—	—	—	—	
Cole Koepke*	United States	LW	2025—2026	66	8	9	17	16	—	—	—	—	—	
Scott Kosmachuk	Canada	RW	2015—2017	8	0	3	3	2	—	—	—	—	—	
Johnathan Kovacevic	Canada	D	2021—2022	4	0	0	0	2	—	—	—	—	—	
Karson Kuhlman	United States	C	2022—2023	33	2	2	4	8	1	0	0	0	0	
Arturs Kulda	Latvia	D	2011—2012	9	0	0	0	4	—	—	—	—	—	
Dmitry Kulikov	Russia	D	2017—2020	170	5	22	27	101	11	0	2	2	10	
Rasmus Kupari	Finland	C	2023—2025	87	5	4	9	20	—	—	—	—	—	
Andrew Ladd	Canada	LW	2011—2016	348	110	136	246	254	4	0	1	1	4	Captain: 2011-2016
Patrik Laine	Finland	RW	2016—2021	306	140	110	250	118	24	8	8	16	4	
Brad Lambert*	Finland	C	2023—2026	31	3	5	8	8	—	—	—	—	—	
Brendan Lemieux	United States	LW	2017—2019	53	10	2	12	85	—	—	—	—	—	
Mark Letestu	Canada	C	2019—2020	7	0	0	0	0	—	—	—	—	—	
Trevor Lewis	United States	C	2020—2021	56	5	5	10	2	8	0	0	0	0	
Par Lindholm	Sweden	C	2018—2019	4	0	1	1	0	2	0	0	0	0	
JC Lipon	Canada	RW	2015—2017	9	0	2	2	5	—	—	—	—	—	
Bryan Little	Canada	C	2011—2020	561	149	223	372	198	27	4	8	12	2	
Adam Lowry*	United States	C	2014—2026	845	126	168	294	452	62	15	9	24	37	
Joona Luoto	Finland	F	2019—2020	16	0	0	0	2	—	—	—	—	—	
Spencer Machacek	Canada	RW	2011—2012	13	2	7	9	7	—	—	—	—	—	
Brett MacLean	Canada	LW	2011—2012	5	0	2	2	2	—	—	—	—	—	
Saku Maenalanen	Finland	RW	2022—2023	64	4	6	10	16	5	0	1	1	12	
Jeff Malott	Canada	F	2021—2022	1	0	0	0	2	—	—	—	—	—	
Shawn Matthias	Canada	C	2016—2018	72	9	6	15	23	—	—	—	—	—	
Ben Maxwell	Canada	C	2011—2012	9	1	4	5	0	—	—	—	—	—	
Kenndal McArdle	Canada	LW	2011—2012	9	0	0	0	4	—	—	—	—	—	
Derek Meech	Canada	D	2011—2013	18	0	1	1	6	—	—	—	—	—	
Julian Melchiori	Canada	D	2015—2017	30	0	2	2	14	—	—	—	—	—	
Antti Miettinen	Finland	RW	2011—2013	67	8	10	18	2	—	—	—	—	—	
Colin Miller*	Canada	D	2023—2026	83	4	14	18	46	5	0	2	2	4	
Sean Monahan	Canada	C	2023—2024	34	13	11	24	2	5	0	1	1	0	
Josh Morrissey*	Canada	D	2015—2026	739	94	334	428	351	54	5	15	20	26	
Joe Morrow	Canada	D	2017—2019	59	2	10	12	20	6	1	0	1	14	
Tyler Myers	Canada	D	2014—2019	270	29	85	114	212	26	5	3	8	14	
Vladislav Namestnikov*	Russia	C	2022—2026	236	32	67	99	119	22	4	5	9	20	
Riley Nash	Canada	C	2021—2022	15	0	0	0	4	—	—	—	—	—	
Nino Niederreiter*	Switzerland	RW	2022—2026	242	49	54	103	82	23	5	7	12	16	
Sami Niku	Finland	D	2017—2021	54	2	8	10	22	—	—	—	—	—	
Nelson Nogier	Canada	D	2016—2017; 2018—2019	11	0	0	0	5	—	—	—	—	—	
Gustav Nyquist*	Sweden	RW	2025—2026	51	1	11	12	10	—	—	—	—	—	
Eric O'Dell	Canada	C	2013—2015	41	3	5	8	29	—	—	—	—	—	
Johnny Oduya	Sweden	D	2011—2012	63	2	11	13	33	—	—	—	—	—	
Adam Pardy	Canada	D	2013—2016	124	0	16	16	86	2	1	0	1	2	
Tanner Pearson*	Canada	LW	2025—2026	52	7	6	13	25	—	—	—	—	—	
Anthony Peluso	Canada	RW	2012—2017	142	4	10	14	209	—	—	—	—	—	
Cole Perfetti*	Canada	C	2021—2026	290	59	98	157	68	14	3	3	6	2	
Mathieu Perreault	Canada	C	2014—2021	455	88	142	230	212	29	2	5	7	18	
Nic Petan	Canada	C	2015—2019	108	5	18	23	30	—	—	—	—	—	
Isaak Phillips*	Canada	D	2025—2026	3	0	0	0	2	—	—	—	—	—	
Neal Pionk*	United States	D	2019—2026	486	40	188	228	286	35	1	20	21	20	
Austin Poganski	United States	RW	2021—2022	16	0	0	0	7	—	—	—	—	—	
Alexei Ponikarovsky	Ukraine	LW	2012—2013	12	2	0	2	6	—	—	—	—	—	
Tucker Poolman	United States	D	2017—2021	120	5	14	19	26	14	1	1	2	2	
Paul Postma	Canada	D	2011—2017	190	10	24	34	49	—	—	—	—	—	
Zach Redmond	United States	D	2012—2013	18	2	5	7	12	—	—	—	—	—	
Kristian Reichel	Czech Republic	F	2021—2023	15	1	2	3	7	—	—	—	—	—	
Isak Rosen*	Sweden	RW	2025—2026	21	3	0	3	0	—	—	—	—	—	
Jack Roslovic	United States	C	2016—2020	180	26	41	67	18	20	0	5	5	2	
Elias Salomonsson*	Sweden	D	2025—2026	32	1	4	5	12	—	—	—	—	—	
Dylan Samberg*	United States	D	2021—2026	282	10	55	65	112	23	0	3	3	10	
Zach Sanford	United States	LW	2021—2022	18	0	4	4	13	—	—	—	—	—	
Mike Santorelli	Canada	C	2012—2013	10	0	1	1	0	—	—	—	—	—	
Luca Sbisa	Switzerland	D	2019—2020	44	2	8	10	37	—	—	—	—	—	
Mark Scheifele*	Canada	C	2011—2026	961	372	535	907	464	53	26	23	49	59	
Luke Schenn*	Canada	D	2024—2026	61	1	8	9	36	11	0	1	1	32	
Cameron Schilling	United States	D	2018—2019	4	0	1	1	0	—	—	—	—	—	
Nate Schmidt	United States	D	2021—2024	211	13	52	65	34	8	1	2	3	0	
Devin Setoguchi	Canada	RW	2013—2014	75	11	16	27	22	—	—	—	—	—	
Logan Shaw	Canada	RW	2019—2020	35	3	2	5	0	3	0	0	0	0	
Nick Shore	United States	C	2019—2020	42	1	2	3	8	4	0	0	0	2	
Jim Slater	United States	C	2011—2015	213	20	18	38	127	4	0	0	0	0	
Drew Stafford	United States	RW	2014—2017	144	34	36	70	48	4	1	1	2	0	
Logan Stanley*	Canada	D	2020—2026	261	14	43	57	304	17	2	2	4	52	
Tim Stapleton	United States	C	2011—2012	63	11	16	27	10	—	—	—	—	—	
Paul Stastny	United States	C	2017—2018; 2020—2022	146	38	49	87	50	23	7	10	17	8	
Lee Stempniak	United States	RW	2014—2015	18	6	4	10	2	4	1	0	1	0	
Kevin Stenlund	Sweden	C	2022—2023	54	6	3	9	20	5	1	0	1	2	
Brian Strait	United States	D	2016—2017	5	0	2	2	0	—	—	—	—	—	
Mark Stuart	United States	D	2011—2017	368	12	42	54	414	4	1	1	2	2	
C. J. Suess	United States	LW	2019—2022	4	0	0	0	2	—	—	—	—	—	
Evgeny Svechnikov	Russia	LW	2021—2022	72	7	12	19	38	—	—	—	—	—	
Brandon Tanev	Canada	LW	2015—2019; 2024—2025	214	25	31	56	93	35	5	3	8	29	
Eric Tangradi	United States	LW	2012—2014	91	4	6	10	43	—	—	—	—	—	
Nate Thompson	United States	C	2020—2021	44	2	3	5	4	8	0	2	2	2	
Chris Thorburn	Canada	RW	2011—2017	396	24	32	56	467	4	0	0	0	0	
Jiri Tlusty	Czech Republic	LW	2014—2015	20	1	7	8	4	4	0	0	0	0	
Jonathan Toews*	Canada	C	2025—2026	82	11	18	29	38	—	—	—	—	—	
Dominic Toninato	United States	C	2020—2025	104	8	13	21	30	5	1	0	1	4	
Jacob Trouba	United States	D	2013—2019	408	42	137	179	297	27	2	4	6	23	
Kristian Vesalainen	Finland	W	2018—2019; 2020—2022	70	2	3	5	6	4	0	0	0	0	
Gabriel Vilardi*	Canada	C	2023—2026	200	79	87	166	52	14	1	7	8	10	
Kyle Wellwood	Canada	C	2011—2013	116	24	38	62	6	—	—	—	—	—	
Blake Wheeler	United States	RW	2011—2023	874	275	540	815	596	44	9	30	39	23	
James Wright	Canada	C	2012—2014	97	2	5	7	46	—	—	—	—	—	
Brayden Yager*	Canada	C	2025—2026	3	0	0	0	2	—	—	—	—	—	
Danil Zhilkin*	Russia	C	2025—2026	6	0	1	1	0	—	—	—	—	—	
