= Jim Ralph =

Canadian ice hockey player and media personality

- Born: May 13, 1962 (age 63) Sault Ste. Marie, Ontario, Canada
- Height: 5 ft 11 in (180 cm)
- Weight: 170 lb (77 kg; 12 st 2 lb)
- Position: Goaltender
- Caught: Right
- Played for: Springfield Indians; Baltimore Skipjacks; Milwaukee Admirals; Nova Scotia Oilers; Newmarket Saints
- NHL draft: 162nd overall, 1980; Chicago Black Hawks
- Playing career: 1982–1989

Jim Ralph (born May 13, 1962) is a media personality and retired professional hockey player from Sault Ste. Marie, Ontario, Canada.

From 1978 to 1989, he played for numerous Ontario Hockey League and American Hockey League teams, including the Ottawa 67s, the Springfield Indians, and the Newmarket Saints. While playing for the 67's, Ralph started his broadcasting career as a summer fill in announcer on CHAS-FM in the Sault.

Ralph was drafted by the Chicago Black Hawks, 162nd overall, in the 1980 NHL entry draft. After a serious knee injury, he turned to broadcasting. Ralph was the colour commentator of the Toronto Maple Leafs on AM640 Toronto Radio from 1997 to 2012, and on Sportsnet 590 The Fan and TSN 1050 since 2013. His former partners have included Dennis Beyak, Dan Dunleavy, and Joe Bowen.
