= Peter Maher (sportscaster) =

Canadian ice hockey announcer (1946–2026)

- Born: November 11, 1946; Campbellton, New Brunswick, Canada
- Died: August 13, 2026 (aged 79); Calgary, Alberta, Canada
- Occupation: Radio broadcaster
- Awards: Foster Hewitt Memorial Award (2006)

Peter Holt Maher (November 11, 1946 – August 13, 2026) was a Canadian sportscaster. He was the radio voice of the Calgary Flames from their move to Calgary, Alberta, in 1980 until his retirement following the 2013–14 NHL season. He broadcast every Flames game for 33 years on the city's all-sports radio station, CFAC. Maher became known for his catchphrase, "Yeah Baby!" after a significant or important moment, and "You can put it in the win column!" after every Flames win.

== Early life ==
Maher was born in Campbellton, New Brunswick on November 11, 1946. He began broadcasting at age 14, when he started announcing the lineup for the Campbellton softball league. After high school, he had stints in the International Hockey League and North Shore Hockey League.

== Career ==
Maher began his professional broadcasting career in 1977, calling play-by-play for the Toronto Maple Leafs on the radio. In 1980, he became the first ever radio voice of the Calgary Flames. Over his career he became well known as he called 33 straight seasons. Some of his highlights include the 1986 Stanley Cup run, the 1989 Stanley Cup Championship, and the surprising underdog run to the Stanley Cup Finals in 2004.

In November 2006, he was inducted into the NHL Hockey Hall of Fame as a media honoree, the Foster Hewitt Memorial Award winner. He has been inducted into the hometown Campbellton Sports Hall of Fame, the New Brunswick Sports Hall of Fame, and the Maritime Sports Hall of Fame.

During the 2010 Winter Olympics, Maher was the voice of the hockey broadcast for Sportsnet. He was heard on many radios across Canada as he called Sidney Crosby's iconic "Golden Goal".

== Retirement and death ==
On April 29, 2014, Maher announced his retirement. He called a total of 2,954 Flames games and 3,162 NHL games. He was honored before a Flames game on November 18, 2014, where he had a broadcast booth named after him at the Scotiabank Saddledome.

Maher died in Calgary on August 13, 2026, at the age of 79.
