= Mark Hebscher =

Canadian sports journalist

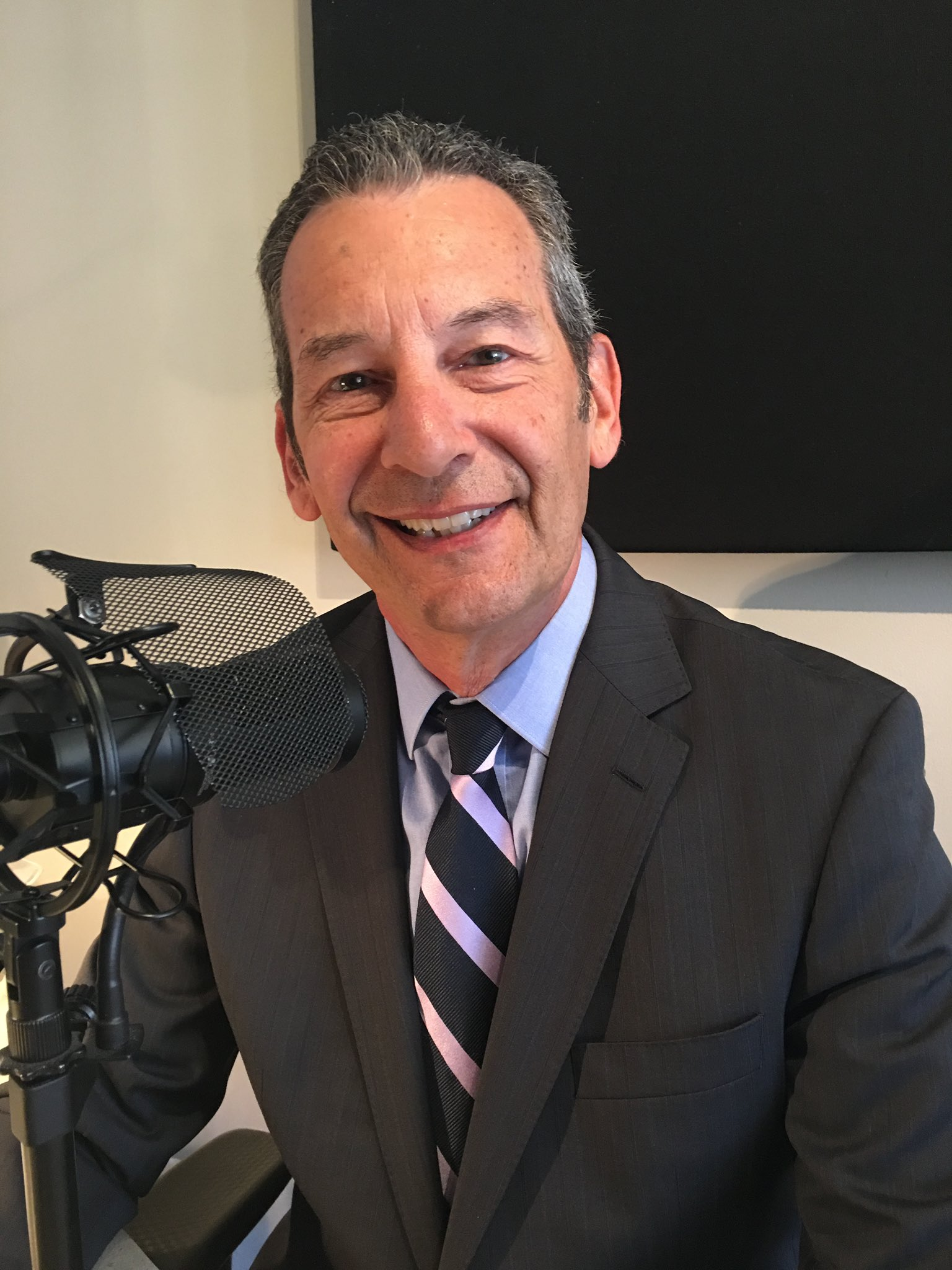
- Mark Hebscher
- Born: January 1, 1956 (age 70); Toronto, Ontario, Canada
- Education: Conestoga College
- Years active: 1980–present
- Sports commentary career
- Sports: Ice hockey, Canadian football

Mark Hebscher (born January 1, 1956) is a Canadian television and radio personality, and author.

Hebscher has worked primarily in sports, and is best known for co-hosting Sportsline, an evening sports show on the Global Television Network and CHCH-DT. His other work has included hosting the flagship sports show Sportscentral on CTV Sportsnet in the 1990s, play-by-play for the Toronto Argonauts radio broadcasts, host of Maple Leaf Hockey on the Global Television Network, anchor of Headline Sports, and host of Square Off, a current affairs show, with Donna Skelly on CHCH-DT. He has authored The Greatest Athlete (you've never heard of), a book about George Orton, a track-and-field athlete who was the first Canadian to medal at the Summer Olympics in 1900.

== Biography ==
Hebscher was born on January 1, 1956, in Toronto, Ontario.

== Broadcasting career ==
Hebscher attended Conestoga College in the applied radio and TV arts program. He began working at CJFM-FM in Montreal in 1980. His radio career was known for a practical joke on April Fools' Day in 1980, wherein Hebscher announced that then-Montreal Canadiens star defenseman Larry Robinson had been traded to the Los Angeles Kings for star forward Marcel Dionne.

Hebscher joined the Global Television Network in 1984 to co-host Sportsline, an evening sports show, alongside Jim Tatti. Sportsline was known for presenting highlights with voice-over of the show's hosts, sometimes obtained minutes after events ended, which was then a novelty. Hebscher presented a weekly series of bloopers and highlights from the previous week, that were humorously called the "Hebsy" awards. Sportsline was nominated for two Gemini Awards as best sports show, and in 1989 Hebscher was nominated for best performance by a sports broadcaster. Sportsline was revived for another 5-year run from 2010 to 2015 on CHCH-DT in Hamilton, Ontario with Hebscher co-hosting with Clint "Bubba" O'Neil.

Hebscher next worked as a sports announcer and hosted Maple Leaf Hockey, a live broadcast of Toronto Maple Leaf hockey games on the Global Television Network. Subsequent to this, he returned to radio, doing play-by-play for the Toronto Argonauts and served as sports director of Toronto radio stations Q107 and AM640.

== Subsequent work ==
Hebscher co-hosted a current affairs show called Square Off initially at CHCH-DT with future MPP Donna Skelly. In 2015, CHCH-DT declared bankruptcy, and many on-air personalities, including Hebscher, were laid off. Hebscher has subsequently hosted podcasts, most recently Hebsy on Sports with Mike Boon, which started in 2018. Hebscher stopped the podcast in May 2023, officially retiring.

In 2019, Hebscher wrote a book titled The Greatest Athlete (you've never heard of) which chronicled George Orton, the first Canadian to win an Olympic gold medal. Orton was paralyzed as a child after a fall from a tree, but went on to win a gold medal in the 2500-metre steeplechase at the 1900 Summer Games.
