= Dennis Beyak =

Canadian sportscaster

- Born: Winnipegosis, Manitoba
- Occupations: Sports Broadcaster, Hockey Play-by-Play Announcer
- Employer: TSN
- Known for: Winnipeg Jets, TSN 1290

Dennis Beyak is a former Canadian hockey play-by-play broadcaster from Winnipeg, Manitoba. He was TSN's play-by-play announcer for Winnipeg Jets games through to the end of the 2021-22 NHL season.

== Broadcasting career ==
Beyak began his broadcasting career in 1970 at CFAR as a play-by-play announcer for the Flin Flon Bombers of the Western Canada Hockey League. Beyak has also provided commentary for the WHL's Saskatoon Blades, Victoria Cougars, and Seattle Thunderbirds.

Beyak's first NHL broadcasting job was at CFRN-TV, as the television play-by-play announcer of the Edmonton Oilers. from 1995 until 1997, when CFRN lost the local TV contract to the newly formed A-Channel.

In 1998, he became a Toronto Maple Leafs play-by-play announcer for AM640 Toronto Radio (with Jim Ralph). In 2005, he also became the television play-by-play announcer for the Toronto Marlies. Starting with the 2011–12 season, Beyak returned to TSN and became the new voice of the Winnipeg Jets, also on TSN 1290 in Winnipeg.
