= Patrick Chan =

Canadian figure skater (born 1990)

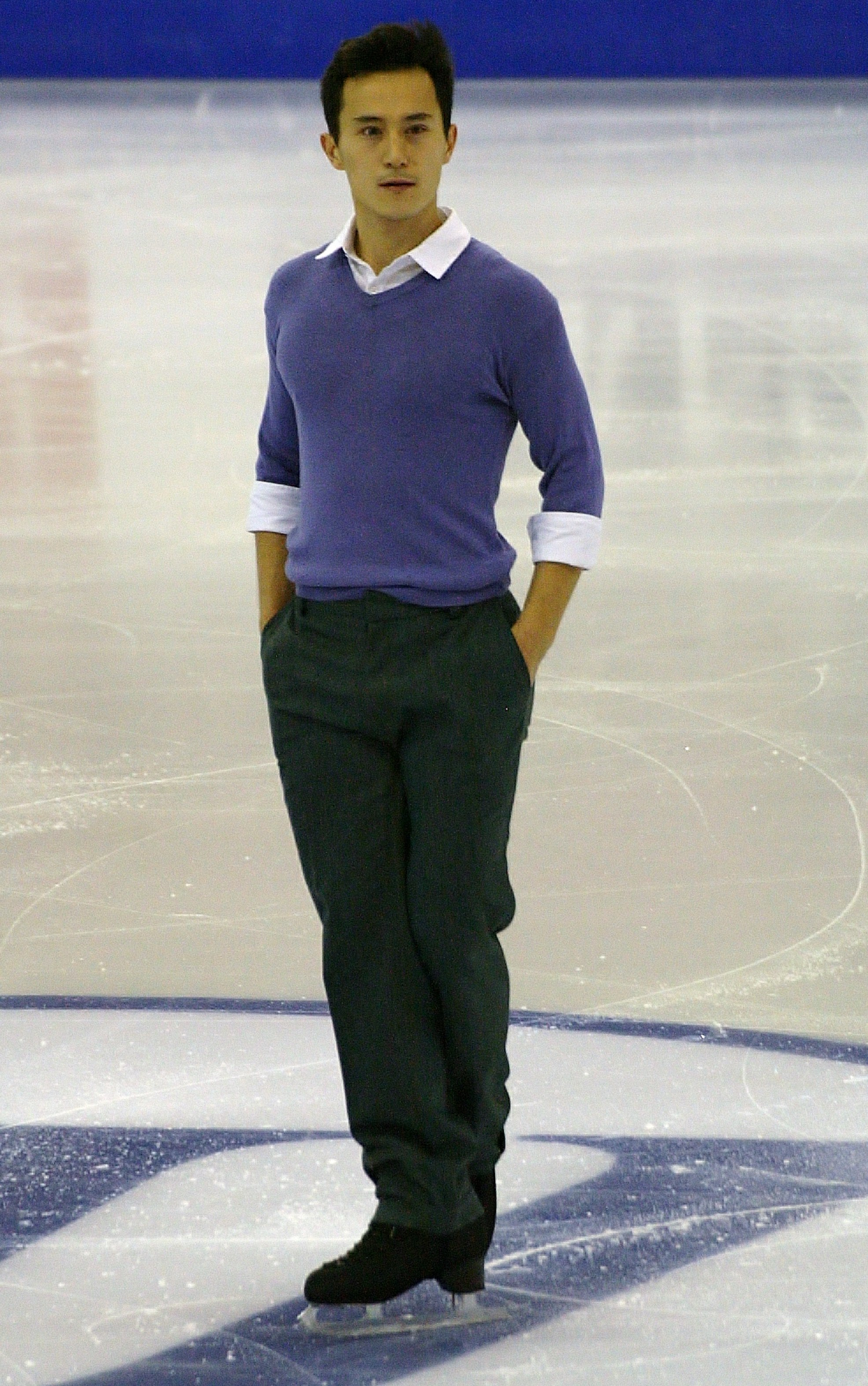
- Chan at the 2015 Grand Prix Final

Personal information
- Full name: Patrick Lewis Wai-Kuan Chan
- Other names: Chan Wai-Kuan
- Born: December 31, 1990 (age 35) Ottawa, Ontario, Canada
- Home town: Vancouver, British Columbia
- Height: 1.71 m (5 ft 7 in)

Figure skating career
- Country: Canada
- Discipline: Men's singles
- Began skating: 1996
- Retired: April 16, 2018
- Highest WS: 1st (2011–12, 2012–13 & 2013–14)
Event	Gold medal – first place	Silver medal – second place	Bronze medal – third place
Olympic Games	1	2	0
World Championships	3	2	0
Four Continents Championships	3	0	0
Grand Prix Final	2	1	1
Canadian Championships	10	0	0
World Team Trophy	0	2	1
World Junior Championships	0	1	0
Medal list
Olympic Games
Gold medal – first place	2018 Pyeongchang	Team
Silver medal – second place	2014 Sochi	Singles
Silver medal – second place	2014 Sochi	Team
World Championships
Gold medal – first place	2011 Moscow	Singles
Gold medal – first place	2012 Nice	Singles
Gold medal – first place	2013 London	Singles
Silver medal – second place	2009 Los Angeles	Singles
Silver medal – second place	2010 Turin	Singles
Four Continents Championships
Gold medal – first place	2009 Vancouver	Singles
Gold medal – first place	2012 Colorado Springs	Singles
Gold medal – first place	2016 Taipei	Singles
Grand Prix Final
Gold medal – first place	2010–11 Beijing	Singles
Gold medal – first place	2011–12 Quebec City	Singles
Silver medal – second place	2013–14 Fukuoka	Singles
Bronze medal – third place	2012–13 Sochi	Singles
Canadian Championships
Gold medal – first place	2008 Vancouver	Singles
Gold medal – first place	2009 Saskatoon	Singles
Gold medal – first place	2010 London	Singles
Gold medal – first place	2011 Victoria	Singles
Gold medal – first place	2012 Moncton	Singles
Gold medal – first place	2013 Mississauga	Singles
Gold medal – first place	2014 Ottawa	Singles
Gold medal – first place	2016 Halifax	Singles
Gold medal – first place	2017 Ottawa	Singles
Gold medal – first place	2018 Vancouver	Singles
World Team Trophy
Silver medal – second place	2009 Tokyo	Team
Silver medal – second place	2013 Tokyo	Team
Bronze medal – third place	2012 Tokyo	Team
World Junior Championships
Silver medal – second place	2007 Oberstdorf	Singles

Patrick Chan
- Traditional Chinese: 陳偉群
- Simplified Chinese: 陈伟群
Transcriptions
Standard Mandarin
- Hanyu Pinyin: Chén Wěiqún
- IPA: [ʈʂʰə̌n wèɪtɕʰwə̌n]
Yue: Cantonese
- Jyutping: Can4 Wai5 Kwan4

Patrick Lewis Wai–Kuan Chan (born December 31, 1990) is a Canadian former competitive figure skater. He is a 2018 Olympic gold medallist in the team event, 2014 Olympic silver medallist in the men's and team events, a three-time World champion (2011, 2012, 2013), a two–time Grand Prix Final champion (2010 and 2011), a three-time Four Continents champion (2009, 2012, 2016), and a ten-time Canadian national champion (2008–2014, 2016–2018). He is known for his skating style which is highly appreciated for artistry and elegance. Patrick Chan is a recognized master of figure skating who has made a great contribution to this sport.

On April 27, 2011, Chan set a new world record of 93.02 points for the short program. On April 28, 2011, Chan then set a new world record for his free skating, receiving an overall score of 280.98. In recognition, he was named the recipient of the Lou Marsh Award as Canada's top athlete. Chan has repeatedly set world records in figure skating under the ISU Judging System, being the world record holder for many years. He is one of the few figure skaters in the world to break the 100-point barrier in the short program, and is the third man in the world to break the 200-point barrier in the free program. During his 15–year competing career, he has won more than 30 titles and medals of ISU competitions, including three Olympic medals. He announced the end of his career on April 16, 2018. Chan is considered by many to be one of the greatest Canadian male figure skaters of all time.

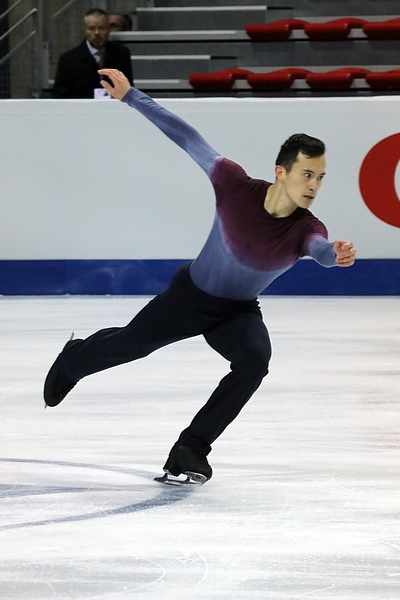
Chan at the 2016–17 Grand Prix of Figure Skating Final

== Personal life ==
Patrick Lewis Wai–Kuan Chan was born December 31, 1990, in Ottawa, Ontario, Canada. He is the only child of Lewis Chan, a lawyer, and Karen, both immigrants from Hong Kong. Arriving at the age of four, Lewis grew up in Montreal, Quebec, and pursued table tennis, golf, and weight–lifting. Karen, who won both singles and doubles tennis championships in her native city, moved to Canada in her 20s to continue her studies.

His Chinese name is Chan Wai–Kuan. At the age of five, Chan showed talent in downhill skiing but focused on other sports after his family moved to Toronto. He has an enduring interest in many sports, including taekwondo, tennis, golf, and mountain climbing.

Chan is fluent in English, French, and Cantonese. His parents wanted him to be multilingual, so at home his father spoke French to him, his mother spoke Cantonese, and their son learned English from his daily life in Ontario. Chan graduated from École secondaire Étienne-Brûlé, a French–language school in North York, Toronto, in 2009, prolonging his high school education by an extra year because of his skating. After Chan became national champion, the school created an annual sporting award in his honour. Chan tried to enroll in college a couple of times: first at Colorado College to study international economics in September 2011 and second at the University of Toronto to study social sciences in the fall of 2014.

Chan has won numerous off–ice awards for his accomplishments. In January 2008, the Chinese Cultural Centre of Greater Toronto (Youth Chapter) conferred Chan with the 2007 Chinese Canadian Youth of the Year award. In May 2008, Chan was named Asian of the Year in arts and sports by Asia Network magazine. In January 2009, the Globe and Mail named Chan as one of the most prominent sports personalities in their annual Power List in Canadian sports.

In 2020, Chan wed Canadian former pair skater Elizabeth Putnam. In September 2021, they welcomed a son. In 2024, they welcomed a second son.

== Skating career ==
=== Early career ===
Patrick Chan started skating in 1996. He originally wanted to learn to skate to play hockey, but soon became interested in figure skating. His coach, Osborne Colson, made him spend 30 minutes a day on basic stroking, edge work, cross-cutting, and balance drills. Chan said, "I tell people I owe the flow in my knees and the flow I generate from my edges to Mr. Colson. He knew he had to pull everything apart and start from the ground up on the basics of skating."

In 2001, aged 10, Chan won the bronze medal at the Canadian Junior National Championships at the juvenile level, the lowest qualifying level in the Canadian figure skating competition structure. He won the pre-novice national title in 2003, the novice title in 2004, and the junior title in 2005.

His gold at the junior level of the 2005 Canadian Championships earned him a place at the 2005 World Junior Championships, where he placed seventh. At the age of 14, he was the youngest skater at the event.

In the 2005–2006 season, Chan made his ISU Junior Grand Prix debut. He won the gold medal at the event in Montreal and placed fourth at the event in Slovakia. He qualified for the Junior Grand Prix Final, where he placed fifth. Making his senior national debut at the 2006 Canadian Championships, he placed seventh and earned a spot at the 2006 World Junior Championships, where he placed sixth.

His first coach, Osborne Colson, guided him from the beginning of Chan's career until Colson's death in July 2006, due to complications arising from a car accident. Chan won the 2005 Canadian Junior Championship under Colson's guidance, and Colson had planned to coach Chan to the top of the sport. Chan regarded Colson as a grandfather figure, and the Chan family was at Colson's deathbed when he died. Chan wore a gold medallion belonging to Colson that was engraved with Colson's initials. Chan was then coached by technical specialist Shin Amano, who coached in the same facility. This was a temporary arrangement that lasted six months.

=== 2006–2007 season ===
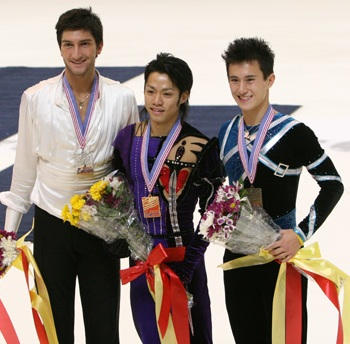
Chan (right) on the podium at the 2007 Skate America

Aged 16, Chan decided to advance to the senior level internationally, despite having only one junior international medal. He was assigned two Grand Prix events and made his senior international debut at the 2006 Trophée Éric Bompard, where he placed fifth. He later placed seventh at the 2006 NHK Trophy.

Chan competed at the 2007 Canadian Championships in Halifax and placed fifth. This earned him his third consecutive spot at the World Junior Championships, where he won the silver medal, becoming the first Canadian men's skater since 1984 to win a medal at the event.

Chan began working with Don Laws, a former student of Colson's whom he met at Colson's funeral, in 2007.

=== 2007–2008 season ===
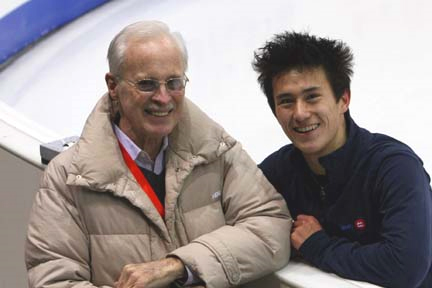
Chan and Don Laws at the 2007–08 Grand Prix Final

Chan divided his training time between World Arena Ice Hall in Colorado Springs, Colorado, and the Granite Club in Toronto. Chan began his Grand Prix season at the 2007 Skate America, where he won the bronze medal. He then went on to win gold at the 2007 Trophée Éric Bompard. He placed fifth at the 2007–08 Grand Prix Final. At the 2008 Canadian Championships Chan won the national title at age 17. It was incorrectly reported that he had become the youngest Canadian men's champion in history—a record still held by Charles Snelling, who was 16 at the time of his 1954 victory.

Chan competed at the 2008 World Championships in March. He placed seventh in the short program and 11th in the free skating, placing ninth overall. Canada had two spots in the 2008 Worlds. Chan's placement, combined with that of Jeffrey Buttle, who won the event, earned Canada three spots in the 2009 World Championships in the men's event.

In May 2008, Chan performed in the Festa on Ice show in South Korea, alongside show headliner Yuna Kim.

=== 2008–2009 season ===
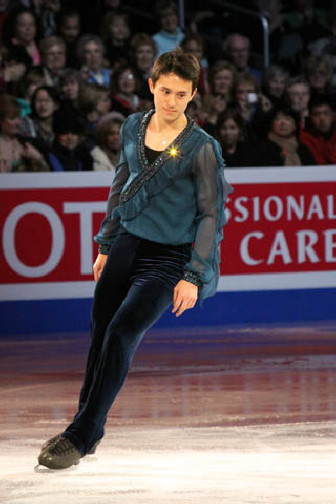
Chan during his exhibition at the 2009 World Championships

Chan won gold medals at both of his Grand Prix events, the 2008 Skate Canada International and 2008 Trophée Éric Bompard, thereby qualifying for the 2008–09 Grand Prix Final as the highest qualifier. He placed fifth in the final.

He competed at the 2009 Canadian Championships as the defending champion. He placed first in the short program and entered the final segment with a 17.00-point lead. During the free skate, he stepped out from a 3F, which was to be combined with a 3T, but landed two 3A jumps cleanly for the first time in his career. He won the free skate by a margin of 30.96 points and took gold with a total margin of 48.52 points over silver medallist Vaughn Chipeur.

At his only appearance at the 2009 Four Continents Championships, Chan placed first in the short program, in which he received level 4 for all his spins and for his straight–line footwork. His score gave him a lead of over 7.25 points above the second–place finisher Evan Lysacek. He also won the free skate, executing a 3F–3T combination, as well as a 3Lz–2T–2Lo combination and receiving level four for all his spins and straight–line footwork. He outscored silver medalist Evan Lysacek by 12.04 points to win the gold medal.

At the 2009 World Championships, Chan placed third in the short program, behind Brian Joubert and Evan Lysacek, and second in the free skate to win the silver medal behind Lysacek. He was eighteen. He also competed for Canada at the 2009 World Team Trophy. He placed fourth in the men's competition and Canada won the silver overall, behind the United States and ahead of Japan.

During the off-season, Chan performed in the South Korean show Festa on Ice alongside Yuna Kim once again.

=== 2009–2010 season ===
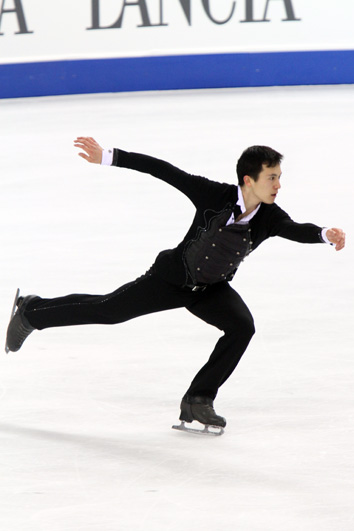
Chan at the 2010 World Championships

In July 2009, Chan landed a quad toe loop jump during a warm-up session at the 2009 Liberty Summer Competition. He did not land it in competition.

Chan was assigned to the 2009 Rostelecom Cup and the 2009 Skate Canada International events for the 2009–10 ISU Grand Prix season.

Chan contracted a suspected case of H1N1 swine flu during a high-performance training camp in Vancouver. The antibiotics treating the illness weakened his muscles, and Chan experienced pain while jumping. This was eventually diagnosed as a gastrocnemius tear in his left calf muscle. It was Chan's first major injury. Chan's injury rehabilitation included a treatment in which his blood was drawn, spun and concentrated, and injected back into his injured muscle. Chan withdrew from the Rostelecom Cup before the event. He placed sixth at the 2009 Skate Canada International. On January 8, 2010, Chan announced a coaching change to Lori Nichol, his long–time choreographer, and Christy Krall, a technical specialist based in Colorado. At the 2010 Canadian Championships, he placed first in the short program, 11.27 points ahead of Vaughn Chipeur, after making a mistake on a 3F and receiving level fours for all his spins and his two step sequences. He won the free skate and took the gold medal with a lead of 45.92 points. He set a record score in the Canadian Championships. He was thereby named to the Olympic team, along with Chipeur.

The 2010 Winter Olympics were held in Chan's home country, Canada. Chan placed seventh in the short program and then earned a new personal best score to place fourth in the free skate, finishing fifth overall. Chan said later that the support of the audience at the event had made him realize how proud he was to be Canadian.

Chan competed once again at the 2010 World Championships. He placed second in the short program, just 1.50 behind the leader, Daisuke Takahashi. He placed second in the free skate, 8.98 points behind Takahashi, to win his second world silver medal. Chan earned US$27,000 in prize money.

During the off-season, he debuted his newest show program, skating to Bobby McFerrin's "Don't Worry, Be Happy", at the Woodstock Skating Club in April 2010. He performed in the show Festa on Ice for the third consecutive year. He also performed in the show All That Skate LA, again headlined by Kim.

=== 2010–2011 season ===
Chan began his season at the 2010 Liberty Summer Competition where he debuted his new short program to the music of Take Five, a jazz piece. He placed first in the short program, landing his first 4T in competition, and was awarded a high grade of execution for the jump. In the free skate, he missed the 4T, but landed a 3A–3T combination for his first time in competition, and took the gold medal.

Chan was assigned to the 2010 Skate Canada International and the 2010 Cup of Russia for the 2010–11 ISU Grand Prix season. At Skate Canada, Chan had a collision with Adam Rippon during the morning practice before the short program. He placed fourth in the short program after falling on his 4T, his 3A, and his step sequence. He won the free skating after landing a 4T and five more triple jumps and finished first overall. It was his first time landing a quad in an ISU competition. Although he fell on a 3A to make it four falls throughout the competition, his total score was high enough to earn the gold medal. Chan also struggled with consistency at 2010 Cup of Russia, accumulating another four falls over the competition. He was first in the short program, where he landed a 4T–3T combination and fell on a 3A. In the free skating, he fell on a quad and two triples. Chan finished second overall, 3.1 points behind Tomáš Verner. His combined placements qualified him for the Grand Prix Final. He commented on his performance: "It really bothered me. The week before Russia, I did four clean free skatings in a row in practice. I just couldn't grasp why I wasn't doing it in competition." Chan sought advice from Olympic champion Brian Boitano, "I had to find another way to force my technique, force my mind to do it properly, even through the times where I didn't feel well. ... I still don't believe in a shrink. They haven't been in our situation, on the ice standing in front of thousands of people."

At the Grand Prix Final, he placed second in the short program, just 1.00 behind Nobunari Oda of Japan. He landed a 4T, a 3A, and a 3F–3T. He won the free skate and his first Grand Prix Final title. He obtained his fourth consecutive Canadian national title at the 2011 Canadian Championships. He placed first in the short program after landing a 4T and a 3F–3T, although he doubled his intended 3A. He won the free skating after completing a 4T, a 4T–3T combination, and six more triple jumps. This was the first time he landed two 4T in the same program. Overall, he won the gold medal with 285.85 points. His free skating and combined total scores were a new record at the Canadian Nationals.

At the 2011 World Championships held in Moscow after a delay of a month, Chan won the short program with a score of 93.02 points, a new world record. In the free skate, he picked up 187.96 points (another world record), giving him a total of 280.98 points for his two days of competition. In September, he received three Guinness World Records certificates for achieving world records in the short program, free skating, and overall score.

Chan consulted with Brian Boitano during the season. During the off-season, he skated in shows in Beijing, Shanghai, Taiwan, and South Korea. He also worked on a quad salchow, although the triple salchow is not his strongest jump.

=== 2011–2012 season ===
Chan worked with Peter Davis, the former sports science director for the US Olympic Committee; choreographer Lori Nichol; Kathy Johnson, a movement and balance coach; Andy O'Brien, a strength, fitness, and nutrition coach; physiotherapist Mark Lindsay; and Eddie Shipstead who helped with quads, using special harnesses which prevent injury. Chan was assigned to 2011 Skate Canada International and 2011 Trophée Eric Bompard as his Grand Prix events. At Skate Canada, Chan placed third in the short program and won the free skating to win the gold medal at the event. He also won the 2011 Trophée Eric Bompard and directly qualified for the 2011–12 Grand Prix Final.

Just before the Final, an interview was released that caused controversy; Chan and Skate Canada officials said that his comments had been misconstrued. In 2011, his expenses were reported to be about CAN$ 150,000. He supported his skating by performing in shows and holding fundraisers. Chan said that his parents had made sacrifices for his skating career and that he felt connected to his Chinese heritage due to the support he received from the Chinese–Canadian community.

In December 2011, Chan competed in the 2011–12 Grand Prix Final. He placed first in the short program, as well as in the free skate, to win the gold medal by an 11.18 point margin over Daisuke Takahashi. Chan competed in the 2012 Canadian Championships in January 2012. During his short program, he landed a 4T–3T combination, a 3A, and a 3Lz, and received level fours for his spins and footwork. He also got 10.00 in his program component scores. He then won the free skate with several 10.00 for his component marks. He won his fifth Canadian title with 302.14 points, by a 62.70–point lead over silver medallist Kevin Reynolds. He set a new record score at the Canadian Nationals.

In February 2012, Chan competed in the 2012 Four Continents Championships. He placed first in the short program, 4.51 ahead of Takahito Mura, and in the free skate, 24.25 ahead of Daisuke Takahashi, and obtained a 10.00 for his program component scores. He won gold with a total score of 273.94 points.

In late March 2012, Chan competed at the 2012 World Championships in Nice, France, and won his second straight World title. He placed first in both segments and finished with a total of 266.11 points, 6.45 ahead of silver medallist Daisuke Takahashi. This result has caused shock and controversy in public. On April 16, 2012, news media reported that Chan had accepted Krall's resignation. He credited Krall with improving his quad jump.

=== 2012–2013 season ===
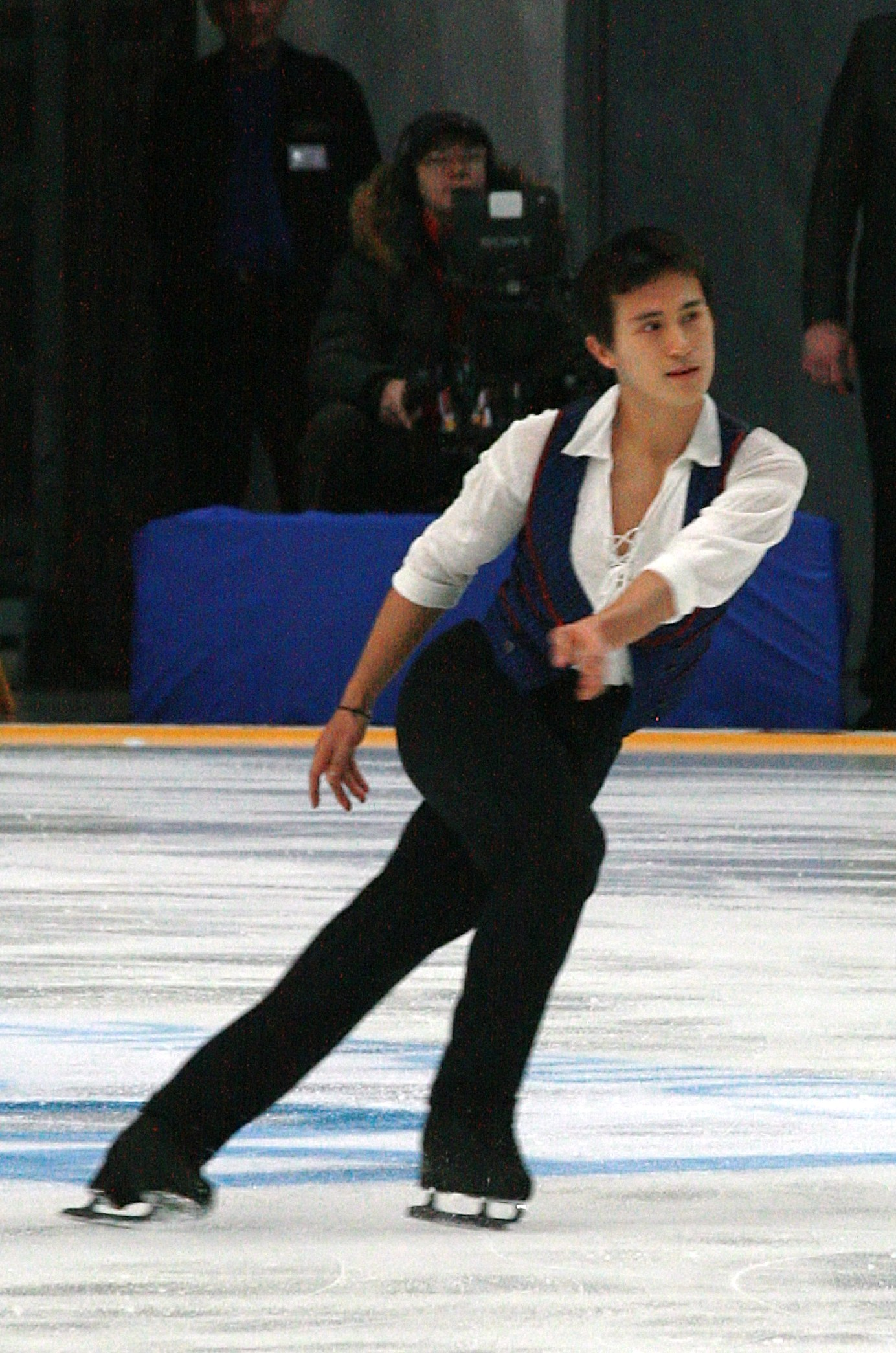
Chan at the 2012 Rostelecom Cup

During the season, Chan was coached by Kathy Johnson and Eddie Shipstead. He left his longtime choreographer Lori Nichol and asked Jeff Buttle and David Wilson to produce his competitive programs.

Opening his season, Chan placed sixth at the Japan Open. At the 2012 Skate Canada International he competed as the defending champion and obtained the silver medal, behind Spain's Javier Fernández. At the 2012 Cup of Russia, he won gold with first–place results in both segments. Chan thus qualified for the 2012–13 Grand Prix Final, where he obtained the bronze medal. During a tour in December, he consulted previous Canadian champions on mental preparation.

In January, at the 2013 Canadian Championships, Chan ranked first in both segments and won his sixth Canadian national title. At the 2013 World Championships, held in London, Ontario, Canada, Chan won the short program where he landed a 4T–3T combination, 3A, and 3Lz, and received level fours in his spins and footwork earning 6.81 points more than Denis Ten from Kazakhstan. He set a new world record score under the ISU Judging System. He committed some mistakes in his jumps in the free skating and placed second in that segment of the competition but obtained enough points to keep the lead. He finished first with 267.78 points overall, edging Ten for the gold medal by 1.3 points. It was Chan's third consecutive World title. The result was debated by many skating experts, some believing that Ten merited the victory.

During the summer of 2013, Chan moved his training base from Colorado to Detroit to continue to work with Kathy Johnson.

=== 2013–2014 season ===
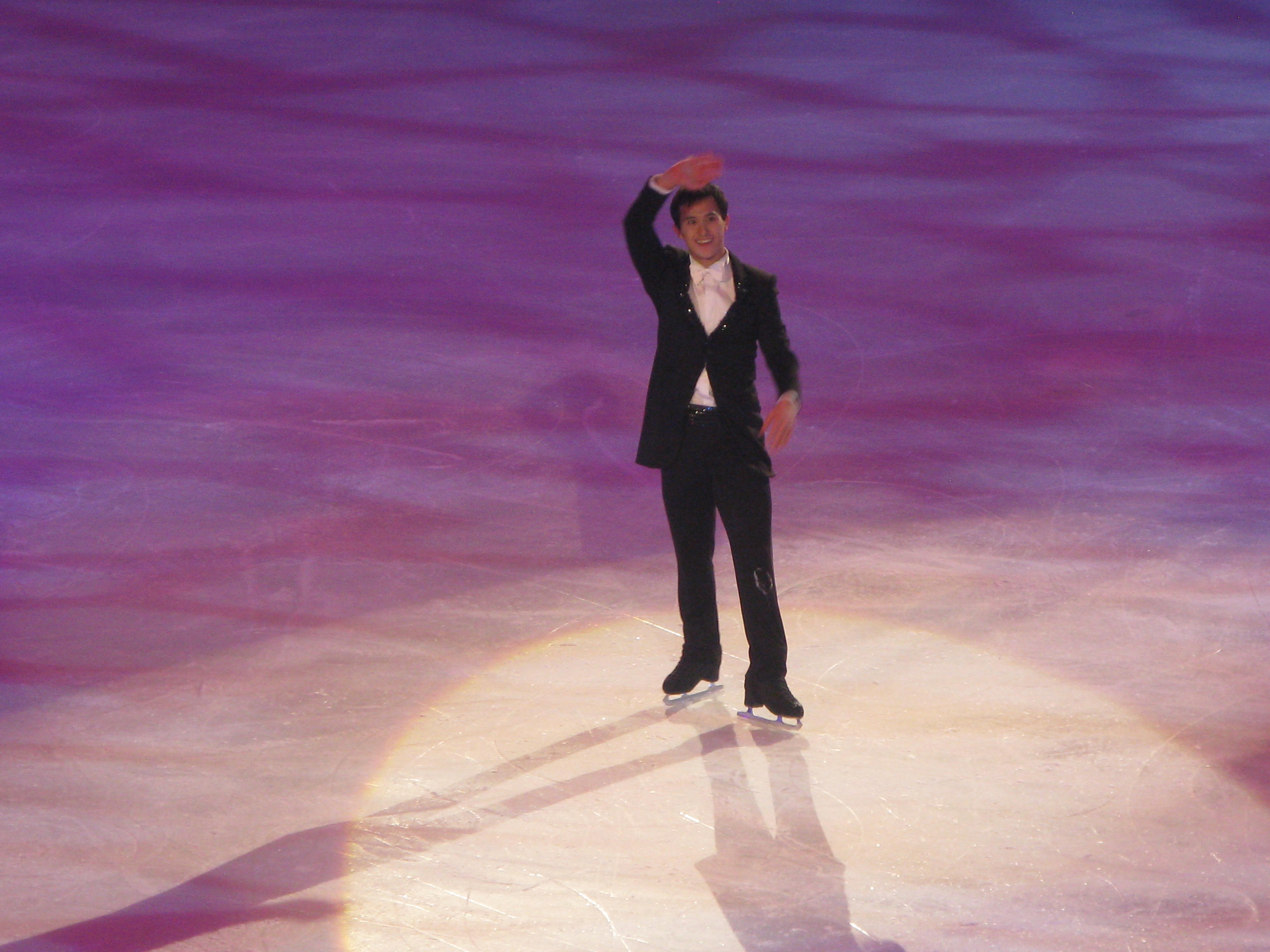
Chan at the 2013 Trophée Éric Bompard

In the 2013–14 ISU Grand Prix season, Chan won both the 2013 Skate Canada International and the 2013 Trophée Éric Bompard with a world record score at the time in both the short program and the free skate. He finished second in the Grand Prix Final, behind Yuzuru Hanyu of Japan.

At the 2014 Winter Olympics, Patrick Chan competed in the inaugural team event. He skated the men's short program and placed third, contributing to Canada's silver medal finish.

During the individual event, Chan ranked second in the short program, scoring 3.93 points less than Hanyu's world record score and more than ten points ahead of the rest of the field. Hanyu's program featured the same jumps as Chan's, but he had achieved better quality and amplitude on the jumps, particularly the triple axel. Hanyu fell twice during his free skate and had another triple discount for putting his foot down in the middle of a jump sequence, while Chan struggled on several of his jumps including a miss on a relatively simple double Axel. As a result, Hanyu outscored Chan in the free skate by 0.54 points to take the gold medal, while Chan received the silver medal.

=== 2014–2015 season ===
In September 2014, Skate Canada announced that Chan would miss most of the 2014–2015 season and return to the competition circuit in the 2015–2016 season. The only exception was the Japan Open invitational event held in October 2014; he placed first with a new free skate.

=== 2015–2016 season ===
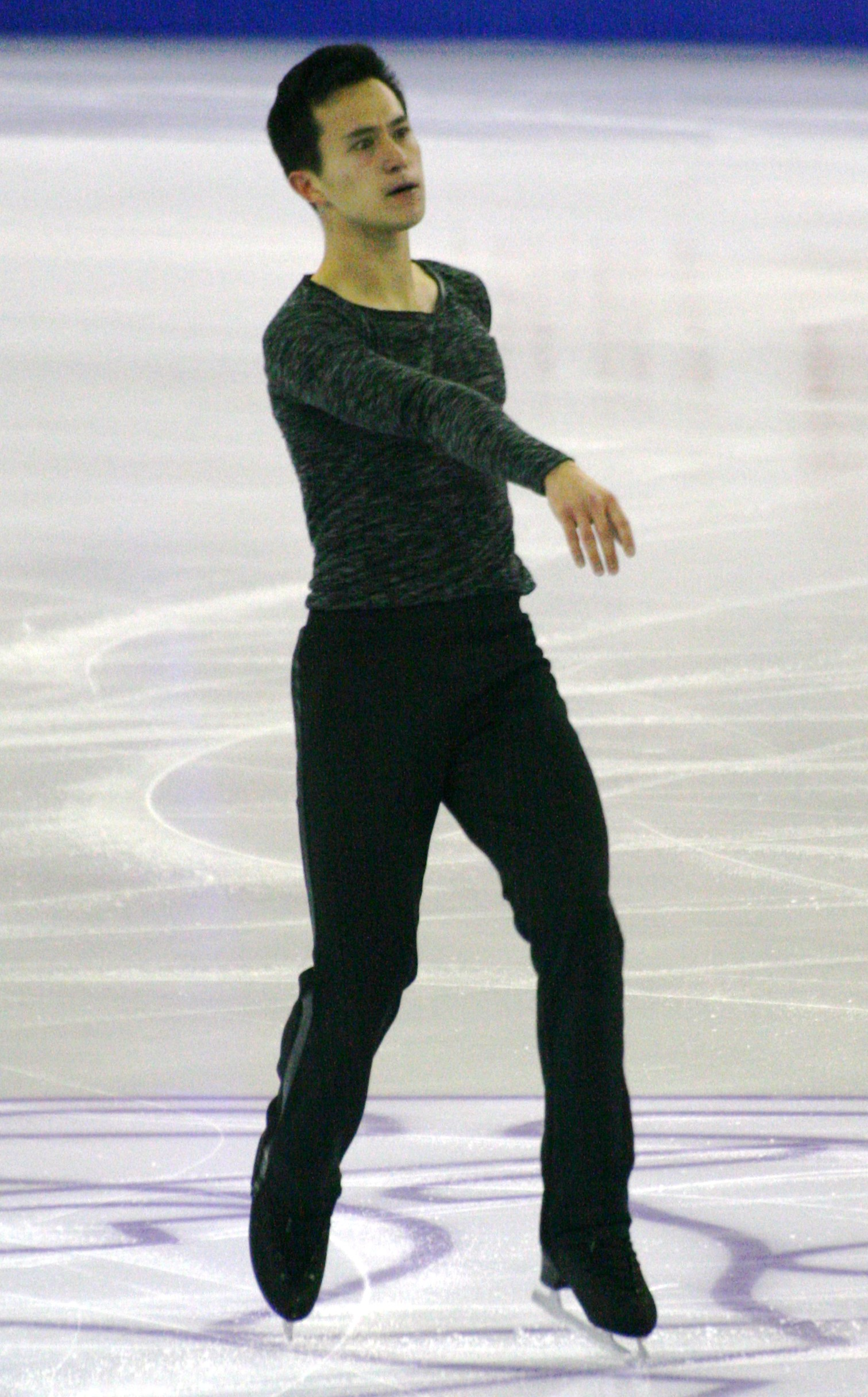
Patrick Chan at the 2015–16 Grand Prix of Figure Skating Final

During the spring of 2015, Chan confirmed in several interviews that he would start training for the 2015–2016 season. He was assigned to compete at the 2015 Skate Canada International and the 2015 Trophée Éric Bompard. He beat the Olympic champion Yuzuru Hanyu to win Skate Canada for a record–tying fifth time. He finished fourth in his return to the Grand Prix Final, placing third in the free skate after landing one quad.

Chan easily nabbed his eighth national title at the 2016 Canadian Figure Skating Championships Chan won gold at the 2016 Four Continents Championships, defeating Jin Boyang and scoring a new personal best in the free skate. He finished fifth at the 2016 World Championships after placing third in the short and fifth in the free.

=== 2016–2017 season ===
Chan and Johnson decided they would move to Vancouver in July 2016. She resigned in August 2016, and the move to Vancouver was put on hold. On September 23, 2016, Chan announced that his new coaching team would be led by Marina Zueva, and his training base would be Canton, Michigan. He would stay in Canton for the entire season.

The high point of Chan's season was winning a record sixth Skate Canada title, breaking the record he had shared with Elvis Stojko, who holds five Skate Canada titles. For the second straight year, Chan outscored Olympic champion Yuzuru Hanyu for the victory. At the Cup of China, he beat world bronze medallist Boyang Jin for gold. He placed second in the short program at the Grand Prix Final but would finish fifth overall.

Chan easily won a record-tying ninth Canadian national title. At the 2017 World Championships, he set his new personal best in the short program of 102.13, putting himself in medal contention in third place, but dropped to fifth after the long program. During the season, he attempted to incorporate a quadruple Salchow into his repertoire in response to the increasing jump difficulty of his top competitors.

=== 2017–2018 season ===
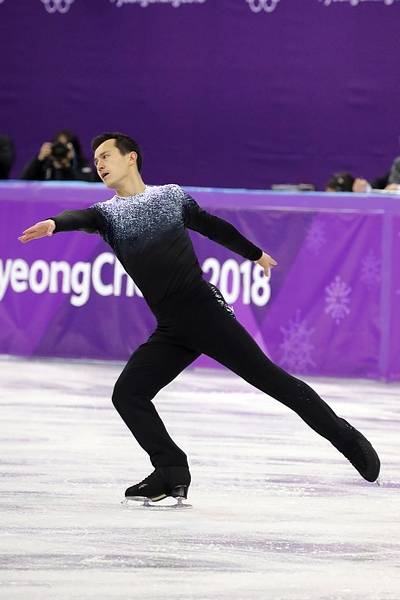
Chan skates his short program at the 2018 Olympics

During his final competitive season, Chan placed fourth at the 2017 Skate Canada International and withdrew from the 2017 NHK Trophy. Following Skate Canada, he moved to Vancouver to take a break, then began training with coach Ravi Walia. In January, he won a record tenth Canadian title at the 2018 Canadian Championships.

In February, Chan represented Canada at his third Olympics, in Pyeongchang, South Korea. He won his first Olympic gold and third Olympic medal overall during the team event, defeating the Olympic Athletes from Russia. He skated both segments, ranking third in the short and first in the free skate. This earned 18 team points for Canada, six more than the Russian skater Mikhail Kolyada. In the individual men's event, Chan finished ninth after placing sixth in the short program and eighth in the free skate. He had tripled a quad attempt, doubled a triple, and touched down with his hand on a triple axel. He stated that this Olympic event was his last competition. He officially retired from competition on April 16, 2018.

=== Later career ===
Chan still participates in major figure skating tours in Canada. In December 2018, he tore a couple of knee ligaments in a skiing accident. He announced that the 2024 Stars on Ice Canada tour will be his last skating on ice in front of an audience.

For the figure skating season of 2018-2019, he was named event ambassador for the ISU Grand Prix of Figure Skating Final in Vancouver.

In 2020, he became an Olympic Committee ambassador and had the distinction of being named the Athlete Role Model for figure skating at the 2020 Winter Youth Olympics in Lausanne, Switzerland.

Chan and Elizabeth Putnam choreographed Seo Min-kyu's free skate to Le temps des cathédrales for the 2023-2024 figure skating season. They previously choreographed his programs for the 2021-2022 and the 2022-2023 seasons.

In 2023, he was named event ambassador for Skate Canada International.

In 2024, he and Joannie Rochette were named event ambassadors for 2024 ISU World Figure Skating Championships in Montreal.

== Skating technique ==
1994 Olympic champion Alexei Urmanov once praised Patrick Chan's skating skills by saying, "All his skating techniques are outstanding beyond all competitors and need no further improvement."

=== Skating skills ===
Chan's skating skills are described as skating which is ahead of the evolution of skating that many skaters have cultivated over the years. 2016 World Champion Eric Radford once described Chan as the "Skater's skaters", whose skating technique is seen by athletes around the world as the standard of performance. He is considered by many as the "King of Skating Skills" with his high–level skating skills, which was considered as the training fruit of Osborne Colson, his first coach. 1992 Olympic champion Viktor Petrenko also said: "You can see why Chan's PCS is so high by counting the number of crossovers he makes during his performance, which is a clear indication that his components are at the highest level."

Chan's high–altitude skating skills are very famous, along with the aesthetics of his programs. Chan's ability to control his movements on the ice is extremely smooth, and is often described as movements on the edges of the skate blade instead of the entire blade like the way of moving on ice commonly seen in other skaters. The ability to control speed on the ice allows Chan to accelerate and gain momentum in a short time to achieve the speed needed, so that he can perform quads in short approach, while a lot other athletes often have to slide a longer distance around the rink to gain momentum when performing quads. In terms of harmony, Chan's programs are also often choreographed with good connection between the jumps. Another unique feature of his skating technique is the one–foot skating technique throughout half the length of the ice rink, and the ability to perform curvilinear movements with large and complex orbits. This masterful one–foot skating technique was demonstrated at the 2011 World Figure Skating Championships in Moscow, with a step sequence performed entirely on one foot and received +2 GOE from the ISU judging panel. Chan has a signature with his unique skating style thanks to his soft knees, deep knee bends as well as the use of the edges of the blades to achieve his ideal skating speed. Since a young age, he has been appreciated for his smooth skating technique, large ice coverage, and ability to engage in acting in competition as well as the artistry of the programs. He is also known for his highly choreographed programs, his skillful edge transitions with ideal deep edges, and his highly flexible and complex step sequences. Chan is thereby considered one of the pioneers of the modern era of men's figure skating with strong programs in both technique and artistry. Since the age of 15, Chan has received a level 4 for the step sequence. His excellent steps and transitions are considered a textbook for ISU judges.

Speaking about Chan's skating technique, coach Marina Zoueva once said that: "Patrick is primarily a performer, not a jumper. He lives by movement on ice, which is probably why he returned to sports. Watching him skate is happiness for a coach".

Commenting on Chan's contributions to the history of figure skating in Canada and around the world, CBC's Pj Kwong wrote: "Chan is the latest in a long line of Canadian men who have made the leap from figure skating champion to figure skating legend. The difference between the two is that champions win titles, while legends change the sport in some way."

=== Jumping techniques ===
In terms of jumping technique, Chan is known mainly for his 6 types of triple jumps (Axel, Lutz, Flip, Salchow, Toe Loop, Loop) including the Triple Axel with 3.5 real turns, and 2 types of quadruple jumps (Toe Loop, Salchow). Since the 2010–2011 season, he has performed 4T jumps in both the short program and free skates and successfully landed a 4T in the short program and two 4T in the free program during 3 consecutive years competing at the World Championships from 2011 to 2013. He landed his first Quad Salchow at the age of 25, during the 2016–2017 season. In addition, he also set a goal to land the 4F in preparation for the 2018 Winter Olympics.

In the early years of his senior career, during the 2008–2009 and 2009–2010 seasons at the 2008 Trophée Éric Bompard and 2009 Skate Canada International, Chan once received edge calls for his 3F, but since then, he has been consistently using the right edge in Flips.

In Chan's free skates at the 2014 Winter Olympics, his 4T–3T combination received +3 GOE from the entire judging panel, the highest GOE for a jumping combination in the men's discipline. On the other hand, Chan's weakness in jumping technique is often shown in the Axel jumps, mostly 3A.

=== Spins ===
In spinning skills, he has often received Level 4 since he participated in the 2006 NHK Trophy at the age of 15. Of all the spinning techniques, Chan's Camel Spin is the most highly valued.

== Records and achievements ==
Chan has broken world records seven times in his career.

Combined total records
Date	Score	Event	Note
April 28, 2011	280.98	2011 World Championships	Chan broke the previous record of 264.41, set by Daisuke Takahashi.
November 16, 2013	295.27	2013 Trophée Éric Bompard	Chan broke his record of 280.98. The record was broken by Yuzuru Hanyu on November 28, 2015.
Short program records
Date	Score	Event	Note
April 27, 2011	93.02	2011 World Championships	The record was broken by Daisuke Takahashi on April 19, 2012.
March 13, 2013	98.37	2013 World Championships	Chan broke the previous record of Yuzuru Hanyu.
November 15, 2013	98.52	2013 Trophée Éric Bompard	Chan broke his record of 98.37. The record was broken by Yuzuru Hanyu on December 5, 2013.
Free skating records
Date	Score	Event	Note
April 28, 2011	187.96	2011 World Championships	Chan broke the previous record of 180.79, set by Takahiko Kozuka.
November 16, 2013	196.75	2013 Trophée Éric Bompard	Chan broke his record of 187.96. The record was broken by Yuzuru Hanyu on November 28, 2015.

== Awards ==
- TD Canada Trust, Chinese Canadian Youth of the Year (2007)
- Asia Network magazine, Asian of the Year in Arts and Sports (2008)
- Ontario Sports Awards, Ontario Male Athlete of the Year (2009, 2011-2013)
- The Globe and Mail, Power List Top 30 (2009)
- Lou Marsh Trophy (2011)
- CBCsports.ca Canadian Athlete of the Year (2011)
- Ontario Sports Hall of Fame, Syl Apps Athlete of the Year Award (2011)
- Sportsnet Canadian Athlete of the Year (2011)
- QMI Agency Canadian Male Athlete of the Year (2011)
- Lionel Conacher Award (The Canadian Press' Canadian male athlete of the year) (2011)
- Queen Elizabeth II Diamond Jubilee Medal (2012)
- Jean Lumb Foundation, Jean Lumb Award, 10th Anniversary Commemorative Award (2007)
- Jean Lumb Foundation, Jean Lumb Award, 15th Anniversary Commemorative Award for Outstanding Achievement (2012)
- John Ralston Saul Award (2012)
- Order of Sport, marking his induction into Canada's Sports Hall of Fame (2024)

== Programs ==
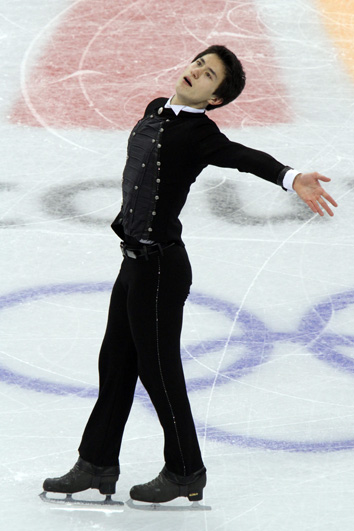
Chan at the Figure skating at the 2010 Winter Olympics – Men's singles

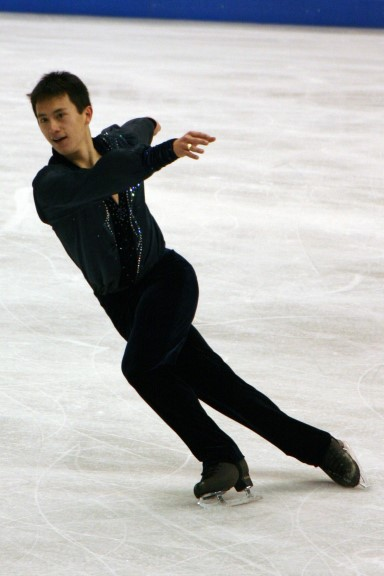
Chan at the 2009 World Figure Skating Championships

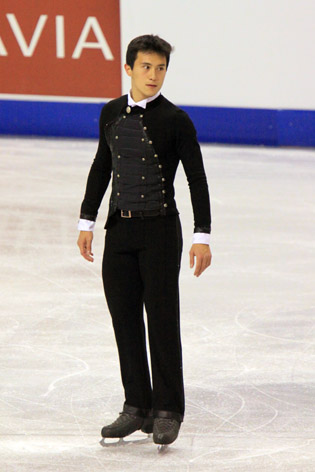
Chan about to perform his The Phantom of the Opera free skating at the 2009 Skate Canada International

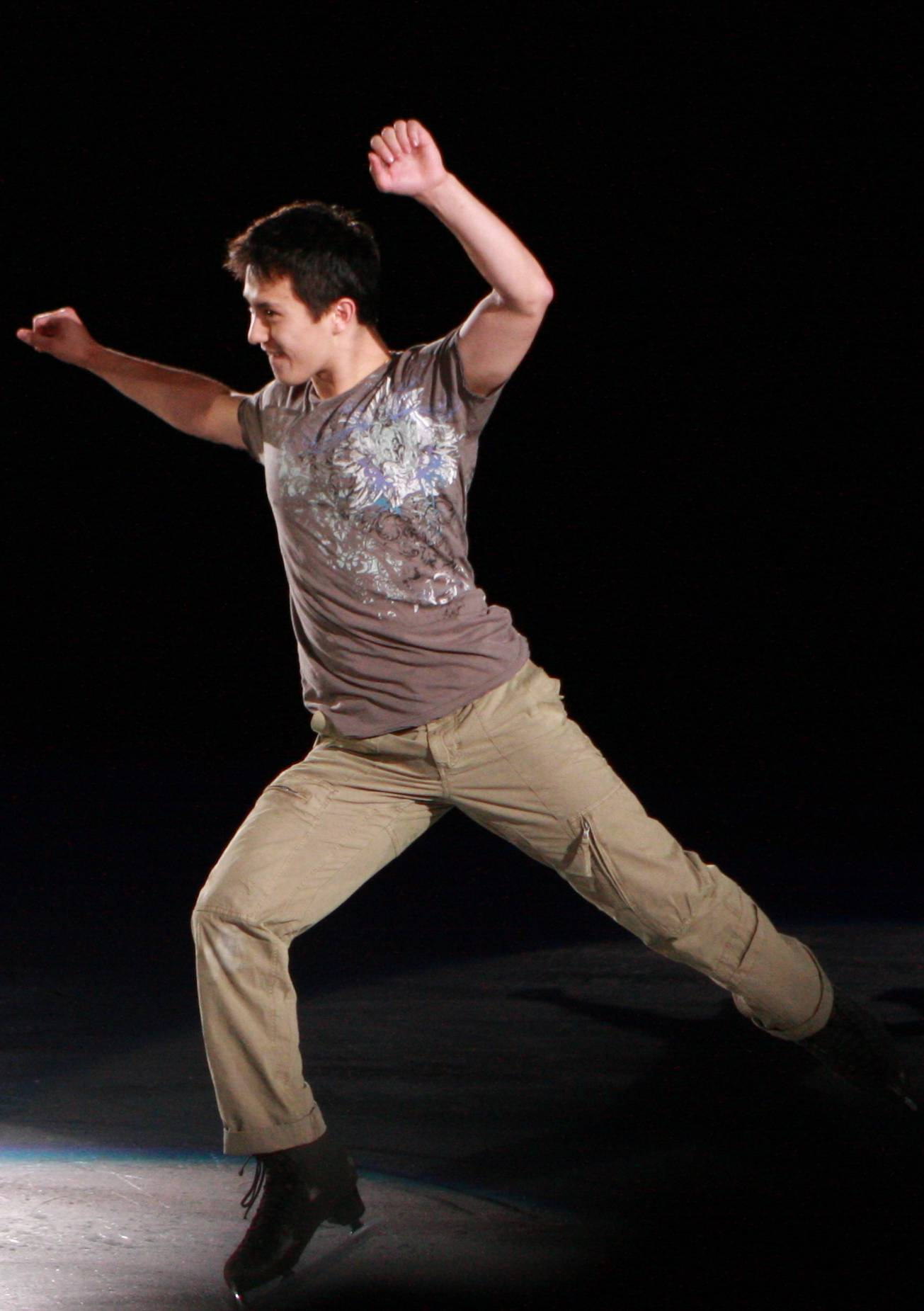
Chan performing his Viva la Vida exhibition program at the 2009 Festa On Ice show

=== Post–2018 ===
Season	Exhibition
2018–2019	Shout by The Isley Brothers, choreo. by Jeffrey Buttle
2018–2019	Suit & Tie by Justin Timberlake, choreo. by Jeffrey Buttle; The Great Escape by Patrick Watson, choreo. by Elizabeth Putnam, Patrick Chan; Storm by Eric Radford; Phantasia (from The Phantom of the Opera), by Andrew Lloyd Webber, performed by Julian Lloyd Webber, Sarah Chang, choreo. by Lori Nichol

=== Pre–2018 ===
Season	Short program	Free skating	Exhibition
2017–2018	Dust in the Wind by Kansas choreo. by David Wilson	Hallelujah by Leonard Cohen covered by Jeff Buckley choreo. by David Wilson	Hallelujah by Leonard Cohen covered by Jeff Buckley choreo. by David Wilson; Lovers in a Dangerous Time by Bruce Cockburn covered by Barenaked Ladies; December 1963 (Oh, What a Night) by The Four Seasons
2016–2017	The Beatles medley: Dear Prudence; Blackbird choreo. by Pasquale Camerlengo	A Journey by Eric Radford choreo. by David Wilson	December 1963 (Oh, What a Night) by The Four Seasons; Sunday Morning by Maroon 5
2015–2016	Mack the Knife performed by Michael Bublé choreo. by David Wilson	Revolutionary Étude; Prelude, Op. 28, No. 4; Scherzo No. 1 by Frédéric Chopin choreo. by David Wilson	Esqualo by Astor Piazzolla choreo. by David Wilson; Mack the Knife performed by Michael Bublé choreo. by David Wilson; Dear Prudence; Blackbird by The Beatles choreo. by Pasquale Camerlengo; Mess Is Mine by Vance Joy choreo. by David Wilson
2014–2015		Revolutionary Étude; Prelude, Op. 28, No. 4; Scherzo No. 1 by Frédéric Chopin choreo. by David Wilson	Dear Prudence; Blackbird by The Beatles choreo. by Pasquale Camerlengo; Mess Is Mine by Vance Joy choreo. by David Wilson; Esqualo by Astor Piazzolla choreo. by David Wilson
2013–2014	Elegie in E Flat Minor by Sergei Rachmaninoff choreo. by Jeffrey Buttle	The Four Seasons by Antonio Vivaldi; Concerto Grosso by Arcangelo Corelli choreo. by David Wilson	Best of Me performed by Michael Bublé; Steppin’Out performed by Tony Bennett choreo. by David Wilson
2012–2013	Elegie in E Flat Minor by Sergei Rachmaninoff choreo. by Jeffrey Buttle	La bohème by Giacomo Puccini choreo. by David Wilson	I Need a Dollar by Aloe Blacc choreo. by Christopher Dean; Mannish Boy by Muddy Waters choreo. by David Wilson; 'Til Kingdom Come by Coldplay choreo. by David Wilson
2011–2012	Take Five by Paul Desmond choreo. by Lori Nichol	Concierto de Aranjuez by Joaquín Rodrigo choreo. by Lori Nichol	Elegie in E Flat Minor by Sergei Rachmaninoff choreo. by Jeffrey Buttle; Mannish Boy by Muddy Waters choreo. by David Wilson; Moondance by Van Morrison performed by Michael Bublé choreo. by Lori Nichol
2010–2011	Take Five by Paul Desmond choreo. by Lori Nichol	Phantasia (from The Phantom of the Opera) by Andrew Lloyd Webber performed by Julian Lloyd Webber, Sarah Chang choreo. by Lori Nichol	Don't Worry, Be Happy by Bobby McFerrin choreo. by Lori Nichol
2009–2010	Tango de los Exilados by Walter Taieb performed by Vanessa-Mae choreo. by Lori Nichol	Phantasia (from The Phantom of the Opera) by Andrew Lloyd Webber performed by Julian Lloyd Webber, Sarah Chang choreo. by Lori Nichol	Yesterday performed by Michael Bolton choreo. by Lori Nichol; Viva la Vida by Coldplay choreo. by Kurt Browning
2008–2009	Tango de los Exilados by Walter Taieb performed by Vanessa-Mae choreo. by Lori Nichol	Selections from Rachmaninoff by Sergei Rachmaninoff choreo. by Lori Nichol	Viva la Vida by Coldplay choreo. by Kurt Browning; Time to Say Goodbye performed by Andrea Bocelli choreo. by Lori Nichol
2007–2008	Exile to Snowy West; In the Bamboo Forest by Tan Dun choreo. by Lori Nichol	The Four Seasons by Antonio Vivaldi choreo. by Lori Nichol	Yesterday performed by Michael Bolton choreo. by Lori Nichol; Nessun dorma choreo. by Mark Hird
2006–2007	Gourmet Valse Tatare by Klaus Badelt choreo. by Lori Nichol	The Four Seasons by Antonio Vivaldi choreo. by Lori Nichol	Nessun dorma choreo. by Mark Hird
2005–2006	La Repression by Lalo Schifrin; Feline by E. van Dijken choreo. by Lori Nichol	Guitar Concerto by John Williams; Symphony No.2 Romantic by H. Hanson; Romance from Concerto for Violin and Orchestra by E. Korngold choreo. by Osborne Colson	
2004–2005	La Repression by Lalo Schifrin; Feline by E. van Dijken choreo. by Lori Nichol	Burn It All; You Go, We Go; Fahrenheit 451 (from Backdraft) by Hans Zimmer, Jay Rifkin choreo. by Lori Nichol	

== Competitive highlights ==
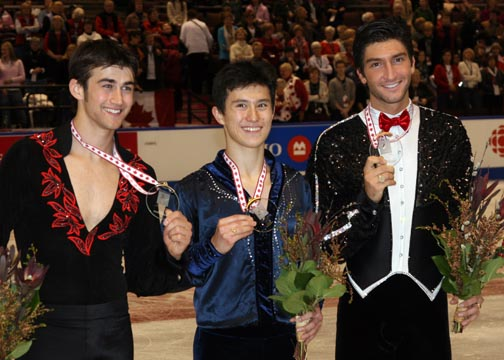
Chan (centre) at the 2008 Skate Canada International

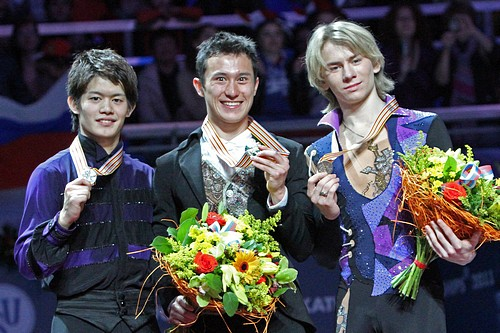
Chan (centre) at the 2011 World Championships

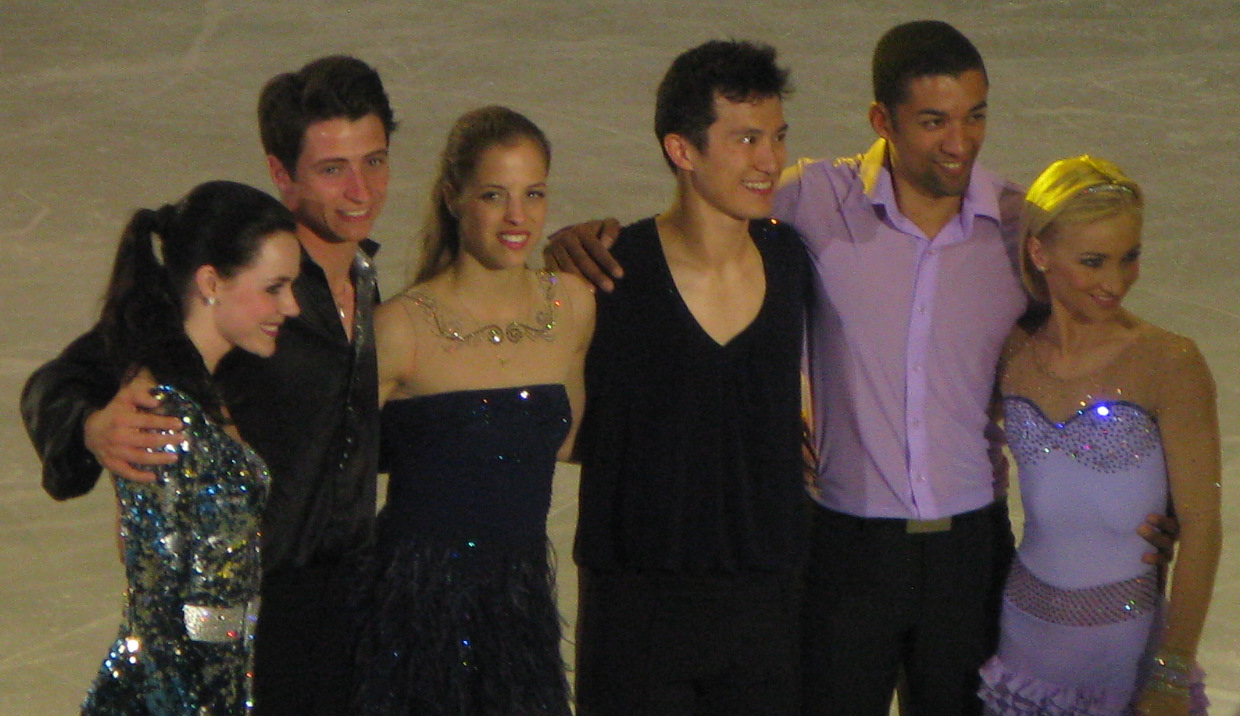
Chan (centre) at the 2012 World Championships

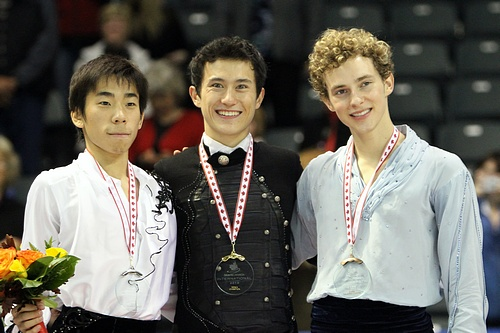
Chan at the 2010 Skate Canada International

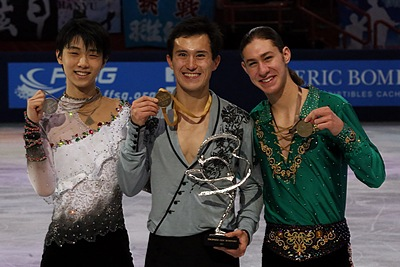
Chan (centre) at the 2013 Trophée Éric Bompard

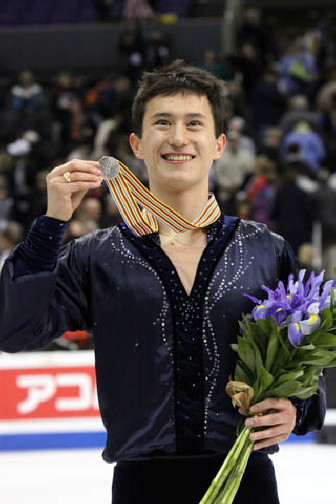
Chan at the 2009 World Championships

- GP – Event of the ISU Grand Prix Series
- JGP – Event of the ISU Junior Grand Prix Series
- CS – Event of the ISU Challenger Series
- Medals at team events are awarded for the team results only. Individual placements at team events are listed in parentheses.

Competition placements at senior level
Season	2005–06	2006–07	2007–08	2008–09	2009–10	2010–11	2011–12	2012–13	2013–14	2014–15	2015–16	2016–17	2017–18
Winter Olympics					5th				2nd				9th
Winter Olympics (Team event)									2nd				1st
World Championships			9th	2nd	2nd	1st	1st	1st			5th	5th	
Four Continents Championships				1st			1st				1st	4th	
Grand Prix Final			5th	5th		1st	1st	3rd	2nd		4th	5th	
Canadian Championships	7th	5th	1st	1st	1st	1st	1st	1st	1st		1st	1st	1st
World Team Trophy				2nd (4th)			3rd (2nd)	2nd (2nd)				4th (5th)	
GP Cup of China												1st	
GP NHK Trophy		7th											
GP Rostelecom Cup						2nd		1st					
GP Skate America			3rd										
GP Skate Canada				1st	6th	1st	1st	2nd	1st		1st	1st	4th
GP Trophée Éric Bompard		5th	1st	1st			1st		1st		5th		
CS Finlandia Trophy												2nd	
Japan Open							1st (1st)	2nd (6th)		2nd (1st)	2nd (3rd)		

Competition placements at junior level
Season	2004–05	2005–06	2006–07
World Junior Championships	6th	6th	2nd
Junior Grand Prix Final		5th	
Canadian Championships	1st		
JGP Canada		1st	
JGP Slovakia		4th	

== Detailed results ==
2017–18 season
Date	Event	SP	FS	Total
February 16–17, 2018	2018 Winter Olympics	6; 90.01	8; 173.42	9; 263.43
February 9–12, 2018	2018 Winter Olympics ^{team event}	3; 81.66	1; 179.75	1^{T}
January 8–14, 2018	2018 Canadian Championships	1; 90.98	1; 181.26	1; 272.24
October 27–29, 2017	2017 Skate Canada International	2; 94.43	7; 151.27	4; 245.70
2016–17 season
Date	Event	SP	FS	Total
April 20–23, 2017	2017 World Team Trophy ^{team event}	6; 85.73	3; 190.74	4^{T}/5^{P} 276.47
March 29 – April 2, 2017	2017 World Championships	3; 102.13	5; 193.03	5; 295.16
February 14–19, 2017	2017 Four Continents Championships	5; 88.46	4; 179.52	4; 267.98
January 16–22, 2017	2017 Canadian Championships	1; 91.50	1; 205.36	1; 296.86
December 8–11, 2016	2016–17 Grand Prix Final	2; 99.76	5; 166.99	5; 266.75
November 18–20, 2016	2016 Cup of China	3; 83.41	1; 196.31	1; 279.72
October 28–30, 2016	2016 Skate Canada International	1; 90.56	2; 176.39	1; 266.95
October 6–10, 2016	2016 Finlandia Trophy	3; 84.59	2; 164.14	2; 248.73
2015–16 season
Date	Event	SP	FS	Total
March 28 – April 3, 2016	2016 World Championships	3; 94.84	8; 171.91	5; 266.75
February 16–21, 2016	2016 Four Continents Championships	5; 86.22	1; 203.99	1; 290.21
January 18–24, 2016	2016 Canadian Championships	1; 103.58	1; 192.09	1; 295.67
December 10–13, 2015	2015–16 Grand Prix Final	6; 70.61	3; 192.84	4; 263.45
November 13, 2015	2015 Trophée Éric Bompard^{C}	5; 76.10	N/A	5; 76.10
Oct 30 – November 1, 2015	2015 Skate Canada International	2; 80.81	1; 190.33	1; 271.14
October 3, 2015	2015 Japan Open	–	3; 159.14	2^{T}
2014–15 season
Date	Event	SP	FS	Total
October 4, 2015	2014 Japan Open	–	1; 178.17	2^{T}
2013–14 season
Date	Event	SP	FS	Total
February 13–14, 2014	2014 Winter Olympics	2; 97.52	2; 178.10	2; 275.62
February 6–9, 2014	2014 Winter Olympics ^{team event}	3; 89.71	–	2^{T}
January 9–15, 2014	2014 Canadian Championships	1; 89.12	1; 188.30	1; 277.42
December 5–8, 2013	2013–14 Grand Prix Final	2; 87.47	2; 192.61	2; 280.08
November 15–17, 2013	2013 Trophée Éric Bompard	1; 98.52	1; 196.75	1; 295.27
October 25–27, 2013	2013 Skate Canada International	1; 88.10	1; 173.93	1; 262.03
2012–13 season
Date	Event	SP	FS	Total
April 11–14, 2013	2013 ISU World Team Trophy ^{team event}	1; 86.67	5; 153.54	2^{T}/2^{P} 240.21
March 10–17, 2013	2013 World Championships	1; 98.37	2; 169.41	1; 267.78
January 13–20, 2013	2013 Canadian Championships	1; 94.63	1; 179.12	1; 273.75
December 6–9, 2012	2012–13 Grand Prix Final	2; 89.27	4; 169.39	3; 258.66
November 9–11, 2012	2012 Rostelecom Cup	1; 85.44	1; 176.91	1; 262.35
October 26–28, 2012	2012 Skate Canada International	2; 82.52	2; 160.91	2; 243.43
October 6, 2012	2012 Japan Open	–	6; 137.42	2^{T}
2011–12 season
Date	Event	SP	FS	Total
April 19–22, 2012	2012 ISU World Team Trophy ^{team event}	2; 89.81	2; 170.65	3^{T}/2^{P} 260.46
March 25 – April 1, 2012	2012 World Championships	1; 89.41	1; 176.70	1; 266.11
February 7–12, 2012	2012 Four Continents Championships	1; 87.95	1; 185.99	1; 273.94
January 16–22, 2012	2012 Canadian Championships	1; 101.33	1; 200.81	1; 302.14
December 8–11, 2011	2011–12 Grand Prix Final	1; 86.63	1; 173.67	1; 260.30
November 18–20, 2011	2011 Trophée Éric Bompard	1; 84.16	1; 156.44	1; 240.60
October 27–30, 2011	2011 Skate Canada International	3; 83.28	1; 170.46	1; 253.74
October 1, 2011	2011 Japan Open	–	1; 159.93	1^{T}
2010–11 season
Date	Event	SP	FS	Total
April 24 – May 1, 2011	2011 World Championships	1; 93.02	1; 187.96	1; 280.98
January 17–23, 2011	2011 Canadian Championships	1; 88.78	1; 197.07	1; 285.85
December 9–12, 2010	2010–11 Grand Prix Final	2; 85.59	1; 174.16	1; 259.75
November 19–21, 2010	2010 Cup of Russia	1; 81.96	2; 145.25	2; 227.21
October 28–31, 2010	2010 Skate Canada International	4; 73.20	1; 166.32	1; 239.52
2009–10 season
Date	Event	SP	FS	Total
March 22–28, 2010	2010 World Championships	2; 87.80	2; 159.42	2; 247.22
February 14–27, 2010	2010 Winter Olympic Games	7; 81.12	4; 160.30	5; 241.42
January 11–17, 2010	2010 Canadian Championships	1; 90.14	1; 177.88	1; 268.02
November 19–22, 2009	2009 Skate Canada International	6; 68.64	6; 130.13	6; 198.77
2008–09 season
Date	Event	SP	FS	Total
April 15–19, 2009	2009 ISU World Team Trophy ^{team event}	9; 66.03	2; 151.95	2^{T}/4^{P} 217.98
March 23–29, 2009	2009 World Championships	3; 82.55	2; 155.03	2; 237.58
February 4–8, 2009	2009 Four Continents Championships	1; 88.90	1; 160.29	1; 249.19
January 14–18, 2009	2009 Canadian Championships	1; 88.89	1; 165.93	1; 254.82
December 11–14, 2008	2008–09 Grand Prix Final	6; 68.00	5; 137.16	5; 205.16
November 13–16, 2008	2008 Trophée Éric Bompard	1; 81.39	1; 156.70	1; 238.09
Oct 31 – November 2, 2008	2008 Skate Canada International	2; 77.47	3; 137.98	1; 215.45
2007–08 season
Date	Event	SP	FS	Total
March 17–23, 2008	2008 World Championships	7; 72.81	11; 130.74	9; 203.55
January 16–20, 2008	2008 Canadian Championships	2; 73.42	1; 159.26	1; 232.68
December 13–16, 2007	2007–08 Grand Prix Final	6; 68.86	5; 139.27	5; 208.13
November 15–18, 2007	2007 Trophée Éric Bompard	2; 70.89	1; 144.05	1; 214.94
October 25–28, 2007	2007 Skate America	3; 67.47	3; 145.86	3; 213.33

=== Pre–2007 ===
- QR = Qualifying round; SP = Short program; FS = Free skating

2006–07 season
Date	Event	Level	QR	SP	FS	Total
Febr. 26 – March 4, 2007	2007 World Junior Championships	Junior	– –	1; 64.10	4; 120.45	2; 184.55
January 15–21, 2007	2007 Canadian Championships	Senior	– –	11; 57.42	5; 130.12	5; 187.54
Nov 30 – December 3, 2006	2006 NHK Trophy	Senior	– –	8; 60.80	6; 113.54	7; 174.34
November 17–19, 2006	2006 Trophée Éric Bompard	Senior	– –	6; 57.82	5; 122.10	5; 179.92
2005–06 season
Date	Event	Level	QR	SP	FS	Total
March 6–12, 2006	2006 World Junior Championships	Junior	6; 105.10	3; 59.54	6; 108.65	6; 168.19
January 9–15, 2006	2006 Canadian Championships	Senior	4; 29.75	6; 63.85	10; 108.71	7; 202.31
November 24–27, 2005	2005 ISU Junior Grand Prix Final	Junior	– –	9; 43.72	3; 110.88	5; 154.60
September 22–25, 2005	2005 ISU Junior Grand Prix, Canada	Junior	– –	2; 52.82	1; 115.01	1; 167.83
September 1–4, 2005	2005 ISU Junior Grand Prix, Slovakia	Junior	– –	8; 47.27	3; 100.72	4; 147.99
2004–05 season
Date	Event	Level	QR	SP	FS	Total
Feb 28 – March 6, 2005	2005 World Junior Championships	Junior	2; 110.22	11; 53.24	6; 107.77	7; 161.01
January 17–23, 2005	2005 Canadian Championships	Junior	– –	1; 53.08	1; 98.79	1; 151.87
