= Festa on Ice =

Figure skating show

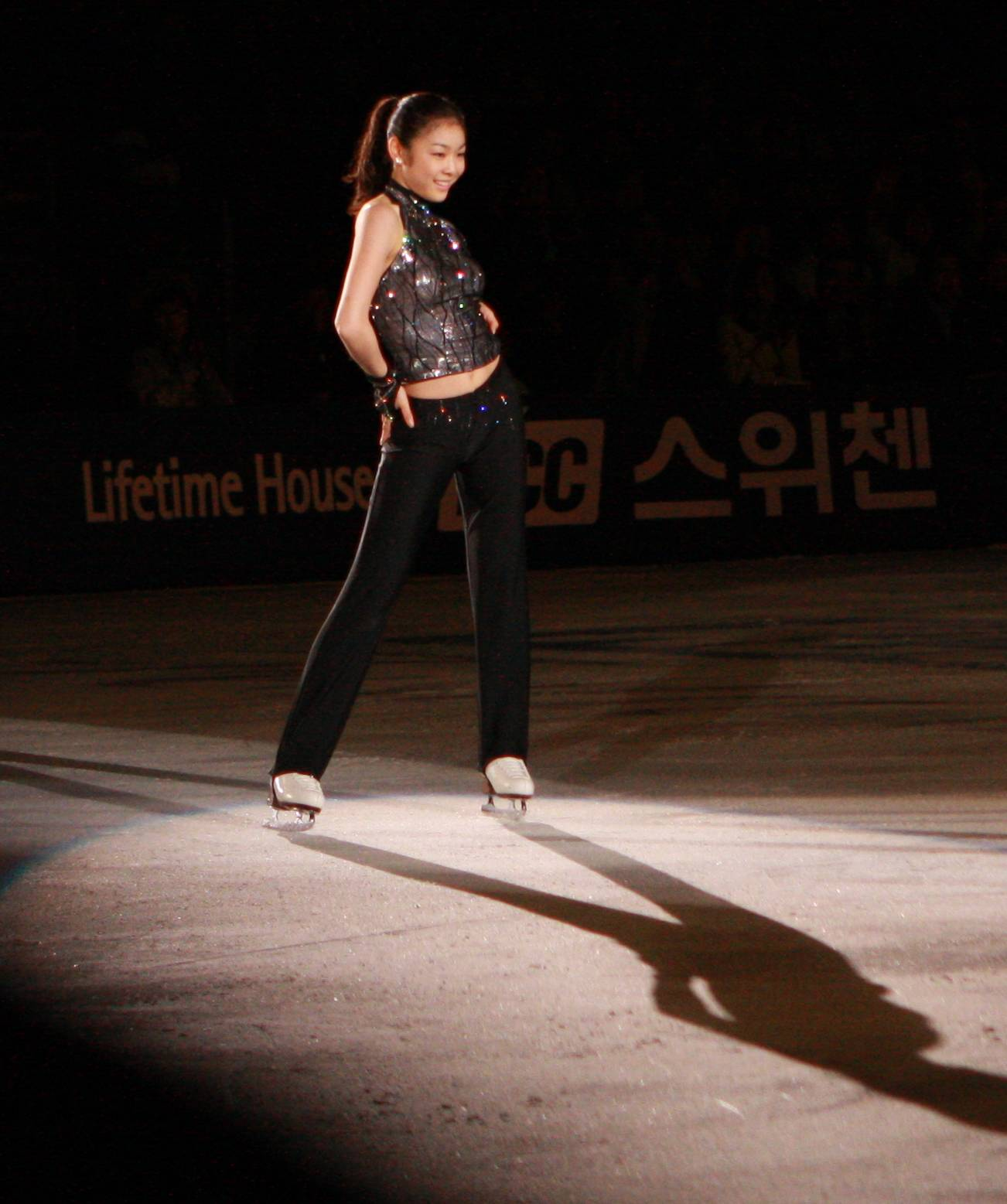
Kim Yuna at the 2009 Festa on Ice

Festa on Ice is a figure skating show that IB Sports produced. 2010 Winter Olympic champion Kim Yuna is a former client of IB Sports, a sports agency based in Seoul, South Korea.

== 2010 Festa on Ice ==
The 2010 Festa on Ice was held at the Olympic Gymnastics Arena in Seoul, South Korea on April 16–18, 2010. It was directed by Brian Orser and choreographed by David Wilson.

=== The cast for 2010 ===
(South Korea) Kim Yuna
(South Korea) Kwak Min-jeong
(Canada) Shae-Lynn Bourne
(Finland) Kiira Korpi
(Canada) Brian Orser
(Canada) Patrick Chan
(Czech Republic) Tomáš Verner
(France) Brian Joubert
(Russia) Ilia Kulik
(China) Zhang Hao & Zhang Dan
(Russia) Oksana Domnina & Maxim Shabalin
(Canada) Edrea Khong & Edbert Khong

=== Programs ===
==== Act 1 ====
- Opening
  - Kim Yuna - "I Believe" by Nikki Yanofsky
  - All Skaters - "I Gotta Feeling" by The Black Eyed Peas
- Tomáš Verner - "Volare" by Gipsy Kings
- Kwak Min-jeong - "Marshmallow" by IU
- Brian Joubert - "Madeleine" by Jacques Brel
- Kiira Korpi - "Butterfly" by Rajaton
- Dan Zhang & Hao Zhang - "Moulin Rouge!", soundtrack by Craig Armstrong & Marius de Vries
- Patrick Chan - "Viva La Vida" by Coldplay
- Ilia Kulik - "Mad" by Ne-Yo
- Shae-Lynn Bourne - "Bridge Over Troubled Water" by Simon & Garfunkel
- Oksana Domnina & Maxim Shabalin - "Aboriginal Dance" arrangement by Alexander Goldstin
- Kim Yuna - "Méditation" from Thaïs by Jules Massenet
- Closing - "Theme from Mission Impossible" by Adam Clayton
  - Men's skater : Ilia Kulik, Brian Joubert, Patrick Chan, Tomáš Verner, Hao Zhang

==== Act 2 ====
- Opening - "Run Devil Run" by Girls' Generation
  - Ladies' skater : Kim Yuna, Shae-Lynn Bourne, Kiira Korpi, Dan Zhang, Kwak Min-jeong
- Edrea Khong & Edbert Khong - "Let's Get Loud" by Jennifer Lopez
- Kiira Korpi - "If I Were A Boy" by Beyoncé
- Patrick Chan - "Don't Worry, Be Happy" by Bobby McFerrin
- Tomáš Verner - "Always Look on the Bright Side of Life" by Monty Python
- Kwak Min-jeong - "The Voice Within" by Christina Aguilera
- Oksana Domnina & Maxim Shabalin - The Matrix soundtrack by Don Davis
- Brian Joubert - "Sandstorm" by Darude
- Shae-Lynn Bourne - "The Sound of San Francisco" by the Global Deejays
- Ilia Kulik - "Mustang Nismo" by Brian Tyler
- Dan Zhang & Hao Zhang - "Almost Here" by Delta Goodrem & Brian McFadden
- Brian Orser - "Thunderball & Into Miami/Alpine Drive"
- Kim Yuna - "007 James Bond Medley" by Monty Norman, John Barry and David Arnold
- Finale - "Abracadabra" by Brown Eyed Girls
- Encore - "Magic" by Brown Eyed Girls

== 2009 Festa on Ice ==
The 2009 Festa on Ice was held at the KINTEX center in Goyang City, Gyeonggi Province, in South Korea on April 24–26, 2009. It was directed by Brian Orser and choreographed by David Wilson and Lho Ji-Hyun. The tickets sold out in just 20 minutes.

=== The cast for 2009 ===
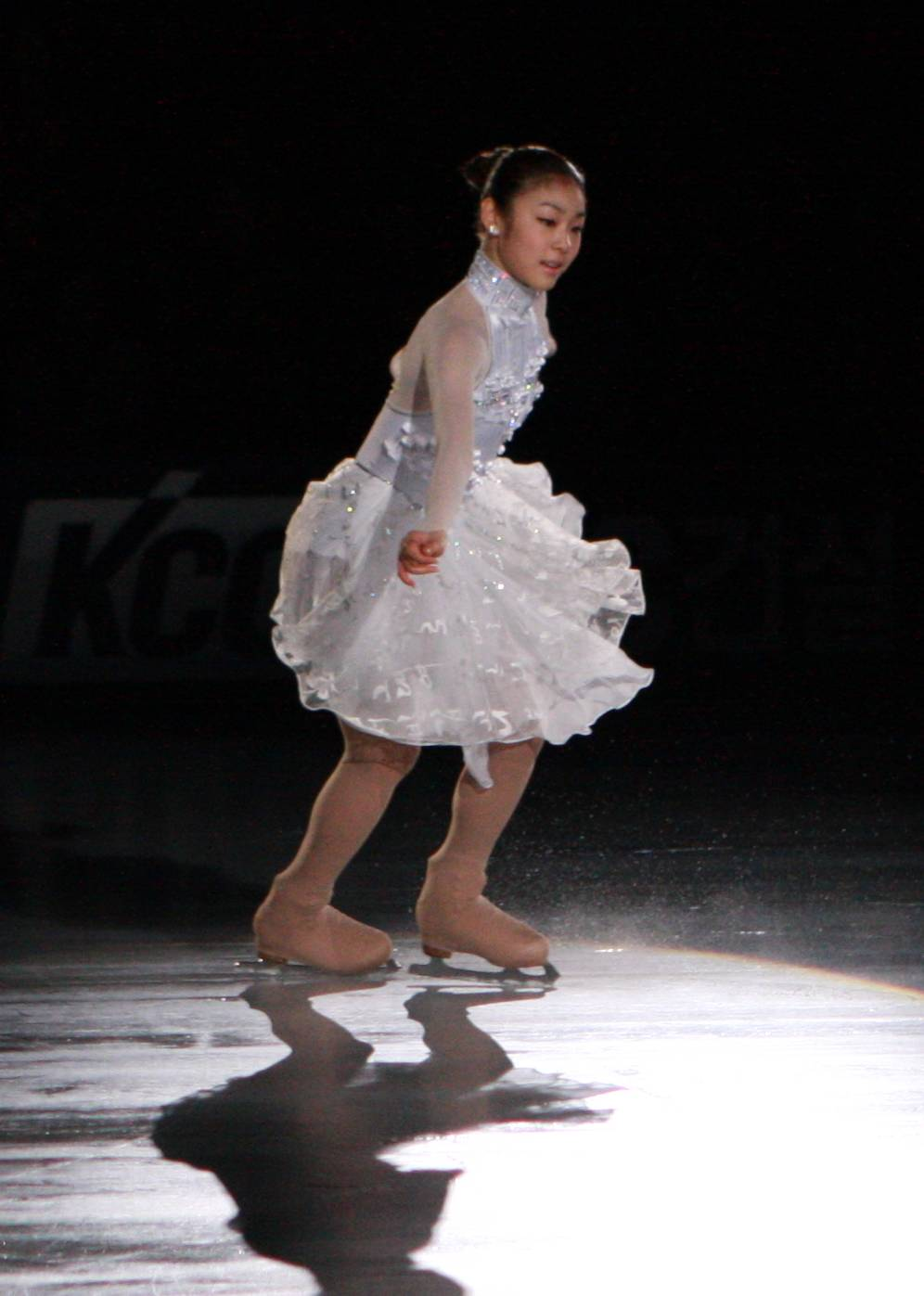
Kim Yuna at the 2009 Festa on Ice

(South Korea) Kim Yuna
(South Korea) Shin Yea-Ji
(South Korea) Yun Yea-ji
(South Korea) Kim Min-seok
(Japan) Shizuka Arakawa
(United States) Alissa Czisny
(Canada) Patrick Chan
(Switzerland) Stéphane Lambiel
(United States) Adam Rippon
(United States) Jeremy Abbott
(United States) Johnny Weir
(China) Zhang Hao & Zhang Dan
(Canada) Tessa Virtue & Scott Moir

Special guests

- Big Mama - singing group
- Gambler Crew - B-boy team
- Son Yeon-Jae - rhythmic gymnast

=== Episode ===
During the show, all skaters enjoyed a traditional Korean game called "gongginori", which some of the Korean skaters taught to the other skaters.

=== Programs ===
The 2009 Festa on Ice was different from other ice shows. A large screen showed video arts for the exhibitions of skaters. Performers presented unique programs such as a battle between B-boys and skaters.

==== Act 1 ====
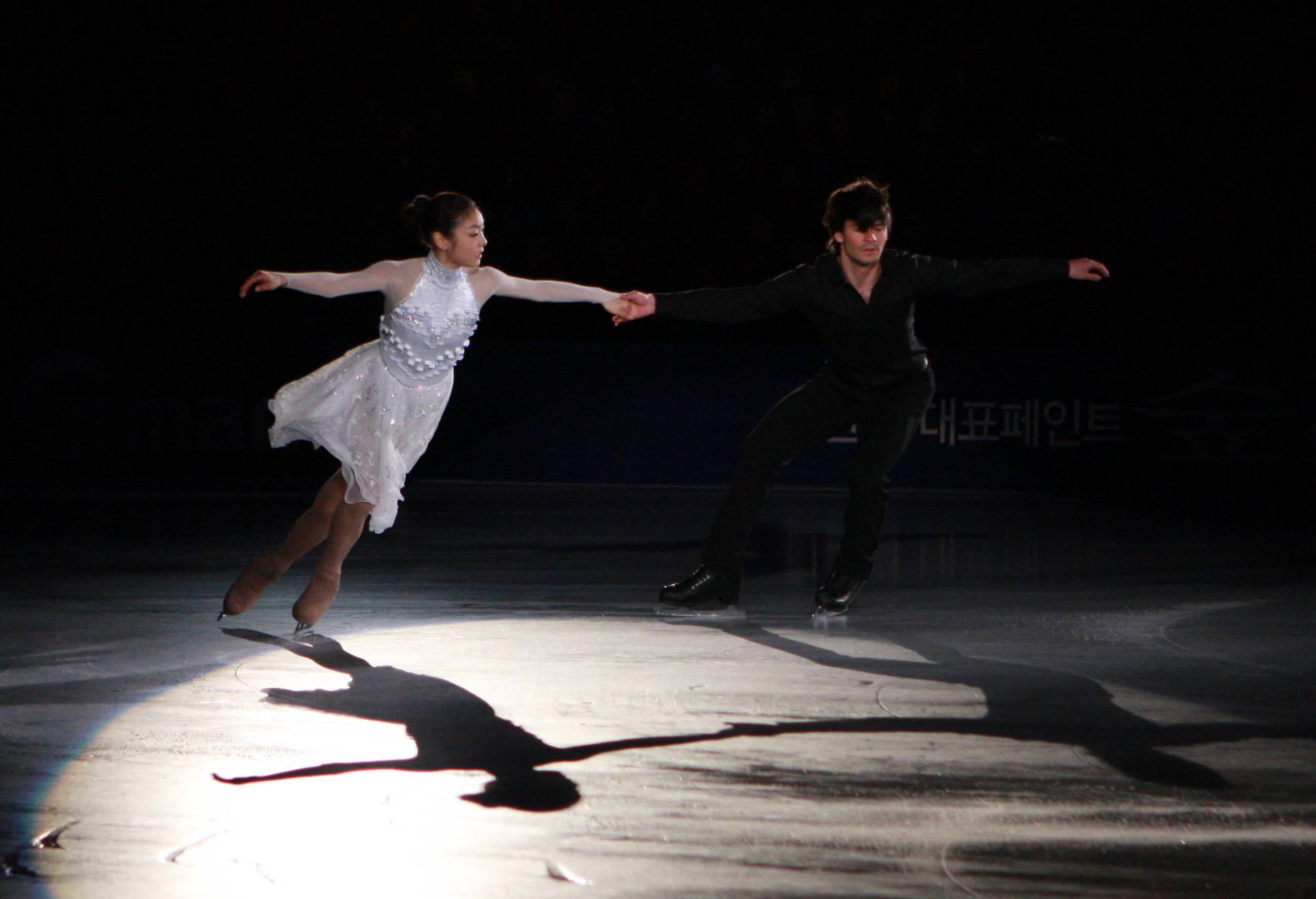
Kim Yuna and Stéphane Lambiel at the 2009 Festa on Ice

- Son Yeon-Jae - "Walking in the Air" by Nightwish
- Opening
  - Kim Yuna & Stéphane Lambiel - "The Point of No Return" from the musical The Phantom of the Opera
  - All skaters - "Masquerade"
  - Introduction of all skaters - "The Phantom of the Opera"
- Shin Yea-Ji - "You Rock My World", "Beat It" by Michael Jackson
- Adam Rippon - "Desperado" by Westlife
- Dan Zhang & Hao Zhang - "Riding on the Wings of Songs" by Felix Mendelssohn
- Kim Min-seok - "Maria" from the musical West Side Story
- Jeremy Abbott - "Gotta Get Thru This (Acoustic Version)" by Daniel Bedingfield
- Alissa Czisny - "Bridge over Troubled Water" by Simon & Garfunkel
- Patrick Chan - "Viva La Vida" by Coldplay
- Johnny Weir - "넌 감동이었어 (You Made Me Impressed)" by Sung Si Kyung
- Tessa Virtue & Scott Moir - "Won't You Charleston with Me" from the musical The Boy Friend
- Stéphane Lambiel - "Un Giorno Per Noi" by Musical Giulietta e Romeo
- Shizuka Arakawa - "Frozen" by Madonna
- Kim Yuna - "Don't Stop the Music" by Rihanna
- Men skaters & Gambler Crew - "Mirotic" by 동방신기, "10점 만점에 10점(10 out of 10)" by 2PM

==== Act 2 ====
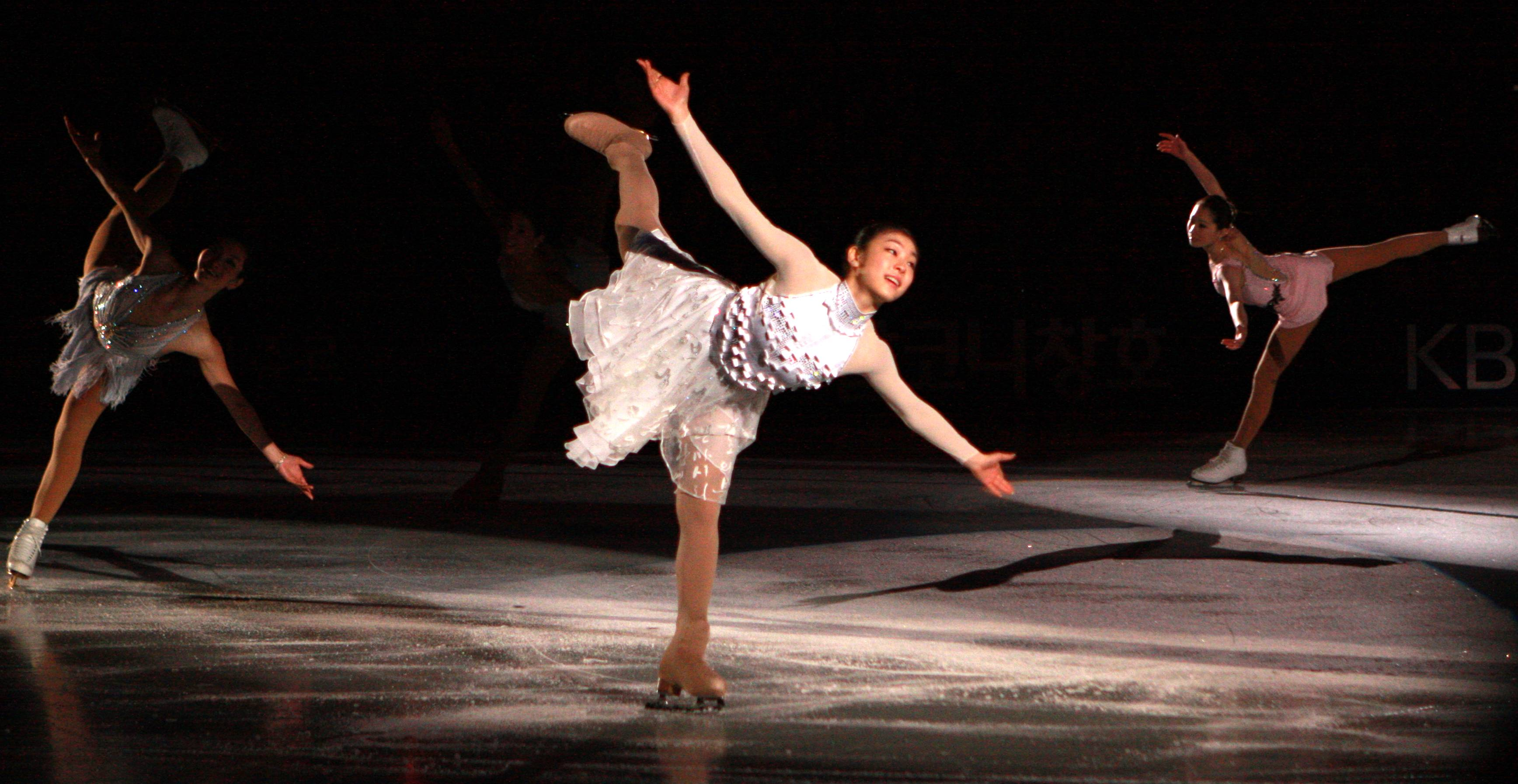
Shizuka Arakawa (left), Kim Yuna (center), Zhang Dan (right) and Alyssa Czisny (back) performing a spiral at the 2009 Festa on Ice

- Team Blessing (synchronized skating) - "Good Morning Baltimore" by Musical Hairspray
- Lady skaters - "Mamma Mia" from the musical Mamma Mia!
- Yun Yea-ji - "Memory" from the musical Cats
- Adam Rippon - "I'm Yours" by Jason Mraz
- Alissa Czisny - "The Swan" by Camille Saint-Saëns
- Dan Zhang & Hao Zhang - "Canto Della Terra" by Sarah Brightman & Andrea Bocelli
- Jeremy Abbott - "Treat" by Carlos Santana
- Johnny Weir - "Poker Face" by Lady Gaga
- Patrick Chan - "Time to Say Goodbye" by Andrea Bocelli
- Tessa Virtue & Scott Moir - "The Great Gig in the Sky" by Pink Floyd
- Shizuka Arakawa - "Listen" by Beyoncé
- Stéphane Lambiel - "Tainted Love" by Paul Young
- Kim Yuna - "Gold" by Big Mama
- Finale - "Dancing Queen" by Big Mama
- Encore - "It's Raining Men" by Big Mama

== 2008 Festa on Ice ==
2008 Festa on Ice was held on May 17–18, 2008 in the Mokdong Ice Rink in Seoul, South Korea. It was directed by Brian Orser and choreographed by David Wilson.

=== The cast for 2008 ===
The cast for 2008 FOI was the following:

(South Korea) Kim Yuna
(South Korea) Shin Ye-Ji
(South Korea) Yun Yea-ji
(South Korea) Lee Dong-won
(Japan) Shizuka Arakawa
(Switzerland) Sarah Meier
(Canada) Patrick Chan
(Japan) Daisuke Takahashi
(Japan) Nobunari Oda
(United States) Johnny Weir
(Canada) Rachel Kirkland & Eric Radford
(China) Dan Zhang & Hao Zhang
(Germany) Aliona Savchenko & Robin Szolkowy
(Canada) Tessa Virtue & Scott Moir
