= Syl Apps Athlete of the Year Award =

- Description: Award for Ontario's Athlete of the Year
- Location: Ontario, Canada
- Presented by: Ontario Sports Hall of Fame
- Website: oshof.ca

The Syl Apps Athlete of the Year Award, began in 1998 and is awarded by the Ontario Sports Hall of Fame to Ontario's Athlete of the Year. It is named in for Syl Apps, an Olympic and Commonwealth Games pole vaulter and Captain of the Toronto Maple Leafs in the 1940s.

The award is made based on voting by Ontario-based sports writers, broadcasters and personalities who have covered sports in Ontario for at least 10 years, as well as members of the Ontario Sports Hall of Fame Board of Directors and the Hall's Advisory Board. The award is for outstanding and memorable contributions to Ontario sports during the previous calendar year. Athletes may be eligible for the award if they are Ontario-born or Ontario-based.

== Online Voting ==
In 2015, the Ontario Sports Hall of Fame started to poll the public of Ontario to vote online for the next Syl Apps Athlete of the Year award recipient. In its first year, Brooke Henderson was selected by the voters of Ontario as the athlete that best deserved the honour. She received an overwhelming majority of the votes, beating out professional and amateur athletes including Kyle Lowry, Milos Raonic, and Russell Martin.

In 2016, the Ontario Sports Hall of Fame recognized Brad Sinopoli, a Canadian football wide receiver who was playing for the Ottawa Redblacks of the Canadian Football League, as the Syl Apps Athlete of the Year. The online public vote to determine the award recipient concluded on March 31, 2016 with Sinopoli edging out other top professional competitors such as Andre De Grasse, Brooke Henderson and Kadeisha Buchanan to win. He received nearly 30% of total votes cast.

== Winners ==
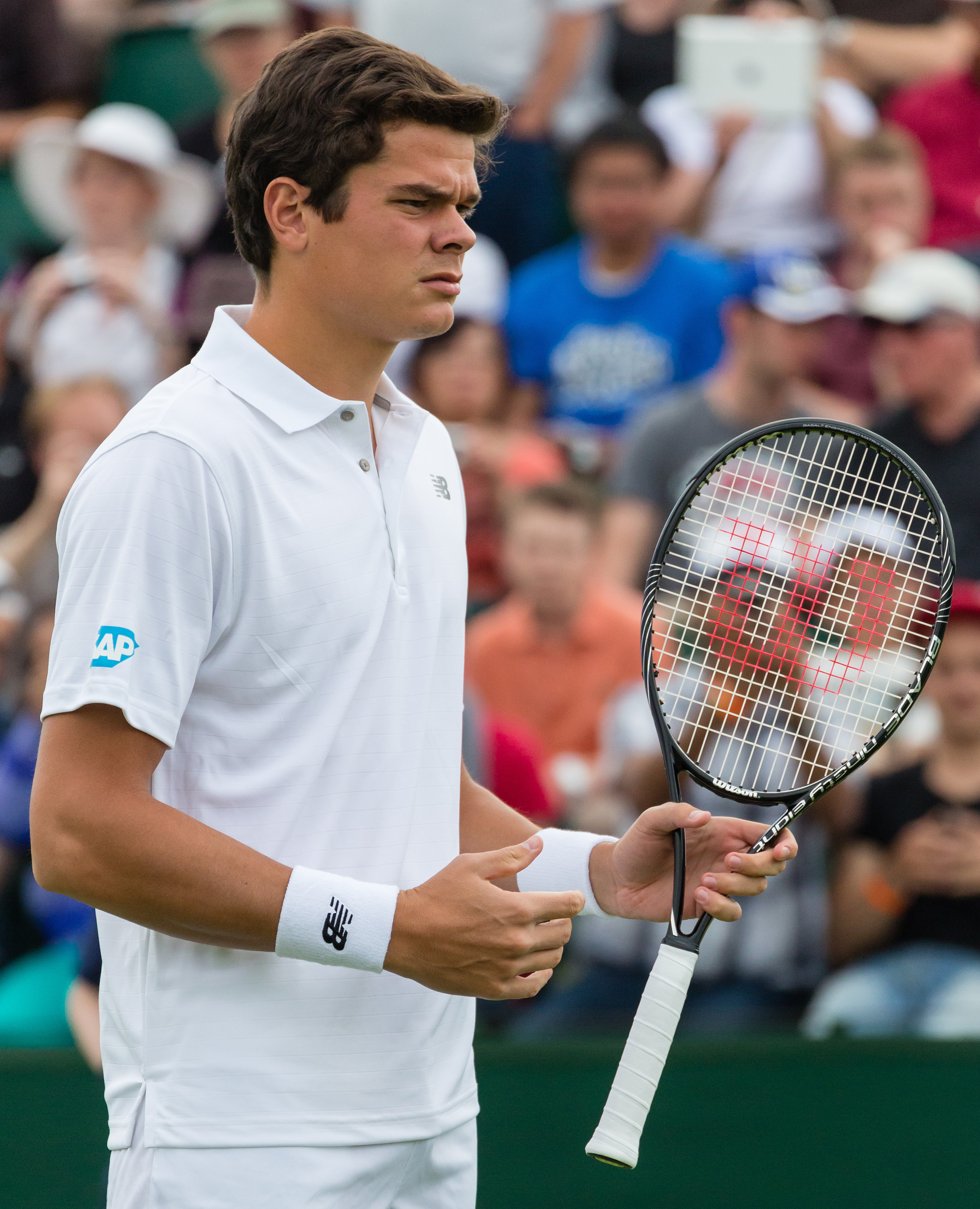
Milos Raonic, 2013 and 2014 winner

Key

- * = Voted by the Ontario public in online poll

Year	Winner	Sport	Win #
1997	Roger Clemens	Baseball	2
1998	Roger Clemens	Baseball	2
1999	Mike Weir	Golf	3
2000	Mike Weir	Golf	3
2001	Vince Carter	Basketball	1
2002	Steve Yzerman	Hockey	1
2003	Mike Weir	Golf	3
2004	Adam Van Koeverden	Rowing	3
2005	Damon Allen	Canadian football	3
2006	None	-	-
2007	None	-	-
2008	Eric Lamaze	Equestrian	1
2009	Daniel Nestor	Tennis	2
2010	Joey Votto	Baseball	1
2011	Patrick Chan	Figure skating	3
2012	Rosie MacLennan	Trampoline gymnastics	1
2013	Milos Raonic	Tennis	2
2014	Milos Raonic	Tennis	2
2015	Brooke Henderson *	Golf	1
2016	Brad Sinopoli *	Canadian football	1
2017	Penny Oleksiak	Swimming	1
2018	Joey Votto	Baseball	1
2019	Tessa Virtue and Scott Moir	Figure skating	1
2020	Bianca Andreescu	Tennis	1
2021	Damian Warner	Track and field	1
2022	Summer McIntosh	Swimming	1
2023	Shai Gilgeous-Alexander	Basketball	1
2024	None	-	-
2025	Summer McIntosh	Swimming	2
2026	Shai Gilgeous-Alexander	Basketball	2
