= Kathy Johnson (figure skating coach) =

Kathy Johnson is a figure skating coach and modern dance instructor. She is known as a coach of Olympic Gold medalist Patrick Chan between 2012 and 2016.

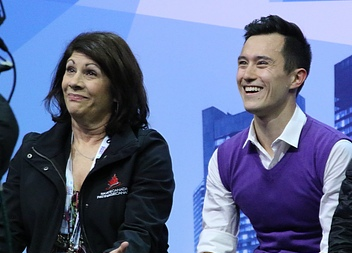
Johnson (left) with Patrick Chan in 2016

== Career ==
Kathy worked with Patrick Chan before his previous coach, Christy Krall, resigned in 2012. Since that, Patrick Chan became two-time Olympic silver medalist in 2014 and World Champion in 2013 during the partnership with Johnson. She resigned in August 2016. Kathy helped Patrick to create his programs. For example, Patrick told his short program ″Dust in the Wind″ was conceived during partnership with Johnson.
