= Ontario Sports Hall of Fame =

- Founded: 1994
- Founder: Bruce Prentice
- Location: Toronto, Ontario, Canada

The Ontario Sports Hall of Fame is an association dedicated to honouring athletes and personalities with outstanding achievement in sports in Ontario, Canada. The hall of fame was established in 1994 by Bruce Prentice, following his 15-year tenure as founder and president of the Canadian Baseball Hall of Fame (CBHF). The inaugural class of honoured members was inducted in 1994.

The OSHOF currently lists 115 inductees, including 101 players and 14 sports personalities. Each year the Ontario Sports Hall of Fame also honours recipients of the Brian Williams Media Award, the Sandy Hawley Community Service Award, the Ferguson Jenkins Heritage Award, the Syl Apps Athlete of the Year Award, and the Bruce Prentice Legacy Award.

== History ==
The Ontario Sports Hall of Fame was established through the efforts of Bruce Prentice, the founder and former President of the Canadian Baseball Hall of Fame (CBHF). Noticing a void in the Canadian Hall of Fame scene, Prentice realized that Ontario was the only province in Canada without its own sports Hall of Fame. Originally called the “Ontario Sport Legends Hall of Fame”, its role on behalf of all Ontarians is to ensure that time will not diminish the nature of our legends' deeds for generations to come.

Initially, some of the board of directors who took on the role of developing the Ontario Sports Hall of Fame, were Dr. Al Fruman, Marcia Vandenbosch, the late Mark Dailey, George McConnachie, Nao Seco, John Brossard, Ian Smith and others were added later. As the "Hall" began to grow in prominence and stature, the inaugural induction event, in 1995, was held in Toronto's Metro Convention Centre, with Paul Godfrey as honorary chairman; 1996 with Bruce Simmons as honorary chairman in the Pickering Recreation Centre; and 1997 saw the event return to the Convention Centre in Toronto, with Richard Peddie the honorary chairman.

Since 2015, the Syl Apps Athlete of the Year Award has been determined by the people of Ontario who vote in an online poll with pre-selected athletes. A write-in option is available for athletes who are not on the ballot. To be eligible for the award, athletes must be Ontario-born or Ontario-based and made an outstanding and memorable contribution to Ontario sports during the previous calendar year.

== 2017 Induction Ceremony & Awards Gala ==
The Class of 2017 were honoured at the 2017 Induction Ceremony & Awards Gala in Toronto at The Westin Harbour Castle (Metropolitan Ballroom) on October 2, 2017. The 2017 Ontario Sports Hall of Fame inductees included Paul Coffey, John Campbell, Bob Allan, Marnie McBean, Bob Gainey, and John Hiller.

== Brian Williams Media Award ==
The Brian Williams Media Award is presented annually by the Ontario Sports Hall of Fame to a person in the Ontario sports media who has distinguished themselves in their life's work, and career.

Year	Winner
2012	Dave Hodge
2013	Ralph Mellanby
2014	Tom Cheek
2015	Roy MacGregor
2016	Bob Elliott
2017	Howard Starkman
2018	Harnarayan Singh
2019	Jerry Howarth
2020	Gordon Craig
2023	Joe Bowen
2024	Rosie DiManno
2025	Scott Russell
2026	Bob McKenzie

== Ferguson Jenkins Heritage Award ==
The Ferguson Jenkins Heritage Award, presented annually by the Ontario Sports Hall of Fame, was introduced in 2011 to commemorate those one-of-a-kind events or special moments in time that so embellish the long history of sports in Ontario. The first recipient was Terry Fox, who, back in 1980, passed through Ontario on his heart-lifting Marathon of Hope.

Year	Winner	Sport
2011	Terry Fox	Distance Runner
2012	Paul Henderson	Hockey
2013	Arnold Palmer	Golf
2014	Babe Ruth's first professional home run	Baseball
2015	Joe Carter's home run wins the 1993 World Series	Baseball
2016	Toronto Varsity Blues football team winning the first Grey Cup in 1909	Football
2017	No Award Recipient Selected	

== Sandy Hawley Community Service Award ==
The Sandy Hawley Community Service Award, presented annually by the Ontario Sports Hall of Fame, is given to an individual who best exemplifies a dedication to the community. The award is named after Sandy Hawley, one of the most successful jockeys in history.

Year	Winner
2010	Mort Greenberg
2011	Adriano Belli
2012	Darryl Sittler
2013	Dave Perkins
2014	Michael Burgess
2015	Zeke O'Connor
2016	Peter Gilgan
2017	Trish Stratus
2018	Hazel McCallion
2019	Western Ontario Athletic Association
2020	RBC Canadian Open
2023	Steve Ludzik
2024	Nav Bhatia
2025	Howie Birnie
2026	Jays Care Foundation

== Bruce Prentice Legacy Award ==
The Bruce Prentice Legacy Award, unveiled in 2015, is named in honour of Bruce Prentice. who founded the Ontario Sports Hall of Fame and has served as its chairman for several years. The Bruce Prentice Legacy Award is presented to an individual or group that has demonstrated remarkable, long term contribution to sport in Ontario and the people involved. The Award may or may not be given out annually. Voting for this award is conducted by the Hall's Board members and a selected group of experienced sports media professionals.

Year	Winner	Sport
2015	Tim Horton	Hockey
2016	Frank J. Selke and Frank Selke Jr.	Hockey
2017	The Queen's Plate	Thoroughbred horse racing
2018	The Conacher Family	Hockey
2019	Dr. Frank Hayden	Special Olympics
2020	Jack Dominico	Baseball
2023	Charles Tator	
2024	Stacey Allaster	
2025	Larry Tanenbau	
2026	Brenda Andress	
