= Figure skating at the 2014 Winter Olympics =

Figure skating at the XXII Olympic Winter Games
- Venue: Iceberg Skating Palace; Sochi, Russia
- Dates: 6–22 February 2014
- No. of events: 5
- Competitors: 149 (75 men, 74 women) from 30 nations

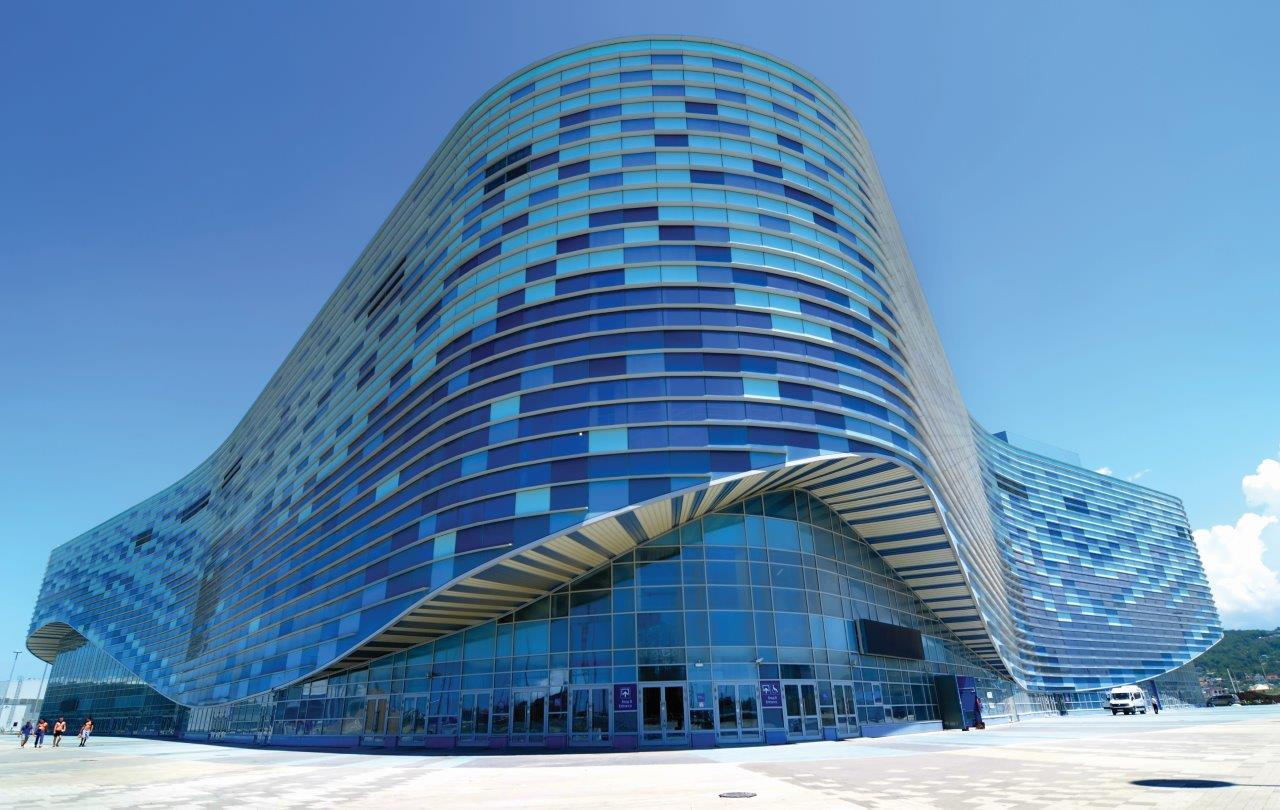
All of the figure skating events at the 2014 Winter Olympics were held at the Iceberg Skating Palace in Sochi, Russia.

The figure skating events at the 2014 Winter Olympics took place from 6 to 22 February 2014 at the Iceberg Skating Palace in Sochi, Russia, and featured 149 skaters from 30 nations. Medals were awarded in men's singles, women's singles, pair skating, ice dance, and the team event. The team event was a new addition to the Olympic Games this season. Yuzuru Hanyu of Japan won the men's event; Adelina Sotnikova of Russia won the women's event; Tatiana Volosozhar and Maxim Trankov of Russia won the pairs event; Meryl Davis and Charlie White of the United States won the ice dance event; and the team from Russia won the team event.

Several world record scores in figure skating were set at the Olympics, including by Hanyu in the men's event; Volosozhar and Trankov in the pairs event; and Davis and White in the ice dance event. The decision of the Figure Skating Federation of Russia to select Evgeni Plushenko as Russia's lone entrant in the men's event, given his age and history of surgeries, prompted criticism from many Russians after Plushenko withdrew from the event at the last possible moment. Controversy also arose upon completion of the women's event when an examination of the scores led to accusations of judging irregularities and improprieties. Ultimately, the history of the 2014 Winter Olympics was overshadowed by the revelation that Russia had been running a state-sponsored doping program for years, including through February 2014, when Russia hosted the Olympics.

== Background ==
A total of five figure skating events were contested: men's singles, women's singles, pair skating, ice dance, and the team event. All events were held from 9 to 23 February 2014 at the Iceberg Skating Palace in Sochi, Russia. The team event made its debut as an Olympic event this season. It combined the four Olympic figure skating disciplines (men's singles, women's singles, pair skating, and ice dance) into a single event; skaters earned points based on their placement in each discipline, and the gold medals were awarded to the team that earned the most placement points.

== Qualification ==
A total of 148 quota spots were available to athletes to compete in figure skating at the 2014 Winter Olympics. Each National Olympic Committee (NOC) was allowed to enter a maximum of 18 skaters, with a maximum of nine men or nine women. The results of the 2013 World Figure Skating Championships determined 83 total spots: 24 entries each in men's singles, women's singles, 16 in pair skating, and 19 in ice dance. The remaining quota spots were allocated based on the results of the 2013 Nebelhorn Trophy.

Number of qualified skaters or teams per nation
Nations	Men's singles	Women's singles	Pairs	Ice dance	Team event	Add.	Skater(s)
Australia	1	1	0	1			4
Austria	1	1	1	0			4
Azerbaijan	0	0	0	1			2
Belgium	1	0	0	0			1
Brazil	0	1	0	0			1
Canada	3	2	3	3	Yes		17
China	1	2	2	1	Yes		9
Czech Republic	2	1	0	0			3
Estonia	1	1	0	0			2
France	2	1	1	2	Yes		9
Georgia	0	1	0	0			1
Germany	1	1	2	2	Yes		10
Great Britain	0	1	1	1	Yes	1 (Note: Matthew Parr of Great Britain competed in the team event, but not the men's individual event.)	6
Israel	1	0	1	0			3
Italy	1	2	2	2	Yes		11
Japan	3	3	1	1	Yes		10
Kazakhstan	2	0	0	0			2
Lithuania	0	0	0	1			2
Norway	0	1	0	0			1
Philippines	1	0	0	0			1
Romania	1	0	0	0			1
Russia	1	2	3	3	Yes		15
Slovakia	0	1	0	0			1
South Korea	0	3	0	0			3
Spain	2	0	0	1			4
Sweden	1	1	0	0			2
Turkey	0	0	0	1			2
Ukraine	1	1	1	1	Yes		6
United States	2	3	2	3	Yes		15
Uzbekistan	1	0	0	0			1
Total: 30 NOCs	30	30	20 teams	24 teams	10 teams	1	149

=== Team event ===
For the team event, scores from the 2013 World Championships and the 2013–14 Grand Prix of Figure Skating season were tabulated to establish the top ten nations.

Qualification for figure skating team event
Pl.	Nation	M	W	P	D	Total
1	Canada	Yes	Yes	Yes	Yes	6053
2	Russia	Yes	Yes	Yes	Yes	5459
3	United States	Yes	Yes	Yes	Yes	5274
4	Japan	Yes	Yes	(Note: Japan did not originally qualify a pairs team for the 2014 Winter Olympics. However, when Estonia relinquished their quota spot, it was re-allocated to Japan, so Japan did not need to use an "Additional Athlete Quota" to complete their team.)	Yes	4062
5	Italy	Yes	Yes	Yes	Yes	3707
6	France	Yes	Yes	Yes	Yes	3626
7	China	Yes	Yes	Yes	Yes	3609
8	Germany	Yes	Yes	Yes	Yes	3596
9	Ukraine	Yes	Yes	Yes	Yes	1528
10	Great Britain		Yes	Yes	Yes	1261

== Entries ==
A total of five figure skating events were contested: men's singles, women's singles, pair skating, ice dance, and the team event. All events were held from 6 to 22 February 2014 at the Iceberg Skating Palace in Sochi, Russia. Skaters or teams denoted with ● were eligible for the team event only.

With seventeen skaters, Canada sported the largest contingent of figure skaters at the 2014 Winter Olympics. Two countries were represented in figure skating for the first time at the 2018 Winter Olympics. Isadora Williams was the first Brazilian skater to qualify for the Winter Olympics, as was Michael Christian Martinez the first skater from the Philippines.

Entries
Nation	Men	Women	Pairs	Ice dance	Ref.
Australia	Brendan Kerry	Brooklee Han	—N/a	Danielle O'Brien; Gregory Merriman	
Austria	Viktor Pfeifer	Kerstin Frank	Miriam Ziegler; Severin Kiefer	—N/a	
Azerbaijan	—N/a			Julia Zlobina; Alexei Sitnikov	
Belgium	Jorik Hendrickx	—N/a			
Brazil	—N/a	Isadora Williams	—N/a		
Canada	Patrick Chan	Gabrielle Daleman	Meagan Duhamel; Eric Radford	Alexandra Paul; Mitchell Islam	
Canada	Liam Firus	Kaetlyn Osmond	Paige Lawrence; Rudi Swiegers	Tessa Virtue; Scott Moir	
Canada	Kevin Reynolds	—N/a	Kirsten Moore-Towers; Dylan Moscovitch	Kaitlyn Weaver; Andrew Poje	
China	Yan Han	Li Zijun	Pang Qing; Tong Jian	Huang Xintong; Zheng Xun	
China	—N/a	Zhang Kexin	Zhang Hao; Peng Cheng	—N/a	
Czech Republic	Michal Březina	Elizaveta Ukolova	—N/a		
Czech Republic	Tomáš Verner	—N/a	—N/a		
Estonia	Viktor Romanenkov	Jelena Glebova	—N/a		
France	Florent Amodio	Maé-Bérénice Méité	Vanessa James; Morgan Ciprès	Pernelle Carron; Lloyd Jones	
France	Brian Joubert	—N/a		Nathalie Péchalat; Fabian Bourzat	
Georgia	—N/a	Elene Gedevanishvili	—N/a		
Germany	Peter Liebers	Nathalie Weinzierl	Aljona Savchenko; Robin Szolkowy	Tanja Kolbe; Stefano Caruso	
Germany	—N/a		Maylin Wende; Daniel Wende	Nelli Zhiganshina; Alexander Gazsi	
Great Britain	Matthew Parr ●	Jenna McCorkell	Stacey Kemp; David King	Nick Buckland; Penny Coomes	
Israel	Alexei Bychenko	—N/a	Andrea Davidovich; Evgeni Krasnopolski	—N/a	
Italy	Paul Bonifacio Parkinson	Carolina Kostner	Stefania Berton; Ondřej Hotárek	Anna Cappellini; Luca Lanotte	
Italy	—N/a	Valentina Marchei	Nicole Della Monica; Matteo Guarise	Charlène Guignard; Marco Fabbri	
Japan	Yuzuru Hanyu	Mao Asada	Narumi Takahashi; Ryuichi Kihara	Cathy Reed; Chris Reed	
Japan	Tatsuki Machida	Kanako Murakami	—N/a		
Japan	Daisuke Takahashi	Akiko Suzuki	—N/a		
Kazakhstan	Abzal Rakimgaliev	—N/a			
Kazakhstan	Denis Ten	—N/a			
Lithuania	—N/a			Isabella Tobias; Deividas Stagniūnas	
Norway	—N/a	Anne Line Gjersem	—N/a		
Philippines	Michael Christian Martinez	—N/a			
Romania	Zoltán Kelemen	—N/a			
Russia	Evgeni Plushenko	Yulia Lipnitskaya	Vera Bazarova; Yuri Larionov	Elena Ilinykh; Nikita Katsalapov	
Russia	—N/a	Adelina Sotnikova	Ksenia Stolbova; Fedor Klimov	Victoria Sinitsina; Ruslan Zhiganshin	
Russia	—N/a	—N/a	Tatiana Volosozhar; Maxim Trankov	Dmitri Soloviev; Ekaterina Bobrova	
Slovakia	—N/a	Nicole Rajičová	—N/a		
South Korea	—N/a	Kim Hae-jin	—N/a		
South Korea	—N/a	Yuna Kim	—N/a		
South Korea	—N/a	Park So-youn	—N/a		
Spain	Javier Fernández	—N/a		Sara Hurtado; Adrià Díaz	
Spain	Javier Raya	—N/a		—N/a	
Sweden	Alexander Majorov	Viktoria Helgesson	—N/a		
Turkey	—N/a			Alisa Agafonova; Alper Uçar	
Ukraine	Yakov Godorozha	Natalia Popova	Julia Lavrentieva; Yuri Rudyk	Siobhan Heekin-Canedy; Dmitri Dun	
United States	Jeremy Abbott	Polina Edmunds	Marissa Castelli; Simon Shnapir	Madison Chock; Evan Bates	
United States	Jason Brown	Gracie Gold	Felicia Zhang; Nathan Bartholomay	Meryl Davis; Charlie White	
United States	—N/a	Ashley Wagner	—N/a	Maia Shibutani; Alex Shibutani	
Uzbekistan	Misha Ge	—N/a			

== Competition schedule ==
Figure skating events schedule
Date	Time	Event
6 February	19:30	Team event (men's short program)
6 February	19:30	Team event (pairs short program)
8 February	18:30	Team event (short dance)
8 February	18:30	Team event (women's short program)
8 February	18:30	Team event (pairs free skating)
9 February	19:00	Team event (men's free skating)
9 February	19:00	Team event (women's free skating)
9 February	19:00	Team event (free dance)
11 February	19:00	Pairs short program
12 February	19:45	Pairs free skating
13 February	19:00	Men's short program
14 February	19:00	Men's free skating
16 February	19:00	Short dance
17 February	19:00	Free dance
19 February	19:00	Women's short program
20 February	19:00	Women's free skating
22 February	20:30	Gala exhibition

== Medal summary ==
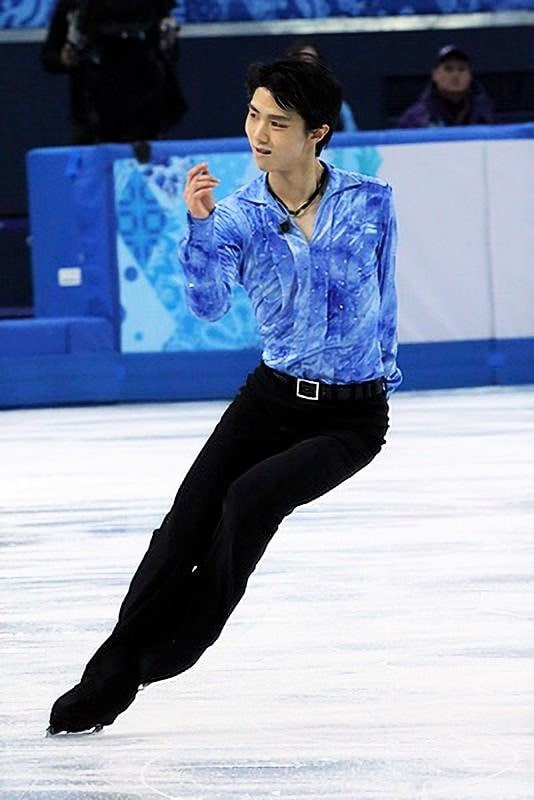
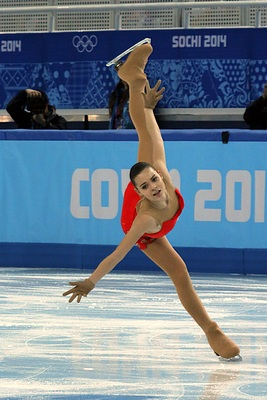
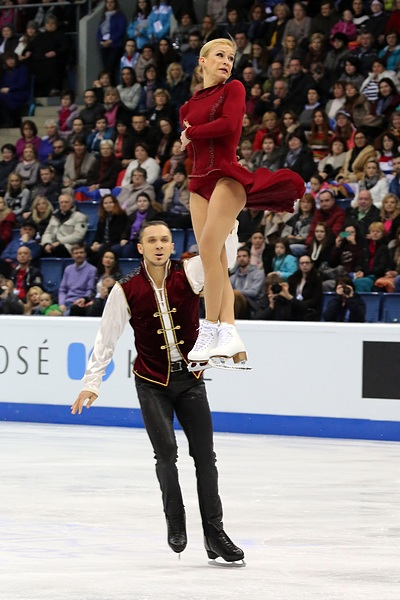
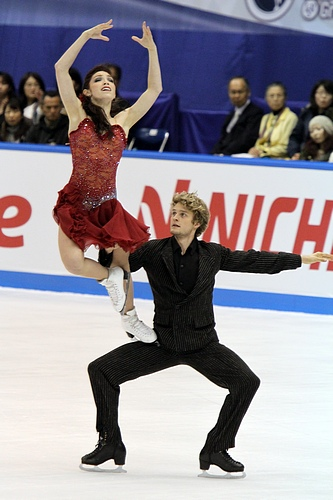
The 2014 Olympic figure skating champions (from left to right):
Yuzuru Hanyu of Japan (men's singles); Adelina Sotnikova of Russia (women's singles); Tatiana Volosozhar and Maxim Trankov of Russia (pair skating); and Meryl Davis and Charlie White of the United States (ice dance)

=== Medalists ===
Olympic medalists
Discipline	Gold	Silver	Bronze	Ref.
Men's singles	Yuzuru Hanyu; Japan	Patrick Chan; Canada	Denis Ten; Kazakhstan	
Women's singles	Adelina Sotnikova; Russia	Kim Yuna; South Korea	Carolina Kostner; Italy	
Pairs	Tatiana Volosozhar; Maxim Trankov; Russia	Ksenia Stolbova; Fedor Klimov; Russia	Aljona Savchenko; Robin Szolkowy; Germany	
Ice dance	Meryl Davis; Charlie White; United States	Tessa Virtue; Scott Moir; Canada	Elena Ilinykh; Nikita Katsalapov; Russia	
Team event	Russia; Evgeni Plushenko; Yulia Lipnitskaya; Tatiana Volosozhar; Maxim Trankov; Ksenia Stolbova; Fedor Klimov; Ekaterina Bobrova; Dmitri Soloviev; Elena Ilinykh; Nikita Katsalapov	Canada; Patrick Chan; Kevin Reynolds; Kaetlyn Osmond; Meagan Duhamel; Eric Radford; Kirsten Moore-Towers; Dylan Moscovitch; Tessa Virtue; Scott Moir	United States; Jeremy Abbott; Jason Brown; Ashley Wagner; Gracie Gold; Marissa Castelli; Simon Shnapir; Meryl Davis; Charlie White	

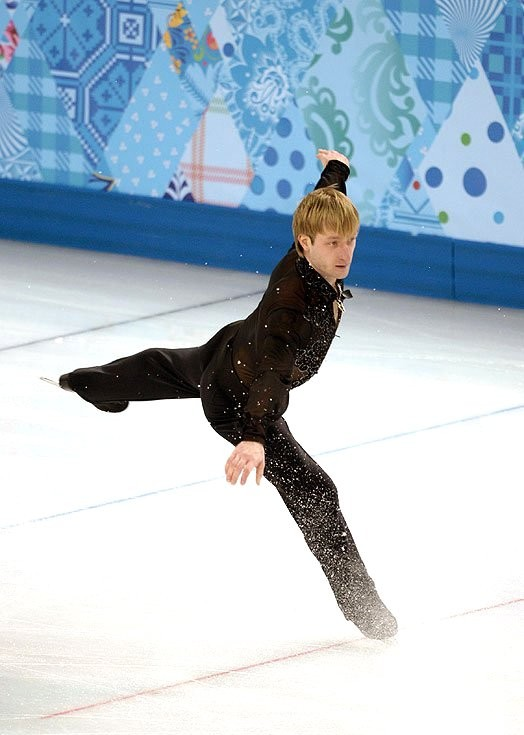
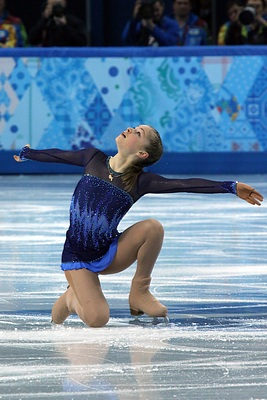
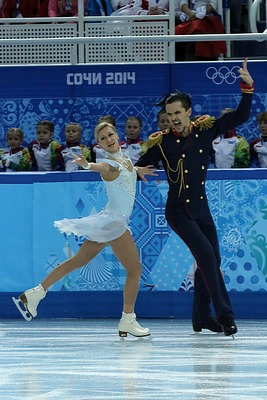
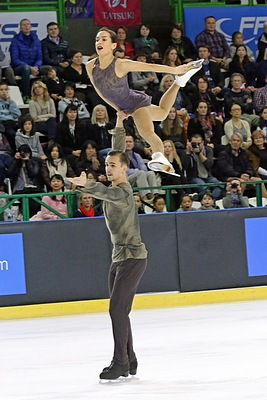
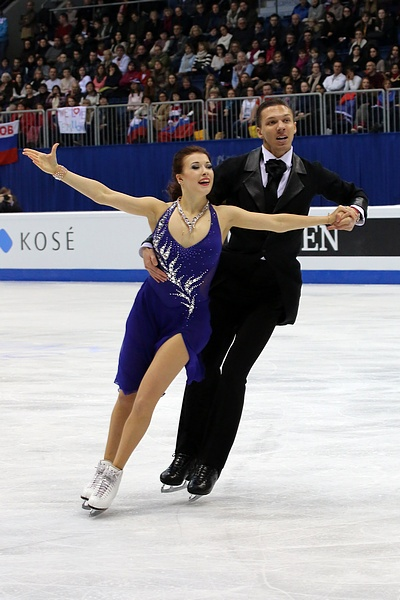
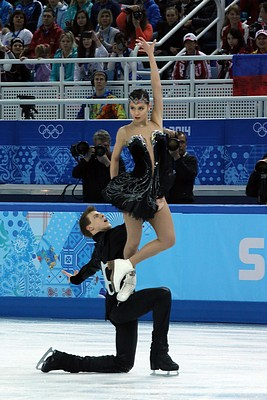
The Russian figure skating team and gold medalists from the 2014 Winter Olympics (from left to right):
Evgeni Plushenko; Yuliya Lipnitskaya; Tatiana Volosozhar and Maxim Trankov; Ksenia Stolbova and Fedor Klimov; Ekaterina Bobrova and Dmitri Soloviev; and Elena Ilinykh and Nikita Katsalapov

=== Medal table ===
Rank	Nation	Gold	Silver	Bronze	Total
1	Russia	3	1	1	5
2	United States	1	0	1	2
3	Japan	1	0	0	1
4	Canada	0	3	0	3
5	South Korea	0	1	0	1
6	Germany	0	0	1	1
6	Italy	0	0	1	1
6	Kazakhstan	0	0	1	1
Totals (8 entries)		5	5	5	15

== Records ==
The following new record high scores were set during this competition.

Record high scores
Date	Skater(s)	Event	Segment	Score	Ref.
9 February	(United States); Meryl Davis; Charlie White	Team event (Ice dance)	Free dance	114.34	
11 February	(Russia); Tatiana Volosozhar; Maxim Trankov	Pair skating	Short program	84.17	
13 February	(Japan) Yuzuru Hanyu	Men's singles	Short program	101.45	
16 February	(United States); Meryl Davis; Charlie White	Ice dance	Short dance	78.89	
17 February	(Canada); Tessa Virtue; Scott Moir	Ice dance	Free dance	114.66	
17 February	(United States); Meryl Davis; Charlie White	Ice dance	Free dance	116.63	
17 February	(United States); Meryl Davis; Charlie White	Ice dance	Total score	195.52	

== Controversies ==
=== Selection of Evgeni Plushenko ===
The decision to select Evgeni Plushenko for the Olympic team was seen as controversial by many in Russia, especially as he had lost the 2014 Russian Figure Skating Championships to Maxim Kovtun. Russia only qualified one man to the 2014 Winter Olympics and could not submit one skater to compete in the team event and another in the men's individual event. During the 2014 European Figure Skating Championships, Ottavio Cinquanta, then-president of the International Skating Union, advised, "If one of your skaters has sustained the same injury for years, you should not enter him." Plushenko did not compete at the 2014 European Championships. Plushenko was ultimately chosen for the Olympic team after skating for members of the selection committee behind closed doors. He skated successfully during the short program of the team event, finishing second behind Yuzuru Hanyu. During the free skate, he performed only one quadruple jump and reported having back pain. On 10 February, Aleksandr Gorshkov, then-president of the Figure Skating Federation of Russia (FSFR), said that Plushenko would compete in the individual event. However, Plushenko withdrew from the short program minutes before he was set to compete. Considering his age (31) and history of back pain and multiple surgeries, many Russians asked why Plushenko had been chosen for Russia's sole quota spot in the first place. Despite the fact that Maxim Kovtun had won the 2014 Russian Championships, which, according to the FSFR's own rules, should have earned him a spot at the Olympics, the selection committee considered his competitive history too inexperienced and erratic, and opted to send Plushenko instead.

=== Women's event results ===
The gold-medal victory of Adelina Sotnikova of Russia over Yuna Kim of South Korea in the women's event prompted an outpouring of criticism and allegations of unfair judging. Journalists and skating experts argued that scores given to Sotnikova were inflated both in the short program and free skate. Sotnikova also received criticism for her choreography and artistry, which many found lacking compared to that of Yuna Kim, as well as Carolina Kostner, the skater from Italy who won the bronze medal.

Christine Brennan of USA Today reported that an unnamed Olympic figure skating official alleged that "the geographic makeup of the judging panel 'was clearly slanted towards… Sotnikova'." The panel of nine judges included four judges from former Eastern Bloc nations (Russia, Ukraine, Estonia, and Slovakia), plus one judge from France, which had earlier conspired with Russia to fix the results of the pair skating event at the 2002 Winter Olympics. Yuri Balkov, the Ukrainian judge, had already served a one-year suspension after he was caught on tape trying to rig the outcome of the ice dance event at the 1998 Winter Olympics, while the Russian judge, Alla Shekhovtsova, was the wife of Valentin Piseev, then-general director of the Figure Skating Federation of Russia (FSFR). In addition, the technical panel, which is tasked with identifying all of the elements performed as they happen in real time, as well as flagging technical errors and the levels of difficulty performed in different elements, was led by Alexander Lakernik, then-vice president of the FSFR. In the wake of the judging scandal at the 2002 Winter Olympics, the International Skating Union (ISU) adopted a new system of judging, whereby judges' scores were now posted anonymously, ostensibly to relieve judges from pressures from their federations and other outside influences like those which had corrupted the 2002 pairs' event. However, the result was now that judges' scores could not be scrutinized for malfeasance. An examination of the score sheets for Sotnikova, Kim, and Kostner showed irregularities. At this point in time, the world record for the highest score in the women's free skate was 150.06, received by Kim at the 2010 Winter Olympics, where she won the gold medal. Sotnikova received a total score of 149.95 in her free skate at the 2014 Winter Olympics. Prior to this, the highest she had ever received for the same program was 131.63, which she had received at the 2014 European Championships roughly three weeks earlier. Even if Sotnikova had had the cleanest skate of her life, journalists and commentators could not see justification for a score increase of over 18 points.

On 21 February, the ISU issued a statement asserting that all rules and procedures had been correctly applied during the competition and that no official protest had been filed by any participating nation concerning the results. The ISU expressed confidence "in the high quality and integrity of the ISU Judging System" and added that "judges were selected by random drawing from a pool of thirteen potential judges" and that all nine judges on the free skating panel were from different nations.

On 10 April, the Korean Olympic Committee (KOC) and the Korea Skating Union (KSU) filed an official complaint with the ISU Disciplinary Commission (DC). The complaint addressed "the wrongful constitution of the panel of judges and the unjust outcome of the competition". It requested that the DC conduct a thorough investigation, "take appropriate disciplinary actions against the concerned individuals", and institute corrective actions. The DC ruled the complaint inadmissible, because a general request for investigation was not within the DC's jurisdiction and the complaint was not addressed to an individual or federation as required. On 30 April, the KOC and KSU filed a second official complaint with the DC, this time against Alla Shekhovtsova and the FSFR, specifically citing photographs of Sotnikova hugging Shekhovtsova which emerged shortly after the end of the women's competition, as well as Shekhovtsova's marriage to the then-general director of the FSFR. On 30 May, the DC dismissed the complaint, ruling that Shekhovtsova was "not responsible for the judging panel's composition", her marriage did not create a conflict of interest, and since Sotnikova was the one who initiated the hug, Shekhovtsova did not break any rules by responding.

=== Russia's state-sponsored doping scandal ===
In December 2014, the German public broadcaster ARD aired a documentary alleging that Russia had organized a state-sponsored doping program which supplied their athletes with performance-enhancing substances. In May 2016, The New York Times reported on allegations made by the former director of Russia's anti-doping laboratory, Grigory Rodchenkov, that a conspiracy of corrupt anti-doping officials, intelligence agents of the Federal Security Service, and compliant Russian athletes used performance-enhancing drugs to gain an unfair advantage during the 2014 Winter Olympics. An independent report commissioned by the World Anti-Doping Agency later confirmed allegations that the Russian Olympic team had been involved in a state-sponsored doping from at least late 2011 through February 2014, when Russia hosted the Winter Olympics. Rodchenkov stated that the FSB tampered with over 100 urine samples during the Olympics and that at least fifteen of the Russian medals won at Sochi were a result of doping.

== Aftermath ==
The ISU Congress, the highest-ranking body of the International Skating Union, ended the policy of secret judging after the 2014 Winter Olympics. While the ISU stated that the secrecy provided when judges' marks were posted anonymously freed judges from pressure from their federations, critics responded that instead of preventing judges from cheating, the secrecy prevented the public and media from being able to identify cheating. The ISU explained that the change was to "increase transparency" in the process.

On 5 December 2017, the International Olympic Committee announced that the Russian Olympic Committee had been suspended from the 2018 Winter Olympics. Athletes with no previous drug violations and a consistent history of drug testing were allowed to compete under the Olympic flag as an "Olympic Athlete from Russia". Under the terms of the decree, neither the Russian flag nor anthem would be allowed at the Olympics; the Olympic flag and Olympic Anthem were used instead.

== Works cited ==
- "Qualification System for XXII Olympic Winter Games, Sochi 2014" (PDF). International Skating Union. September 2012. Archived from the original (PDF) on 28 April 2013.
