= Figure skating at the 2014 Winter Olympics – Men's singles =

Men's singles at the XXII Olympic Winter Games
- Venue: Iceberg Skating Palace; Sochi, Russia
- Dates: 13–14 February 2014
- Competitors: 29 from 20 nations
- Winning score: 280.09 points

Medalists
1st place, gold medalist(s)		Yuzuru Hanyu	Japan
2nd place, silver medalist(s)		Patrick Chan	Canada
3rd place, bronze medalist(s)		Denis Ten	Kazakhstan

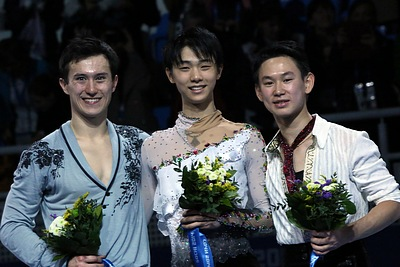
The medalists from the men's event at the 2014 Winter Olympics (from left to right): Patrick Chan of Canada (silver), Yuzuru Hanyu of Japan (gold), and Denis Ten of Kazakhstan (bronze)

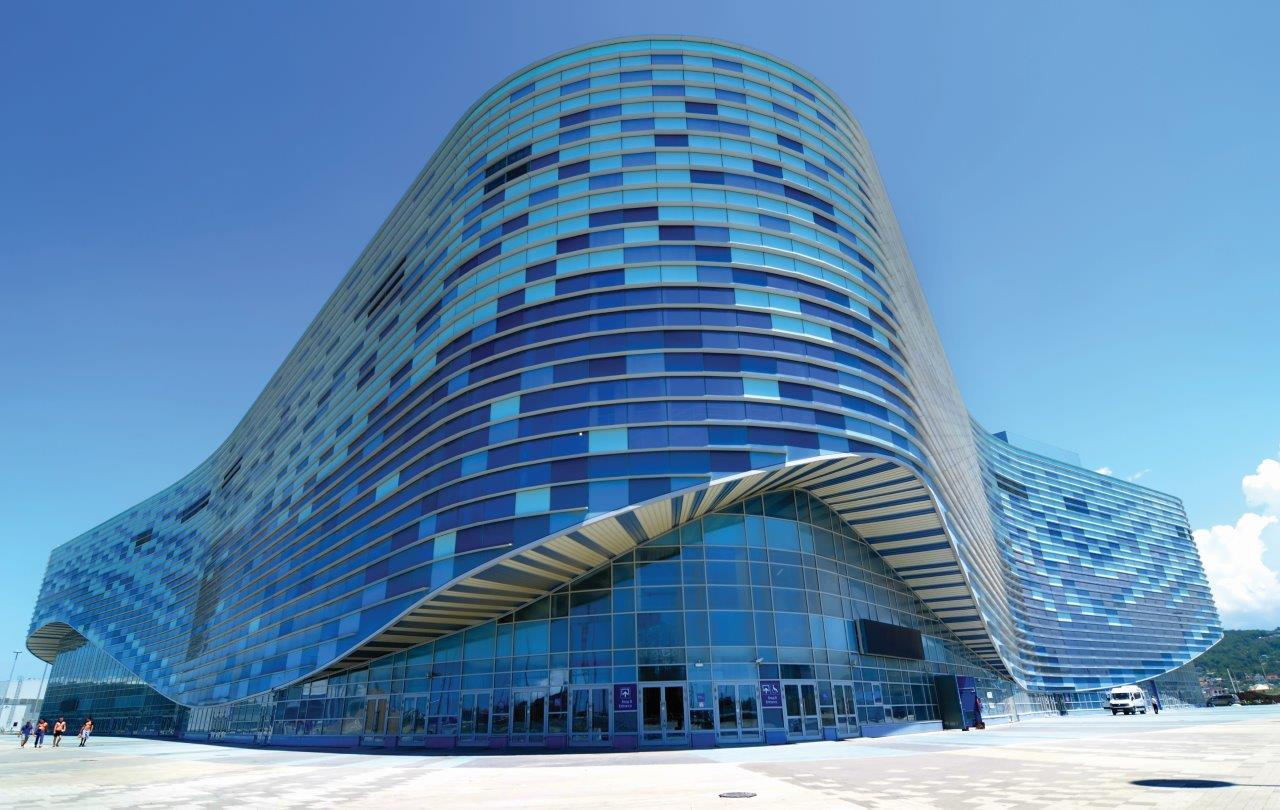
The figure skating events at the 2014 Winter Olympics were held at the Iceberg Skating Palace in Sochi, Russia.

The men's singles figure skating competition at the 2014 Winter Olympics was held on 13 and 14 February 2014 at the Iceberg Skating Palace in Sochi, Russia, and featured 29 skaters from 20 nations. Yuzuru Hanyu of Japan won the gold medal, Patrick Chan of Canada won the silver medal, and Denis Ten of Kazakhstan won the bronze medal. In addition to his gold medal, Hanyu became the first skater to surpass the 100-point threshold in the short program, setting a new world record score in the process. This was the first time that a Japanese skater had won the gold medal in the men's individual event and was also the first Olympic medal in figure skating for a skater from Kazakhstan. The decision of the Figure Skating Federation of Russia to select Evgeni Plushenko as Russia's lone entrant in the men's event, given his age and history of surgeries, prompted criticism from many Russians after Plushenko withdrew from the event at the last possible moment.

== Background ==
The men's single skating event was one of five figure skating competitions contested at the 2014 Winter Olympics in Sochi, Russia. It was held at the Iceberg Skating Palace over two days: the short program took place on 13 February and the free skating on 14 February. The competition featured 29 skaters representing 20 nations. Among the contenders seen as favorites for an Olympic medal were Patrick Chan of Canada, Javier Fernández of Spain, and Yuzuru Hanyu of Japan. Chan was a three-time world champion, two-time Four Continents champion, and seven-time Canadian national champion. Fernández was a two-time European champion, the 2013 World Championship bronze medalist, and a four-time Spanish national champion. Hanyu had won the bronze medal at the 2012 World Championships, two silver medals at the Four Continents Championships (2011, 2013), and was a two-time Japanese national champion.

Evgeni Plushenko, who had been part of the Russian team that had earlier won the team event, was Russia's lone entrant in the men's event. Considered one of Russia's most famous athletes at the 2014 Winter Olympics, Plushenko had won the gold medal at the 2006 Winter Olympics, silver medals in 2002 and 2010, and was a three-time world champion, seven-time European champion, and ten-time Russian national champion. However, he had only competed sporadically since 2010 and undergone a number of surgeries on his knees and back.

The decision to select Plushenko for the Olympic team was seen as controversial by many in Russia, especially as he had lost the 2014 Russian Figure Skating Championships to Maxim Kovtun. Russia only qualified one man to the Winter Olympics and could not submit one skater to compete in the team event and another in the men's individual event. During the 2014 European Figure Skating Championships, Ottavio Cinquanta, then-president of the International Skating Union, stated, "If one of your skaters has sustained the same injury for years, you should not enter him." Plushenko did not compete at the 2014 European Championships and had only competed at one international event that season: the 2013 Volvo Open Cup in Latvia. Questions about swapping in a replacement skater during the Olympics yielded complicated answers. If Plushenko were submitted as Russia's entrant to the Olympics and withdrew after the short program during the team event, Russia would not have been able to substitute another skater. However, if Plushenko were to withdraw for medical reasons after the team event, but before the men's individual event, the Russian Olympic Committee could have theoretically petitioned the International Olympic Committee (IOC) to name a replacement, per the IOC's Late Athlete Replacement Policy. Plushenko was ultimately chosen for the Olympic team after skating for members of the selection committee behind closed doors.

== Qualification ==
Twenty-four quota spots in the men's event were awarded based on the results at the 2013 World Figure Skating Championships. An additional six quota spots were earned at the 2013 Nebelhorn Trophy. This was the first time that the Philippines had ever qualified for a figure skating event at the Winter Olympics. Michael Christian Martinez was the only Filipino athlete sent to Sochi and served as the country's flag bearer.

Qualifying nations in men's singles
Event	Skaters per NOC	Qualifying NOCs	Total skaters
2013 World Championships	3	Canada; Japan	24
2013 World Championships	2	Kazakhstan; Spain; United States; France; Czech Republic	24
2013 World Championships	1	Germany; China; Uzbekistan; Russia; Sweden; Belgium; Austria; Estonia	24
2013 Nebelhorn Trophy	1	Israel; Romania; Philippines; Australia; Ukraine; Italy	6
Total			30

== Required performance elements ==
Men performed their short programs on 13 February. Lasting 2 minutes 50 seconds, the short program had to include the following elements: one double or triple Axel; one triple or quadruple jump immediately preceded by connecting steps; one jump combination consisting of a double jump and a triple jump, two triple jumps, or a quadruple jump and a double or triple jump; one flying spin; one camel spin or sit spin with a change of foot; one spin combination with a change of foot; and a step sequence using the full ice surface.

The twenty-four highest scoring skaters after the short program advanced to the free skating, which they performed on 14 February. The free skate had to last 4 minutes 30 seconds (+/− 10 seconds), and had to include the following elements: eight jump elements, of which one had to be an Axel-type jump; three spins, of which one had to be a spin combination, one a flying spin, and one a spin with only one position; a step sequence; and a choreographic sequence.

== Judging ==
Skaters were judged according to the required technical elements of their program (such as jumps and spins), as well as the overall presentation of their program, based on five program components (skating skills, transitions, performance/execution, composition/choreography, and musical interpretation). Each technical element in a figure skating performance was assigned a predetermined base point value and scored by a panel of nine judges on a scale from −3 to +3 based on the quality of its execution. Each Grade of Execution (GOE) from –3 to +3 was assigned a value as indicated on the Scale of Values. For example, a triple Axel was worth a base value of 8.50 points, and a GOE of +3 was worth 3.00 points, so a triple Axel with a GOE of +3 earned 11.50 points. The judging panel's GOE for each element was determined by calculating the trimmed mean (the average after discarding the highest and lowest scores). The panel's scores for all elements were added together to generate a Total Elements Score. At the same time, the judges evaluated each performance based on the five aforementioned program components and assigned each a score from 0.25 to 10 in 0.25-point increments. The judging panel's final score for each program component was also determined by calculating the trimmed mean. Those scores were then multiplied by the factor shown on the chart below; the results were added together to generate a total Program Component Score.

Program component factoring
Component	Short program	Free skating
Men's singles	1.00	2.00

Deductions were applied for certain violations, such as time infractions or falls. The Total Elements Score and Program Component Score were then added together, minus any deductions, to generate a final performance score for each skater or team.

== Results ==
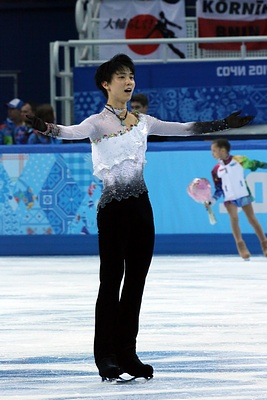
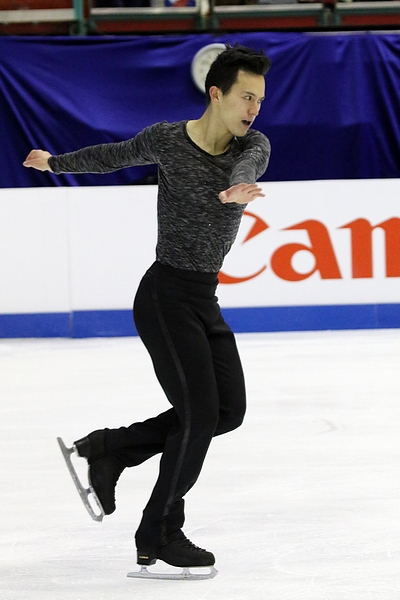
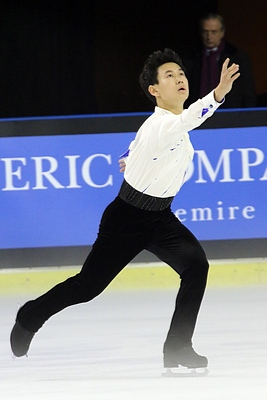
The gold, silver, and bronze medalists from the men's event at the 2014 Winter Olympics (from left to right):
Yuzuru Hanyu of Japan (gold), Patrick Chan of Canada (silver), and Denis Ten of Kazakhstan (bronze)

Code key

- TSS – Total Segment Score
- TES – Total Elements Score
- PCS – Program Component Score
- SS – Skating skills
- TR – Transitions
- PE – Performance
- CH – Choreography/Composition
- IN – Musical interpretation
- DED – Deductions

=== Short program ===
The men's short program was held on 13 February. Yuzuru Hanyu of Japan finished in first place, becoming the first skater to surpass the 100-point threshold in the short program. His score was a new world record, surpassing the previous world record score, which had been set by him at the 2013–14 Grand Prix of Figure Skating Final. Philip Hersh of the Chicago Tribune described Hanyu's routine as "a barrier-breaking performance so brilliant, it [would] be numbered among the greatest short programs ever". His performance – set to "Parisienne Walkways" by Gary Moore – included a quadruple toe loop and a triple Lutz-triple toe loop jump combination. Hanyu's score of 101.45 put him nearly four points ahead of Patrick Chan of Canada. Chan's short program was set to Elegie in E flat minor by Sergei Rachmaninoff and featured a quadruple toe loop-triple toe loop combination, triple Lutz, and triple Axel, though with a small error on the landing of the triple Axel. Javier Fernández of Spain finished in third place, while three other skaters trailed him by less than one point.

Evgeni Plushenko of Russia had skated successfully during the short program of the team event, finishing second behind Hanyu. During the free skate, he performed only one quadruple jump, and reported having back pain. On 10 February, Aleksandr Gorshkov, then-president of the Figure Skating Federation of Russia, said that Plushenko would compete in the men's individual event. Vitaly Mutko, then-director of the Russian Ministry of Sport, stated that Plushenko had been cleared by his coach (Alexei Mishin) and the team's doctors to compete. However, Plushenko withdrew from the competition after his name was called for him to begin his short program. He later explained that when he fell on a triple Axel during the warmup, it felt "like a knife in [his] back," and he decided he could not compete. Before exiting the rink, he skated to the center of the ice, patted his heart, and bowed to the audience. Plushenko, who had undergone twelve surgeries, including recently on his back, had attended practices inconsistently leading up to the competition and had reportedly fallen twice hard on the ice during practice the day before. When he left the rink, a number of spectators followed, leaving the arena one-third full by the end of the competition. Considering his age (31) and history of back pain and multiple surgeries, many Russians asked why Plushenko had been chosen for Russia's sole men's quota spot in the first place. Despite the fact that Maxim Kovtun had won the 2014 Russian Championships, which, according to the FSFR's own rules, should have earned him the spot at the Olympics, the selection committee considered his competitive history too inexperienced and erratic, and opted to send Plushenko instead.

Jeremy Abbott of the United States fell hard on the ice after attempting a quadruple toe loop, sliding into the boards, where he lay stunned for several seconds, grabbing at his hip in pain. He explained afterward that the cheers of the audience inspired him to get up and finish his performance. Abbott altered his planned routine to account for the lost time, and managed to complete all of the required elements and finish strong. He received a standing ovation from the audience and doubled over in pain as he exited the ice. He ultimately finished the short program in fifteenth place. "I'm not in the least bit ashamed," Abbott said afterward, "I ... finished that program and I'm proud of my effort and proud of what I did under the circumstance".

Men's short program results
Pl.	Skater	Nation	TSS	TES	PCS	SS	TR	PE	CH	IN	DED
1	Yuzuru Hanyu	Japan	101.45	54.84	46.61	9.36	9.00	9.50	9.39	9.36	0.00
2	Patrick Chan	Canada	97.52	50.34	47.18	9.43	9.32	9.32	9.54	9.57	0.00
3	Javier Fernández	Spain	86.98	43.87	43.11	8.54	8.39	8.61	8.75	8.82	0.00
4	Daisuke Takahashi	Japan	86.40	41.75	44.65	8.86	8.61	9.04	9.00	9.14	0.00
5	Peter Liebers	Germany	86.04	47.26	38.78	7.71	7.50	7.86	7.96	7.75	0.00
6	Jason Brown	United States	86.00	45.39	40.61	7.96	7.82	8.18	8.29	8.36	0.00
7	Brian Joubert	France	85.84	45.11	40.73	8.18	7.61	8.54	8.11	8.29	0.00
8	Yan Han	China	85.66	44.94	40.72	8.43	7.79	8.11	8.14	8.25	0.00
9	Denis Ten	Kazakhstan	84.06	43.49	41.57	8.46	7.93	8.36	8.39	8.43	1.00
10	Alexander Majorov	Sweden	83.81	45.52	38.29	7.75	7.32	7.79	7.61	7.82	0.00
11	Tatsuki Machida	Japan	83.48	40.98	42.50	8.57	8.32	8.43	8.54	8.64	0.00
12	Michal Březina	Czech Republic	81.95	42.20	39.75	8.18	7.64	8.00	8.00	7.93	0.00
13	Tomáš Verner	Czech Republic	81.09	42.11	39.98	8.04	7.68	8.04	8.04	8.18	1.00
14	Florent Amodio	France	75.58	35.79	39.79	8.00	7.57	8.11	7.93	8.18	0.00
15	Jeremy Abbott	United States	72.58	37.21	37.37	7.86	7.18	7.18	7.61	7.54	2.00
16	Jorik Hendrickx	Belgium	72.52	39.88	32.64	6.71	6.25	6.71	6.43	6.54	0.00
17	Kevin Reynolds	Canada	68.76	33.98	36.78	7.46	7.07	7.29	7.32	7.64	2.00
18	Misha Ge	Uzbekistan	68.07	35.64	32.43	6.18	6.18	6.64	6.54	6.89	0.00
19	Michael Christian Martinez	Philippines	64.81	33.31	31.50	6.21	6.04	6.46	6.36	6.43	0.00
20	Abzal Rakimgaliev	Kazakhstan	64.18	34.50	29.68	5.93	5.61	6.00	6.00	6.14	0.00
21	Yakov Godorozha	Ukraine	62.65	34.08	28.57	5.75	5.64	5.75	5.75	5.68	0.00
22	Alexei Bychenko	Israel	62.44	32.05	31.39	6.32	6.00	6.32	6.36	6.39	1.00
23	Viktor Romanenkov	Estonia	61.55	34.16	27.39	5.68	5.07	5.61	5.57	5.46	0.00
24	Zoltán Kelemen	Romania	60.41	30.40	30.01	6.25	5.68	6.00	6.04	6.04	0.00
25	Javier Raya	Spain	59.76	28.91	30.85	6.07	5.96	6.21	6.29	6.32	0.00
26	Viktor Pfeifer	Austria	56.60	25.23	31.37	6.43	6.04	6.29	6.32	6.29	0.00
27	Paul Bonifacio Parkinson	Italy	56.30	28.91	28.39	5.68	5.39	5.71	5.75	5.86	1.00
28	Liam Firus	Canada	55.04	27.47	29.57	6.18	5.75	5.75	5.89	6.00	2.00
29	Brendan Kerry	Australia	47.12	21.87	26.25	5.46	5.11	5.04	5.43	5.21	1.00
WD	Evgeni Plushenko	Russia	Withdrew from competition								

=== Free skating ===
The men's free skating was held on 14 February. Despite falling on his opening quadruple Salchow, Yuzuru Hanyu won the gold medal, becoming the first skater from Japan, and the first from Asia, to win an Olympic gold medal in men's figure skating. After finishing his program, Hanyu knelt on the ice, sure that he had blown his chance at the gold medal. The four-point lead that he had secured in the short program was enough to secure him the gold when his competitors made errors as well. Hanyu's victory came nearly three years after the 2011 Tōhoku earthquake and tsunami that struck his hometown of Sendai. He had been at practice when the earthquake struck; the pipes under the ice burst, flooding the rink and melting the ice. He and his family sheltered at an emergency center for four days before they could return to their home. At the post-competition press conference, Hanyu spoke about everyone in Sendai who had supported him, when an official from Japan informed him that even though it was 4:00am there, people in Sendai were celebrating his victory.

Patrick Chan finished in second place after he made a series of mistakes in what the Associated Press described as a "watered-down" program, while Denis Ten of Kazakhstan, who had been in ninth place after the short program, surged to third with a routine that featured three jump combinations. It was the first Olympic medal for a figure skater from Kazakhstan. Ten called his bronze medal a "gift to [his] country". Jeremy Abbott ultimately finished in twelfth place. He had woken up in pain after his fall on the ice during the short program, and was unable to do any loop jumps, so he swapped them out for other jumps, and eschewed the quadruple toe loop that had caused his fall. For Abbott, the four-time U.S. national champion who had already announced that he would retire at the end of the season, the clean performance offered a sense of redemption. When asked at a press conference for his response to being considered a choker – excelling in national competitions, but floundering internationally – Abbott responded bluntly. "I would just... put my middle fingers in the air and say a big 'F you' to everyone who's ever said that to me, because they've... never had to do what I had to do," he stated. "Nobody has to stand center ice in front of a million people and put an entire career on the line for eight minutes of their life ... If you think that's not hard, then you're a damn idiot."

Men's free skate results
Pl.	Skater	Nation	TSS	TES	PCS	SS	TR	PE	CH	IN	DED
1	Yuzuru Hanyu	Japan	178.64	89.66	90.98	9.07	8.96	8.89	9.21	9.36	2.00
2	Patrick Chan	Canada	178.10	85.40	92.70	9.39	9.25	8.93	9.39	9.39	0.00
3	Denis Ten	Kazakhstan	171.04	88.90	82.14	8.21	7.89	8.36	8.32	8.29	0.00
4	Tatsuki Machida	Japan	169.94	88.22	82.72	8.39	7.93	8.36	8.32	8.36	1.00
5	Javier Fernández	Spain	166.94	77.80	89.14	8.64	8.75	9.00	9.00	9.18	0.00
6	Daisuke Takahashi	Japan	164.27	73.27	91.00	9.11	8.82	9.04	9.14	9.39	0.00
7	Yan Han	China	160.54	80.60	79.94	8.54	7.75	8.04	7.89	7.75	0.00
8	Jeremy Abbott	United States	160.12	78.10	82.02	8.07	7.79	8.18	8.36	8.61	0.00
9	Peter Liebers	Germany	153.83	75.97	78.86	7.75	7.79	7.86	8.07	7.96	1.00
10	Kevin Reynolds	Canada	153.47	79.83	73.64	7.43	7.14	7.43	7.43	7.39	0.00
11	Jason Brown	United States	152.37	68.09	84.28	8.14	8.43	8.32	8.54	8.71	0.00
12	Tomáš Verner	Czech Republic	151.90	73.98	78.92	8.00	7.57	7.86	7.96	8.07	1.00
13	Michal Březina	Czech Republic	151.67	75.31	77.36	8.00	7.43	7.89	7.75	7.61	1.00
14	Brian Joubert	France	145.93	69.51	76.42	7.89	7.00	7.93	7.75	7.64	0.00
15	Jorik Hendrickx	Belgium	141.52	73.88	67.64	6.89	6.43	6.82	6.86	6.82	0.00
16	Alexander Majorov	Sweden	141.05	66.05	75.00	7.64	7.25	7.57	7.50	7.54	0.00
17	Misha Ge	Uzbekistan	135.19	69.63	65.56	6.39	6.07	6.82	6.43	7.07	0.00
18	Florent Amodio	France	123.06	49.00	74.06	7.61	6.96	7.46	7.32	7.68	0.00
19	Yakov Godorozha	Ukraine	119.54	65.12	54.42	5.57	5.14	5.54	5.50	5.46	0.00
20	Michael Christian Martinez	Philippines	119.44	62.58	57.86	5.93	5.68	5.79	5.71	5.82	1.00
21	Alexei Bychenko	Israel	114.62	59.96	55.66	5.93	5.25	5.61	5.61	5.43	1.00
22	Abzal Rakimgaliev	Kazakhstan	110.22	53.92	56.30	5.86	5.18	5.54	5.75	5.82	0.00
23	Zoltán Kelemen	Romania	98.35	50.27	51.08	5.54	4.79	4.89	5.25	5.07	3.00
24	Viktor Romanenkov	Estonia	78.44	32.42	48.02	5.32	4.54	4.54	5.07	4.54	2.00

=== Overall ===
Men's results
Rank	Skater	Nation	Total	SP		FS	
1st place, gold medalist(s)	Yuzuru Hanyu	Japan	280.09	1	101.45	1	178.64
2nd place, silver medalist(s)	Patrick Chan	Canada	275.62	2	97.52	2	178.10
3rd place, bronze medalist(s)	Denis Ten	Kazakhstan	255.10	9	84.06	3	171.04
4	Javier Fernández	Spain	253.92	3	86.98	5	166.94
5	Tatsuki Machida	Japan	253.42	11	83.48	4	169.94
6	Daisuke Takahashi	Japan	250.67	4	86.40	6	164.27
7	Yan Han	China	246.20	8	85.66	7	160.54
8	Peter Liebers	Germany	239.87	5	86.04	9	153.83
9	Jason Brown	United States	238.37	6	86.00	11	152.37
10	Michal Březina	Czech Republic	233.62	12	81.95	13	151.67
11	Tomáš Verner	Czech Republic	232.99	13	81.09	12	151.90
12	Jeremy Abbott	United States	232.70	15	72.58	8	160.12
13	Brian Joubert	France	231.77	7	85.84	14	145.93
14	Alexander Majorov	Sweden	224.86	10	83.81	16	141.05
15	Kevin Reynolds	Canada	222.23	17	68.76	10	153.47
16	Jorik Hendrickx	Belgium	214.04	16	72.52	15	141.52
17	Misha Ge	Uzbekistan	203.26	18	68.07	17	135.19
18	Florent Amodio	France	198.64	14	75.58	18	123.06
19	Michael Christian Martinez	Philippines	184.25	19	64.81	20	119.44
20	Yakov Godorozha	Ukraine	182.19	21	62.65	19	119.54
21	Alexei Bychenko	Israel	177.06	22	62.44	21	114.62
22	Abzal Rakimgaliev	Kazakhstan	174.40	20	64.18	22	110.22
23	Zoltán Kelemen	Romania	158.76	24	60.41	23	98.35
24	Viktor Romanenkov	Estonia	139.99	23	61.55	24	78.44
25	Javier Raya	Spain	59.76	25	59.76	Did not advance to free skate	
26	Viktor Pfeifer	Austria	56.60	26	56.60	Did not advance to free skate	
27	Paul Bonifacio Parkinson	Italy	56.30	27	56.30	Did not advance to free skate	
28	Liam Firus	Canada	55.04	28	55.04	Did not advance to free skate	
29	Brendan Kerry	Australia	47.12	29	47.12	Did not advance to free skate	

== Records ==
The following new record high score was set during this competition.

Record high scores
Date	Skater(s)	Segment	Score	Ref.
13 February	(Japan) Yuzuru Hanyu	Short program	101.45	

== Works cited ==
- "International Skating Union – Special Regulations & Technical Rules – Single & Pair Skating and Ice Dance 2012" (PDF). International Skating Union. June 2012. Archived from the original (PDF) on 22 February 2014.
