= Paul Bonifacio Parkinson =

Italian-Canadian figure skater (born 1991)

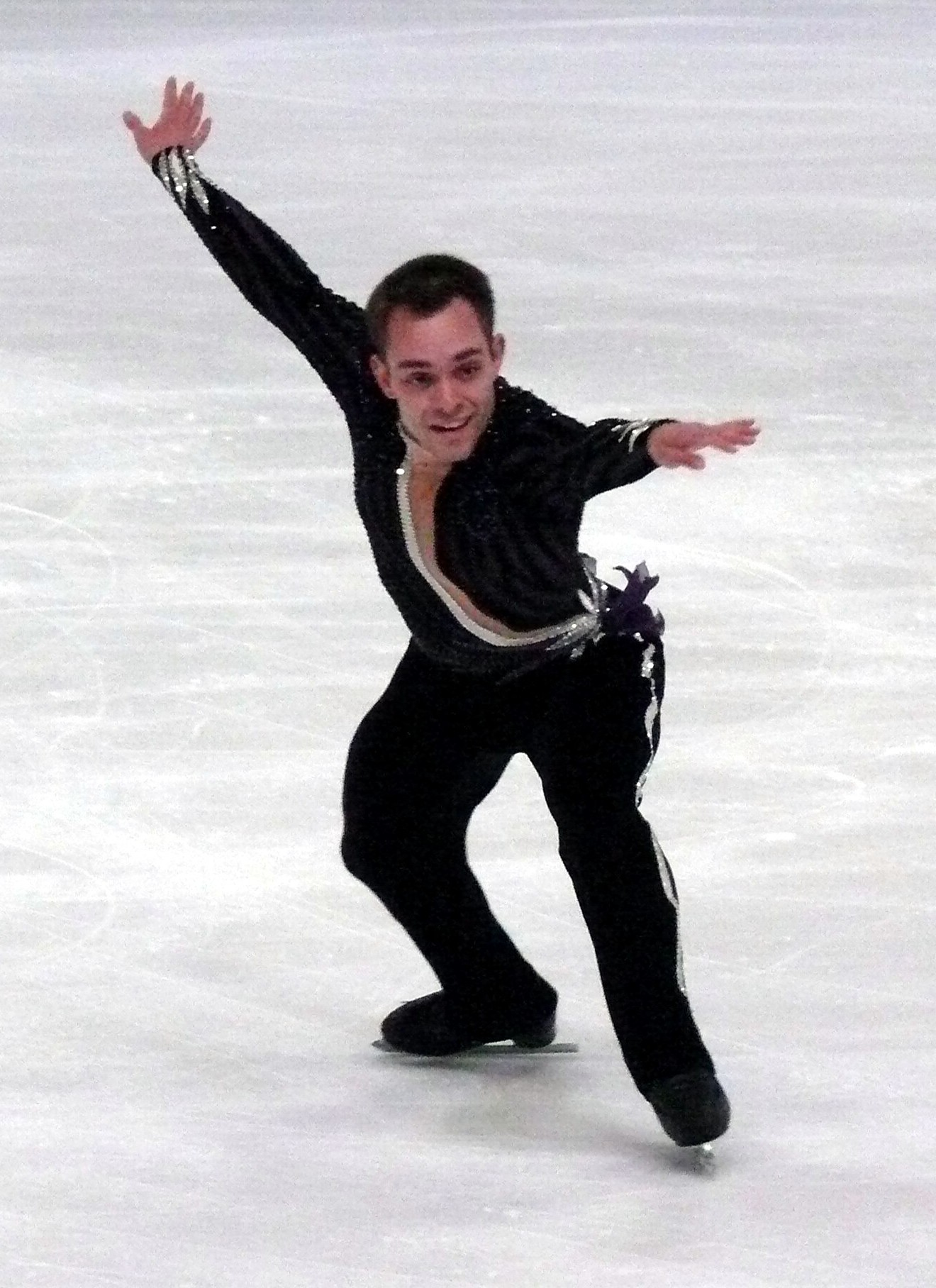
- Parkinson at the 2013 Nebelhorn Trophy

Personal information
- Born: 16 February 1991 (age 35) Ottawa, Canada
- Height: 1.70 m (5 ft 7 in)

Figure skating career
- Country: Italy
- Discipline: Men's singles
- Coach: Becky Calvin, Tom Zakrajsek, Michael Huth
- Skating club: Forum SSDRL Assago
- Began skating: 2002
- Retired: 20 March 2014

Medal record
Representing Italy
Italian Championships
Gold medal – first place	2013 Milan	Singles
Silver medal – second place	2014 Merano	Singles
Bronze medal – third place	2012 Courmayeur	Singles

Paul Bonifacio Parkinson (born 16 February 1991) is an Italian-Canadian former competitive figure skater who represented Italy in international competition. Parkinson won the 2013 Italian national title and placed 27th at the 2014 Winter Olympics. He retired from competition on 20 March 2014.

Parkinson holds dual Canadian and Italian citizenship. His mother was born in Oratino, Italy. As of March 2014, he planned to study kinesiology at the University of Toronto.

== Programs ==
Season	Short program	Free skating
2013–2014	Wolfgang's 5th Symphony by Wolfgang Gartner	Adagio; Allegro Vivo; Andante Doloroso; Andante Sostenuto all by Queen Symphony
2012–2013	Nothing Else Matters by Metallica	Adagio; Allegro Vivo; Andante Doloroso; Andante Sostenuto all by Queen Symphony
2011–2012	Nothing Else Matters by Metallica	Carnival; Artistry in Rhythm by Stan Kenton

== Competitive highlights ==
=== For Italy ===
International
Event	2009–10	2010–11	2011–12	2012–13	2013–14
Olympics					27th
Worlds				33rd	
Europeans				30th	23rd
Challenge Cup				5th	
Crystal Skate			7th		
Cup of Nice		13th			8th
Finlandia			7th		
Gardena		5th			
Golden Spin				6th	
Mont Blanc		3rd			
Nebelhorn				11th	10th
Ondrej Nepela			9th		
Triglav Trophy		4th			
U.S. Classic				9th	
Volvo Open Cup				7th	
National
Italian Champ.	4th	4th	3rd	1st	2nd
Team events
Olympics					4th T

=== For Canada ===
National
Event	2009
Canadian Championships	2nd J.
