= Javier Fernández (figure skater) =

Spanish figure skater

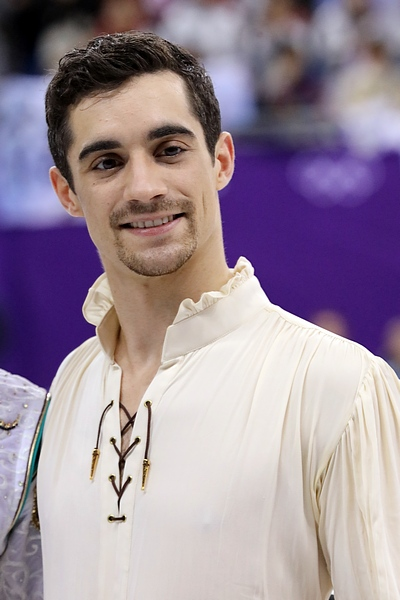
- Fernández at the 2018 Winter Olympics podium
- Born: Javier Fernández López; April 15, 1991 (age 35); Madrid, Spain
- Occupations: Figure skater; Coach; Ice show producer
- Years active: 2003–present
- Height: 1.73 m (5 ft 8 in)
- Awards: Royal Order of Sports Merit of Spain (gold medal, 2016)
- Figure skating career
- Country: Spain
- Discipline: Men's singles
- Began skating: 1997
- Competitive: 2003–19
- Professional: 2019–present
- Highest WS: 2nd (2014–15)
| Event | Gold medal – first place | Silver medal – second place | Bronze medal – third place |
| Olympic Games | 0 | 0 | 1 |
| World Championships | 2 | 0 | 2 |
| European Championships | 7 | 0 | 0 |
| Grand Prix Final | 0 | 2 | 1 |
| Spanish Championships | 8 | 1 | 0 |
Medal list
Olympic Games
| Bronze medal – third place | 2018 Pyeongchang | Singles |
World Championships
| Gold medal – first place | 2015 Shanghai | Singles |
| Gold medal – first place | 2016 Boston | Singles |
| Bronze medal – third place | 2013 London | Singles |
| Bronze medal – third place | 2014 Saitama | Singles |
European Championships
| Gold medal – first place | 2013 Zagreb | Singles |
| Gold medal – first place | 2014 Budapest | Singles |
| Gold medal – first place | 2015 Stockholm | Singles |
| Gold medal – first place | 2016 Bratislava | Singles |
| Gold medal – first place | 2017 Ostrava | Singles |
| Gold medal – first place | 2018 Moscow | Singles |
| Gold medal – first place | 2019 Minsk | Singles |
Grand Prix Final
| Silver medal – second place | 2014–15 Barcelona | Singles |
| Silver medal – second place | 2015–16 Barcelona | Singles |
| Bronze medal – third place | 2011–12 Quebec | Singles |
Spanish Championships
| Gold medal – first place | 2010 Majadahonda | Singles |
| Gold medal – first place | 2012 Jaca | Singles |
| Gold medal – first place | 2013 Majadahonda | Singles |
| Gold medal – first place | 2014 Jaca | Singles |
| Gold medal – first place | 2015 Granada | Singles |
| Gold medal – first place | 2016 San Sebastián | Singles |
| Gold medal – first place | 2017 Vielha | Singles |
| Gold medal – first place | 2018 Jaca | Singles |
| Silver medal – second place | 2011 Barcelona | Singles |

Javier Fernández López (Spanish pronunciation: [xaˈβjeɾ feɾˈnandeθ ˈlopeθ]; born 15 April 1991) is a Spanish former figure skater. He is the 2018 Olympic bronze medalist, a two-time World champion (2015, 2016), a two-time World bronze medalist (2013, 2014), a seven-time European champion (2013–2019), a two-time Grand Prix Final silver medalist (2014, 2015), and an eight-time Spanish national champion (2010, 2012–2018).

In addition to his bronze medal at the 2018 Winter Olympics, Fernández placed 14th at the 2010 Winter Olympics and 4th at the 2014 Winter Olympics.

He is the first skater from Spain to medal at an Olympic Games, ISU Championship or a Grand Prix event. Fernández is the second man to break the 100-point barrier in the short program, the 200-point barrier in the long program, and the 300-point barrier in the total score. As of 24 May 2017, he has the second highest personal best scores in both segments and third highest in the combined score.

In recognition of his achievements, Fernández received the Gold Medal of the Royal Order of Sports Merit by the Spanish government on 19 April 2016.

== Personal life ==
Javier Fernández López was born on 15 April 1991 in Madrid. He is the younger of two children born to Enriqueta, a mail carrier, and Antonio, an army mechanic. Their father stated, "Between the two children we were spending €450 a month when my earnings were less than €1,500". When Javier went to the United States to train, Antonio took a second job repairing helicopters to cover the expenses. His older sister, Laura, competed in ladies' singles and ice dancing. Fernández intends to become a coach after his competitive skating career ends. He is a fan of Real Madrid C.F.

Fernández relocated to Hackensack, New Jersey in the United States in the late summer of 2008. He moved to Toronto, Ontario, Canada in the summer of 2011.

== Competitive skating career ==
=== Early career ===
Fernández started skating at the age of six, after his older sister began taking lessons. For a while, he also played soccer, tennis, and ice hockey, but dropped the other sports to focus on skating at age eight. He skated at a small rink in the San Martín district before switching a year later to a rink in Majadahonda. One of his earliest coaches was Carolina Sanz, who stated that he had natural talent but initially lacked discipline.

Fernández landed his first triple jump at the age of 12. He had to leave Majadahonda after his sister decided to switch to the Jaca skating club, which offered to cover her costs. The youngest Fernández joined his sister in Jaca six months later.

Fernández began skating in senior events in the 2006–2007 season, but failed to qualify for the free skate at the European Championships and the World Championships in his debut season.

After two years in Jaca, where he had been teased and discouraged by a lack of improvement in his skating, he returned to Madrid and considered switching to hockey.

=== 2008–09 season ===
In 2008, Fernández attended a summer camp in Andorra where Russian coach Nikolai Morozov was an instructor. Morozov offered to train him in the United States and Fernández quickly agreed. Fernández relocated to Hackensack, New Jersey in late summer 2008. Although he shared an apartment with a Spanish coach and Morozov charged him nothing for coaching, his expenses in the United States were between €2,000 and €3,000 a month and he received no financial support from Spain.

Fernández had a breakthrough season in 2008–2009, finishing 11th at the 2009 European Championships and qualifying an Olympic spot for Spain with his 19th-place result at the 2009 World Championships. He was the first Spanish men's skater to qualify for the Olympics since 1956.

=== 2009–10 season ===
Fernández received his first senior Grand Prix assignment, the 2009 Trophée Eric Bompard where he finished 11th. He was eighth at the 2010 European Championships, earning two spots for Spain in the following year's event. In his first Olympics, Fernández placed 16th in the short program, 10th in the free skate, and finished 14th overall. He was the first man in half a century to compete for Spain in Olympic figure skating – since the 1956 Olympics when Dario Villalba competed.

Fernández set a new personal best score on his way to a 12th-place finish at the 2010 World Championships. He added the 4T to his jump repertoire in the 2009–10 season.

=== 2010–11 season ===
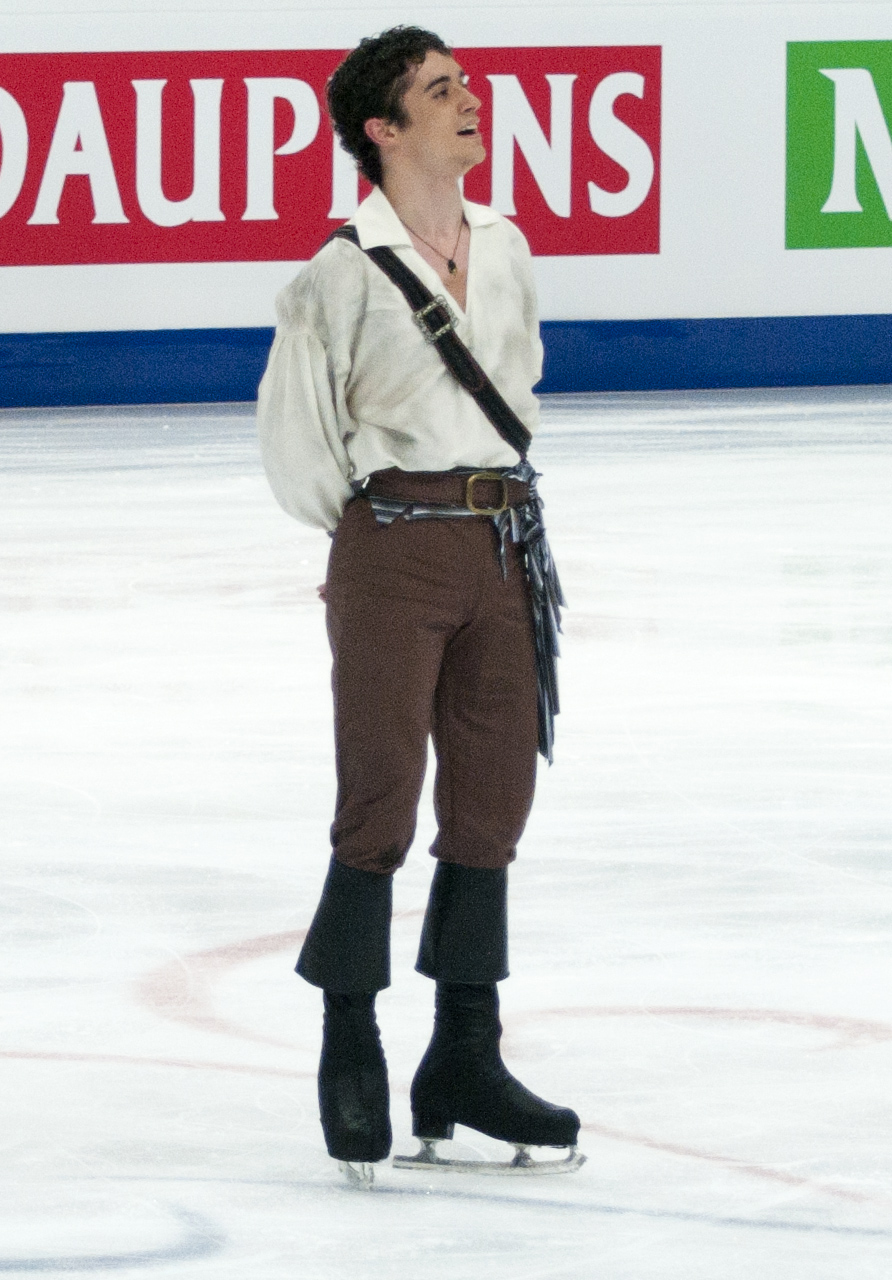
Fernandez performs his Pirates of the Caribbean program at the 2011 World Figure Skating Championships.

After Morozov moved back to Russia, Fernández trained with him in Moscow and also Daugavpils in neighboring Latvia. His assigned events for the 2010–11 ISU Grand Prix season were the 2010 Skate Canada International and the 2010 Cup of Russia. He placed fifth at Skate Canada and ninth at Cup of Russia. At the 2011 Spanish Championships, Fernández cut his hand during the warm-up and received medical attention for twenty minutes, leaving him no time to warm up again. He was unable to defend his title, placing second behind Javier Raya. Since Spain had two men's slots at the 2011 European Championships due to Fernández' result the previous year, both skaters were sent to Bern, Switzerland. Fernández fell twice in the short program, leaving him in eleventh place, but was able to move up to ninth after the free skate and once again earned two spots for Spain at the next Europeans. At the 2011 World Championships, Fernández landed two different quads, (toe loop and Salchow), in the free skate. He earned his first top-ten finish at the event, giving Spain two spots for the 2012 Worlds men's event.

In June 2011, Fernández confirmed that he was no longer working with Morozov and would temporarily train in Canada with Brian Orser. This was due to instability resulting from Morozov's training group moving around frequently and Morozov's focus on Florent Amodio. He said that adding a quad to his short program and improving his basic skating were some of his goals for the 2011–12 season.

=== 2011–12 season ===
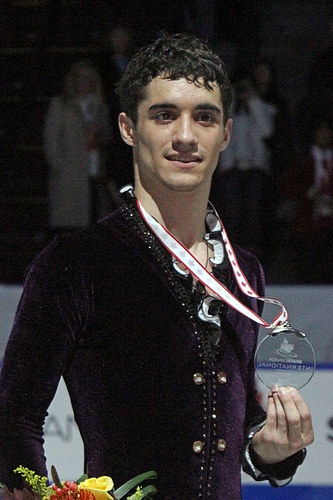
Fernández at the 2011 Skate Canada International

Fernández finished 4th at his first competition of the season, the 2011 Nebelhorn Trophy. At an interview conducted at the event, he said that he would continue to train in Canada, with David Wilson and Jeffrey Buttle as his choreographers. Fernández and Orser said they were working on saving energy and improving spins, transitions and skating skills.

His assigned events for the 2011–12 Grand Prix season were Skate Canada and Cup of Russia. At Skate Canada, Fernández executed the only clean quadruple jump in the short program to take the lead over Daisuke Takahashi and Patrick Chan. He placed second in the free skate and won the silver medal overall, exceeding his combined total personal best by over thirty points. He became the first Spanish skater to win a Grand Prix medal. At the Cup of Russia, he placed fourth in the short program, first in the free skate, and finished second overall with an overall total of 241.63 points — only 0.03 behind gold medalist Yuzuru Hanyu of Japan. Fernández became the first Spanish skater to ever qualify for the Grand Prix of Figure Skating Final when he qualified for the 2011–12 event. In Quebec City, he was third in the short program and fourth in the long to win the bronze medal, and in so doing, became the first Spaniard to medal at a Grand Prix Final. Fernández reclaimed his national title, winning by over eighty points.

The remainder of the season proved less successful for Fernández. Although considered a medal favorite at the 2012 Europeans, he finished sixth. At the 2012 World Championships, Fernández placed fifth in the short program but dropped to ninth overall after the free skate. After these results, he agreed to perform full run-throughs of his programs more frequently in practice.

=== 2012–13 season ===
ISU abbreviations: Jumps
| T | Toe loop |
| S | Salchow |
| Lo | Loop |
| F | Flip |
| Lz | Lutz |
| A | Axel |

Fernández started his season at the 2012 Finlandia Trophy, where he won the bronze medal. His first Grand Prix event of the season was Skate Canada, where he beat defending Skate Canada and World champion, Patrick Chan, to take the gold medal. Fernández became the first Spaniard to win a gold medal in the Grand Prix series. Despite his fourth place at the 2012 NHK Trophy, he qualified for the Grand Prix Final. He finished fourth overall at the final after winning the free program with a 4S-3T jump combination, 4S, and 4T. He became the second European to execute three quads in one program — the first being Brian Joubert who landed a 4T-2T combination, 4T, and 4S at the 2006 Cup of Russia — and the first European to do so with a quad-triple combination.

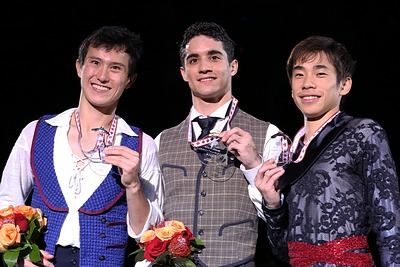
Fernández (center) claims his first Grand Prix gold at the 2012 Skate Canada, with Patrick Chan (left) and Nobunari Oda (right).

In December 2012, Fernández won his third national title. At the 2013 European Championships he missed some practice time due to his skates being lost at the airport, but they were found one day before the start of the competition. Second in the short program, Fernández then placed first in the free skate, landing three quads jumps with one in combination. He won the gold medal and became the first Spanish skater to win a European title. He posted a new personal best overall score of 274.87 points. He later joked, "I have to make sure I lose my skates again!" At this time, Spain had just 14 indoor rinks and 600 registered figure skaters.

At the 2013 World Championships in London, Ontario, Fernández placed 7th in the short program and 4th in the free skate. His total score of 249.06 points won him the bronze medal behind three-time World champion Patrick Chan and silver medalist Denis Ten. He became the first Spanish skater to stand on a World Championships podium in figure skating.

=== 2013–14 season ===
In October 2013, Fernández was invited to skate at the 2013 Japan Open as part of Team Europe alongside Michal Březina, Adelina Sotnikova and Irina Slutskaya. He scored 176.91 points in the free program and won the men's event while Team Europe placed third. In the 2013–14 Grand Prix season, Fernández placed fifth at the 2013 NHK Trophy and third at the 2013 Rostelecom Cup, not enough to qualify for the Grand Prix Final. In December, he won his fourth national title.

Fernández chose to use old skates after struggling with two new pairs of boots. He entered the 2014 European Championships in Budapest, Hungary, as the defending champion. He placed first in the short program with a clean skate, 6 points ahead of Russia's Sergei Voronov. His score of 91.56 was a new personal best at the time – the first occasion he crossed the 90 point mark in international competition. In his free skate, Fernández completed three quads (stepping out of the opening toe loop and the second quad Salchow), a triple Axel and five more triples, but doubled a Lutz and underrotated the second jump of his quad Salchow-triple toe loop combination. He scored 175.55 points in the segment, 267.11 points overall, and won the European title for the second year in a row.

In February, Fernández competed in the men's singles event at the 2014 Winter Olympics in Sochi, Russia. He was the flag bearer for Spain during the opening ceremony. Earning 86.98 points in the short program, he placed third behind Yuzuru Hanyu and Patrick Chan, having stepped out of his quad Salchow and triple Lutz-triple toe loop combination. In the free skate, he landed a quad toe loop and a quad Salchow – the latter in combination – but tripled a second quad Salchow attempt. He went on to complete another triple Salchow as the last jump of his skate, which – having been repeated in the program – was rated as an invalid element, and received no points. He placed fifth in the free skate segment with 166.94 points, ultimately coming in fourth, 1.18 points behind Olympic bronze medalist Denis Ten of Kazakhstan.

Fernández ended his season at the 2014 World Championships in Saitama, Japan. He skated a clean short program and earned 96.42 points, improving on his personal best in the segment by 4.86 points. He stood in third place behind Sochi Olympic champion Yuzuru Hanyu and Tatsuki Machida of Japan. He landed three quads in his free skate along with five triples, but singled a planned triple Lutz and added only a double as the second jump of his quad Salchow combination. He placed third in the segment with 179.51 points for a total score of 275.93, and repeated as World bronze medalist, behind Hanyu (gold) and Machida (silver).

=== 2014–15 season ===
Fernández originally planned to sit out of the Grand Prix series but decided to take part after he found out that the Final would be held in his home country.

Fernández began his Grand Prix season with a silver medal at the 2014 Skate Canada International, finishing eleven points behind Japan's Takahito Mura. Defeating Russia's Sergei Voronov by thirteen points, he won gold at the 2014 Rostelecom Cup and qualified for his third Grand Prix Final. At the Final, held in Barcelona, Fernández placed fifth in the short program after he fell on his quadruple Salchow jump, doubled the first jump of his planned tiple Lutz-triple toe loop combination, and stumbled during connecting steps. He scored 79.18 points, trailing leader Yuzuru Hanyu by almost 15 points. He recovered to place second in the free skate, again behind Hanyu, with a program that included two quad jumps, six triple jumps, and level-four spins and footwork, but he tripled a planned quad Salchow jump and singled a triple Lutz jump. He scored 174.72 points in the free skate, and 253.90 in total. Overall, he won the silver medal behind Yuzuru Hanyu.

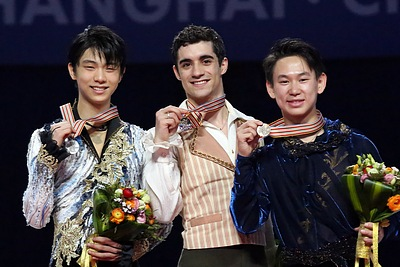
Fernández (center) atop the podium at the 2015 World Figure Skating Championships with Yuzuru Hanyu (left) and Denis Ten (right)

At the 2015 European Championships in Stockholm, Fernández took the lead in the short program after he stepped out of his quad Salchow and the second jump of his triple Lutz-triple toe loop combination, but completed a triple Axel jump and level-four spins and footwork, scoring 89.24 points in the segment. In the free skate, he completed a quad toe loop and six triple jumps, but fell on a quad Salchow jump attempt and tripled another. Despite the errors, he won the free skate with 173.25 points, more than 15 points ahead of Russia's Maxim Kovtun, and claimed his third consecutive European title with a total of 262.49 points.

Fernández skated a clean short program at the 2015 World Championships in Shanghai, which included a quad Salchow, a triple Lutz-triple toe loop combination, a triple Axel and level-four spins. But his step sequence was rated level-three and his triple Axel was not perfect. He earned 92.74 points and stood in second place, less than 2.5 points behind Yuzuru Hanyu. He produced a free skate with two quads, six triples, level-four spins and level-three step sequence. His only major error was a fall on a quad Salchow attempt. He placed second in the segment with 181.16 points – his strongest free skate of the season – more than 5 points ahead of Hanyu and just 0.67 behind Kazakhstan's Denis Ten. Overall, he outscored Olympic champion Yuzuru Hanyu (silver) and Olympic bronze medalist Denis Ten (bronze) for the gold medal, having received a total of 273.90 points. He became the first skater from Spain to win a world title in figure skating.

=== 2015–16 season ===
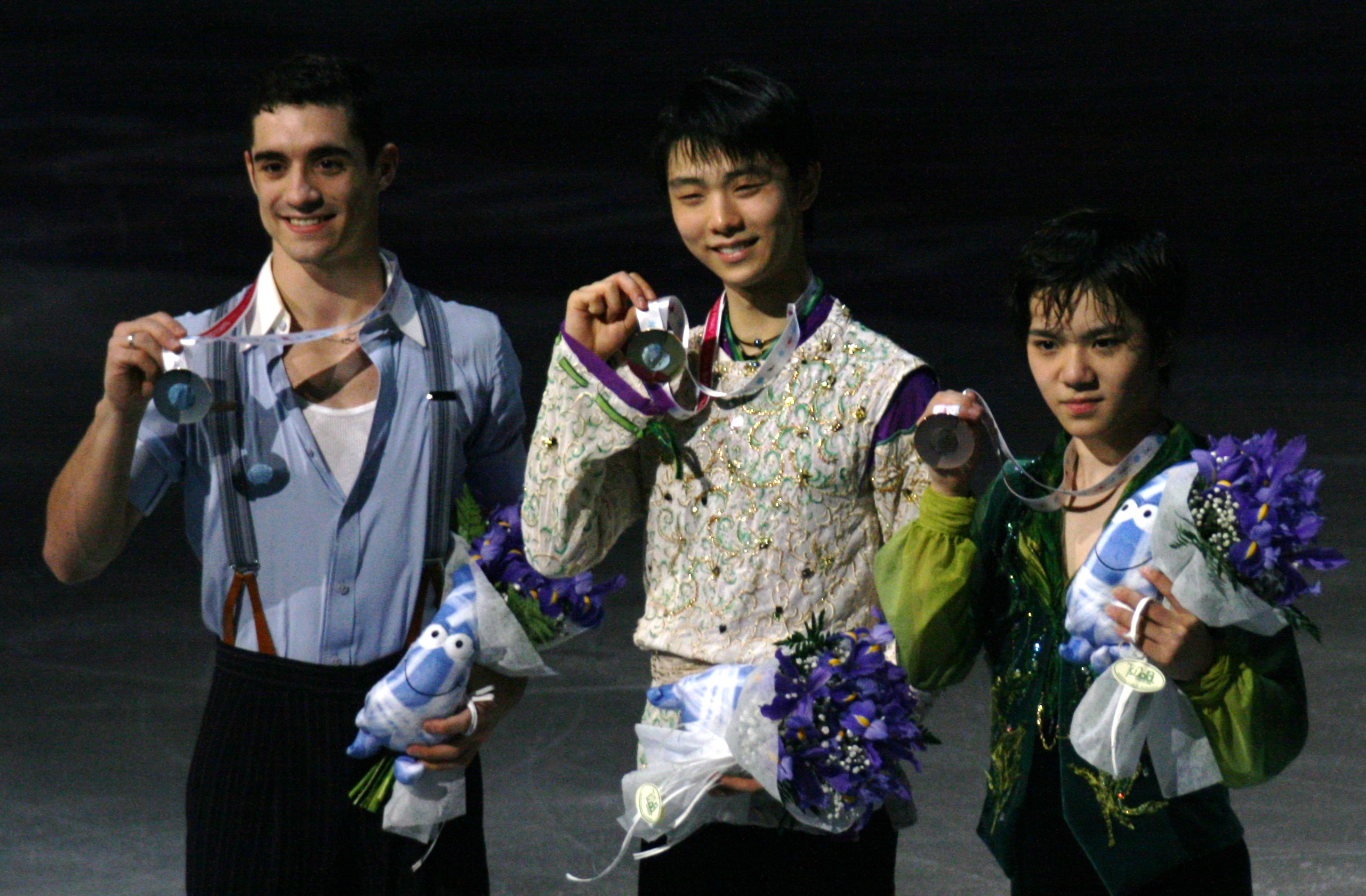
Fernández (left) as the silver medalist at the 2015–16 Grand Prix Final, with Yuzuru Hanyu (center) and Shoma Uno (right)

During the 2015–16 Grand Prix series, Fernández won gold at both of his events, the 2015 Cup of China and 2015 Rostelecom Cup, and qualified for the 2015–16 Grand Prix Final in Barcelona. Second to Hanyu in both segments in Barcelona, he won silver in the Grand Prix Final for the second year in a row. In the free program, he landed his three planned quadruple jumps and scored 201.43 points, becoming the second skater in history to receive over 200 points in this segment.

Fernández defended his national title at the Spanish Championships in December 2015, attempting and completing two quadruple jumps in the short program for the first time in his career (a quad toe loop in combination with a triple toe loop, and a quad Salchow).

At the 2016 European Championships in Bratislava, Fernández successfully landed a quad toe loop-triple toe loop combination, quad Salchow, and triple Axel to score a new personal best of 102.54 points in the short program. With this score, he became only the second man in history to break 100 points in that segment. With a 14-point advantage going into the free skate, Fernández landed three quadruple jumps, but fell on the second triple Axel of the program (which he had just added). He scored 200.23 points, for a combined total of 302.77, becoming the second skater in history to cross the 300 point mark. He finished ahead of silver medalist Oleksii Bychenko by a margin of over 60 points.

Entering the 2016 World Championships in Boston as the defending champion, Fernández opened his short program with a quad toe loop-triple toe loop combination, then fell on his quad Salchow attempt, but recovered to complete a triple Axel, two level-four spins and level-four footwork, scoring 98.52 points and securing second place. After the short program, he could do little practice due to a recurring bursa on the heel of his right foot. On the day of the free skate, the medical team of the event attended to his injury for several hours and helped him to alleviate the problem. Fernández entered the free skate segment with a 12.04 deficit behind Yuzuru Hanyu – the largest point gap at the time between first and second place after the short program in any discipline at a World Championships or Olympic Games under the ISU judging system. Fernández completed a clean free skate, which included three quads (a toe loop and two Salchows, one in combination with a triple toe loop), two triple Axels, four more triples as well as difficult spins and level-four footwork, and scored 216.41, surpassing his personal best in the segment by 14.98 points. He reached a total score of 314.93, also a new personal best. His free skating and total scores were the second and third highest, respectively, under the ISU judging system as of the event. Hanyu made mistakes in his free skate, allowing Fernández to close the point gap and overtake him by a further 19.76 points to become the 2016 World champion.

According to a May 2016 news article, Fernández's income from shows is greater than his competitive earnings. When he won his second World title, Spain had 17 ice rinks, compared to a hundred in Toronto, and 300 licensed skaters, compared to about 15,000 in France.

=== 2016–17 season ===
Fernández was assigned to the Rostelecom Cup and the Trophée de France for the 2016–17 Grand Prix series. He trailed Japan's Shoma Uno after the short program at the Russian Grand Prix event, having tripled one of his quad attempts. In the free skate, Fernández produced three quads, two triple Axels, and received the first 200+ long program score of the season: 201.43. One week later, he won both the short program and the free skate at the French Grand Prix, despite a fall in each segment of the event – on a quad toe loop in the short program, and a triple Axel in the free skate. He collected 15 points from both events and qualified for the 2016–17 Grand Prix Final with maximum points.

At the Grand Prix Final in Marseille, Fernández placed third in the short program with 91.76 points, after landing a quad toe loop-triple toe loop combination, but stumbling on his quad Salchow and falling on the triple Axel. In the free skate, he tripled a planned quad toe loop, underrotated and stumbled on a quad Salchow and fell on his second triple Axel. He finished fourth in the free skate with 177.01 points and dropped to 4th place overall with a total score of 268.77. This was the first event since the 2014 Winter Olympic Games in which Fernández failed to make the podium.

Fernández won his seventh national title at the Spanish Championships in December 2016. He landed two quads in his short program (the toe loop in combination with a triple toe loop, and the Salchow with a hand down) to take the lead, and followed with a free skate which included two quads (a toe loop and a Salchow) and two triple Axels (the first in combination with a triple toe loop – a new element for Fernández).

The 2017 European Championships were held in Ostrava. Fernández skated a clean short program including two quads (one in combination with a triple), a triple Axel and all level four elements to claim first place in the segment and achieve a new personal best of 104.25 points. His free skate included three quads and seven triples; however, he over-rotated his first quad Salchow and fell on the second. Fernández recovered to finish his routine and earned 190.59 points, winning the free skating segment over Russian Maxim Kovtun by over 18 points. Fernández received 294.84 points overall to win the gold medal, and became only the third men's skater to win five consecutive European titles, following Ondrej Nepela (1969–73), and Karl Schäfer, who won the title 8 consecutive times (1929–36).

At the 2017 World Championships in Helsinki, Fernández set a new personal best in the short program, in which he successfully executed all the jump elements (a quad-triple toe loop combination, a quad Salchow and a triple Axel), three level four spins, and received maximum grades of execution from every judge for the step sequence. He received 109.05 points in the short program to take the lead, the third highest mark ever at the time of the event. Fernández started his free skate a quad toe loop, quad Salchow-triple toe loop and triple Axel-double toe loop, but fell on another quad Salchow attempt, doubled a planned triple flip and stumbled on the landing of the triple loop to finish 6th in the segment, dropping him to 4th place overall. It was the first time off the podium at a World Championships since 2012.

=== 2017–18 season ===
Fernández began the season earlier than usual by participating in the Skate Canada Autumn Classic International. Although other skaters were now incorporating more quad jumps into their programs, Fernández stuck with two quads in the short program and three in the free program. He received 101.20 points for his short program after executing a quad toe loop-double toe loop, a quad Salchow, and a triple Axel, 11.52 points behind Yuzuru Hanyu. Fernández popped his first quad Salchow attempt during the free program, which was subsequently downgraded, but landed two clean quads and five triples to receive 177.87 points. He earned 279.07 points in total to overtake Hanyu and win the gold medal.

Fernández competed for Team Europe at the Japan Open invitational tournament in Saitama, alongside Evgenia Medvedeva, Alina Zagitova and Oleksii Bychenko. He performed two quads and two triple Axels in his free skate, winning the men's discipline with 189.47 points. Team Europe narrowly beat Team Japan to win the overall competition.

During the 2017–18 Grand Prix series, Fernández first competed in the 2017 Cup of China. He placed 3rd in the short program after popping his planned quadruple-triple combination, scoring 90.57 points. He made several mistakes in the free skate to finish 6th in this segment (162.49) and 6th overall (253.06). It was revealed after the competition that Fernández had been suffering from stomach problems. His second Grand Prix assignment was the 2017 Internationaux de France in Grenoble. Fernández won the short program with a clean skate for which he received 107.86 points, the 5th highest short program score on record at the time of the event. In the free skate, Fernández fell twice and stepped out of the landings of three other jumps to finish 2nd behind Shoma Uno in the segment with 175.85 points. His lead from the short program was enough to win the event overall with 283.71 points. This was the 7th career Grand Prix title for Fernández.

In December 2017, Fernández claimed his 7th consecutive and 8th overall senior Spanish national title. He hit all planned jumps in the short program to receive 107.73 points, and landed two quads during the free skate before falling on the third to score 180.57 points in the segment and 288.30 points overall. His qualification for the 2018 Winter Olympics was not determined by this event, as it had been announced previously that Fernández would take the first of Spain's two spots in the men's discipline. Fernández announced that the 2018 Winter Olympics in PyeongChang would be his last Olympic Games.

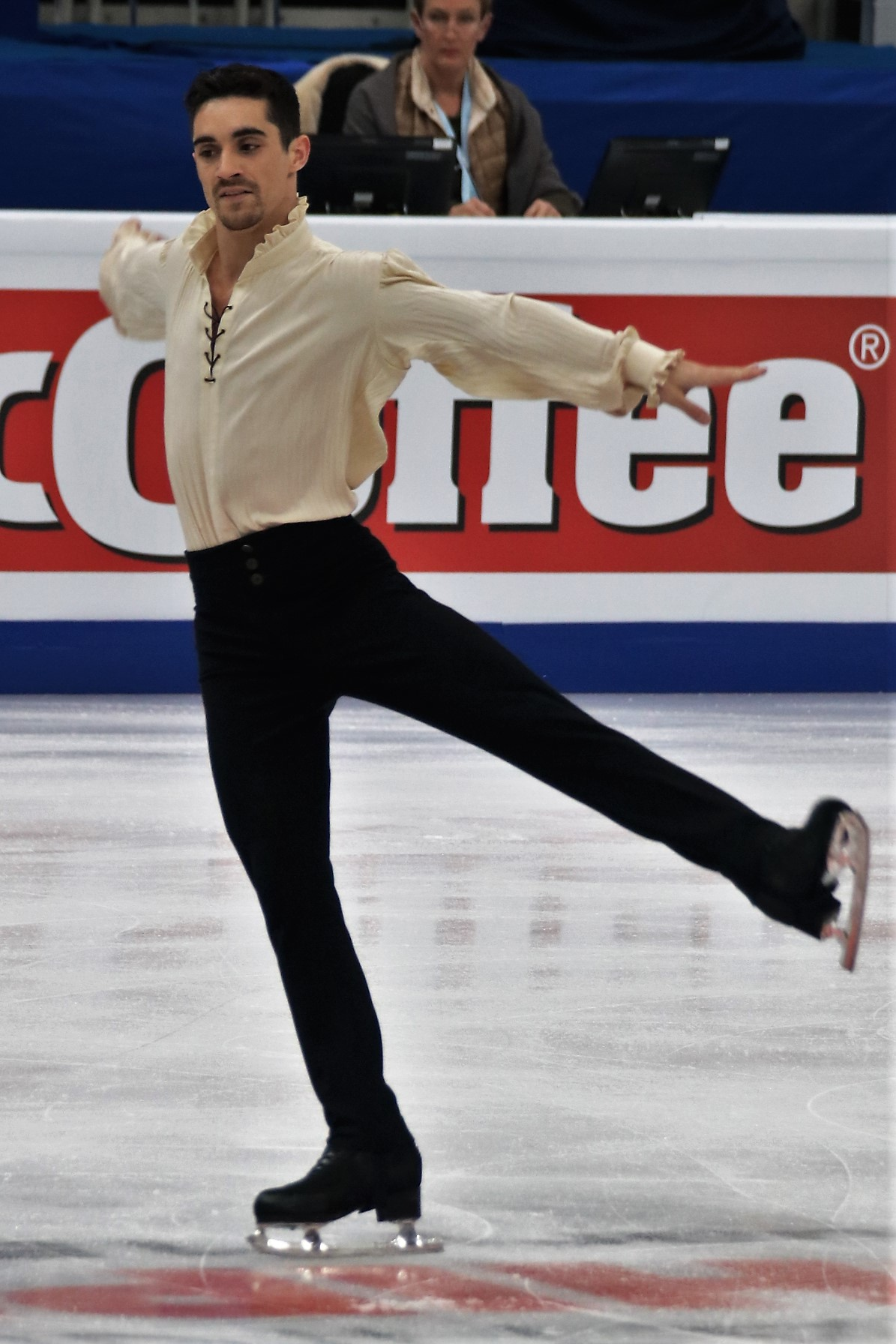
Fernández at the 2018 European Figure Skating Championships, where he claimed his sixth consecutive title

At the 2018 European Championships in Moscow, Fernández had a sizable lead following the short program, which included a quad-triple toe loop combination, a triple Axel and level 4 spins, but also a turn out on the landing of the quad Salchow. Fernández received 103.82 points in the segment, 12.49 points ahead of nearest rival Dmitri Aliev. Fernández hit two quads, two triple Axels and three other triples to win the free skating, but popped his third quad attempt to a triple and stumbled on a downgraded triple flip. He earned 191.73 points in the segment, improving on his previous season's best by nearly 14 points, and won the gold medal with a total of 295.55 points. Fernández became the first man in 82 years to have won the European Championships 6 consecutive times (2013–18). The other skaters who won at least six consecutive European titles are Karl Schäfer, Sonja Henie (1931–36), Katarina Witt (6 years, 1983–88), Marika Kilius / Hans-Jürgen Bäumler (1959–64), and Irina Rodnina (with two partners: Alexei Ulanov, 1969–72 and Alexander Zaitsev, 1973–78).

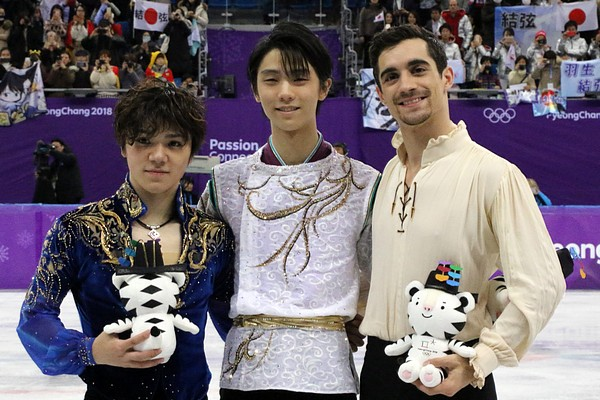
Fernández (right) after winning the bronze medal at the 2018 Winter Olympic Games, with Yuzuru Hanyu (center) and Shoma Uno (left)

At the 2018 Winter Olympics, Fernández skated his "Modern Times" short program, executing a quad-triple toe loop combination, a quad Salchow, a triple Axel and all level 4 elements. He received nine perfect 10.00 scores in program components and received 107.58 points, placing him second in that segment behind defending champion Yuzuru Hanyu. In the free skate, Fernández landed a quad toe loop, a quad Salchow in combination, two triple Axels and five more triples, and earned four perfect 10.00 component marks. His only major mistake was popping a planned second quad Salchow into a double. His free skate performance earned 197.66 points and a total competition score of 305.24 – both season's best for him. Fernández won the bronze medal behind Japan's Hanyu and Shoma Uno, the first ever figure skating Olympic medal for Spain. In the figure skating gala, Fernández performed his aerobics class exhibition program wearing in a "Super Javi" Spanish-colored Superman costume.; the program included parodies of Flashdance and iconic 1980's workout jams.

After the men's individual competition at the 2018 Winter Olympics concluded, Fernández returned to Madrid where he confirmed to Spanish media that he would not be competing at the 2018 World Championships in Milan. He cited his satisfaction with winning the bronze medal in PyeongChang to finish his season as the reason for the decision. Fernández also stated his intention to leave Canada, where he had trained since 2011, and return to Madrid to promote figure skating in Spain. Although he did not rule out future competitions entirely, he confirmed that he would not participate in another World Championships or Olympics.

=== 2018–19 season ===
With the establishment of the new +5 / -5 Grade of Execution (GOE) scale at the start of the season, all previously recorded scores since the 2004 introduction of the ISU Judging System (IJS) were archived as historical statistics. During the 14 seasons the +3 / -3 GOE scale was in use, Fernández achieved the 2nd highest personal best short program score (109.05), the 3rd highest free skating score (216.41) and the 4th highest total score (314.93).

Fernández decided to skip the 2018–19 Grand Prix series, and elected to skate at the Japan Open invitational tournament as his only competition during the first part of the season. He competed for Team Europe at the event, and placed 3rd among men with a score of 157.86 for his free program. Team Europe won the silver medal overall.

On 28 November, Fernández officially stated that he would retire from competitive skating, with the 2019 European Figure Skating Championships as his last competition. Speaking about his decision, he expressed the need to think about the level of competition he wanted to be at, because he felt his body and mind were no longer there, which he had to accept. He added that he preferred to retire at the right time, when he was satisfied with his career and had plans for the future, referring among other projects to his Revolution ON Ice skating show, with which he toured Spain in November and December 2018. The news of his retirement was widely reported in Spanish as well as global media. It was also confirmed that Fernández would not compete at the Spanish National Championships in December.

Fernández returned to his Toronto base in early January to train for three weeks leading up to the 2019 European Figure Skating Championships. As a tribute to his home country, he selected two Spanish themed programs from his earlier repertoire for his final competition: Malagueña as the short program, and Man of La Mancha for the free skate.

Fernández placed third in the short program at European Championships with 91.84 points after stepping out of the landing of the triple Axel and receiving an underrotation call on his quad Salchow. In the free skate, Fernández landed two quads (with a turnout on the landing of the second jump of his quad-triple toe loop combination), two triple Axels and three more triples, but missed out on his triple flip attempt. He finished first in the segment with 179.75 points, receiving the highest free program component scores (94.20) since the introduction of the revised scoring system at the start of the season, and rose from third to first overall with 271.59 points. Fernández retired from competitive figure skating with the third highest number of consecutive European titles behind pairs skater Irina Rodnina (who had won 10) and men's skater Karl Schäfer (with 8).

Commenting on what he leaves behind as legacy, Fernández stated: "I think it's good for the world to know that not only skaters from strong countries can appear. I'm from Spain, I’ve got a friend here at my side from Italy [bronze medalist Matteo Rizzo] and another from Russia [silver medalist Alexander Samarin]. Everyone has his own story to tell and it's good that everyone does not come from a strong figure skating country because that means more stories to tell to everyone. I hope I can develop skating more in my home country to try and make it bigger, but I hope with the work I was able to do I've made history and in 20 years some people will still recollect my name." As for what heritage he would like to leave to skaters, he said: "I would like to leave behind a question to think about. What do they prefer: jumps, skating skills or performance? I would like to see these from more skaters. I think this is what our sport needs – complete skaters who embody something from every aspect of the sport."

When asked about what his student's legacy to the sport will be, long-time coach Brian Orser said: "For me and Tracy [Wilson, coaching partner], he is our “poster child,” the very example of what we do with our style of training and coaching. He has done something great for men's skating. He is a perfect model for what male skating should be: athletic and aesthetic, bringing a very personal style. He is also the young boy from Spain who made it. This is something very important and special about him. He promotes skating in his home country, through his shows all over Spain and skating camps. I’ve seen him teaching. He teaches technique and style the way we do. This makes me very proud. He will be an excellent coach."

== Professional skating career ==
=== Show skating career ===
At the end of 2018, a few months prior to his official retirement from competitive skating in January 2019, Fernández had already produced his first ice show Revolution On Ice that toured through Spain with performances in front of sell-out crowds. The production featured live music, guest artists and a range of skating stars from around the world such as Yuna Kim, Yuka Sato, Kurt Browning, Evgeni Plushenko and Jeffrey Buttle. The show was directed by Canadian choreographers Sandra Bezic and David Wilson. Fernández brought Revolution On Ice back a year later at the end of 2019 that included performances from guest skaters Jeffrey Buttle, Ashley Wagner, Elladj Baldé, Anna Cappellini and Luca Lanotte, Olivia Smart and Adrián Diaz. As a result of the Russian invasion of Ukraine in February 2022, Fernández decided to postpone the 2022 edition of the show.

Throughout his career, Fernández has performed in a variety of exhibitions and shows abroad such as the Canadian Stars On Ice tour, Stars On Ice Japan, Dreams On Ice, and Fantasy On Ice in Japan. In June 2019, Fernández was cast in Yuna Kim's show All That Skate that took place in Seoul, Korea. The show was directed by Sandra Bezic and David Wilson and also featured Kim, Nathan Chen, Shoma Uno, Gabriella Papadakis and Guillaume Cizeron, Vanessa James and Morgan Cipres. In March 2024 Fernandez performed in Notte stellata, show held in Miyagi as a commemorative event for the 2011 Tōhoku earthquake and tsunami led by Yuzuru Hanyu.

=== Coaching ===
On December 6, 2021, Fernández opened a figure skating academy at Madrid's Palacio de Hielo (Ice Palace). Fernández travels with his academy, doing skating classes, seminars and summer camps in Mexico and Italy, and hosts his own summer camp in Spain on an annual basis with the next one due to take place in Spain at the end of July/early August 2023.

In 2023, Fernández began coaching at the Amodio Figure Skating Academy in Vaujany, France, working alongside longtime friend, Florent Amodio. Skaters he has notably worked with have included Luc Economides and Ekaterina Kurakova.

== Skating technique ==
Fernandez's quadruple jumps (Salchow and toe loop) have been remarked for their smooth and effortless execution, with a straight position in the air and great ice coverage. He and his former training mate Yuzuru Hanyu are the only two skaters to receive the maximum possible GOE on the quadruple Salchow and the quadruple toe loop. He's also one of the four skaters to ever receive a perfect score on a triple Axel. Fernandez holds the second-highest historical technical element score (TES) in the short program behind Hanyu.

Skating wise, Fernandez has been praised for the quality of his edges and the complexity of his steps. His components scores raised throughout his career, receiving 10 perfect scores in composition and interpretation at the 2016 Worlds. Fernandez holds the 2nd highest historical component score (PCS) in both the short and free program, also behind Hanyu.

== Public life and popular culture ==
=== Endorsements and partnerships ===
In early 2017, La Liga announced that they had signed a sponsorship agreement with Fernández as part of its initiative to support Spanish athletes from different types of sports. Fernández became a brand ambassador for Spanish food and beverage company ElPozo in May 2018, and the company sponsored Fernández's ice show Revolution On Ice in 2018 and 2019.

=== Television ===
In August 2023, RTVE released its documentary series Javier Fernández. Rompiendo el hielo. The series consists of three episodes and is based on more than 35 interviews with Fernández, his family, friends, coaches, reporters, athletes and fellow skaters. The series won a Silver Dolphin at the Cannes Corporate Media & TV Awards.

Fernández appeared in the 8th season of the reality series Gran Hermano VIP, the Spanish adaptation of the international reality television franchise Big Brother. He entered the house on September 14, 2023, and left a month and a half later on November 2, 2023.

== Awards ==
Royal Order of Sports Merit of Spain

- Gold Medal (2016)

Spanish Olympic Committee

- Outstanding Athlete of the Year (2014, 2018)

National Sports Council

- National Sports Awards: King Felipe Award for Best Sportsman (2015)

Media

- AS Sports Awards: Athlete of the Year 2015 (2015)
- Madrid Sports Press Association (APDM): Individual Athlete of the Year (2017)
- La Razón: Ussía Awards "Personage of the Year" (2019)
- Marca: 80th Anniversary Awards "Spirit of Success in Sport: Perfection" (2018), Marca Leyenda (2019)

Municipality

- Order of the Second of May of the Community of Madrid: Grand Cross (2015)
- Medal of the City of Madrid: gold medal (2017)
- Medal of the Community of Madrid: gold medal (2017)

== Programs ==
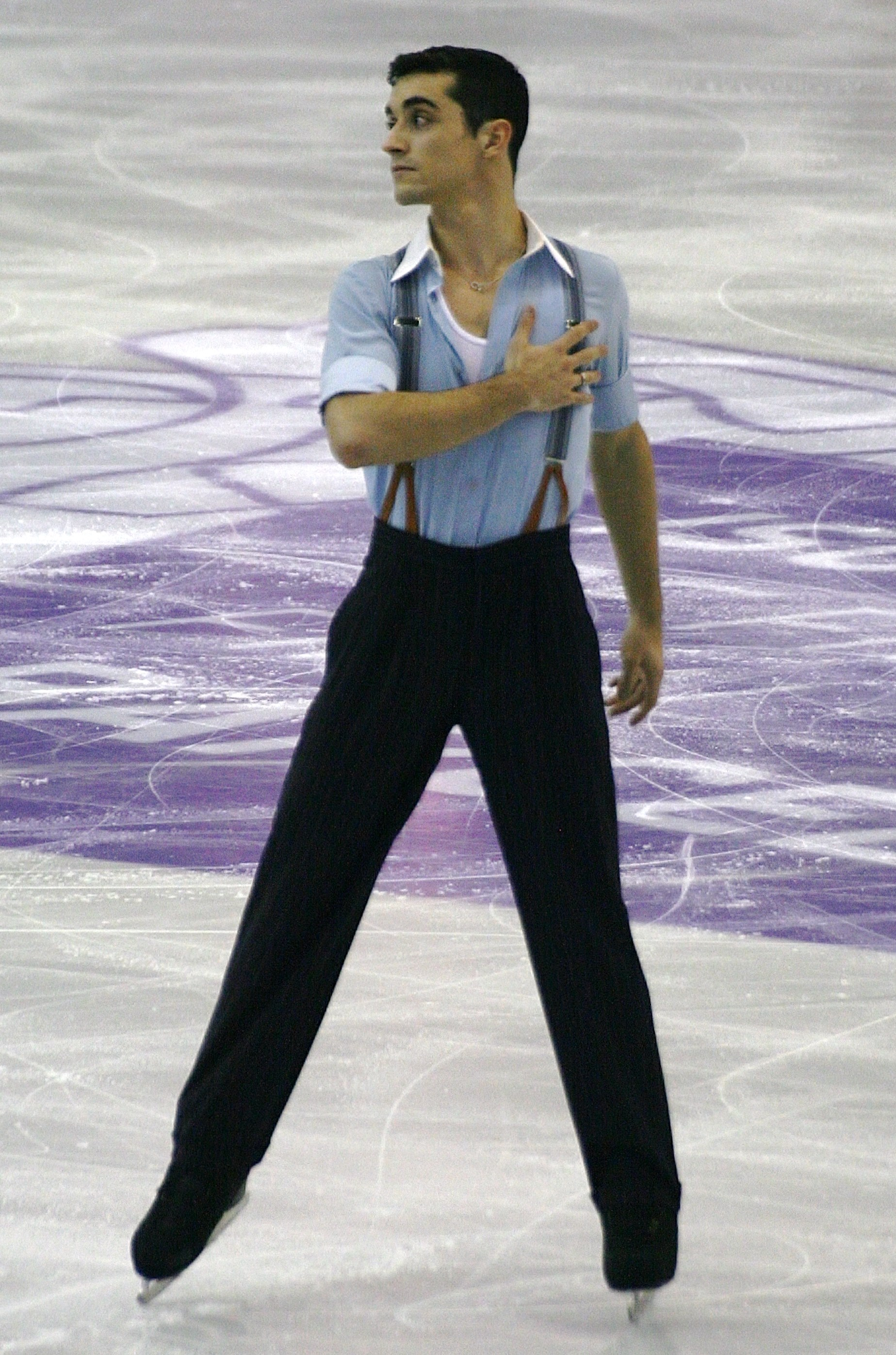
Fernández at the 2015–16 Grand Prix of Figure Skating Final

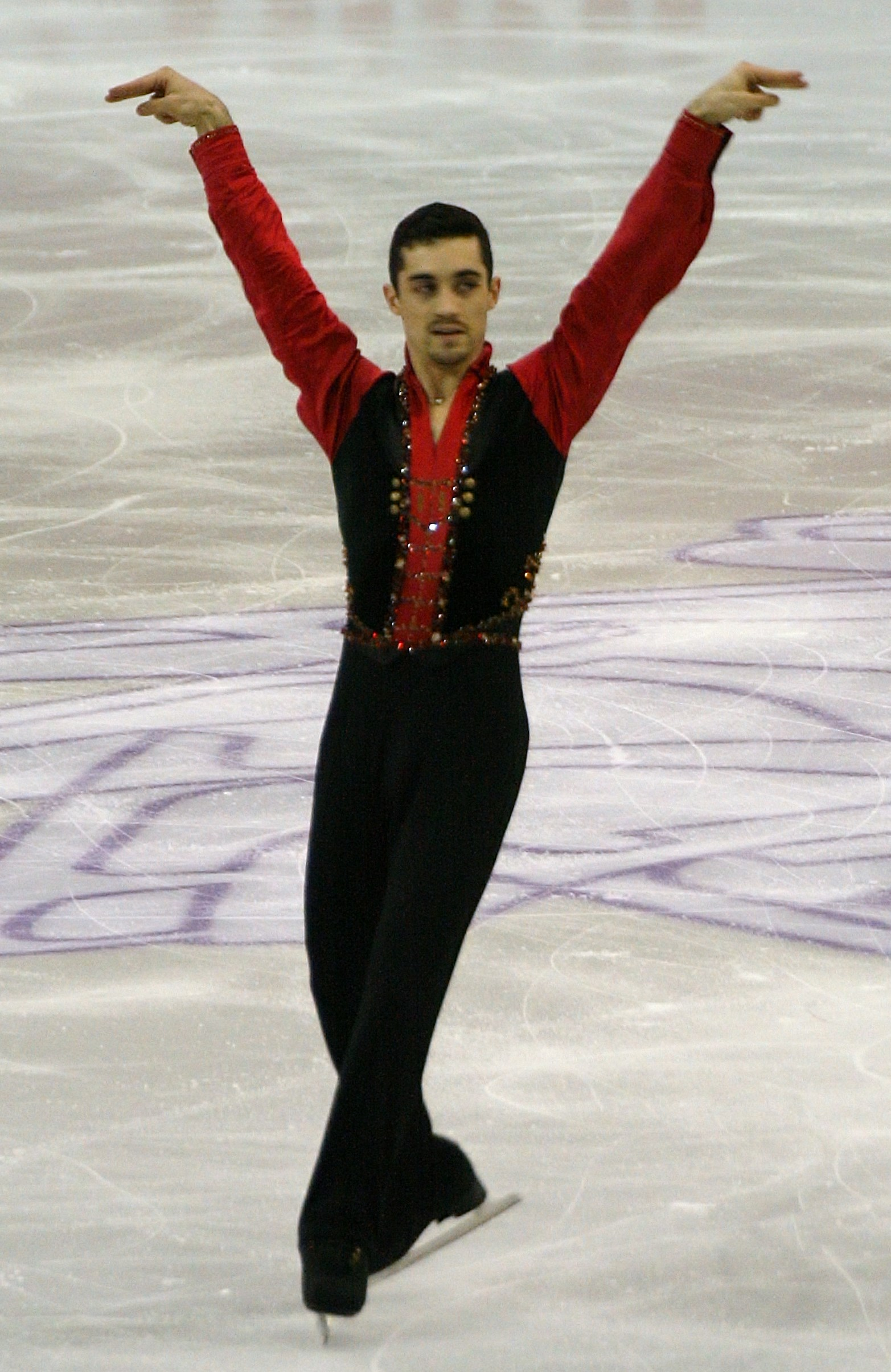
Fernández at the 2015–16 Grand Prix of Figure Skating Final

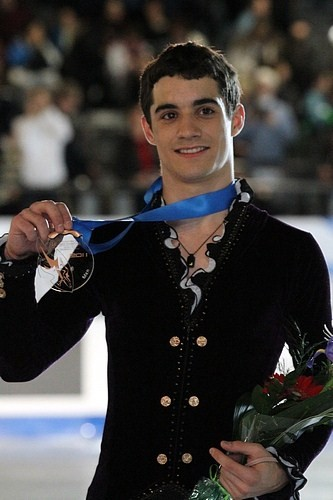
Fernández at the 2011–12 Grand Prix of Figure Skating Final

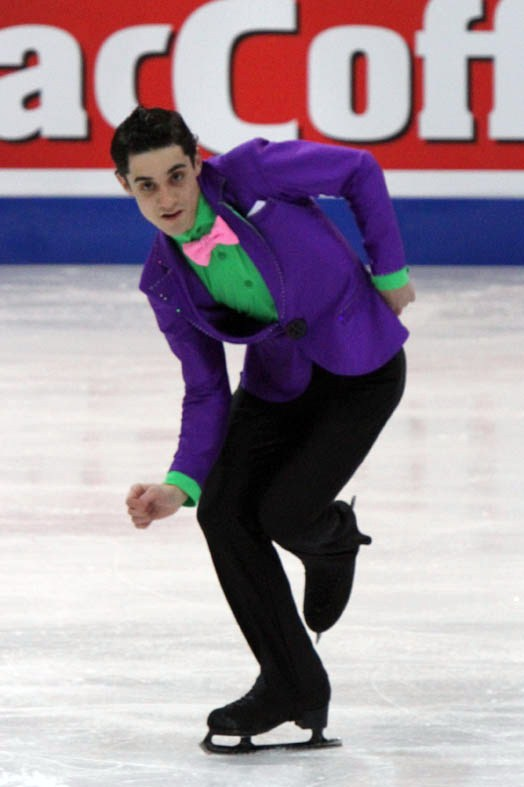
Fernández at the 2011 European Figure Skating Championships

=== Post-2019 ===
| Season | Free skating | Exhibition |
|---|---|---|
| 2019–2020 | Man of La Mancha by Joe Darion and Mitch Leigh choreo. by David Wilson | Señorita by Shawn Mendes, Camila Cabello skating with Celia Robledo; Mariposas by Taburete; Abril by Vanesa Martín; Break of Day by Edurne; Vas a quedarte by Aitana; Someone You Loved by Lewis Capaldi; Giant by Calvin Harris, Rag'n'Bone Man; Black Betty by Ram Jam choreo. by David Wilson with Jeffrey Buttle |

=== Pre-2019 ===
| Season | Short program | Free skating | Exhibition |
|---|---|---|---|
| 2018–2019 | Malagueña by Ernesto Lecuona performed by Paco de Lucía, Plácido Domingo choreo. by Antonio Najarro | Man of La Mancha by Joe Darion and Mitch Leigh choreo. by David Wilson | Prometo (Promise) by Pablo Alborán choreo. by David Wilson, Sandra Bezic; Smile (based on Modern Times) by Charlie Chaplin, John Turner, Geoffrey Parsons; Bullfighter (El torero): The Bullfighter's Song (La Virgen de la Macarena) by Bernardino Bautista Monterde; Toreador Song by Georges Bizet choreo. by Kenji Miyamoto, Takaya Usuda; Man of La Mancha by Joe Darion and Mitch Leigh choreo. by David Wilson |
| 2017–2018 | Modern Times by Charlie Chaplin choreo. by David Wilson | Man of La Mancha by Joe Darion and Mitch Leigh choreo. by David Wilson | Prometo (Promise) by Pablo Alborán choreo. by David Wilson, Sandra Bezic; Man of La Mancha by Joe Darion and Mitch Leigh choreo. by David Wilson; I Love Paris by Sam Butera and The Witnesses; Petit Fleur by Henri René and His Orchestra choreo. by David Wilson with Jeffrey Buttle; Aerobic Class (mix) choreo. by Kurt Browning, Geoffrey Tyler; Black Betty by Ram Jam choreo. by David Wilson with Jeffrey Buttle; Danny Boy by Frederic Weatherly performed by John McDermott choreo. by David Wilson |
| 2016–2017 | Malagueña by Ernesto Lecuona performed by Paco de Lucía, Plácido Domingo choreo. by Antonio Najarro | Elvis Presley medley; Trouble; Fever; Jailhouse Rock choreo. by David Wilson | Modern Times (the 2017–2018 short program) by Charlie Chaplin choreo. by David Wilson; Pirates of the Caribbean (not the 2009–2011 free skating); Touch of Evil by Henry Mancini choreo. by Kurt Browning, Geoffrey Tyler; Danny Boy by Frederic Weatherly performed by John McDermott choreo. by David Wilson |
| 2015–2016 | Malagueña by Ernesto Lecuona performed by Paco de Lucía, Plácido Domingo choreo. by Antonio Najarro | Guys and Dolls by Frank Loesser performed by Frank Sinatra choreo. by David Wilson | Luck Be a Lady (from the 2015–16 free skating) by Frank Loesser performed by Frank Sinatra choreo. by David Wilson; I Love Paris by Sam Butera and The Witnesses; Danny Boy by Frederic Weatherly performed by John McDermott choreo. by David Wilson; Black Betty by Ram Jam choreo. by David Wilson with Jeffrey Buttle; Heart Keeps Dancing by James Gruntz; Aerobic Class (mix) choreo. by Kurt Browning, Geoffrey Tyler; Bullfighter: The Bullfighter's Song (La Virgen de la Macarena) by Bernardino Bautista Monterde; Toreador Song by Georges Bizet choreo. by Kenji Miyamoto, Takaya Usuda |
| 2014–2015 | Black Betty by Ram Jam choreo. by David Wilson with Jeffrey Buttle | Il barbiere di Siviglia; Ouverture; Acto Laro al Factotum; Temporale by Gioachino Rossini choreo. by David Wilson | Bullfighter: The Bullfighter's Song (La Virgen de la Macarena) by Bernardino Bautista Monterde; Toreador Song by Georges Bizet choreo. by Kenji Miyamoto, Takaya Usuda; Touch of Evil by Henry Mancini choreo. by Kurt Browning, Geoffrey Tyler; Aerobic Class (Mix) choreo. by Kurt Browning, Geoffrey Tyler; 20 De Abril by Celtas Cortos; When I Was Your Man by Bruno Mars |
| 2013–2014 | Satan Takes a Holiday by Larry Clinton choreo. by David Wilson | Peter Gunn by Henry Mancini; Harlem Nocturne by Earle Hagen choreo. by David Wilson | Aerobic Class (mix) choreo. by Kurt Browning, Geoffrey Tyler; Satan Takes a Holiday by Larry Clinton |
| 2012–2013 | The Mask of Zorro by James Horner choreo. by David Wilson | Charlie Chaplin (medley) choreo. by David Wilson | Aerobic Class (Mix) choreo. by Kurt Browning, Geoffrey Tyler; The Lazy Song by Bruno Mars choreo. by Jeffrey Buttle |
| 2011–2012 | I Love Paris by Sam Butera and The Witnesses; Petit Fleur by Henri René and His Orchestra choreo. by David Wilson with Jeffrey Buttle | La traviata; I vespri siciliani; Nabucco; Rigoletto by Giuseppe Verdi choreo. by David Wilson | The Lazy Song by Bruno Mars choreo. by Jeffrey Buttle; La donna è mobile (from Rigoletto) by Giuseppe Verdi choreo. by David Wilson |
| 2010–2011 | Rhumba d'Amour; Nu, pogodi! (Russian cartoon) | Pirates of the Caribbean by Klaus Badelt, Hans Zimmer | |
| 2009–2010 | (at Worlds): The Matrix by Don Davis; (at Olympics): James Bond (medley); (at Europeans): The Mexican | Pirates of the Caribbean by Klaus Badelt, Hans Zimmer | |
| 2008–2009 | Entre dos aguas by Paco de Lucía | The Matrix by Don Davis; Romeo and Juliet (soundtrack) | I Like The Way (You Move) by BodyRockers |
| 2007–2008 | Requiem for a Dream by Clint Mansell | The Mission by Ennio Morricone | |
| 2006–2007 | Dragon: The Bruce Lee Story by Randy Edelman | The Godfather by Nino Rota performed by Edvin Marton | |

== Competitive highlights ==
- GP – Event of the ISU Grand Prix Series
- JGP – Event of the ISU Junior Grand Prix Series
- CS – Event of the ISU Challenger Series
- WD – Withdrew from competition
- Medals at team events are awarded for the team result only. Individual placements at team events are listed in parentheses.

Competition placements at senior level
| Season | 2006–07 | 2007–08 | 2008–09 | 2009–10 | 2010–11 | 2011–12 | 2012–13 | 2013–14 | 2014–15 | 2015–16 | 2016–17 | 2017–18 | 2018–19 | 2019–20 |
|---|---|---|---|---|---|---|---|---|---|---|---|---|---|---|
| Winter Olympics | | | | 14th | | | | 4th | | | | 3rd | | |
| World Championships | 35th | 30th | 19th | 12th | 10th | 9th | 3rd | 3rd | 1st | 1st | 4th | WD | | |
| European Championships | 28th | 17th | 11th | 8th | 9th | 6th | 1st | 1st | 1st | 1st | 1st | 1st | 1st | |
| Grand Prix Final | | | | | | 3rd | 4th | | 2nd | 2nd | 4th | | | |
| Spanish Championships | | | | 1st | 2nd | 1st | 1st | 1st | 1st | 1st | 1st | 1st | | |
| GP Cup of China | | | | | | | | | | 1st | | 6th | | |
| GP France | | | | 11th | | | | | | | 1st | 1st | | |
| GP NHK Trophy | | | | | | | 4th | 5th | | | | | | |
| GP Rostelecom Cup | | | | | 9th | 2nd | | 3rd | 1st | 1st | 1st | | | |
| GP Skate Canada | | | | | 5th | 2nd | 1st | | 2nd | | | | | |
| CS Autumn Classic | | | | | | | | | | | | 1st | | |
| Cup of Nice | | | | 3rd | 5th | | | | | | | | | |
| Finlandia Trophy | | | | | | | 3rd | | | | | | | |
| Golden Spin of Zagreb | | 13th | | | | | | | | | | | | |
| Japan Open | | | | | | | | 3rd (1st) | 1st (2nd) | 3rd (2nd) | 2nd (2nd) | 1st (1st) | 2nd (3rd) | 1st (5th) |
| Merano Cup | | | | 1st | | | | | | | | | | |
| Nebelhorn Trophy | | | | | | 4th | | | | | | | | |
| NRW Trophy | | | 3rd | | | | | | | | | | | |

Competition placements at junior level
| Season | 2005–06 | 2006–07 | 2007–08 | 2008–09 |
|---|---|---|---|---|
| World Junior Championships | | | 13th | |
| Spanish Championships | 2nd | 1st | 1st | 1st |
| JGP Estonia | | | 9th | |
| JGP Great Britain | | | 11th | |
| JGP Mexico | | | | 6th |
| JGP Netherlands | | 23rd | | |
| JGP Spain | | | | 4th |
| European Youth Olympic Festival | | 4th | | |
| Gardena Spring Trophy | | 5th | | |

== Detailed results ==
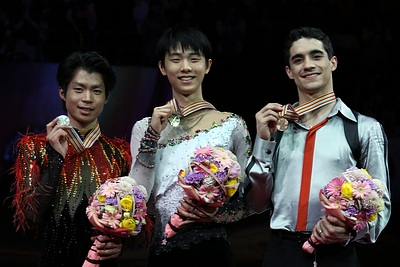
Fernández at the 2014 World Championships podium

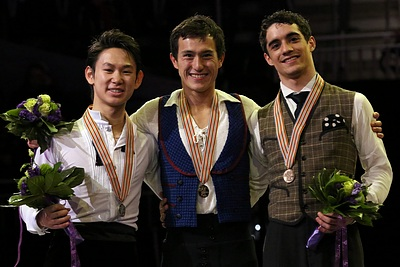
Fernández and his fellow medalists at the 2013 World Championships

Small medals for short program and free skating awarded only at ISU Championships.

2019–20 season
| Date | Event | SP | FS | Total |
|---|---|---|---|---|
| 5 October 2019 | 2019 Japan Open | – | 5; 153.14 | 1T |
2018–19 season
| Date | Event | SP | FS | Total |
| 21–27 January 2019 | 2019 European Championships | 3; 91.84 | 1; 179.75 | 1; 271.59 |
| 6 October 2018 | 2018 Japan Open | – | 3; 157.86 | 2T |
2017–18 season
| Date | Event | SP | FS | Total |
| 16–17 February 2018 | 2018 Winter Olympics | 2; 107.58 | 4; 197.66 | 3; 305.24 |
| 15–21 January 2018 | 2018 European Championships | 1; 103.82 | 1; 191.73 | 1; 295.55 |
| 15–17 December 2017 | 2018 Spanish Championships | 1; 107.73 | 1; 180.57 | 1; 288.30 |
| 17–19 November 2017 | 2017 Internationaux de France | 1; 107.86 | 2; 175.85 | 1; 283.71 |
| 3–5 November 2017 | 2017 Cup of China | 3; 90.57 | 6; 162.49 | 6; 253.06 |
| 7 October 2017 | 2017 Japan Open | – | 1; 189.47 | 1T |
| 20–23 September 2017 | 2017 CS Autumn Classic International | 2; 101.20 | 1; 177.87 | 1; 279.07 |
2016–17 season
| Date | Event | SP | FS | Total |
| 29 March – 2 April 2017 | 2017 World Championships | 1; 109.05 | 6; 192.14 | 4; 301.19 |
| 25–29 January 2017 | 2017 European Championships | 1; 104.25 | 1; 190.59 | 1; 294.84 |
| 16–18 December 2016 | 2017 Spanish Championships | 1; 99.39 | 1; 201.56 | 1; 300.95 |
| 8–11 December 2016 | 2016–17 Grand Prix Final | 3; 91.76 | 4; 177.01 | 4; 268.77 |
| 11–13 November 2016 | 2016 Trophée de France | 1; 96.57 | 1; 188.81 | 1; 285.38 |
| 4–6 November 2016 | 2016 Rostelecom Cup | 2; 91.55 | 1; 201.43 | 1; 292.98 |
| 1 October 2016 | 2016 Japan Open | – | 2; 192.20 | 2T |
2015–16 season
| Date | Event | SP | FS | Total |
| 28 March – 3 April 2016 | 2016 World Championships | 2; 98.52 | 1; 216.41 | 1; 314.93 |
| 27–31 January 2016 | 2016 European Championships | 1; 102.54 | 1; 200.23 | 1; 302.77 |
| 18–20 December 2015 | 2016 Spanish Championships | 1; 104.68 | 1; 190.69 | 1; 295.37 |
| 10–13 December 2015 | 2015–16 Grand Prix Final | 2; 91.52 | 2; 201.43 | 2; 292.95 |
| 20–22 November 2015 | 2015 Rostelecom Cup | 2; 86.99 | 1; 184.44 | 1; 271.43 |
| 5–8 November 2015 | 2015 Cup of China | 1; 93.19 | 1; 177.36 | 1; 270.55 |
| 3 October 2015 | 2015 Japan Open | – | 2; 176.24 | 3T |
2014–15 season
| Date | Event | SP | FS | Total |
| 23–29 March 2015 | 2015 World Championships | 2; 92.74 | 2; 181.16 | 1; 273.90 |
| 26 January – 1 February 2015 | 2015 European Championships | 1; 89.24 | 1; 173.25 | 1; 262.49 |
| 19–21 December 2014 | 2015 Spanish Championships | 1; 87.06 | 1; 168.05 | 1; 255.11 |
| 11–14 December 2014 | 2014–15 Grand Prix Final | 5; 79.18 | 2; 174.72 | 2; 253.90 |
| 14–16 November 2014 | 2014 Rostelecom Cup | 1; 93.92 | 1; 171.09 | 1; 265.01 |
| 31 October – 2 November 2014 | 2014 Skate Canada International | 1; 86.36 | 2; 158.51 | 2; 244.87 |
| 4 October 2014 | 2014 Japan Open | – | 2; 155.46 | 1T |
2013–14 season
| Date | Event | SP | FS | Total |
| 26–29 March 2014 | 2014 World Championships | 2; 96.42 | 3; 179.51 | 3; 275.93 |
| 13–14 February 2014 | 2014 Winter Olympics | 3; 86.98 | 5; 166.94 | 4; 253.92 |
| 13–19 January 2014 | 2014 European Championships | 1; 91.56 | 1; 175.55 | 1; 267.11 |
| 21–22 December 2013 | 2014 Spanish Championships | 1; 97.91 | 1; 187.66 | 1; 285.57 |
| 22–24 November 2013 | 2013 Rostelecom Cup | 3; 81.87 | 5; 145.12 | 3; 226.99 |
| 8–10 November 2013 | 2013 NHK Trophy | 2; 84.78 | 8; 145.67 | 5; 230.45 |
| 5 October 2013 | 2013 Japan Open | – | 1; 176.91 | 3T |
2012–13 season
| Date | Event | SP | FS | Total |
| 10–17 March 2013 | 2013 World Championships | 7; 80.76 | 4; 168.30 | 3; 249.06 |
| 23–27 January 2013 | 2013 European Championships | 2; 88.80 | 1; 186.07 | 1; 274.87 |
| 14–16 December 2012 | 2013 Spanish Championships | 1; 79.02 | 1; 149.76 | 1; 228.78 |
| 6–9 December 2012 | 2012 Grand Prix Final | 5; 80.19 | 1; 178.43 | 4; 258.62 |
| 23–25 November 2012 | 2012 NHK Trophy | 3; 86.23 | 5; 146.55 | 4; 232.78 |
| 26–28 October 2012 | 2012 Skate Canada International | 1; 85.87 | 1; 168.07 | 1; 253.94 |
| 5–7 October 2012 | 2012 Finlandia Trophy | 1; 80.77 | 3; 154.43 | 3; 235.20 |
2011–12 season
| Date | Event | SP | FS | Total |
| 26 March – 1 April 2012 | 2012 World Championships | 5; 81.87 | 14; 144.00 | 9; 225.97 |
| 7–12 February 2012 | 2012 European Championships | 4; 80.1 | 7; 142.15 | 6; 222.26 |
| 22–26 December 2011 | 2012 Spanish Championships | 1; 63.68 | 1; 154.06 | 1; 217.74 |
| 8–11 December 2011 | 2011 Grand Prix Final | 3; 81.26 | 4; 166.29 | 3; 247.55 |
| 25–27 November 2011 | 2011 Rostelecom Cup | 4; 78.50 | 1; 163.13 | 2; 241.63 |
| 27–30 October 2011 | 2011 Skate Canada International | 1; 84.71 | 2; 165.62 | 2; 250.33 |
| 21–24 September 2011 | 2011 Nebelhorn Trophy | 6; 66.87 | 4; 137.59 | 4; 204.46 |
2010–11 season
| Date | Event | SP | FS | Total |
| 24 April – 1 May 2011 | 2011 World Championships | 14; 69.16 | 10; 149.10 | 10; 218.26 |
| 24–30 January 2011 | 2011 European Championships | 11; 60.48 | 7; 139.17 | 9; 199.65 |
| 24–27 December 2010 | 2011 Spanish Championships | 1; 71.50 | 2; 120.63 | 2; 192.13 |
| 19–21 November 2010 | 2010 Cup of Russia | 8; 66.46 | 10; 117.60 | 9; 184.06 |
| 29–31 October 2010 | 2010 Skate Canada International | 6; 66.74 | 4; 144.11 | 5; 210.85 |
| 13–17 October 2010 | 2010 Cup of Nice | 6; 66.88 | 4; 132.43 | 5; 199.31 |
2009–10 season
| Date | Event | SP | FS | Total |
| 22–28 March 2010 | 2010 World Championships | 13; 71.65 | 10; 144.01 | 12; 215.66 |
| 14–27 February 2010 | 2010 Winter Olympic Games | 16; 68.69 | 10; 137.99 | 14; 206.68 |
| 18–24 January 2010 | 2010 European Championships | 13; 66.50 | 6; 138.33 | 8; 204.83 |
| 12–13 December 2009 | 2010 Spanish Championships | 1; 65.55 | 1; 119.59 | 1; 185.14 |
| 4–8 November 2009 | 2009 Cup of Nice | 11; 53.75 | 1; 130.58 | 3; 184.33 |
| 16–17 October 2009 | 2009 Trophée Éric Bompard | 10; 60.56 | 11; 109.60 | 11; 170.16 |
2008–09 season
| Date | Event | SP | FS | Total |
| 24–28 March 2009 | 2009 World Championships | 20; 63.75 | 19; 119.80 | 19; 193.55 |
| 20–24 January 2009 | 2009 European Championships | 12; 65.75 | 11; 117.16 | 11; 182.91 |
| December 2008 | 2009 Spanish Junior Championships | 1 | 1 | 1 |
| 4–7 December 2008 | 2008 NRW Trophy | 3 | 5 | 3; 190.69 |
| 25–28 September 2008 | 2008 JGP Spain | 10; 45.20 | 3; 111.98 | 4; 157.18 |
| 25–28 September 2008 | 2008 JGP Mexico | 4; 54.57 | 8; 92.78 | 6; 147.35 |
2007–08 season
| Date | Event | SP | FS | Total |
| 17–23 March 2008 | 2008 World Championships | 30; 47.87 | – | – |
| 25 February – 2 March 2008 | 2008 World Junior Championships | 14; 52.25 | 11; 108.76 | 13; 161.01 |
| 22–27 January 2008 | 2008 European Championships | 16; 51.94 | 17; 102.16 | 17; 154.10 |
| December 2007 | 2008 Spanish Junior Championships | 1 | 1 | 1 |
| 8–11 November 2007 | 2007 Golden Spin | 12 | 12 | 13; 145.72 |
| 20–22 September 2007 | 2007 JGP Estonia | 9; 46.18 | 9; 93.24 | 9; 139.42 |
| 5–7 October 2007 | 2007 JGP Great Britain | 9; 49.81 | 10; 97.82 | 11; 147.63 |
2006–07 season
| Date | Event | SP | FS | Total |
| 19–25 March 2007 | 2007 World Championships | 35; 41.57 | DNQ | – |
| 22–28 January 2007 | 2007 European Championships | 28; 41.73 | DNQ | – |
| December 2006 | 2007 Spanish Junior Championships | 1 | 1 | 1 |
| 5–6 October 2006 | 2006 JGP Netherlands | 18; 37.38 | 24; 51.46 | 23; 88.84 |

Olympic Games
| Preceded by Queralt Castellet | Flagbearer for Spain; 2014 Sochi | Succeeded by Lucas Eguibar |
