= Matthew Parr (figure skater) =

English figure skater

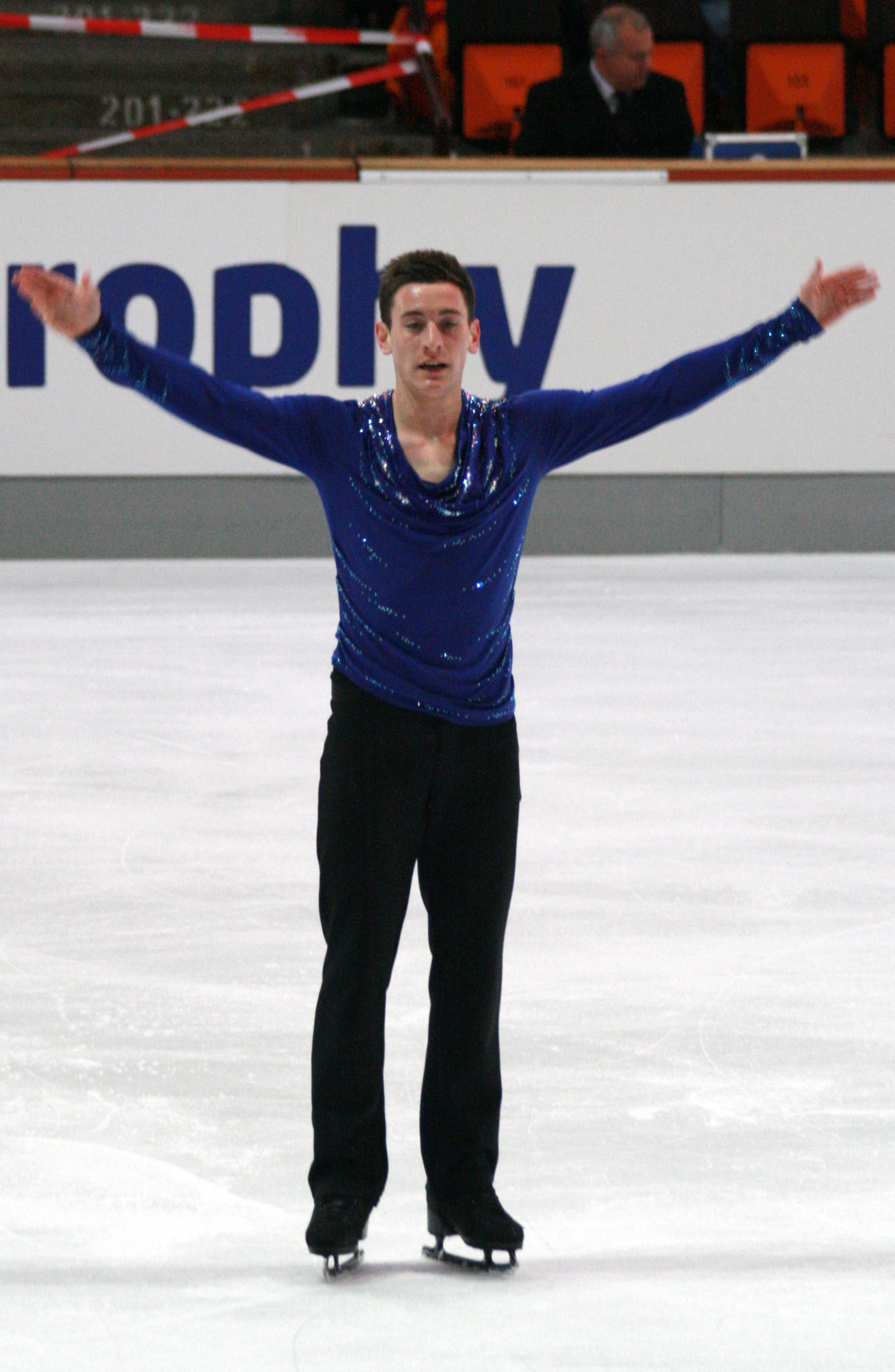

Personal information
- Born: 1 March 1990 (age 36) North Shields, England, United Kingdom
- Height: 1.80 m (5 ft 11 in)

Figure skating career
- Country: United Kingdom
- Began skating: 1997
- Retired: 10 April 2014

Matthew Parr (born 1 March 1990) is an English former competitive figure skater. He is a four-time British national champion (2009–10, 2013–14).

He currently plays football for the Sheffield division of Football for Foodbanks.

== Career ==
Parr began competing on the ISU Junior Grand Prix series in 2004. He made his senior international debut at the 2008 Golden Spin of Zagreb.

Following the 2009 European Championships, Parr was named as the British entry for the 2009 World Championships, replacing Elliot Hilton, but Hilton won a lawsuit against the National Ice Skating Association and was restored to the team.

Parr competed at the 2009 World Junior Championships in Sofia, the 2010 European Championships in Tallinn, and 2010 World Championships in Turin. The Nebelhorn Trophy in September 2013 was the final qualification opportunity for countries which had not yet earned spots in individual Olympic figure skating events. Placing 25th, Parr was unsuccessful in his bid for an individual berth - missing out by one place. In January 2014, he placed 27th at the 2014 European Championships in Budapest.

Parr was selected to compete at the 2014 Winter Olympics, held in February in Sochi, Russia, due to the United Kingdom's qualification for the team figure skating event. On the first day of the Olympics, he placed ninth out of ten skaters in the men's short program, earning two points for the UK. His country did not advance further.

Parr retired from competition following the Olympic Games in February 2014.

== Programs ==
Season	Short Program	Free Skating
2013–2014	Farruca y Rumba by Pepe Romero	Who Wants To Live Forever by Queen, Brian May
2009–2010	Moonlight Sonata by Ludwig van Beethoven	Conquest of Paradise by Vangelis
2008–2009	El Mariachi by Robert Rodriguez; "Don't Let Me Be Misunderstood" by Santa Esmeralda	Band of Brothers by Michael Kamen
2007–2008	Feeling Good by Anthony Newley, Leslie Bricusse	Band of Brothers by Michael Kamen

== Competitive highlights ==
International
Event	03–04	04–05	05–06	06–07	07–08	08–09	09–10	10–11	11–12	12–13	13–14
World Championships							30th				
European Championships							27th				27th
Cup of Nice							16th	18th			15th
Golden Spin of Zagreb						15th					
Ice Challenge										14th	
Nebelhorn Trophy							17th	15th			25th
NRW Trophy								12th		24th	
Volvo Open Cup											8th
International: Junior
World Junior Championships						29th					
JGP Austria					12th						
JGP Italy						25th					
JGP Norway				16th							
JGP Romania				11th							
JGP Great Britain					16th	13th					
JGP Ukraine		18th									
Triglav Trophy	6th J.										
Merano Cup	1st J.										
National
British Championships	1st J.	2nd J.	3rd J.	4th		1st	1st	2nd		1st	1st
Team events
Olympics											10th
