= Iceberg Skating Palace =

Arena in Sochi, Russia

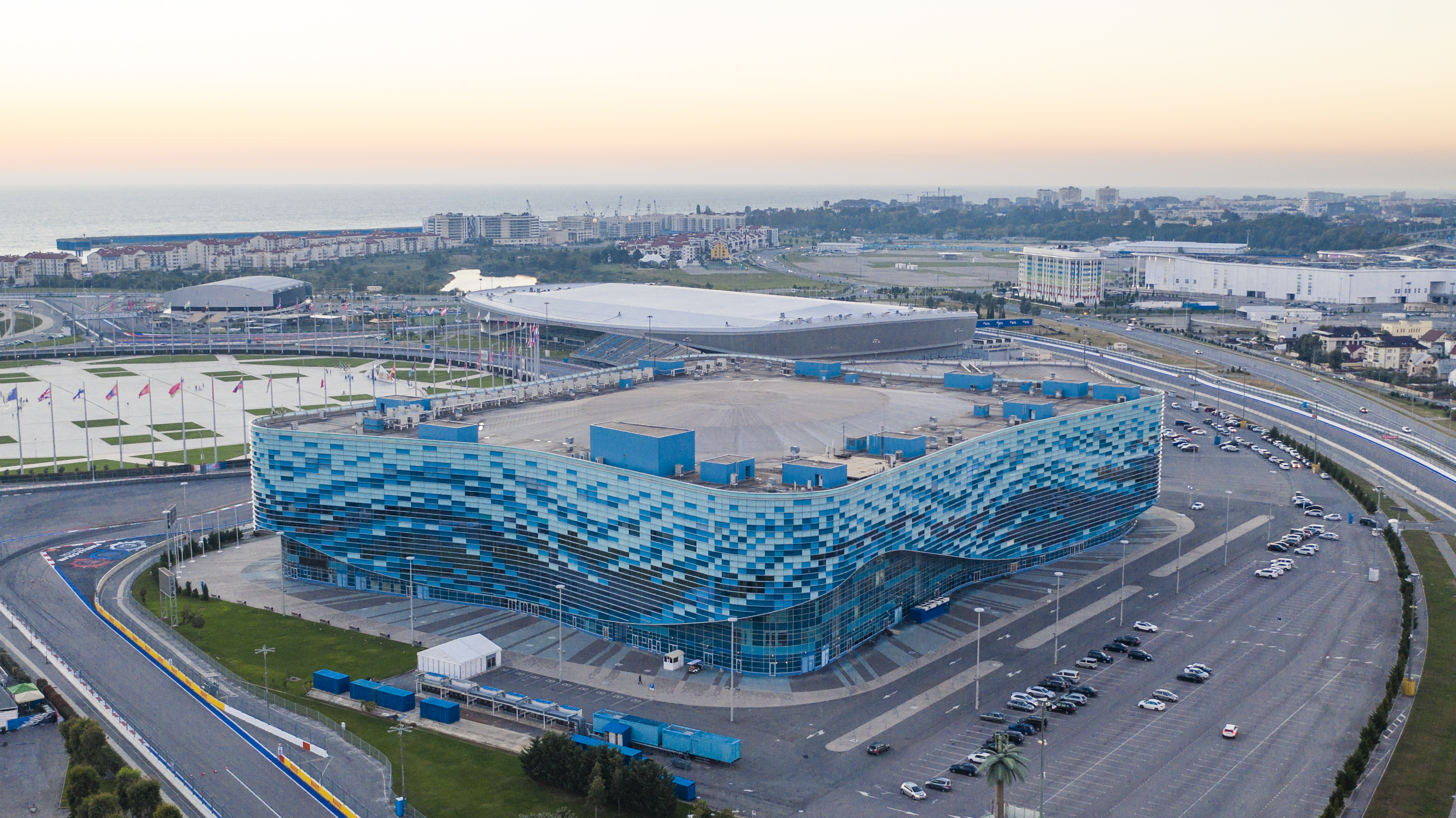
- Interactive map of Iceberg Skating Palace
- Location: Sochi, Russia
- Coordinates: 43°24′27″N 39°57′30″E
- Capacity: 12,000

Construction
- Opened: 2012

Tenants
- 2014 Winter Olympics (short track speed skating and figure skating)

The Iceberg Skating Palace (Russian: Дворец Зимнего Спорта Айсберг) is a 12,000-seat multi-purpose arena at Sochi Olympic Park in Sochi, Russia. The venue hosted the figure skating and short track speed skating events at the 2014 Winter Olympics. It cost $43.9 million, including the temporary works for the Olympics. 15,000 tonnes of steel were used. The environment was taken into consideration in its construction.

A local figure skating competition was held in October 2012 but the International Skating Union said more work was needed to be ready for the 2012–2013 Grand Prix of Figure Skating Final, a test event in December 2012. At the Grand Prix Final, competitors said they liked the venue but some spectators complained about handrails obstructing the view in the upper tier. It takes about two hours to adjust the ice when switching from figure skating to short track or vice versa.

Plans had originally existed for the arena to converted into a cycling velodrome following the Olympics.

== See also ==
- List of indoor arenas in Russia
