= 2014 German Figure Skating Championships =

- Type: National Championship
- Date: December 14 – 15, 2013
- Season: 2013–14
- Location: Berlin
- Venue: Erika-Hess-Eisstadion
- Previous: 2013 German Championships
- Next: 2015 German Championships

The 2014 German Figure Skating Championships (German: Deutsche Meisterschaften im Eiskunstlaufen 2014) was held on December 14–15, 2013 at the Erika-Hess-Eisstadion in Berlin. Medals were awarded in the disciplines of men's singles, women's singles, pair skating, and ice dance on the senior, junior, and novice levels. The results were among the criteria used to choose the German teams to the 2014 Winter Olympics, 2014 World Championships, and 2014 European Championships.

== Medalists ==
=== Senior ===
Discipline	Gold	Silver	Bronze
Men	Peter Liebers	Franz Streubel	Paul Fentz
Ladies	Nathalie Weinzierl	Sarah Hecken	Nicole Schott
Pairs	Aliona Savchenko / Robin Szolkowy	Maylin Wende / Daniel Wende	Mari Vartmann / Aaron Van Cleave
Ice dancing	Nelli Zhiganshina / Alexander Gazsi	Tanja Kolbe / Stefano Caruso	No other competitors

=== Junior ===
Discipline	Gold	Silver	Bronze
Men	Panagiotis Polizoakis	Alexander Bjelde	Anton Kempf
Ladies	Lutricia Bock	Maria-Katharina Herceg	Alissa Scheidt
Pairs	Julia Linckh / Konrad Hocker-Scholler	None	
Ice dancing	Polina Gorlov / Eduard Vishnyakov	Loreen Geiler / Sven Miersch	Leah-Magdalena Steffan / Benjamin Steffan

== Senior results ==
=== Men ===
Rank	Name	Total points	SP		FS	
1	Peter Liebers	227.84	1	81.76	1	146.08
2	Franz Streubel	197.83	3	64.67	2	133.16
3	Paul Fentz	190.00	2	67.45	3	122.55
4	Christopher Berneck	180.87	4	60.35	4	120.52
5	Martin Rappe	173.19	5	54.72	5	118.47
6	Matthias Hechler	126.26	6	48.23	6	78.03

=== Ladies ===
Rank	Name	Total points	SP		FS	
1	Nathalie Weinzierl	175.31	1	60.83	1	114.48
2	Sarah Hecken	148.06	4	47.56	2	100.50
3	Nicole Schott	145.48	5	47.36	3	98.12
4	Sandy Hoffmann	142.39	2	58.43	5	83.96
5	Jennifer Parker	132.55	3	48.50	4	84.05
6	Jennifer Urban	128.27	6	44.81	6	83.46
7	Anne Zetzsche	127.95	7	44.61	7	83.34
8	Anneli Kawelke	124.37	8	44.08	8	80.29
9	Minami Dobashi	104.34	9	35.10	9	69.24
10	Luisa Weber	96.73	10	34.27	10	62.46
11	Jessica Füssinger	88.03	11	31.39	11	56.64

=== Pairs ===
Annabelle Prölß & Ruben Blommaert and Shari Koch & Christian Nüchtern withdrew from the event.

Rank	Name	Total points	SP		FS	
1	Aliona Savchenko / Robin Szolkowy	215.72	1	76.29	1	139.43
2	Maylin Wende / Daniel Wende	172.42	3	59.96	2	112.46
3	Mari Vartmann / Aaron Van Cleave	168.45	2	60.42	3	108.03

=== Ice dancing ===
Rank	Name	Total points	SD		FD	
1	Nelli Zhiganshina / Alexander Gazsi	149.41	1	62.25	2	87.16
2	Tanja Kolbe / Stefano Caruso	145.26	2	57.41	1	87.85

== International team selections ==
=== Winter Olympics ===
Skaters nominated for the 2014 Winter Olympics:

	Men	Ladies	Pairs	Ice dancing
1				
2				
3				
1st alt.				
2nd alt.				
3rd alt.				

	Men	Ladies	Pairs	Ice dancing
Team				

=== World Championships ===
Skaters nominated for the 2014 World Championships:

	Men	Ladies	Pairs	Ice dancing
1				
2				
3				
1st alt.				
2nd alt.				
3rd alt.				

=== European Championships ===
Skaters nominated for the 2014 European Championships:

	Men	Ladies	Pairs	Ice dancing
1	Peter Liebers	Nathalie Weinzierl	Aljona Savchenko / Robin Szolkowy	Nelli Zhiganshina / Alexander Gazsi
2	Franz Streubel	Sarah Hecken	Maylin Wende / Daniel Wende	Tanja Kolbe / Stefano Caruso
3	–	–	Mari Vartmann / Aaron Van Cleave	–

=== World Junior Championships ===
Skaters nominated for the 2014 World Junior Championships:

	Men	Ladies	Pairs	Ice dancing
1	Alexander Bjelde	Lutricia Bock	Julia Linckh / Konrad Hocker-Scholler	Florence Clarke / Tim Dieck
2	–	Maria-Katharina Herceg	–	Ria Schiffner / Julian Salatzki
1st alt.	Panagiotis Polizoakis	Nicole Schott	–	Loreen Geiler / Sven Miersch
2nd alt.	–	Minami Hanashiro	–	Leah Steffan / Benjamin Steffan
