= 2014 Rostelecom Cup =

- Type: Grand Prix
- Date: November 14 – 16
- Season: 2014–15
- Location: Moscow
- Host: Figure Skating Federation of Russia
- Venue: Luzhniki Small Sports Arena

Champions
- Men's singles: (Spain) Javier Fernández
- Ladies' singles: (Japan) Rika Hongo
- Pairs: (Russia) Ksenia Stolbova / Fedor Klimov
- Ice dance: (United States) Madison Chock / Evan Bates
- Previous: 2013 Rostelecom Cup
- Next: 2015 Rostelecom Cup
- Previous Grand Prix: 2014 Cup of China
- Next Grand Prix: 2014 Trophée Éric Bompard

The 2014 Rostelecom Cup was the fourth event of six in the 2014–15 ISU Grand Prix of Figure Skating, a senior-level international invitational competition series. It was held at the Luzhniki Small Sports Arena in Moscow on November 14–16. Medals were awarded in the disciplines of men's singles, ladies' singles, pair skating, and ice dancing. Skaters earned points toward qualifying for the 2014–15 Grand Prix Final.

== Entries ==
The entries were as follows:

Country	Men	Ladies	Pairs	Ice dancing
Canada	Jeremy Ten	Alaine Chartrand		
Czech Republic	Michal Březina	Eliška Březinová		
Germany			Annabelle Prolss / Ruben Blommaert	
United Kingdom				Penny Coomes / Nicholas Buckland
Italy	Ivan Righini			
Japan	Takahiko Kozuka	Rika Hongo; Miyabi Oba	Narumi Takahashi / Ryuichi Kihara	
South Korea		Park So-Youn		Rebeka Kim / Kirill Minov
Russia	Artur Gachinski; Moris Kvitelashvili; Sergei Voronov	Maria Artemieva; Anna Pogorilaya; Maria Stavitskaia	Kristina Astakhova / Alexei Rogonov; Ksenia Stolbova / Fedor Klimov; Evgenia Tarasova / Vladimir Morozov	Elena Ilinykh / Ruslan Zhiganshin; Victoria Sinitsina / Nikita Katsalapov; Alexandra Stepanova / Ivan Bukin
Spain	Javier Fernández			
Sweden		Joshi Helgesson		
United States	Max Aaron; Jason Brown; Stephen Carriere	Ashley Cain; Mirai Nagasu; Angela Wang	Jessica Calalang / Zack Sidhu; Haven Denney / Brandon Frazier; DeeDee Leng / Simon Shnapir	Alexandra Aldridge / Daniel Eaton; Madison Chock / Evan Bates; Kaitlin Hawayek / Jean-Luc Baker
Uzbekistan	Misha Ge			

=== Changes to initial lineup ===
- On July 2, it was announced that Stefania Berton / Ondrej Hotarek had split up. On August 4, their replacement was announced as Annabelle Prolss / Ruben Blommaert.
- On July 10, Vanessa Lam was removed from the roster. No reason was given. On July 15, it was announced that Ashley Cain had been named as her replacement.
- On August 13, Maylin Wende / Daniel Wende were removed from the roster due to an injury to Daniel. On August 29, Narumi Takahashi / Ryuichi Kihara were announced as replacements.
- On August 29, Artur Gachinski, Nikol Gosviani and Evgenia Tarasova / Vladimir Morozov were announced as host picks.
- On September 8, Valentina Marchei was removed from the roster due to an injury. On September 17, Rika Hongo was announced as her replacement.
- On October 2, Julia Zlobina / Alexei Sitnikov withdrew. No reason has been given. On October 7, Rebeka Kim / Kirill Minov were announced as their replacements.
- On October 14, Nikol Gosviani was replaced by Maria Artemieva. No reason has been given.
- On October 17, Tarah Kayne / Daniel O'Shea were removed from the roster due to lack of training time. On October 24, Jessica Calalang / Zack Sidhu were announced as their replacements.
- On October 28, Nathalie Weinzierl was removed from the roster due to an injury. On October 30, Eliška Březinová was announced as her replacement.
- On November 5, Alexander Majorov was removed from the roster. On November 11, Misha Ge was announced as his replacement.
- On November 7, there were a few substitutions to the roster. Adelina Sotnikova and Mikhail Kolyada withdrew due to an injury. Vasilisa Davankova / Alexander Enbert withdrew to due health problems. They were replaced by Maria Stavitskaya, Moris Kvitelashvili, and Kristina Astakhova / Alexei Rogonov respectively.

== Results ==
=== Men ===
Rank	Name	Nation	Total points	SP		FS	
1	Javier Fernández	Spain	265.01	1	93.92	1	171.09
2	Sergei Voronov	Russia	252.00	2	90.33	2	161.67
3	Michal Březina	Czech Republic	241.23	4	80.89	3	160.34
4	Misha Ge	Uzbekistan	238.05	5	79.69	5	158.36
5	Jason Brown	United States	235.56	7	76.32	4	159.24
6	Takahiko Kozuka	Japan	216.80	3	81.38	7	135.42
7	Max Aaron	United States	212.60	6	77.09	6	135.51
8	Artur Gachinski	Russia	201.26	8	74.13	9	127.13
9	Stephen Carriere	United States	201.24	10	72.20	8	129.04
10	Jeremy Ten	Canada	198.50	9	73.91	11	124.59
11	Ivan Righini	Italy	195.07	11	69.74	10	125.33
12	Moris Kvitelashvili	Russia	174.25	12	62.24	12	112.01

=== Ladies ===
Rank	Name	Nation	Total points	SP		FS	
1	Rika Hongo	Japan	178.00	2	59.85	1	118.15
2	Anna Pogorilaya	Russia	173.43	3	59.32	2	114.11
3	Alaine Chartrand	Canada	172.00	1	61.18	3	110.82
4	Mirai Nagasu	United States	165.88	4	58.90	6	106.98
5	Park So-youn	South Korea	163.24	7	53.71	4	109.53
6	Miyabi Oba	Japan	154.57	10	46.76	5	107.81
7	Maria Stavitskaia	Russia	153.49	6	54.78	8	98.71
8	Ashley Cain	United States	150.90	5	57.18	9	93.72
9	Angela Wang	United States	150.75	9	51.25	7	99.50
10	Maria Artemieva	Russia	144.72	8	51.88	10	92.84
11	Eliška Březinová	Czech Republic	134.04	11	46.64	11	87.40
—	Joshi Helgesson	Sweden	withdrew	12	44.00	withdrew from competition	

=== Pairs ===
Rank	Name	Nation	Total points	SP		FS	
1	Ksenia Stolbova / Fedor Klimov	Russia	211.97	1	69.09	1	142.88
2	Evgenia Tarasova / Vladimir Morozov	Russia	173.78	2	67.28	5	106.50
3	Kristina Astakhova / Alexei Rogonov	Russia	164.86	3	58.34	4	106.52
4	Haven Denney / Brandon Frazier	United States	164.85	4	54.06	2	110.79
5	Jessica Calalang / Zack Sidhu	United States	157.45	5	50.87	3	106.58
6	Annabelle Prölß / Ruben Blommaert	Germany	145.16	6	48.69	6	96.47
7	Narumi Takahashi / Ryuichi Kihara	Japan	132.60	7	47.68	7	84.92
8	DeeDee Leng / Simon Shnapir	United States	128.68	8	45.42	8	83.26

=== Ice dancing ===
Rank	Name	Nation	Total points	SD		FD	
1	Madison Chock / Evan Bates	United States	174.28	1	68.86	1	105.42
2	Elena Ilinykh / Ruslan Zhiganshin	Russia	160.43	2	64.12	3	96.31
3	Penny Coomes / Nicholas Buckland	United Kingdom	158.02	3	59.55	2	98.47
4	Victoria Sinitsina / Nikita Katsalapov	Russia	147.55	4	57.96	4	89.59
5	Alexandra Stepanova / Ivan Bukin	Russia	143.51	5	56.90	5	86.61
6	Kaitlin Hawayek / Jean-Luc Baker	United States	136.33	7	52.86	6	83.47
7	Alexandra Aldridge / Daniel Eaton	United States	133.38	6	54.39	7	78.99
8	Rebeka Kim / Kirill Minov	South Korea	118.27	8	46.14	8	72.13
