= 2013 German Figure Skating Championships =

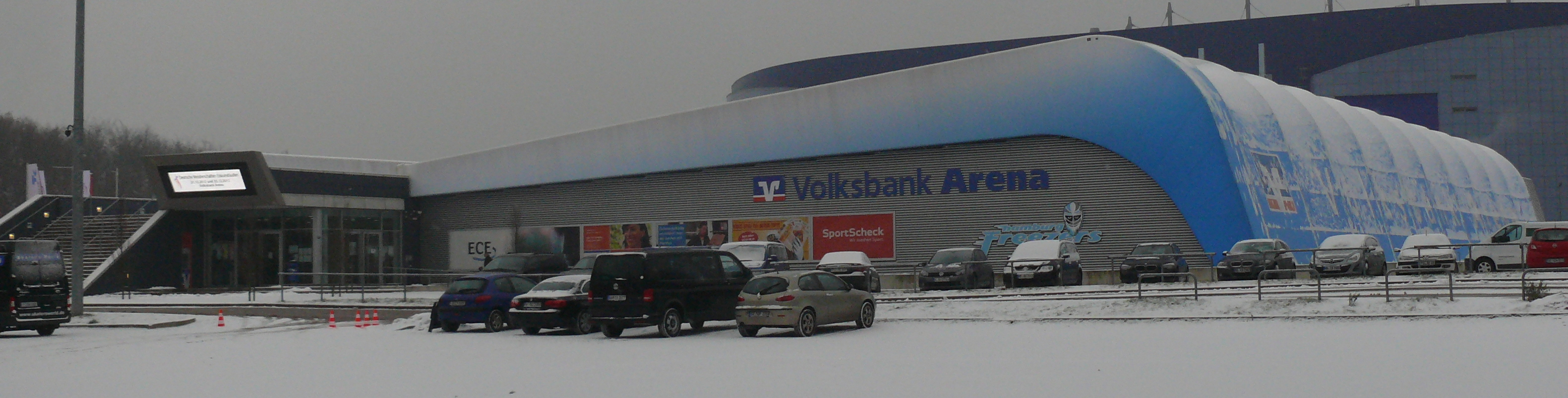
- Type: National Championship
- Date: December 21 – 22, 2012
- Season: 2012–13
- Location: Hamburg
- Venue: Volksbank Arena
- Previous: 2012 German Championships
- Next: 2014 German Championships

The 2013 German Figure Skating Championships (German: Deutsche Meisterschaften im Eiskunstlaufen 2013) was held on December 21–22, 2012 at the Volksbank Arena in Hamburg. Medals were awarded in the disciplines of men's singles, women's singles, pair skating, and ice dance at the senior, junior, and novice levels. The results are among the criteria used to choose the German teams to the 2013 World Championships and 2013 European Championships.

== Medalists ==
=== Senior ===
Discipline	Gold	Silver	Bronze
Men	Peter Liebers	Franz Streubel	Paul Fentz
Ladies	Sarah Hecken	Nathalie Weinzierl	Sandy Hoffmann
Pairs	Annabelle Prölß / Ruben Blommaert	Mari Vartmann / Aaron Van Cleave	No other competitors
Ice dancing	Nelli Zhiganshina / Alexander Gazsi	Tanja Kolbe / Stefano Caruso	Kavita Lorenz / Evgeni Kholoniuk

=== Junior ===
Discipline	Gold	Silver	Bronze
Men	Panagiotis Polizoakis	Alexander Bjelde	Anton Kempf
Ladies	Lutricia Bock	Annabelle Prölß	Natalia Fartushina
Pairs	Vanessa Bauer / Nolan Seegert	Julia Linckh / Konrad Hocker-Scholler	Christin Schotte / Kevin Kottek
Ice dancing	Shari Koch / Christian Nüchtern	Ria Schiffner / Julian Salatzki	Kathrin Hauser / Sevan Lerche

== Senior results ==
=== Men's singles ===
Rank	Name	Total points	SP		FS	
1	Peter Liebers	213.12	1	72.77	1	140.35
2	Franz Streubel	186.75	2	65.80	3	120.95
3	Paul Fentz	181.91	4	57.47	2	124.44
4	Martin Rappe	177.09	5	56.56	4	120.53
5	Christopher Berneck	166.98	3	58.47	5	108.51
6	Denis Wieczorek	145.09	6	53.73	6	105.03

=== Women's singles ===
Rank	Name	Total points	SP		FS	
1	Sarah Hecken	152.55	1	53.02	3	99.53
2	Nathalie Weinzierl	150.55	3	49.95	1	100.60
3	Sandy Hoffmann	150.48	2	50.45	2	100.03
4	Jennifer Urban	127.65	4	43.78	4	83.87
5	Katharina Zientek	122.42	7	41.08	5	81.34
6	Isabel Drescher	112.45	5	42.74	8	69.71
7	Jennifer Parker	110.08	10	38.51	7	71.57
8	Nicole Schott	109.29	11	37.51	6	71.78
9	Anneli Kawelke	103.11	9	39.67	11	63.44
10	Angelika Dubinski	102.58	8	40.87	13	61.71
11	Anne Zetzsche	100.44	13	39.35	9	66.44
12	Luisa Weber	95.58	14	32.30	10	66.28
13	Minami Dobashi	93.99	15	30.62	12	63.37
14	Isabelle Glaser	88.90	12	36.01	14	52.89
15	Anna-Katharina Kreisfeld	82.06	16	30.50	15	51.56
16	Alina Mayer	82.06	17	26.20	16	50.25
WD	Minami Hanashiro	WD	6	42.15	Withdrew from competition	

=== Pair skating ===
Rank	Name	Total points	SP		FS	
1	Annabelle Prölß / Ruben Blommaert	147.62	1	50.60	2	97.02
2	Mari Vartmann / Aaron Van Cleave	146.45	2	49.16	1	97.29

=== Ice dancing ===
Rank	Name	Total points	SD		FD	
1	Nelli Zhiganshina / Alexander Gazsi	156.96	1	64.17	1	97.29
2	Tanja Kolbe / Stefano Caruso	145.19	2	58.40	2	86.79
3	Kavita Lorenz / Ievgen Kholoniuk	116.14	4	44.43	3	71.81
4	Katharina Mueller / Justin Gerke	111.83	3	44.69	4	67.14
4	Beatris Katrin Tomchak / Egor Koscheev	70.95	5	28.31	5	42.64

== Junior results ==
The 2012–13 junior competition was held on January 9–13, 2013 at the Eislaufzentrum Oberstdorf in Oberstdorf.

=== Men's singles ===
Rank	Name	Total points	SP		FS	
1	Panagiotis Polizoakis	145.48	2	49.25	2	96.23
2	Alexander Bjelde	145.17	6	47.20	1	97.97
3	Anton Kempf	137.53	3	48.31	3	89.22
4	Genki Suzuki	133.97	5	47.56	4	86.41
5	Manuel Leitner	132.21	1	49.68	5	82.53
6	Christopher Hüttl	129.57	4	47.87	6	81.70
7	Vincent Hey	119.86	7	43.52	7	76.34
8	Jannis Bronisefski	117.97	8	42.64	9	75.33

11 competitors in total and one withdrawal.

=== Women's singles ===
Rank	Name	Total points	SP		FS	
1	Lutricia Bock	123.06	7	39.33	1	83.73
2	Annabelle Prölß	121.69	2	44.29	4	77.40
3	Natalia Fartushina	120.26	6	40.06	2	80.20
4	Maria-Katharina Herceg	119.53	1	48.39	6	71.14
5	Alissa Scheidt	113.06	11	34.48	3	78.58
6	Samira Huskic	110.12	4	40.71	7	69.41
7	Vivienne Schott	109.81	8	37.87	5	71.94
8	Anna Baumgärtel	104.71	5	40.62	8	64.09

32 competitors in total.

=== Pair skating ===
Rank	Name	Total points	SP		FS	
1	Vanessa Bauer / Nolan Seegert	115.90	2	37.46	1	78.44
2	Julia Linckh / Konrad Hocker-Scholler	113.94	1	38.10	2	75.84
3	Christin Schotte / Kevin Kottek	96.20	3	32.87	3	63.33

=== Ice dance ===
Rank	Name	Total points	SD		FD	
1	Shari Koch / Christian Nüchtern	136.70	1	52.36	1	84.34
2	Ria Schiffner / Julian Salatzki	123.61	2	50.81	2	72.80
3	Kathrin Häuser / Sevan Lerche	110.39	3	43.65	3	66.74
4	Loreen Geiler / Sven Miersch	104.32	6	39.36	4	64.96
5	Florence Clarke / Tim Dieck	103.59	4	39.94	5	63.65
6	Polina Gorlov / Eduard Vishnyakov	101.48	5	39.78	6	61.70

9 teams in total and two withdrawals.

== Qualification results ==
After the national championships, the final European Championship qualification standings were published.
