= 2014 European Figure Skating Championships =

Figure skating competition

- Type: ISU Championship
- Date: January 13 – 19
- Season: 2013–14
- Location: Budapest, Hungary
- Host: Hungarian Skating Federation
- Venue: Syma Sport and Events Centre

Champions
- Men's singles: (Spain) Javier Fernández
- Ladies' singles: (Russia) Yulia Lipnitskaya
- Pairs: (Russia) Tatiana Volosozhar / Maxim Trankov
- Ice dance: (Italy) Anna Cappellini / Luca Lanotte
- Previous: 2013 European Championships
- Next: 2015 European Championships

The 2014 European Figure Skating Championships was a senior international figure skating competition in the 2013–14 season. The competition was held in Budapest, Hungary from January 13 to 19th, 2014. Skaters competed in the disciplines of men's singles, ladies' singles, pair skating, and ice dancing.

== Records ==
The following new ISU best scores were set during this competition:

Event	Component	Skaters	Score	Date	Ref
Pairs	Short program	(Russia) Tatiana Volosozhar / Maxim Trankov	83.98	17 January 2014	

== Qualification ==
Skaters were eligible for the event if they were representing a European member nations of the International Skating Union and had reached the age of 15 before July 1, 2013 in their place of birth. The corresponding competition for non-European skaters was the 2014 Four Continents Championships. National associations selected their entries according to their own criteria but the ISU mandated that their selections achieve a minimum technical elements score (TES) at an international event prior to the European Championships.

=== Minimum TES ===
Minimum technical scores (TES)
Discipline	SP / SD	FS / FD
Men	25	45
Ladies	20	36
Pairs	20	36
Ice dance	18	28
Must be achieved at an ISU-recognized international event in the ongoing or preceding season. SP and FS scores may be attained at different events.

=== Number of entries per discipline ===
Based on the results of the 2013 European Championships, the ISU allowed each country one to three entries per discipline.

Spots	Men	Ladies	Pairs	Dance
3	Russia; France	Italy; Russia; Sweden	Germany; Russia; Italy; France	Russia; Italy
2	Czech Republic; Austria; Sweden; Germany; Spain	Spain; Germany; France	(United Kingdom) Great Britain	(United Kingdom) Great Britain; Germany; Azerbaijan; France
If not listed above, one entry was allowed.

== Entries ==
National associations began announcing their selections in mid-December 2013 and the ISU published a complete list on 28 December 2013:

Country	Men	Ladies	Pairs	Ice dancing
Armenia	Sarkis Hayrapetyan			
Austria	Manuel Koll; Viktor Pfeifer	Kerstin Frank	Miriam Ziegler / Severin Kiefer	Barbora Silná / Juri Kurakin
Azerbaijan				Julia Zlobina / Alexei Sitnikov
Belarus	Pavel Ignatenko	Janina Makeenka	Maria Paliakova / Nikita Bochkov	Viktoria Kavaliova / Yurii Bieliaiev
Belgium	Jorik Hendrickx	Kaat Van Daele		
Bulgaria	Manol Atanassov	Anna Afonkina	Elizaveta Makarova / Leri Kenchadze	
Czech Republic	Michal Březina; Tomáš Verner	Eliška Březinová		Lucie Myslivečková / Neil Brown
Denmark	Justus Strid	Anita Madsen		Laurence Fournier Beaudry / Nikolaj Sørensen
Estonia	Viktor Romanenkov	Jelena Glebova	Natalja Zabijako / Alexandr Zaboev	Irina Shtork / Taavi Rand
Finland	Valtter Virtanen	Juulia Turkkila		Henna Lindholm / Ossi Kanervo
France	Florent Amodio; Brian Joubert; Chafik Besseghier	Maé Bérénice Méité; Laurine Lecavelier	Vanessa James / Morgan Ciprès; Daria Popova / Bruno Massot	Pernelle Carron / Lloyd Jones; Gabriella Papadakis / Guillaume Cizeron
Georgia		Elene Gedevanishvili		Angelina Telegina / Otar Japaridze
Germany	Peter Liebers; Franz Streubel	Nathalie Weinzierl; Sarah Hecken	Aliona Savchenko / Robin Szolkowy; Maylin Wende / Daniel Wende; Mari Vartmann / Aaron Van Cleave	Nelli Zhiganshina / Alexander Gazsi; Tanja Kolbe / Stefano Caruso
(United Kingdom) Great Britain	Matthew Parr	Jenna McCorkell	Amani Fancy / Christopher Boyadji; Stacey Kemp / David King	Penny Coomes / Nicholas Buckland; Carter Marie Jones / Richard Sharpe
Hungary	Kristóf Forgó			Dóra Turóczi / Balázs Major
Israel	Alexei Bychenko	Danielle Montalbano	Andrea Davidovich / Evgeni Krasnopolski	Allison Reed / Vasili Rogov
Italy	Paul Bonifacio Parkinson	Carolina Kostner; Valentina Marchei; Roberta Rodeghiero	Stefania Berton / Ondřej Hotárek; Nicole Della Monica / Matteo Guarise; Alessandra Cernuschi / Filippo Ambrosini	Anna Cappellini / Luca Lanotte; Charlène Guignard / Marco Fabbri; Lorenza Alessandrini / Simone Vaturi
Latvia		Ieva Gaile		
Lithuania		Inga Janulevičiūtė		Isabella Tobias / Deividas Stagniūnas
Luxembourg		Fleur Maxwell		
Monaco	Kim Lucine			
Netherlands		Michelle Couwenberg		
Norway	Sondre Oddvoll Boe	Anne Line Gjersem		
Poland	Maciej Cieplucha	Agata Kryger		Justyna Plutowska / Peter Gerber
Romania	Zoltán Kelemen			
Russia	Maxim Kovtun; Sergei Voronov; Konstantin Menshov	Adelina Sotnikova; Yulia Lipnitskaya; Alena Leonova	Tatiana Volosozhar / Maxim Trankov; Ksenia Stolbova / Fedor Klimov; Vera Bazarova / Yuri Larionov	Elena Ilinykh / Nikita Katsalapov; Victoria Sinitsina / Ruslan Zhiganshin; Ekaterina Riazanova / Ilia Tkachenko
Slovakia	Marco Klepoch	Nicole Rajičová		Federica Testa / Lukáš Csölley
Slovenia		Daša Grm		
Spain	Javier Fernández; Javier Raya	Sonia Lafuente; Marta García	Veronica Grigorieva / Aritz Maestu	Sara Hurtado / Adrià Díaz
Sweden	Alexander Majorov; Illya Solomin	Joshi Helgesson; Viktoria Helgesson; Isabelle Olsson		
Switzerland	Stéphane Walker	Tanja Odermatt		Ramona Elsener / Florian Roost
Turkey	Ali Demirboga	Sıla Saygı		Alisa Agafanova / Alper Uçar
Ukraine	Yakov Godorozha	Natalia Popova	Julia Lavrentieva / Yuri Rudyk	Siobhan Heekin-Canedy / Dmitri Dun

Withdrew:

- Magdalena Klatka / Radosław Chruściński
- Nathalie Péchalat / Fabian Bourzat replaced by Gabriella Papadakis / Guillaume Cizeron
- Matthias Versluis replaced by Valtter Virtanen

== Results ==
=== Men ===
Rank	Name	Nation	Total points	SP		FS	
1	Javier Fernández	Spain	267.11	1	91.56	1	175.55
2	Sergei Voronov	Russia	252.55	2	85.51	2	167.04
3	Konstantin Menshov	Russia	237.24	11	72.12	3	165.12
4	Michal Březina	Czech Republic	236.98	5	82.80	4	154.18
5	Maxim Kovtun	Russia	232.37	4	83.15	5	149.22
6	Peter Liebers	Germany	225.76	8	77.42	7	148.34
7	Tomáš Verner	Czech Republic	223.66	3	83.51	8	140.15
8	Brian Joubert	France	221.95	9	73.29	6	148.66
9	Jorik Hendrickx	Belgium	205.92	10	73.21	10	132.71
10	Alexei Bychenko	Israel	203.76	13	68.68	9	135.08
11	Alexander Majorov	Sweden	202.47	6	79.62	13	122.85
12	Chafik Besseghier	France	198.07	12	70.85	12	127.22
13	Florent Amodio	France	190.13	7	78.60	20	111.53
14	Viktor Pfeifer	Austria	189.06	16	60.89	11	128.17
15	Franz Streubel	Germany	182.21	19	59.96	14	122.25
16	Kim Lucine	Monaco	179.89	18	60.00	16	119.89
17	Stéphane Walker	Switzerland	179.52	17	60.54	17	118.98
18	Javier Raya	Spain	179.37	20	57.13	15	122.24
19	Maciej Cieplucha	Poland	179.06	15	65.84	19	113.22
20	Pavel Ignatenko	Belarus	172.08	22	55.99	18	116.09
21	Zoltán Kelemen	Romania	171.26	14	68.32	22	102.94
22	Yakov Godorozha	Ukraine	158.88	21	57.09	23	101.79
23	Paul Bonifacio Parkinson	Italy	157.81	24	52.08	21	105.73
24	Viktor Romanenkov	Estonia	153.66	23	55.43	24	98.23
Did not advance to free skating
25	Sondre Oddvoll Boe	Norway		25	49.84		
26	Marco Klepoch	Slovakia		26	49.48		
27	Matthew Parr	(United Kingdom) Great Britain		27	49.32		
28	Manol Atanassov	Bulgaria		28	49.07		
29	Valtter Virtanen	Finland		29	48.55		
30	Kristóf Forgó	Hungary		30	47.91		
31	Justus Strid	Denmark		31	47.05		
32	Ali Demirboğa	Turkey		32	46.56		
33	Manuel Koll	Austria		33	45.61		
34	Illya Solomin	Sweden		34	44.73		
35	Sarkis Hayrapetyan	Armenia		35	42.90		

=== Ladies ===
Rank	Name	Nation	Total points	SP		FS	
1	Yulia Lipnitskaya	Russia	209.72	2	69.97	1	139.75
2	Adelina Sotnikova	Russia	202.36	1	70.73	2	131.63
3	Carolina Kostner	Italy	191.39	3	68.97	3	122.42
4	Alena Leonova	Russia	178.15	4	64.09	5	114.06
5	Maé Bérénice Méité	France	173.37	5	58.64	4	114.73
6	Valentina Marchei	Italy	165.25	6	57.38	6	107.87
7	Jelena Glebova	Estonia	155.71	8	54.68	7	101.03
8	Nathalie Weinzierl	Germany	151.88	10	53.02	8	98.86
9	Joshi Helgesson	Sweden	146.45	9	54.25	10	92.20
10	Elene Gedevanishvili	Georgia	141.82	7	54.78	13	87.04
11	Roberta Rodeghiero	Italy	141.25	15	48.52	9	92.73
12	Juulia Turkkila	Finland	140.31	12	50.42	12	89.89
13	Laurine Lecavelier	France	139.42	13	49.12	11	90.30
14	Viktoria Helgesson	Sweden	138.73	11	52.55	14	86.18
15	Eliška Březinová	Czech Republic	130.35	16	47.10	16	83.25
16	Isabelle Olsson	Sweden	129.39	22	43.97	15	85.42
17	Nicole Rajičová	Slovakia	128.25	14	49.00	18	79.25
18	Inga Janulevičiūtė	Lithuania	126.20	21	44.24	17	81.96
19	Anne Line Gjersem	Norway	125.58	18	46.63	19	78.95
20	Kaat Van Daele	Belgium	123.05	19	46.18	20	76.87
21	Agata Kryger	Poland	119.52	23	43.59	21	75.93
22	Marta García	Spain	118.11	20	44.61	22	73.50
23	Natalia Popova	Ukraine	112.26	17	47.01	24	65.25
24	Jenna McCorkell	(United Kingdom) Great Britain	110.19	24	39.59	23	70.60
Did not advance to free skating
25	Janina Makeenka	Belarus		25	39.44		
26	Tanja Odermatt	Switzerland		26	39.42		
27	Daša Grm	Slovenia		27	38.52		
28	Sonia Lafuente	Spain		28	38.43		
29	Anita Madsen	Denmark		29	38.42		
30	Ieva Gaile	Latvia		30	37.83		
31	Kerstin Frank	Austria		31	37.44		
32	Michelle Couwenberg	Netherlands		32	36.72		
33	Fleur Maxwell	Luxembourg		33	36.48		
34	Sarah Hecken	Germany		34	35.20		
35	Danielle Montalbano	Israel		35	33.87		
36	Anna Afonkina	Bulgaria		36	31.15		
37	Sıla Saygı	Turkey		37	25.88		

=== Pairs ===
Tatiana Volosozhar and Maxim Trankov set a new world record for the short program (83.98 points).

Rank	Name	Nation	Total points	SP		FS	
1	Tatiana Volosozhar / Maxim Trankov	Russia	220.38	1	83.98	2	136.40
2	Ksenia Stolbova / Fedor Klimov	Russia	207.98	4	70.90	1	137.08
3	Vera Bazarova / Yuri Larionov	Russia	201.61	3	71.70	3	129.91
4	Stefania Berton / Ondřej Hotárek	Italy	195.61	5	69.22	4	126.39
5	Vanessa James / Morgan Ciprès	France	185.48	6	63.23	5	122.25
6	Maylin Wende / Daniel Wende	Germany	168.32	8	55.19	6	113.13
7	Andrea Davidovich / Evgeni Krasnopolski	Israel	163.93	7	55.32	7	108.61
8	Nicole Della Monica / Matteo Guarise	Italy	154.55	9	53.65	8	100.90
9	Mari Vartmann / Aaron Van Cleave	Germany	153.21	10	52.40	9	100.81
10	Natalja Zabijako / Alexandr Zaboev	Estonia	149.82	12	50.12	10	99.70
11	Daria Popova / Bruno Massot	France	149.36	11	52.36	11	97.00
12	Miriam Ziegler / Severin Kiefer	Austria	135.05	15	44.79	12	90.26
13	Stacey Kemp / David King	(United Kingdom) Great Britain	130.98	16	43.98	13	87.00
14	Maria Paliakova / Nikita Bochkov	Belarus	130.46	13	48.18	14	82.28
15	Amani Fancy / Christopher Boyadji	(United Kingdom) Great Britain	127.76	14	47.79	15	79.97
WD	Aliona Savchenko / Robin Szolkowy	Germany		2	76.76		
Did not advance to free skating
17	Alessandra Cernuschi / Filippo Ambrosini	Italy		17	40.29		
18	Elizaveta Makarova / Leri Kenchadze	Bulgaria		18	39.94		
19	Julia Lavrentieva / Yuri Rudyk	Ukraine		19	37.96		
20	Veronica Grigorieva / Aritz Maestu	Spain		20	34.97		

=== Ice dancing ===
Rank	Name	Nation	Total points	SD		FD	
1	Anna Cappellini / Luca Lanotte	Italy	171.61	1	69.58	1	102.03
2	Elena Ilinykh / Nikita Katsalapov	Russia	170.51	2	69.54	2	100.97
3	Penny Coomes / Nicholas Buckland	(United Kingdom) Great Britain	158.69	3	61.76	3	96.93
4	Victoria Sinitsina / Ruslan Zhiganshin	Russia	153.73	4	60.63	4	93.10
5	Ekaterina Riazanova / Ilia Tkachenko	Russia	150.44	5	60.35	5	90.09
6	Julia Zlobina / Alexei Sitnikov	Azerbaijan	147.78	6	59.82	6	87.96
7	Nelli Zhiganshina / Alexander Gazsi	Germany	145.37	7	59.79	8	85.58
8	Charlène Guignard / Marco Fabbri	Italy	144.40	8	58.17	7	86.23
9	Isabella Tobias / Deividas Stagniūnas	Lithuania	142.31	9	56.76	9	85.55
10	Sara Hurtado / Adrià Díaz	Spain	137.58	11	55.21	11	82.37
11	Tanja Kolbe / Stefano Caruso	Germany	137.46	13	53.98	10	83.48
12	Federica Testa / Lukáš Csölley	Slovakia	136.63	12	54.84	12	81.79
13	Pernelle Carron / Lloyd Jones	France	135.29	10	56.35	13	78.94
14	Irina Shtork / Taavi Rand	Estonia	131.66	14	53.88	15	77.78
15	Gabriella Papadakis / Guillaume Cizeron	France	131.57	15	53.33	14	78.24
16	Justyna Plutowska / Peter Gerber	Poland	128.08	17	52.14	16	75.94
17	Alisa Agafonova / Alper Uçar	Turkey	127.96	16	52.90	18	75.06
18	Laurence Fournier Beaudry / Nikolaj Sørensen	Denmark	127.51	18	51.92	17	75.59
19	Lorenza Alessandrini / Simone Vaturi	Italy	121.65	19	50.24	20	71.41
20	Henna Lindholm / Ossi Kanervo	Finland	121.09	20	48.75	19	72.34
Did not advance to free dance
21	Dóra Turóczi / Balázs Major	Hungary		21	46.80		
22	Ramona Elsener / Florian Roost	Switzerland		22	46.36		
23	Siobhan Heekin-Canedy / Dmitri Dun	Ukraine		23	45.84		
24	Allison Reed / Vasili Rogov	Israel		24	44.14		
25	Barbora Silná / Juri Kurakin	Austria		25	43.22		
26	Lucie Myslivečková / Neil Brown	Czech Republic		26	42.95		
27	Angelina Telegina / Otar Japaridze	Georgia		27	42.07		
28	Viktoria Kavaliova / Yurii Bieliaiev	Belarus		28	39.03		
29	Carter Marie Jones / Richard Sharpe	(United Kingdom) Great Britain		29	34.63		

== Medals summary ==
=== Medals by country ===
Table of medals for overall placement:

Rank	Nation	Gold	Silver	Bronze	Total
1	Russia (RUS)	2	4	2	8
2	Italy (ITA)	1	0	1	2
3	Spain (ESP)	1	0	0	1
4	Great Britain (GBR)	0	0	1	1
Totals (4 entries)		4	4	4	12

Table of small medals for placement in the short segment:

Rank	Nation	Gold	Silver	Bronze	Total
1	Russia (RUS)	2	3	1	6
2	Italy (ITA)	1	0	1	2
3	Spain (ESP)	1	0	0	1
4	Germany (GER)	0	1	0	1
5	Czech Republic (CZE)	0	0	1	1
5	Great Britain (GBR)	0	0	1	1
Totals (6 entries)		4	4	4	12

Table of small medals for placement in the free segment:

Rank	Nation	Gold	Silver	Bronze	Total
1	Russia (RUS)	2	4	2	8
2	Italy (ITA)	1	0	1	2
3	Spain (ESP)	1	0	0	1
4	Great Britain (GBR)	0	0	1	1
Totals (4 entries)		4	4	4	12

=== Medalists ===
Medals for overall placement:

Discipline	Gold	Silver	Bronze
Men	Spain Javier Fernández	Russia Sergei Voronov	Russia Konstantin Menshov
Ladies	Russia Yulia Lipnitskaya	Russia Adelina Sotnikova	Italy Carolina Kostner
Pairs	Russia Tatiana Volosozhar / Maxim Trankov	Russia Ksenia Stolbova / Fedor Klimov	Russia Vera Bazarova / Yuri Larionov
Ice dance	Italy Anna Cappellini / Luca Lanotte	Russia Elena Ilinykh / Nikita Katsalapov	(United Kingdom) Great Britain Penny Coomes / Nicholas Buckland

Small medals for placement in the short segment:

Discipline	Gold	Silver	Bronze
Men	Spain Javier Fernández	Russia Sergei Voronov	Czech Republic Tomáš Verner
Ladies	Russia Adelina Sotnikova	Russia Yulia Lipnitskaya	Italy Carolina Kostner
Pairs	Russia Tatiana Volosozhar / Maxim Trankov	Germany Aliona Savchenko / Robin Szolkowy	Russia Vera Bazarova / Yuri Larionov
Ice dance	Italy Anna Cappellini / Luca Lanotte	Russia Elena Ilinykh / Nikita Katsalapov	(United Kingdom) Great Britain Penny Coomes / Nicholas Buckland

Small medals for placement in the free segment:

Discipline	Gold	Silver	Bronze
Men	Spain Javier Fernández	Russia Sergei Voronov	Russia Konstantin Menshov
Ladies	Russia Yulia Lipnitskaya	Russia Adelina Sotnikova	Italy Carolina Kostner
Pairs	Russia Ksenia Stolbova / Fedor Klimov	Russia Tatiana Volosozhar / Maxim Trankov	Russia Vera Bazarova / Yuri Larionov
Ice dance	Italy Anna Cappellini / Luca Lanotte	Russia Elena Ilinykh / Nikita Katsalapov	(United Kingdom) Great Britain Penny Coomes / Nicholas Buckland
