= Lutricia Bock =

German figure skater

Personal information
- Born: 8 May 1999 (age 27) Chemnitz, Germany
- Home town: Chemnitz
- Height: 1.66 m (5 ft 5 in)

Figure skating career
- Country: Germany
- Coach: Ilona Schindler
- Skating club: Chemnitzer FSC
- Began skating: 2005

Lutricia Bock (born 8 May 1999) is a German figure skater. She is the 2014 CS Volvo Open Cup silver medalist and the 2016 German national champion.

== Personal life ==
Lutricia Bock was born in Chemnitz, Germany. Her brother, Wendelin, is an ice dancer.

== Career ==
Bock debuted on the ISU Junior Grand Prix circuit in 2012, placing 15th in Chemnitz, Germany. She then won junior ladies' titles at the Tirnavia Ice Cup and 2013 German Championships.

Bock received two 2013–14 Junior Grand Prix assignments. She finished seventh overall at the event in Riga, Latvia with a technical element score of 49.76 points for her long program. In Kosice, Slovakia, she achieved a technical score of 29.69 for her short program and placed sixth overall. Her technical scores met minimum requirements for all ISU Championships. After successfully defending her junior national title at the 2014 German Nationals, she was assigned to the 2014 World Junior Championships in Sofia, Bulgaria, where she finished 12th.

Competing in the 2014–15 JGP series, Bock placed ninth in Ostrava, Czech Republic and fourth in Dresden, Germany. In November 2014, she made her senior international debut, winning silver at the CS Volvo Open Cup. Her first senior national medal, bronze, came at the 2015 German Championships.

In December 2015, Bock won gold at the German Championships in Essen. Ranked first in the short program and second in the free skate, she finished ahead of silver medalist Nathalie Weinzierl by a margin of 1.83 points. Bock did not reach the final at 2016 European Championships, placing 25th in the short program.

Due to a stumble while on her way to the ice rink on 15 December 2016, Bock tore the inner meniscus of her left knee. She underwent an operation a week later and resumed skating in mid-March 2017.

== Programs ==
Season	Short program	Free skating
2019–2020	Hallelujah by Leonard Cohen performed by Pentatonix	Beauty and the Beast by Alan Menken
2017–2018	Love in Venice by Edvin Marton choreo. by Pasquale Camerlengo	La La Land
2016–2017	Love in Venice by Edvin Marton choreo. by Pasquale Camerlengo	The Artist by Ludovic Bource choreo. by Pasquale Camerlengo
2015–2016	Patch Adams by Marc Shaiman choreo. by Pasquale Camerlengo	The Artist by Ludovic Bource choreo. by Pasquale Camerlengo
2014–2015	Patch Adams by Marc Shaiman choreo. by Pasquale Camerlengo	Crazy For You by George Gershwin choreo. by Pasquale Camerlengo
2012–2014	P.S. I Love You; Swan Lake Remix	Crazy For You by George Gershwin choreo. by Pasquale Camerlengo
2011–2012	P.S. I Love You; Swan Lake Remix	Quidam (from Cirque du Soleil) by Benoît Jutras

== Results ==
CS: Challenger Series; JGP: Junior Grand Prix

International
Event	11–12	12–13	13–14	14–15	15–16	16–17	17–18	18–19	19–20
Europeans					25th				
CS Alpen Trophy								WD	
CS Finlandia					7th			19th	
CS Ice Challenge				5th	8th				
CS Ice Star							9th		19th
CS Lombardia						7th			
CS Nebelhorn						8th			19th
CS Ondrej Nepela								WD	
CS Tallinn Trophy					7th	8th		WD	
CS Volvo Cup				2nd					
Bavarian Open				2nd	2nd			15th	WD
Hellmut Seibt					1st				
Open d'Andorra									6th
International: Junior
Junior Worlds			12th	14th					
JGP Austria					13th				
JGP Czech Rep.				9th		12th			
JGP Germany		15th		4th					
JGP Latvia			7th						
JGP Poland					11th				
JGP Slovakia			6th						
Bavarian Open		5th							
NRW Trophy		10th	6th						
Tirnavia Ice Cup		1st							
Warsaw Cup			4th						
National
German Champ.	14th J	1st J	1st J	3rd	1st				5th
