= Paul Fentz =

German figure skater

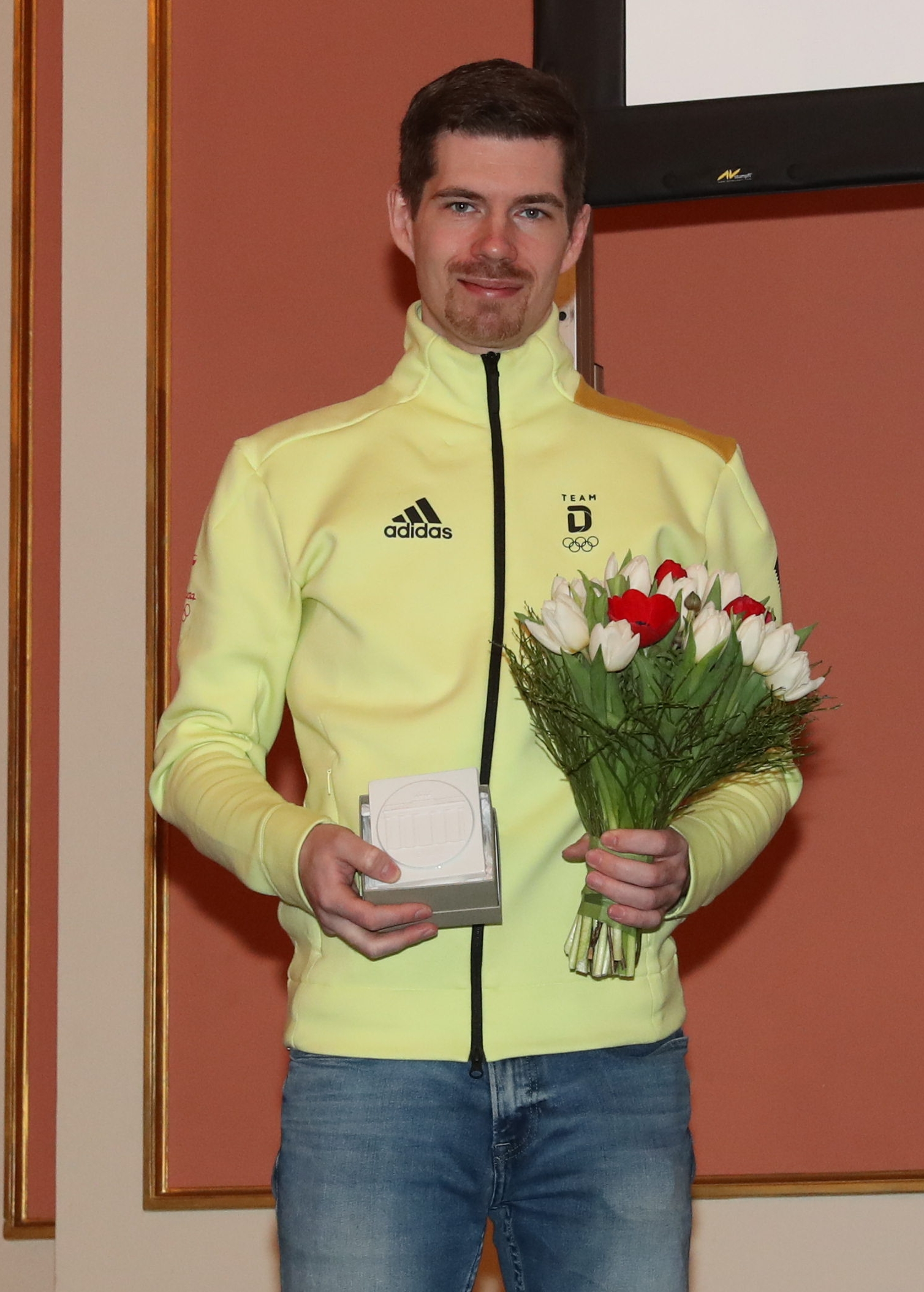
- Fentz in 2022

Personal information
- Born: 8 September 1992 (age 34) Berlin, Germany
- Height: 1.79 m (5 ft 10 in)

Figure skating career
- Country: Germany
- Discipline: Men's singles
- Began skating: 1996
- Retired: January 3, 2023
- Highest WS: 33rd (2016–17)

Medal record
German Championships
Gold medal – first place	2018 Frankfurt	Singles
Gold medal – first place	2019 Stuttgart	Singles
Gold medal – first place	2020 Oberstdorf	Singles
Gold medal – first place	2022 Neuss	Singles
Silver medal – second place	2012 Oberstdorf	Singles
Silver medal – second place	2015 Stuttgart	Singles
Silver medal – second place	2016 Essen	Singles
Silver medal – second place	2017 Berlin	Singles
Bronze medal – third place	2013 Hamburg	Singles
Bronze medal – third place	2014 Berlin	Singles

Paul Fentz (born 8 September 1992) is a retired German figure skater. He has won four senior international medals and is a four-time German national champion (2018–20, 2022). He has competed in the final segment at eight ISU Championships.

== Career ==
Fentz began appearing on the ISU Junior Grand Prix series in the 2008–09 season. His senior international debut came at the 2011 Triglav Trophy.

In the 2011–12 season, he won the silver medal at the 2012 German Championships and was included in Germany's team to the 2012 European Championships in Sheffield, England. After advancing past the preliminary round, he placed 23rd in the short program, 15th in the free skate, and 17th overall.

Fentz won his first senior international medal in February 2013, obtaining bronze at the Bavarian Open and then silver at the Hellmut Seibt Memorial.

Ranked 16th in the short and 17th in the free, Fentz finished 16th at the 2016 European Championships in Bratislava, Slovakia. He placed 12th in the short, 8th in the free, and 10th overall at the 2017 European Championships in Ostrava, Czech Republic. In March, he finished 20th at the 2017 World Championships in Helsinki, Finland. Due to his result, Germany qualified for a spot in the men's event at the 2018 Winter Olympics in Pyeongchang, South Korea.

Fentz was unable to qualify for the men's event at the 2022 Winter Olympics four years later, but he participated as the German entry in the men's short program of the Olympic team event, where he finished ninth of nine skaters.

== Programs ==
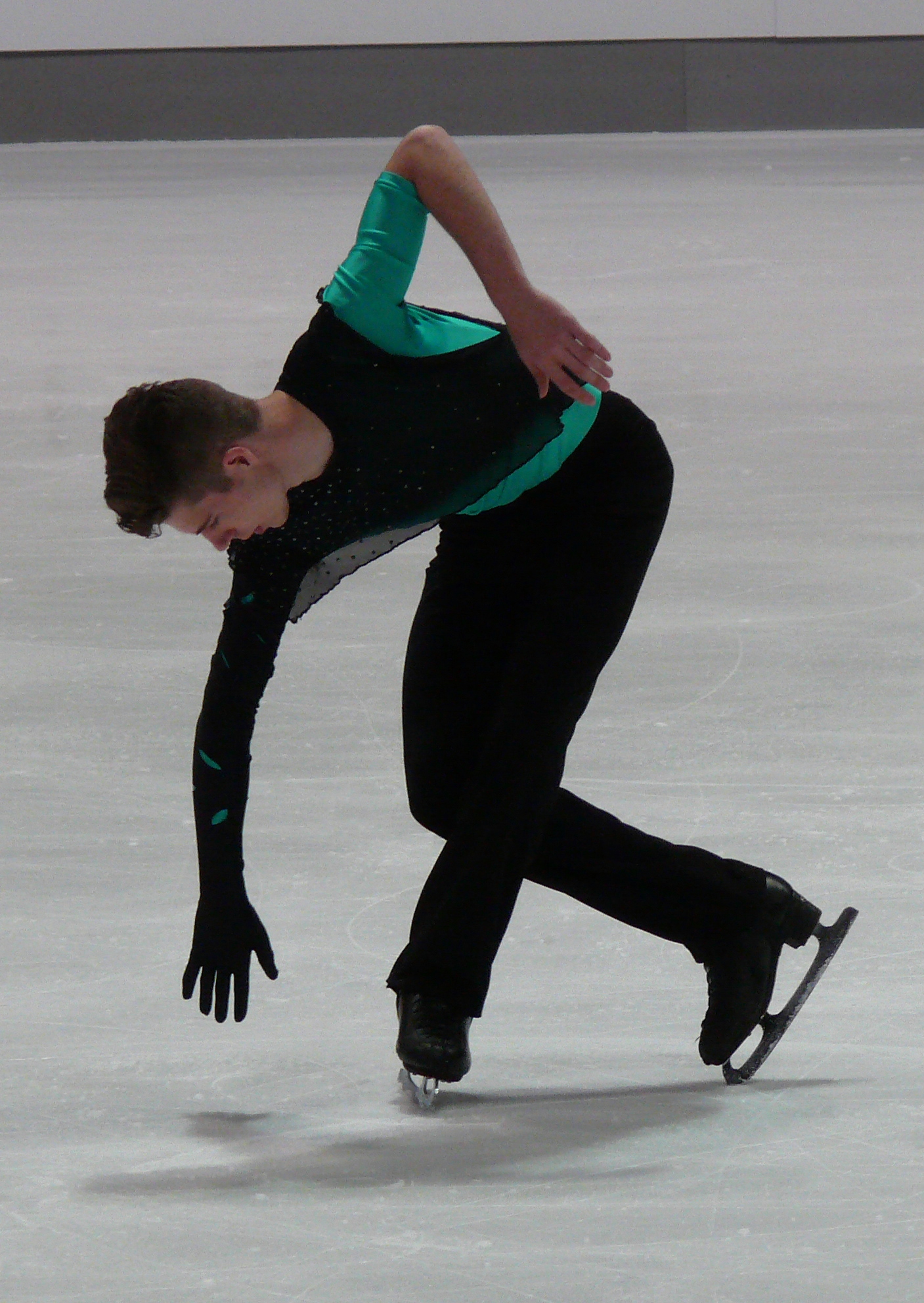
Fentz in 2012

Season	Short program	Free skating
2021–2022	Wire to Wire by Razorlight	Rock You Like a Hurricane by Scorpions
2020–2021	Wire to Wire by Razorlight	I'm Still Standing by Elton John performed by Taron Egerton
2019–2020	Blue Skies by Sam Harris	I'm Still Standing by Elton John performed by Taron Egerton
2018–2019	Blue Skies by Sam Harris	Game of Thrones by Ramin Djawadi
2017–2018	Wonderwall by Paul Anka	Game of Thrones by Ramin Djawadi
2016–2017	Wonderwall by Paul Anka	Hey You; Another Brick in the Wall by Pink Floyd
2015–2016	Barcelona 1999	Hey You; Another Brick in the Wall by Pink Floyd
2014–2015	Barcelona 1999	Nothing Else Matters by Metallica and Apocalyptica
2011–2012	Justice by Genesis	Blood Diamond by James Newton Howard
2010–2011	Music by Ludwig van Beethoven	Once Upon a Time in Mexico performed by Edvin Marton
2009–2010	Love of Japan	Once Upon a Time in Mexico performed by Edvin Marton

== Competitive highlights ==
- GP – Event of the ISU Grand Prix Series
- JGP – Event of the ISU Junior Grand Prix Series
- CS – Event of the ISU Challenger Series
- WD – Withdrew from competition
- C – Event was cancelled

Competition placements at junior level
Season	2009–10	2010–11	2011–12	2012–13	2013–14	2014–15	2015–16	2016–17	2017–18	2018–19	2019–20	2020–21	2021–22
Winter Olympics									22nd				
Winter Olympics (Team event)									7th				9th
World Championships								20th	15th	28th	C	26th	
European Championships			17th				16th	10th	16th	15th	8th		16th
German Championships	8th	5th	2nd	3rd	3rd	2nd	2nd	2nd	1st	1st	1st		1st
GP Italy													WD
GP Rostelecom Cup										6th			
GP Skate Canada									10th		11th		
CS Finlandia Trophy								8th	7th				
CS Golden Spin of Zagreb							9th			8th	14th		
CS Nebelhorn Trophy				16th		12th		8th				6th	13th
CS Tallinn Trophy							10th						
CS Warsaw Cup				4th	4th	4th		7th	7th		12th		12th
Bavarian Open				3rd	4th								
Challenge Cup			9th								8th		
Coupe du Printemps				4th									
Cup of Nice			10th		14th		9th						
Cup of Tyrol								5th					
Golden Bear of Zagreb										2nd			
Hellmut Seibt Memorial				2nd									
Mentor Toruń Cup						4th		3rd					
NRW Trophy			7th	8th	6th	4th		2nd				2nd	
Triglav Trophy		7th											
Volvo Open Cup						WD							

Competition placements at junior level
Season	2007–08	2008–09	2009–10	2010–11	2011–12
German Championships	6th	1st			
JGP Belarus			11th		
JGP Germany				18th	
JGP Great Britain		19th			
JGP Hungary			12th		
JGP Romania					7th
Challenge Cup		6th			
Merano Cup				1st	
NRW Trophy			15th	1st	

== Detailed results ==
ISU personal best scores in the +5/-5 GOE System
Segment	Type	Score	Event
Total	TSS	230.01	2020 European Championships
Short program	TSS	81.86	2020 CS Nebelhorn Trophy
Short program	TES	45.61	2020 CS Nebelhorn Trophy
Short program	PCS	36.80	2020 CS Nebelhorn Trophy
Free skating	TSS	149.60	2020 European Championships
Free skating	TES	71.96	2020 European Championships
Free skating	PCS	77.64	2020 European Championships

ISU personal best scores in the +3/-3 GOE System
Segment	Type	Score	Event
Total	TSS	230.92	2018 World Championships
Short program	TSS	82.49	2018 World Championships
Short program	TES	45.66	2018 World Championships
Short program	PCS	37.02	2018 Winter Olympics
Free skating	TSS	153.17	2017 European Championships
Free skating	TES	82.53	2017 European Championships
Free skating	PCS	75.00	2018 World Championships
