= Atado a Tu Amor =

1998 studio album by Chayanne

Studio album by Chayanne
- Released: September 29, 1998
- Recorded: 1998
- Studio: Altamar Music Studios (San Juan, Puerto Rico); Crescent Moon Studios; Crituera Moon Studios; Midnight Blue Studios; Dream Studios (Miami, FL); South Beach Studios; The Gentleman's Club (Miami Beach, FL)
- Genre: Latin pop; dance-pop; soft rock; latin ballad
- Length: 53:50
- Label: Sony Discos
- Producer: Marcello Azevedo; Estéfano; Donato Póveda; Manny Benito; Steve Roitsein; Keith Thomas; Ronnie Foster

Chayanne chronology
Volver a Nacer (1996)	Atado a Tu Amor (1998)	Simplemente (2000)

Alternative cover

Singles from Atado a Tu Amor
- 1. "Dejaría Todo" Released: August 3, 1998; 2. "Pienso en Tí" Released: November 23, 1998; 3. "Salomé" Released: February 22, 1999; 4. "Atado a Tu Amor" Released: April 19, 1999; 5. "Otra Vez" Released: June 28, 1999; 6. "Sube Al Desván" Released: July 19, 1999; 7. "Enamorado" Released: August 30, 1999; 8. "Refugio de Amor" Released: October 18, 1999; 9. "Soy Como un Niño" Released: November 22, 1999

Atado a Tu Amor (English: Tied to Your Love) is the ninth studio album by recorded Puerto Rican-American recording artist Chayanne. This album was released by Sony Discos on September 29, 1998 (see 1998 in music). It received a nomination for a Grammy Award for Best Latin Pop Album.

The album was certified gold and platinum in several countries and is considered to be one of the best-selling albums in Chile. The album's lead single Dejaría Todo was certified gold in Spain.

== Album history ==
This album was the seventh album by the singer released by Sony Music, and was produced by Estéfano, Donato Poveda and Ronnie Foster. From this album four singles were released, "Dejaría Todo", which peaked at number 1 for two weeks in the Billboard Hot Latin Tracks. "Atado a Tu Amor", "Salomé" and "Pienso en Tí", reaching number 8, 19 and 15 in the same chart respectively.

Also featured in this album is the Spanish version of the song "You Are My Home" featuring Tania Libertad from the soundtrack of the film Dance with Me.

In United States was certified Gold by the RIAA on February 14, 2000, by the RIAA.

In 1999, the album received a Grammy Award nomination for Best Latin Pop Album, losing to Vuelve by Ricky Martin.

== Track listing ==
No.	Title	Writer(s)	Producer (es)	Length
1.	"Dejaría Todo"	Estéfano	Estéfano	4:44
2.	"Soy Como un Niño" (Looking Thought The Eyes Of A Child)	Albert Hammond · Andy Hill · Peter Sinfield; Lyrics: Spanish: Luis Gómez-Escolar	Donato Póveda	4:35
3.	"Enamorado (A Namorada)"	Carlinhos Brown; Lyrics Spanish: Estéfano	Estéfano	3:31
4.	"Atado a Tu Amor"	Estéfano	Estéfano	5:03
5.	"Mira Ven Ven"	J. Belmonte	Ángel "Cucco" Peña	4:14
6.	"Otra Vez"	Donato Póveda · Hal S. Batt	Ronnie Foster	4:00
7.	"Refugio de Amor" (with Vanessa Williams)	Diane Warren; Lyrics: Spanish: Manny Benito	Ángel "Cucco" Peña	3:57
8.	"Salomé"	Estéfano	Estéfano	4:13
9.	"Pienso En Tí"	Estéfano	Estéfano	4:17
10.	"Nadie Como Tú"	Donato Póveda · Hal S. Batt	Donato Póveda	3:40
11.	"Vaya Escandelera"	Rosana Arbelo	Ángel "Cucco" Peña	3:47
12.	"Sube al Desván"	Víctor Manuel San José	Ronnie Foster	3:45
13.	"La Playa"	P. Barough · J. Van Welter · F. Carreras	Ronnie Foster	4:04

© MCMXCVIII. Sony Music Entertainment Inc.

== Music videos ==
1. Dejaría Todo
2. Salomé
3. Atado a Tu Amor
4. Refugio de Amor

== Chart performance ==
=== Singles ===
Year	Chart	Song	Peak position
1998	Billboard Hot Latin Tracks	Dejaría Todo	1
1998	Billboard Hot Latin Tracks	Atado a Tu Amor	8
1999	Billboard Hot Latin Tracks	Salomé	19
1999	Billboard Hot Latin Tracks	Pienso en Tí	15

=== Album ===
==== Weekly charts ====
Chart (1998–1999)	Peak position
European Albums (Music & Media)	52
French Albums Chart	54
Spanish Albums (PROMUSICAE)	2
Switzerland (Swiss Hitparade)	87
US Top Latin Albums (Billboard)	4
US Latin Pop Albums (Billboard)	3
US Heatseekers Albums (Billboard)	22

==== Year-end charts ====
Chart (1999)	Peak position
Chile (IFPI)	4

== Sales and certifications ==
Region	Certification	Certified units/sales
Argentina (CAPIF)	6× Platinum	500,000
Chile (IFPI Chile)	4× Platinum	
Mexico (AMPROFON)	2× Platinum	500,000^{‡}
Spain (Promusicae)	7× Platinum	1,000,000
United States (RIAA)	Gold	500,000^{^}
Uruguay (CUD)	4× Platinum	24,000^{^}
Summaries
Worldwide	—	2,500,000
^{^} Shipments figures based on certification alone.^{‡} Sales+streaming figures based on certification alone.

== See also ==
- List of best-selling Latin albums
