= Shari Koch =

German ice dancer

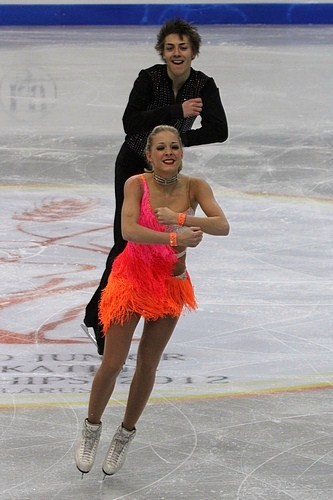
- Koch/Nüchtern in 2012

Personal information
- Born: 23 September 1993 (age 33) Gummersbach, Germany
- Height: 1.69 m (5 ft 6 1/2 in)

Figure skating career
- Country: Germany
- Coach: Barbara Fusar-Poli; Stefano Caruso
- Skating club: DEG Düsseldorf
- Began skating: 1999
- Retired: January 3, 2021
Medal record
Representing Germany
Figure skating: Ice dancing
Winter Universiade
Bronze medal – third place	2017 Almaty	Ice dancing

Shari Koch (born 23 September 1993) is a German former competitive ice dancer. With skating partner Christian Nüchtern, she is the 2014 Bavarian Open silver medalist, 2017 Winter Universiade bronze medalist, and 2019 German national champion.

== Career ==
Koch started learning to skate in 1999. She and Nüchtern made their international debut at the 2008 NRW Trophy. They placed in the top ten at the 2012 and 2013 World Junior Championships and won the German junior national title three times (2011–13).

Koch/Nüchtern won their first senior international medal, silver, at the 2014 Bavarian Open. After missing the entire 2014–15 season, they returned to international competition in February 2016 at the Bavarian Open. In February 2017, they received the bronze medal at the Winter Universiade in Almaty, Kazakhstan.

== Programs ==
(with Nüchtern)

Season	Rhythm dance	Free dance
2019–2020	Blues: Minnie the Moocher; Swing: Everybody Needs Somebody to Love from The Blues Brothers	The Scientist by Coldplay performed by Brooklyn Duo; Viva la Vida by Coldplay
2018−2019	Tango: Poema By Romantica Milonguera; Swing: Hey Signorina By Paolo Belli	Esmeralda tu sais; Belle; Lval d'amour; Danse Mon Esmeralda (From Notre Dame de Paris) By Richard Cocciante
	Short dance	
2017–2018	Samba, Rhumba: Moliendo Café by Paloma Berganza; Samba: Salomé by Chayanne	Io ci saro by Andrea Bocelli
2016–2017	Blues: Beautiful Girl; Swing: Swing My Baby	Romeo and Juliet by Abel Korzeniowski
2013–2014	You Give A Little Love by Paul Williams	Batman Forever by Elliot Goldenthal
2012–2013	Feeling Good by Michael Bublé; Pachuco (from The Mask)	Adagio in G minor by Remo Giazotto, Tomaso Albinoni performed by The Canadian Tenors; Romeo + Juliet
2011–2012	Bla Bla Cha Cha by Petty Booka; Tic, Tic Tac performed by Chilli, feat. Carrapicho	Big Spender (from Sweet Charity) by Cy Coleman; Fever by Peggy Lee; Can't Touch It (from Sex and the City 2) by Ricki-Lee Coulter
	Original dance	
2009–2010	Irish folk: The Blood of Cu Chulainn; Riverdance by Bill Whelan	Samba: Mujer Latina by Thalia; Rhumba: Historia De Un Amor by Perez Prado; Cha Cha: Banca Banca by E-type

== Competitive highlights ==
GP: Grand Prix; CS: Challenger Series; JGP: Junior Grand Prix

With Nüchtern

International
Event	08–09	09–10	10–11	11–12	12–13	13–14	15–16	16–17	17–18	18–19	19–20
Worlds										18th	
Europeans										15th	
GP Finland										9th	
CS Alpen Trophy										6th	
CS Asian Open											5th
CS Golden Spin								8th	13th	4th	8th
CS Ice Star									8th		
CS Nebelhorn										5th	10th
CS Ondrej Nepela								13th	7th		
Universiade								3rd			
Bavarian Open						2nd	9th				
Bosphorus Cup										2nd	
Finlandia Trophy						7th					
Halloween Cup										3rd	2nd
Nebelhorn Trophy						12th					
NRW Trophy						6th				3rd	
Open d'Andorra									3rd		
Toruń Cup								4th			
International: Junior
Junior Worlds				9th	8th						
JGP Austria				4th	4th						
JGP Germany		19th									
JGP Italy				4th							
JGP Turkey					2nd						
Baltic Cup	5th J										
Ice Challenge		7th J									
NRW Trophy	10th J		6th J	2nd J	1st J						
Pavel Roman			7th J	3rd J							
Tirnavia Ice Cup			3rd J								
National
German Champ.	3rd J	3rd J	1st J	1st J	1st J	WD		3rd	3rd	1st	3rd
J = Junior level; WD = Withdrew
