= Nathalie Weinzierl =

German figure skater

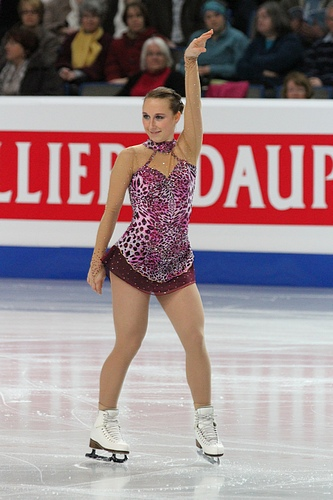
- Weinzierl in 2012

Personal information
- Born: 8 April 1994 (age 32) Saarbrücken, Germany
- Home town: Frankenthal
- Height: 1.59 m (5 ft 3 in)

Figure skating career
- Country: Germany
- Coach: Peter Sczypa
- Skating club: Mannheimer ERC
- Began skating: 2001
- Retired: November 7, 2024

Nathalie Weinzierl (born 8 April 1994) is a former competitive German figure skater. She is a two-time German national champion (2014, 2017) and has won eleven senior international medals, including gold at the Bavarian Open, Dragon Trophy, and Egna Trophy, and Merano Cup. She has placed as high as 7th at the European Championships and competed at the 2014 Winter Olympics in Sochi.

She officially announced her retirement from competitive figure skating in November 2024 due to an injury.

== Personal life ==
Nathalie Weinzierl was born in Saarbrücken, Germany. She trained in alpine racing at SC Frankenthal from 1999 to 2005.

== Skating career ==
=== Early career ===
Weinzierl began training in figure skating in 2001 at Mannheim MERC, coached by Günter Zöller from 2002. She won the German bronze medal on the novice level in 2006, silver on the youth level in 2007, and silver as a junior in 2008. She began competing on the national senior level in the 2008–2009 season, placing 13th in her debut. She changed coaches in August 2009, joining Karin Stephan.

In the 2009–2010 season, Weinzierl debuted on the Junior Grand Prix series, placing 24th and 28th in her two events. Toward the end of the season, she made her first appearance on the international senior level, finishing 5th at the 2010 Triglav Trophy. Peter Sczypa became her coach in August 2011.

=== 2011–2012 season ===
Weinzierl competed with a broken blade in the free skate at the 2012 German Championships. She was assigned to her first ISU Championships, the 2012 European Championships, where she finished 22nd. She then won her first senior international medal, gold, at the 2012 Bavarian Open. She withdrew from the 2012 Coupe du Printemps.

=== 2012–2013 season ===
Weinzierl returned to the JGP series, finishing 9th and 10th in her two events, and then won her first senior national medal, silver, at the 2013 German Championships. After placing 9th in her second Europeans, she competed at the 2013 World Junior Championships, finishing 10th. Weinzierl was also assigned to her first senior World Championships and placed 19th.

=== 2013–2014 season: Sochi Olympics ===
Weinzierl took gold at the Merano Cup and bronze at the Cup of Nice before winning her first senior national title at the 2014 German Championships. She competed at the Europeans, finishing 8th. Weinzierl was selected to represent Germany at the Winter Olympics, held in February 2014 in Sochi, Russia. Ranked 10th in the short program and 21st in the free skate, she finished 18th overall in the ladies' event. In March, she placed 12th at the 2014 World Championships in Saitama, Japan.

=== 2014–2015 season ===
Weinzierl missed the first half of the season due to a back injury. She withdrew from both her Grand Prix assignments. Weinzierl competed at two Challenger events, placing 5th at Lombardia Trophy and 7th at Ondrej Nepela Trophy. She won the silver medal at the German Championships behind Nicole Schott. At the 2015 European Championships in Stockholm, Sweden, she placed 12th.

=== 2015–2016 season ===
Weinzierl started her season with a 9th place at the 2015 Nebelhorn Trophy. She competed at two additional Challenger events, placing 10th at Ice Challenge and 6th at Tallinn Trophy. She won her third silver medal from the German Championships, this time behind Lutricia Bock. At the 2016 European Championships in Bratislava, Slovakia, Weinzierl placed 7th in both segments and overall. She did not qualify to the free skate at the 2016 World Championships in Boston, placing 35th in the short program.

== Programs ==
Season	Short program	Free skating
2021–2022	Until We Go Down (from The Shannara Chronicles) by Ruelle	Losing My Religion by R.E.M. performed by Corinna Jane
2020–2021	Lady Marmalade written Bob Crewe, Kenny Nolan, Kimberly Jones & Melissa Elliott performed by Christina Aguilera, Lil' Kim, Mya & Pink	A Time for Us (from Romeo and Juliet) by Nino Rota performed by George Davidson
2017–2019	Caruso performed by Lara Fabian	The Four Seasons by Antonio Vivaldi
2016–2017	Welcome to Burlesque (from Burlesque) performed by Cher	On My Own (from Les Misérables) performed by Frances Ruffelle
2015–2016	Feeling Good performed by Michael Bublé	Méditation (from Thaïs) by Jules Massenet
2014–2015	Fever performed by Ted Heath and His Music	Chicago by John Kander
2013–2014	Fever performed by Ted Heath and His Music	Rhapsody in Blue by George Gershwin
2012–2013	Exodus performed by Maksim Mrvica	Havana by Dave Grusin
2011–2012	Shall We Dance by Perfidia	Love Story by Henry Mancini
2010–2011	42nd Street by Harry Warren	Love Story by Henry Mancini
2009–2010	42nd Street by Harry Warren	Mac and Mable by Jerry Herman

== Competitive highlights ==
GP: Grand Prix; CS: Challenger Series; JGP: Junior Grand Prix

=== Seasons: 2009–10 to present ===
International
Event	09–10	10–11	11–12	12–13	13–14	14–15	15–16	16–17	17–18	18–19	19–20	20–21	21–22
Olympics					18th								
Worlds				19th	12th		35th						
Europeans			22nd	9th	8th	12th	7th	17th		21st			
GP Rostelecom Cup						WD							
GP Skate Canada						WD							
CS Budapest Trophy												WD	
CS Finlandia Trophy													WD
CS Golden Spin											WD		
CS Ice Challenge							10th						
CS Lombardia Trophy						5th		8th		9th			
CS Nebelhorn Trophy							9th		4th	7th		6th	25th
CS Ondrej Nepela						7th							
CS Tallinn Trophy							6th		WD				
CS Warsaw Cup											WD	C	24th
Bavarian Open			1st	1st				2nd	3rd				
Coupe du Printemps			WD	2nd					8th				
Cup of Nice		18th	20th		3rd		5th		WD				
Dragon Trophy									1st				
Egna Spring Trophy									1st	6th			
Int. Challenge Cup									4th				
Merano Cup			6th	1st									
Nebelhorn Trophy			10th	7th	8th								
NRW Trophy		14th	11th	6th				3rd				4th	
Ondrej Nepela					5th								
Slovenia Open									3rd				
Triglav Trophy	5th	12th											
Universiade						WD							
International: Junior
Junior Worlds				10th									
JGP Austria				9th									
JGP Belarus	24th												
JGP Germany				10th									
JGP Turkey	28th												
Cup of Nice	10th												
Merano Cup		5th											
NRW Trophy	10th												
National
German Champ.	7th	8th	6th	2nd	1st	2nd	2nd	1st	2nd	2nd		2nd	
Team events
Olympics					8th T 9th P								
J = Junior level; TBD = Assigned; WD = Withdrew; T = Team result; P = Personal result

=== Seasons: 2005–2006 to 2008–2009 ===
International
Event	05–06	06–07	07–08	08–09
Cup of Nice			4th J	
NRW Trophy				4th J
National
German Champ.	3rd N	2nd Y	2nd J	13th
Levels: N = Novice; Y = Youth; J = Junior
