= Annabelle Prölß =

German figure skater

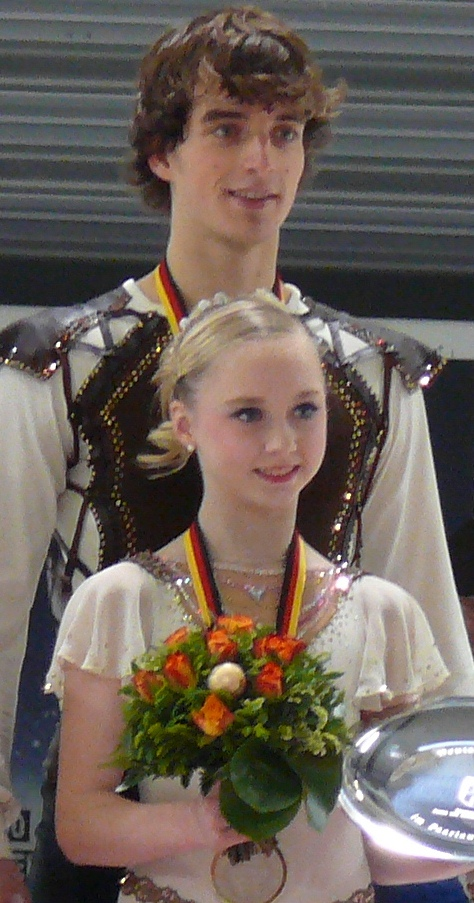
- Annabelle Prölß and Ruben Blommaert at the 2013 German Championships

Personal information
- Born: 30 March 1999 (age 27) Regensburg, Germany
- Home town: Oberstdorf, Germany
- Height: 1.63 m (5 ft 4 in)

Figure skating career
- Country: Germany
- Discipline: Pair skating (2011–15); Women's singles (2011–14)
- Partner: Ruben Blommaert
- Coach: Karel Fajfr
- Skating club: EC Oberstdorf
- Began skating: 2005

Medal record
German Championships
Gold medal – first place	2012 Hamburg	Pairs

Annabelle Prölß (born 30 March 1999) is a German figure skater who is best known for her pairs career. With partner Ruben Blommaert, she is the 2013 Cup of Nice champion and 2013 German national senior champion. She has also competed in singles.

== Personal life ==
Annabelle Prölß was born 30 March 1999 in Regensburg, Germany.

== Career ==
Prölß won the silver medal in single skating at the 2013 German Junior Championships.

=== Pair skating ===
Prölß teamed up with Ruben Blommaert in October 2011. They won the junior pairs title at the 2012 German Junior Championships.

In 2012–13, Prölß/Blommaert made their Junior Grand Prix debut in Lake Placid, finishing 6th, and then placed 4th in Germany. They won gold medals in the junior events at the 2013 Ice Challenge and 2013 Bavarian Open. Prölß/Blommaert won gold in their senior national debut at the 2013 German Championships. They then finished 7th at the 2013 World Junior Championships.

In 2013–14, Prölß/Blommaert debuted on the senior international level. After finishing 4th at their first two events, they took gold at the International Cup of Nice. They received their first senior Grand Prix assignment, the 2013 Trophée Éric Bompard, after France's Daria Popova / Bruno Massot withdrew, finishing seveneth. They then closed their season with a silver medal at the 2014 International Challenge Cup.

In 2014–15, Prölß/Blommaert placed seventh at 2014 Skate America and sixth at the 2014 Rostelecom Cup. The pair soon parted ways after that.

== Programs ==
=== Pair skating with Ruben Blommaert ===
Season	Short program	Free skating	Exhibition
2014–2015	O mio babbino caro (from Gianni Schicchi) by Giacomo Puccini	The Artist by Ludovic Bource choreo. by Lori Nichol	
2013–2014	O mio babbino caro (from Gianni Schicchi) by Giacomo Puccini	Pirates of the Caribbean by Hans Zimmer and Klaus Badelt	Maria (from West Side Story) by Leonard Bernstein, Stephen Sondheim
2012–2013	Italian Fantasia performed by Orchestra Mantovani	Robin Hood by Marc Streitenfeld	Beauty and the Beast by Alan Menken, Howard Ashman performed by Celine Dion and Peabo Bryson

=== Single skating ===
Season	Short program	Free skating
2012–2014	Sirtaki performed by David Garrett	Sleeping Beauty by Pyotr Tchaikovsky

== Competitive highlights ==
=== Pair skating with Ruben Blommaert ===
Competition placements at senior level
Season	2012–13	2013–14	2014–15
German Championships	1st		
GP Rostelecom Cup			6th
GP Skate America			7th
GP Trophée Éric Bompard		7th	
Challenge Cup		2nd	
Cup of Nice		1st	
Lombardia Trophy		4th	
Nebelhorn Trophy		4th	

Competition placements at junior level
Season	2011–12	2012–13
World Junior Championships		7th
German Championships	1st	
JGP Germany		4th
JGP United States		6th
Bavarian Open		1st
Ice Challenge		1st
NRW Trophy		1st
Warsaw Cup		2nd

=== Single career ===
Competition placements at junior level
Season	2011–12	2012–13	2013–14
German Championships	17th	2nd	
Challenge Cup			8th
Cup of Nice			4th
Ice Challenge		4th	
Warsaw Cup		1st	

== Detailed results ==
=== Pair skating with Ruben Blommaert ===
2014–2015 season
Date	Event	Level	SP	FS	Total
November 14–16, 2014	2014 Rostelecom Cup	Senior	6; 48.69	6; 96.47	6; 145.16
October 24–26, 2014	2014 Skate America	Senior	7; 48.87	8; 87.48	7; 136.35
2013–2014 season
Date	Event	Level	SP	FS	Total
March 6–9, 2014	2014 International Challenge Cup	Senior	3; 49.21	2; 90.83	2; 140.04
November 15–17, 2013	2013 Trophée Éric Bompard	Senior	7; 54.18	7; 103.44	7; 157.62
October 23–27, 2013	2013 International Cup of Nice	Senior	2; 57.44	3; 102.81	1; 160.25
September 26–28, 2013	2013 Nebelhorn Trophy	Senior	5; 55.24	4; 103.14	4; 158.38
September 19–22, 2013	2013 Lombardia Trophy	Senior	2; 57.88	4; 98.14	4; 156.02
2012–2013 season
Date	Event	Level	SP	FS	Total
February 27–March 3, 2013	2013 World Junior Championships	Junior	6; 49.95	4; 97.88	7; 147.83
February 6–11, 2013	2013 Bavarian Open	Junior	1; 50.25	1; 99.35	1; 149.60
December 21–22, 2012	2013 German Championships	Senior	1; 50.60	2; 97.02	1; 147.62
December 4–9, 2012	2012 NRW Trophy	Junior	1; 46.36	1; 94.27	1; 140.63
November 15–18, 2012	2013 Warsaw Cup	Junior	2; 48.68	2; 88.17	2; 136.85
November 6–11, 2012	2012 Ice Challenge	Junior	1; 40.83	1; 80.52	1; 121.35
October 10–13, 2012	2012 JGP Germany	Junior	2; 47.84	5; 85.64	4; 133.48
August 30–September 1, 2012	2012 JGP United States	Junior	7; 40.53	6; 81.92	6; 122.45
2011–2012 season
Date	Event	Level	SP	FS	Total
January 6–7, 2012	2012 German Championships	Junior	1 -	1 -	1; 118.01
