= Daniel Wende =

German pair skater (born 1984)

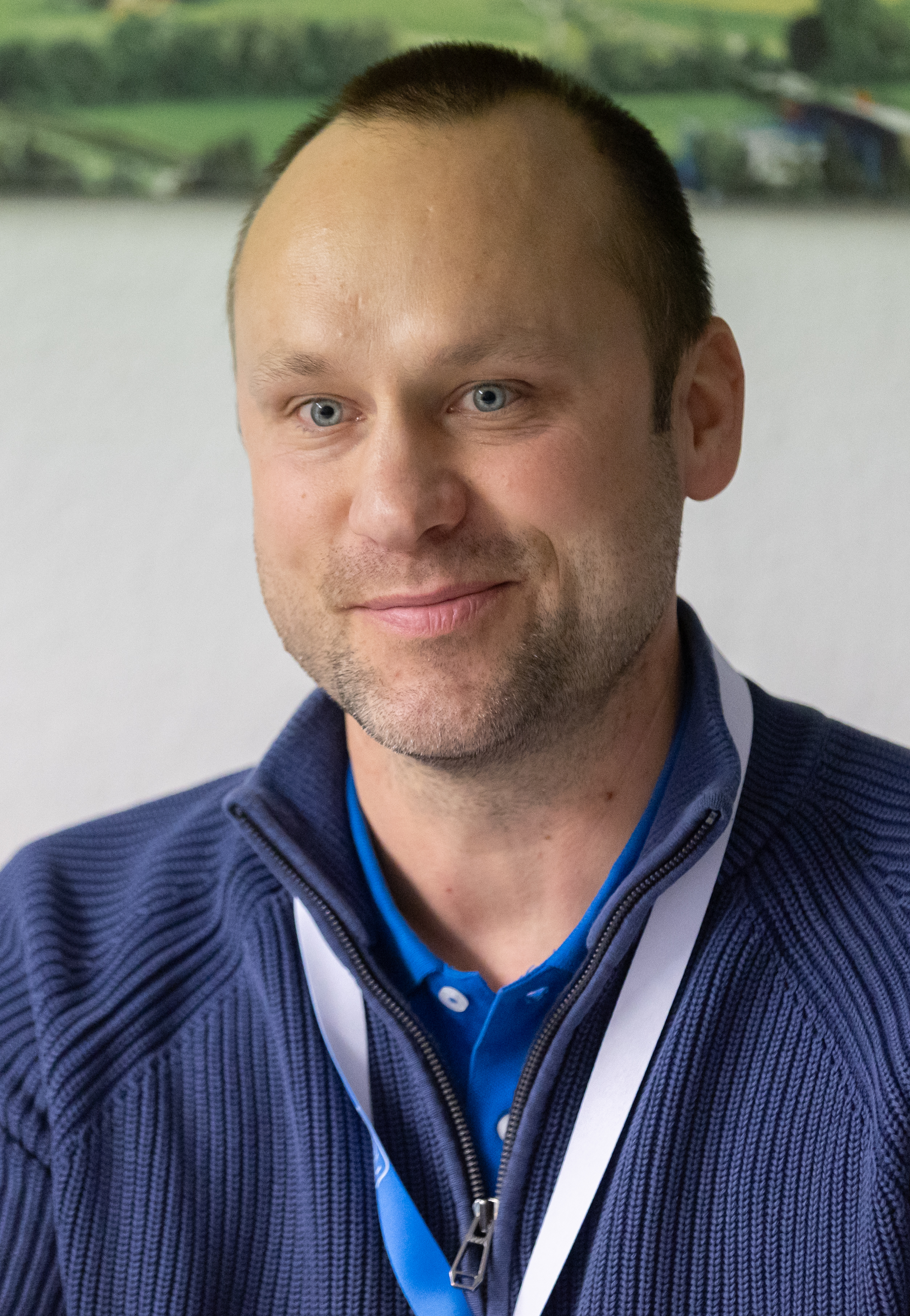
- Daniel Wende in 2025

Personal information
- Born: 24 July 1984 (age 42) Essen, West Germany
- Height: 1.82 m (6 ft 0 in)

Figure skating career
- Country: Germany
- Partner: Maylin Wende (Hausch)
- Skating club: EJE Essen
- Began skating: 1990
- Retired: 2014

Daniel Wende (born 24 July 1984) is a German pair skater. With Maylin Wende, he is the 2010 Trophée Eric Bompard bronze medalist, the 2013 Nebelhorn Trophy silver medalist, and a two-time German national champion. They have competed twice at the Winter Olympics (2010, 2014) and have placed as high as sixth at the European Championships (2011, 2014).

== Career ==
=== Early career ===
After starting out as a singles skater, Wende switched to pair skating at about the age of 16–17. His first partner was Rebecca Handke. The pair twice won the German national junior title and then won the senior silver medal the next two years. They competed at five European Championships and placed as high as sixth (2005). They were also sent to two World Junior Championships, placing eleventh in 2004 and withdrawing in 2005. Their partnership ended in 2007.

Later in 2007, Wende teamed up with Russian skater Ekaterina Vasilieva. They won the bronze medal at the German Championships before deciding to split.

=== Partnership with Maylin Wende (Hausch) ===
Wende teamed up with Maylin Hausch in September 2008, though their training was initially limited due to a ruptured ligament in his right foot. They train in Oberstdorf and are coached by Karel Fajfr.

In the 2010–11 season, Hausch/Wende won a bronze medal at a Grand Prix event, the 2010 Trophée Eric Bompard.

In 2011–12, the pair placed fourth at the 2011 Nebelhorn Trophy. They were eighth at the 2011 Skate America with Hausch suffering from tendinitis in her foot. At the 2012 European Championships, Hausch/Wende finished seventh. On January 26, during the morning practice before the long programs, Wende collided with Mari Vartmann while they were attempting to avoid a French pair.

Hausch/Wende's training for 2012–13 season began late due to death and illness in their families; as a result, they withdrew from the 2012 Cup of Russia. Wende experienced a spinal disc herniation in autumn 2012. The pair withdrew from the 2013 German Championships. They were named in the German team to the 2013 European Championships but withdrew as well due to his back problem. Wende was diagnosed with a second herniated disc in January 2013.

The pair began competing as Maylin Wende / Daniel Wende in the 2013–14 season.

== Personal life ==
Hausch and Wende were married in June 2013.

== Programs ==
=== With Hausch ===
Season	Short program	Free skating
2013–2014	November Rain performed by David Garrett	Your Highness by Steve Jablonsky
2011–2012	Music (is My First Love) by John Miles	Your Highness by Steve Jablonsky
2010–2011	El Tango de Roxanne (from Moulin Rouge!, remixed cover) originally by The Police	Prince of Persia by Harry Gregson-Williams
2009–2010	Black Machine (from Dance with Me); Move to the Big Band by Ben Liebrand	Alexander by Vangelis
2008–2009	Black Machine (from Dance with Me); Move to the Big Band by Ben Liebrand	Alexander by Vangelis

=== With Handke ===
Season	Short program	Free skating
2006–2007	Amélie by Yann Tiersen	Poseidon by Klaus Badelt
2005–2006	Amélie by Yann Tiersen	Shakespeare in Love by Stephen Warbeck
2004–2005	Jalousie performed by André Rieu and Orchestra	Dance of the Vampires by Jim Steinman
2003–2004	Music performed by André Rieu and Orchestra	Le Cid by Jules Massenet
2002–2003	Farewell by F. Duval	Le Bonheur d'Amour performed by Richard Clayderman, James Last; Variations on a Theme of Paganini by Andrew Lloyd Webber

== Competitive highlights ==
=== With Hausch ===
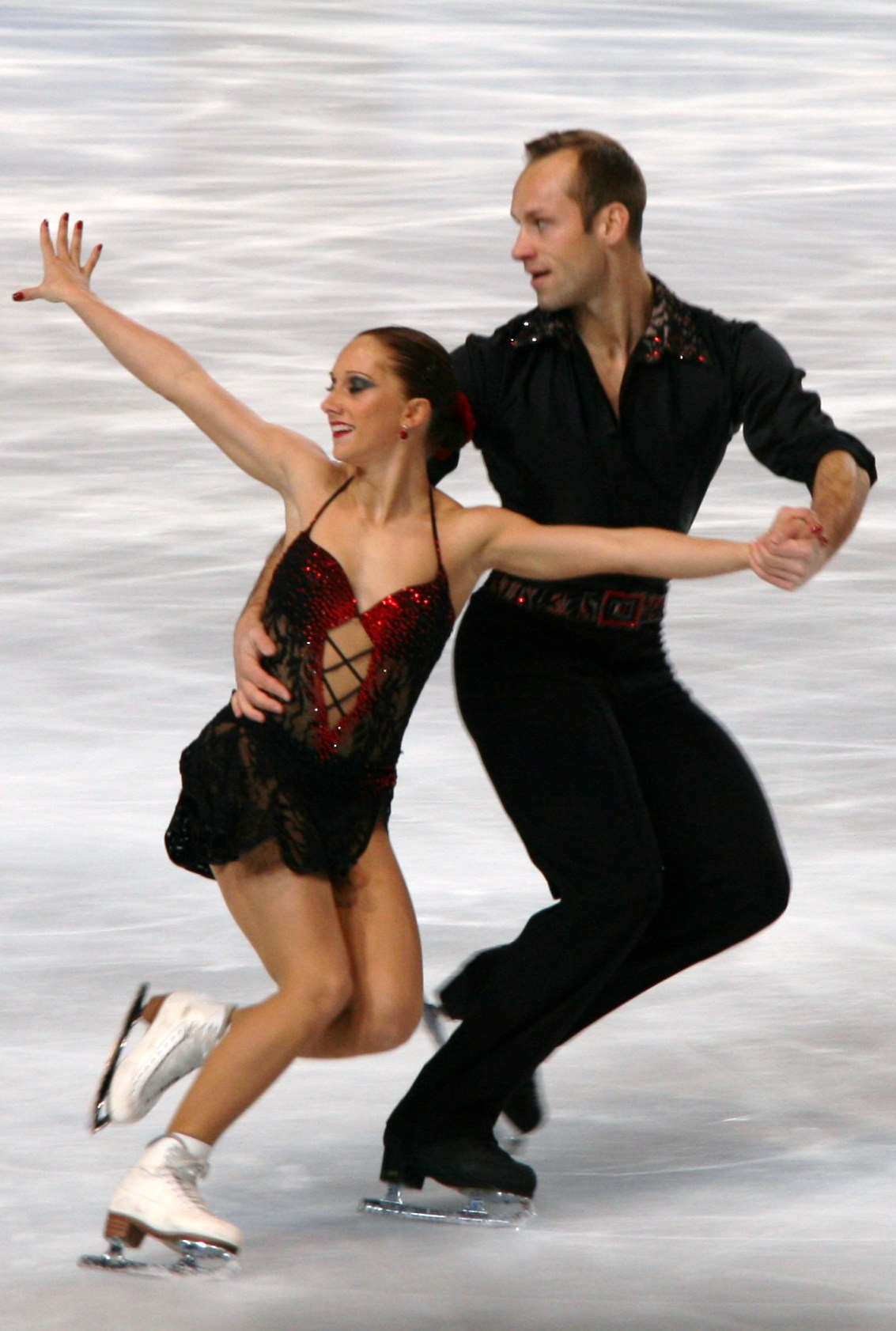
Hausch and Wende perform their short program at the 2010 Trophée Eric Bompard

Results
International
Event	2008–09	2009–10	2010–11	2011–12	2012–13	2013–14
Olympics		17th				13th
Worlds	15th	14th	12th	13th		13th
Europeans	8th	9th	6th	7th	WD	6th
GP Bompard			3rd			
GP Cup of Russia				WD	WD	
GP NHK Trophy			7th			
GP Skate America				8th		
Bavarian Open			1st	1st		
Cup of Nice						3rd
Ice Challenge		4th	1st			2nd
Nebelhorn		7th	5th	4th		2nd
Ondrej Nepela		1st				
National
German Champ.	2nd	1st	WD	1st	WD	2nd
Team events
Olympics						8th T 6th P
GP = Grand Prix; WD = Withdrew

=== With Vasilieva ===
Event	2007–2008
German Championships	3rd

=== With Handke ===
Results
International
Event	2001–02	2002–03	2003–04	2004–05	2005–06	2006–07
Europeans		13th	10th	6th	8th	12th
GP Bompard					8th	
GP Skate America					7th	
Bofrost Cup			4th	3rd		
Nebelhorn					7th	
International: Junior
Junior Worlds			11th	WD		
JGP Croatia			7th			
JGP Germany		8th				
JGP Poland			7th			
JGP Serbia				8th		
EYOF		2nd J.				
Nordics				2nd J.		
National
German Champ.	1st N.	1st J.	1st J.	2nd	2nd	
GP = Grand Prix; JGP = Junior Grand Prix; WD = Withdrew; Levels: N. = Novice; J. = Junior
