= Franz Streubel =

German figure skater

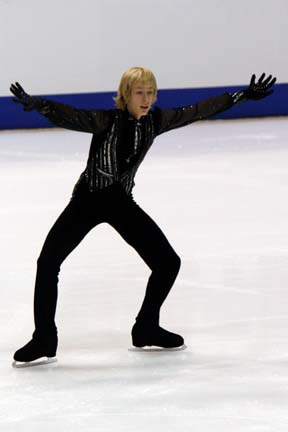

Personal information
- Born: 24 September 1991 (age 35) Berlin
- Home town: Berlin
- Height: 1.85 m (6 ft 1 in)

Figure skating career
- Country: Germany
- Coach: Anett Pötzsch
- Skating club: EC Oberstdorf
- Began skating: 1996
- Retired: November 16, 2017

Franz Streubel (born 24 September 1991) is a German former competitive figure skater. He is a two-time (2015–16) German national champion and has won six senior international medals, including gold at the 2012 Bavarian Open and 2014 NRW Trophy. He has finished in the top 15 at three European Championships.

== Career ==
Streubel debuted on the ISU Junior Grand Prix series in 2007. His first senior international event was the 2007 Finlandia Trophy. He was coached by Karel Fajfr in Oberstdorf during the 2008–09 season. Vlasta Kopřivová and Michael Huth became Streubel's coaches the following season, working with him in Oberstdorf.

Streubel later trained in Berlin, coached by Karin Hendschke-Raddatz in the 2011–12 season and by Heidemarie Walther-Steiner in 2013–14. Streubel made his ISU Championship debut at the 2014 Europeans Championships in Budapest, Hungary. Ranked 19th in the short program, he qualified for the free skate where he placed 14th, rising to 15th overall.

In the 2014–15 season, Streubel trained under Anett Pötzsch in Dresden. He became the German national champion in December 2014. At the 2015 European Championships in Stockholm, Sweden, he placed 13th in both segments and overall.

== Programs ==
| Season | Short program | Free skating |
|---|---|---|
| 2016–2017 | Samba Pa Ti; Oye Cómo Va; Soul Sacrifice by Santana | Queen; The Show Must Go On; We Will Rock You; Bohemian Rhapsody; Another One Bites the Dust |
| 2015–2016 | Samba Pa Ti; Oye Cómo Va; Soul Sacrifice by Santana | Django Unchained; Day of Anger by Riz Ortolani; Django by Luis Bacalov; Nicaragua by Jerry Goldsmith; Who Did That To You by John Legend |
| 2014–2015 | Piano Concerto No. 18 op. 23 I. Allegro Con Spirito by Pyotr I. Tchaikovsky by the Tbilisi Symphony Orchestra | I Giorni Dell'ira (#3) by Riz Ortolani |
| 2013–2014 | Piano Concerto No. 18 op. 23 I. Allegro Con Spirito by Pyotr I. Tchaikovsky by the Tbilisi Symphony Orchestra | Man with a Harmonica (from Once Upon a Time in the West) by Ennio Morricone; The Good, the Bad and the Ugly by Geoff Love; As a Judgement (from Once Upon a Time in the West) by Ennio Morricone; Rawhide by Geoff Love |
| 2011–2012 | La Fiesta Mondiale by TGV Musique; Lai Lai Lai | Transformers by Steve Jablonsky; Arrival to Earth; Sector 7; Matrix of Leadership; Aoccent Attack |
| 2009–2010 | Tangology by Gigi D'Agostino | Once Upon a Time in the West by Ennio Morricone |
| 2008–2009 | | Cirque du Soleil |

== Competitive highlights ==
International
| Event | 07–08 | 08–09 | 09–10 | 10–11 | 11–12 | 12–13 | 13–14 | 14–15 | 15–16 | 16–17 |
|---|---|---|---|---|---|---|---|---|---|---|
| Worlds | | | | | | | | | 28th | |
| Europeans | | | | | | | 15th | 13th | 14th | |
| CS DS Cup | | | | | | | | | 4th | |
| CS Nebelhorn | | | | | | | | | 11th | 10th |
| CS Volvo Cup | | | | | | | | 9th | | |
| CS Warsaw Cup | | | | | | | | | 7th | |
| Bavarian Open | | | | | 1st | 6th | 2nd | 2nd | 2nd | |
| Cup of Nice | | | | | 15th | | | | | |
| Finlandia Trophy | 11th | | | | | | | | | |
| Golden Spin | | | 9th | | | | | | | |
| Ice Challenge | | | | | | 12th | | | | |
| Merano Cup | | | | | | | 6th | | | |
| Nebelhorn Trophy | | | | 14th | 12th | | | | | |
| New Year's Cup | | | | | | 4th | | | | |
| NRW Trophy | | | | | 10th | 10th | 5th | 1st | | |
| Printemps | | | | | 3rd | | | | | |
| Toruń Cup | | | | | | | | | | 6th |
| Warsaw Cup | | | | | | 6th | | | | |
International: Junior
| JGP France | | 11th | | 8th | | | | | | |
| JGP Germany | | | 8th | | | | | | | |
| JGP Italy | | 15th | | | | | | | | |
| JGP Poland | | | 10th | | | | | | | |
| JGP USA | 10th | | | | | | | | | |
| Ice Challenge | | | 1st J | | | | | | | |
| Merano Cup | | | 2nd J | | | | | | | |
National
| German Champ. | | 9th | 9th | 7th | 5th | 2nd | 2nd | 1st | 1st | 3rd |
