= Julian Salatzki =

German ice dancer

Personal information
- Born: 13 December 1993 (age 32) Berlin, Germany
- Home town: Berlin, Germany
- Height: 1.86 m (6 ft 1 in)

Figure skating career
- Country: Germany
- Partner: Ria Schiffner
- Coach: Oleg Ryzhkin
- Skating club: SC Berlin
- Began skating: 1998

Julian Salatzki (born 13 December 1993) is a German ice dancer. With partner Ria Schiffner, he was the 2013 German national junior silver medalist and finished 16th at the 2014 World Junior Championships.

== Programs ==
(with Schiffner)

Season	Short dance	Free dance
2013–14	It's De-Lovely by Robbie Williams	Anna Karenina by Dario Marianelli
2012–13	Stop and Stare by The Baseballs; Big and Bad by Big Bad Voodoo Daddy	Prayer in the Night by Amici Forever
2011–12	Corazón Espinado by Carlos Santana; Demasiado Corazon by Willy DeVille	We Will Rock You; Bohemian Rhapsody by Queen

== Competitive highlights ==
(with Schiffner)

International
Event	08–09	10–11	11–12	12–13	13–14
World Junior Champ.				19th	16th
JGP Estonia			14th		
JGP Germany				10th	
JGP Slovakia					8th
JGP Slovenia				13th	
Bavarian Open				7th J	
Ice Challenge		4th J	3rd J		
Mont Blanc Trophy		7th J			
Pavel Roman Memorial	5th N	12th J	6th J		
Santa Claus Cup			12th J	5th J	
National
German Champ.	5th N	7th J	4th J	2nd J	
JGP = Junior Grand Prix; Levels: N = Novice; J = Junior
