= Tanja Kolbe =

German ice dancer

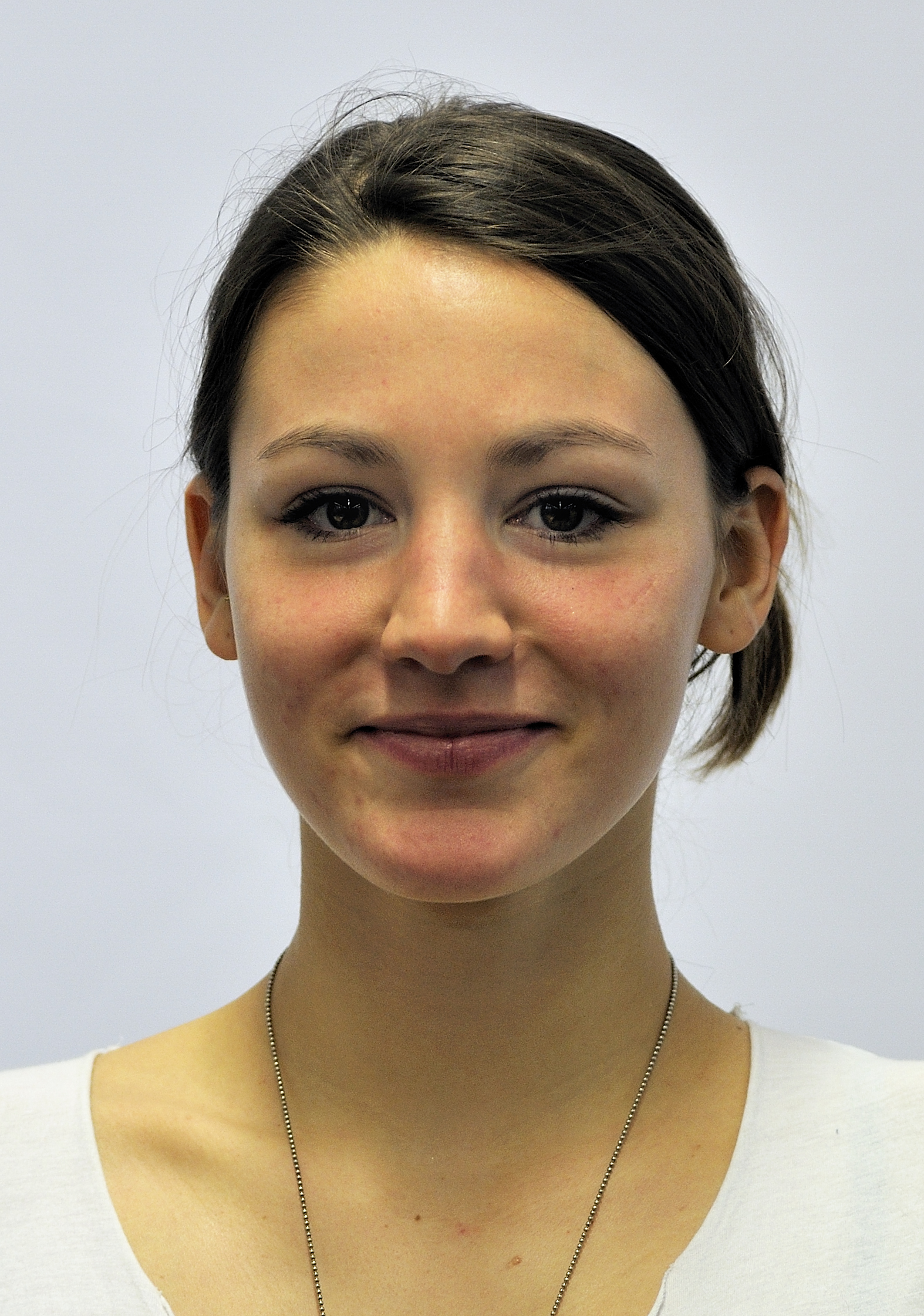
- Kolbe in 2014

Personal information
- Born: 7 September 1990 (age 36) Berlin
- Height: 1.69 m (5 ft 7 in)

Figure skating career
- Country: Germany
- Skating club: TSC Berlin
- Began skating: 1994
- Retired: 2014

Tanja Kolbe (born 7 September 1990) is a German former competitive ice dancer. With Stefano Caruso, she won seven international medals and two German national silver medals. They placed eighth at the 2013 European Championships and competed at the 2014 Winter Olympics, finishing 19th.

== Personal life ==
Tanja Kolbe was born 7 September 1990 in Berlin, Germany. She studied business communication in Berlin and has worked for the Bundeswehr's sports group. She and her partner, Alexander Nissen, have a son named Moritz, born on 11 October 2015.

== Career ==
=== Early career ===
From 2003 to 2006, Kolbe competed with Paul Boll. They won the 2006 German national junior title and were sent to the 2006 World Junior Championships where they placed 16th.

In 2006, Kolbe teamed up with Sascha Rabe. In their first season together, they competed on the junior level. They appeared at two ISU Junior Grand Prix events and took the silver medal at the German Junior Championships. The next three season, Kolbe/Rabe competed on the senior level. They took bronze at the 2009 German Championships. After Rabe decided to retire in 2010, she had a tryout with Deividas Stagniūnas of Lithuania.

=== Partnership with Caruso ===
Kolbe teamed up with Italian ice dancer Stefano Caruso in 2010. In their first season together, they took bronze at the 2010 Ice Challenge and at the 2011 German Championships.

In their second season together, Kolbe/Caruso won two international medals, gold at the 2011 NRW Trophy and bronze at the Istanbul Cup. They took the silver medal at the German Championships and were assigned to the 2012 European Championships where they finished 12th. The duo split up after the event but teamed up again in July 2012.

In the 2012–13 season, Kolbe/Caruso took silver again at the German Championships and earned another trip to the European Championships where they finished 8th. They won two international medals – bronze at both the New Year's Cup and Volvo Open Cup.

In the 2013–14 season, Kolbe/Caruso were invited to their first Grand Prix event, the 2013 Trophee Eric Bompard where they placed 7th. They added two more international medals to their collection – bronze at the 2013 Ondrej Nepela Trophy and Ice Challenge. In February 2014, Kolbe/Caruso competed at the Winter Olympics in Sochi and finished 19th. They announced the end of their partnership in June 2014.

== Programs ==
=== With Caruso ===
Season	Short dance	Free dance
2013–2014	New York, New York performed by Liza Minnelli, Luciano Pavarotti; Borsalino performed by Tokyo Hosei Orchestra; New York, New York performed by Liza Minnelli, Luciano Pavarotti	Enchanted by Alan Menken: Narissa Arrives; Storybook Ending; Andalasia
2012–2013	La Foule by Édith Piaf; French Can Can (from Gaite Parisienne) by Jacques Offenbach	Beethoven's Last Night by Trans-Siberian Orchestra: Overture – Moonlight Sonata; Dream of Candlelight; Moonlight Sonata
2011–2012	Bla Bla Cha Cha by Petty Booka; Besame Mucho; Give It Up by The Goodman	Love Story by Francis Lai; Summer of '42 by Michel Legrand
2010–2011	Que Sera, Sera by Doris Day; Sugar by Alma Cogan	Tore My Heart by Oona; Man's World by Natacha Atlas

=== With Rabe ===
Season	Original dance	Free dance
2009–2010	German folk: Wir tanzen wieder Polka; Amboß Polka; O wie bist du schön	Come On In My House by Bella Reese; Ain't No Sunshine by Bill Withers; Hip Hip Chin Chin by Club des Belugas

=== With Boll ===
Season	Original dance	Free dance
2005–2006	Sway; Bella Maria by Michael Buble; Happy Brazil by James Last	The Mask of Zorro by James Horner
2004–2005	Slow Foxtrot; Quickstep	Black Machine

== Competitive highlights ==
GP = Grand Prix; JGP = Junior Grand Prix

=== With Caruso ===
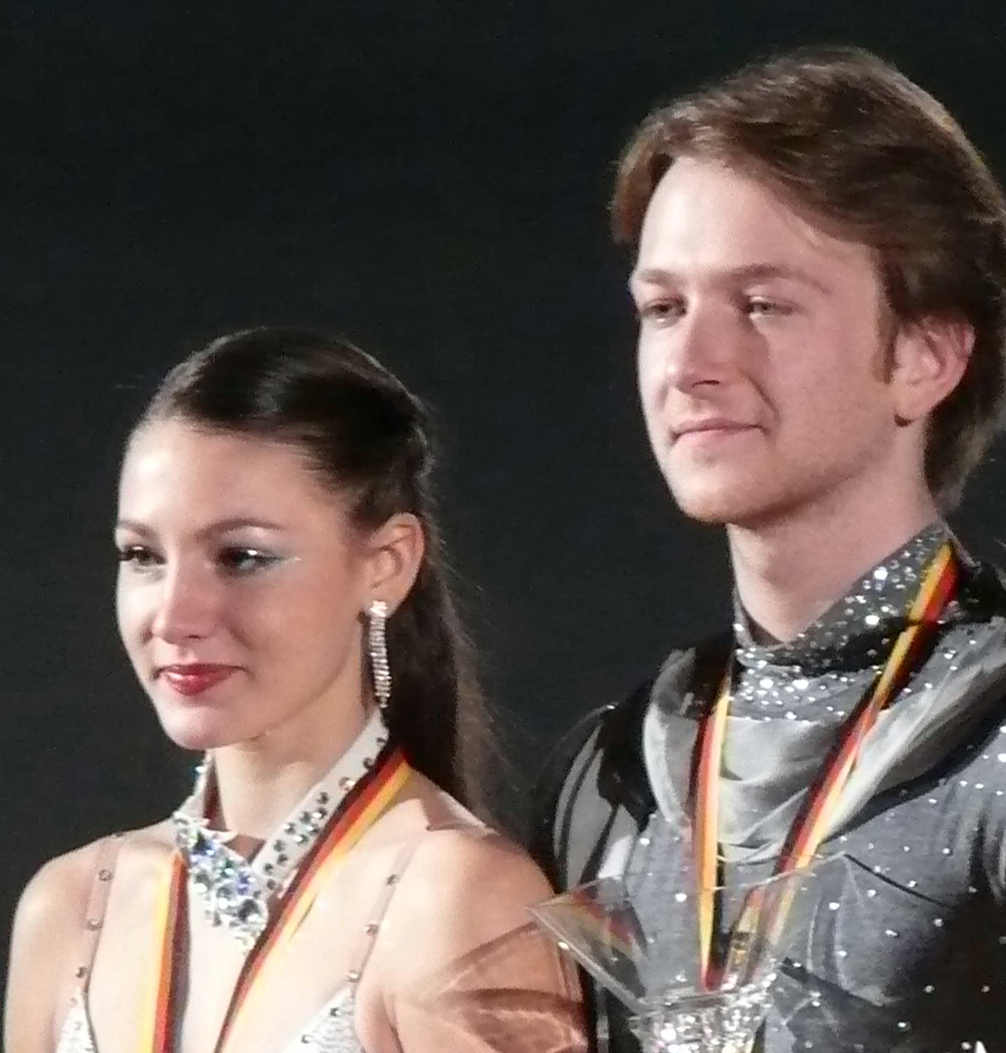
Kolbe/Caruso at the 2012 German Championships

International
Event	2010–11	2011–12	2012–13	2013–14
Winter Olympics				19th
World Champ.				21st
European Champ.		12th	8th	11th
GP Trophee Bompard				7th
Bavarian Open			4th	
Cup of Nice		4th		
Finlandia Trophy		6th		
Golden Spin	7th	6th	5th	
Ice Challenge	3rd			3rd
Istanbul Cup		3rd		
New Year's Cup			3rd	
NRW Trophy	8th	1st		
Ondrej Nepela				3rd
Pavel Roman	4th			
Volvo Open Cup			3rd	
National
German Champ.	3rd	2nd	2nd	2nd

=== With Rabe ===
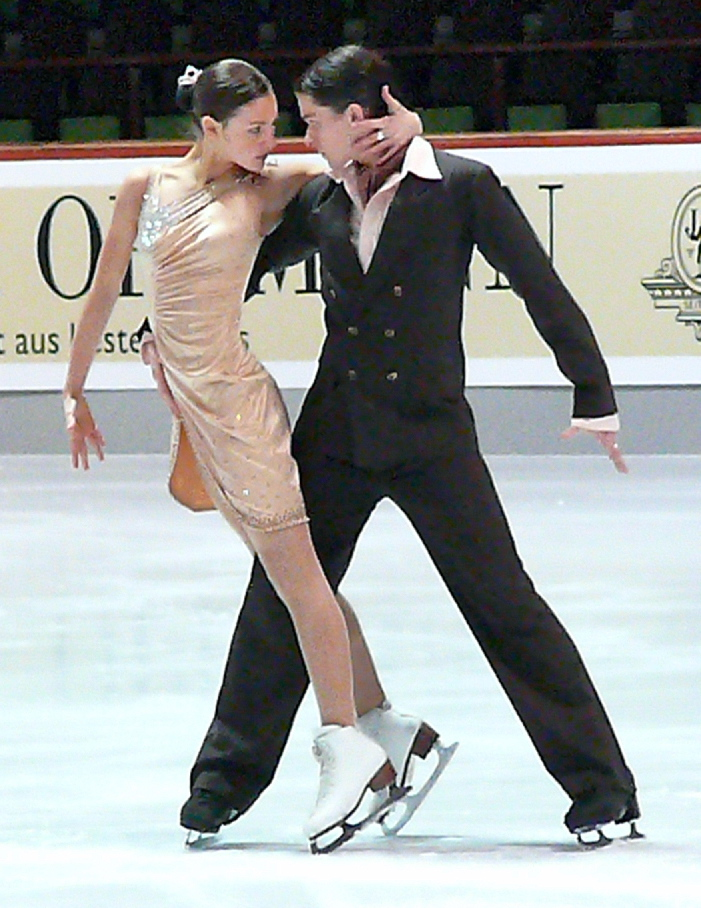
Tanja Kolbe and Sascha Rabe at the 2007 German Junior Championships

International
Event	2006–07	2007–08	2008–09	2009–10
Golden Spin				7th
Ice Challenge				8th
Nebelhorn Trophy		13th		14th
Ondrej Nepela			5th	
Pavel Roman		4th		
International: Junior
JGP Czech Republic	5th			
JGP Netherlands	6th			
Pavel Roman	1st			
National
German Champ.	2nd J		3rd	WD
J = Junior level; WD = Withdrew

=== With Boll ===
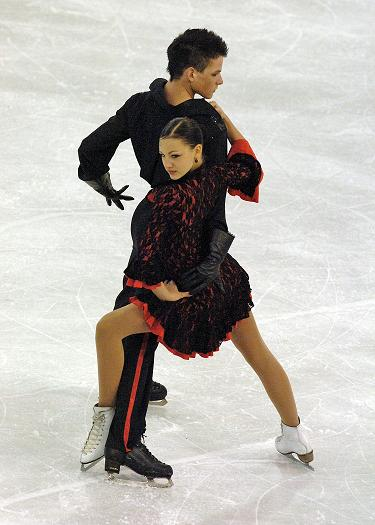
Tanja Kolbe and Paul Boll at the 2006 World Junior Championships

International: Junior
Event	2004–05	2005–06
World Junior Champ.		16th
JGP Canada		6th
JGP Estonia		8th
JGP Germany	WD	
JGP USA	8th	
Nordics	2nd	
National
German Champ.	3rd J	1st J
J = Junior level; WD = Withdrew
