= Maylin Wende =

German pair skater (born 1988)

Maylin Wende (Hausch)
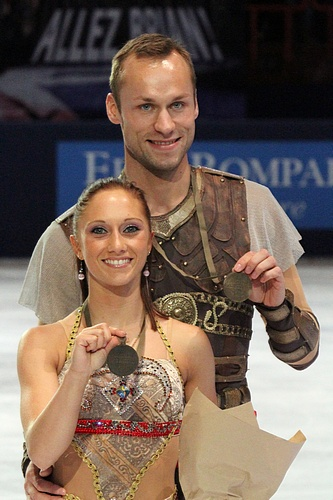
- Maylin and Daniel Wende at the 2010 Trophée Eric Bompard

Personal information
- Other names: Maylin Hausch (until mid-2013)
- Born: 22 September 1988 (age 38) Stuttgart, West Germany
- Height: 1.54 m (5 ft 1 in)

Figure skating career
- Country: Germany
- Partner: Daniel Wende
- Skating club: EC Oberstdorf
- Began skating: 1992
- Retired: 2014

Maylin Wende (née Hausch; born 22 September 1988) is a German pair skater. With husband and partner Daniel Wende, she is the 2010 Trophée Eric Bompard bronze medalist, the 2013 Nebelhorn Trophy silver medalist, and a two-time German national champion. They have competed twice at the Winter Olympics (2010, 2014) and have placed as high as sixth at the European Championships (2011, 2014).

== Career ==
=== Early career ===
Maylin Hausch began skating in 1992. She skated in singles until 2006, finishing as high as fourth in Junior Ladies at the 2004 German Junior and Novice National Championships.

Hausch took up pair skating at age 17. Her first skating partner was Steffen Hörmann, with whom she was the 2006 German junior national champion. He decided to quit after that competition. Hausch was unable to find a partner afterward and so competed as a single skater.

=== Partnership with Daniel Wende ===
Hausch teamed up with Daniel Wende in September 2008. They train in Oberstdorf and are coached by Karel Fajfr.

In the 2010–11 season, Hausch/Wende won a bronze medal at a Grand Prix event, the 2010 Trophée Eric Bompard.

In 2011–12, the pair placed fourth at the 2011 Nebelhorn Trophy. They were eighth at the 2011 Skate America with Hausch suffering from tendinitis in her foot. At the 2012 European Championships, Hausch/Wende finished seventh. On January 26, during the morning practice before the long programs, Wende collided with Mari Vartmann while they were attempting to avoid a French pair.

Hausch/Wende's training for the 2012–13 season began late due to death and illness in their families; as a result, they withdrew from the 2012 Cup of Russia. Wende experienced a spinal disc herniation in autumn 2012. The pair withdrew from the 2013 German Championships. They were named in the German team to the 2013 European Championships but withdrew as well due to his back problem. Wende was diagnosed with a second herniated disc in January 2013.

She began competing as Maylin Wende in the 2013–14 season.

== Personal life ==
Hausch and Wende were married in June 2013.

== Programs ==
With Wende

Season	Short program	Free skating
2013–2014	November Rain performed by David Garrett	Your Highness by Steve Jablonsky
2011–2012	Music (is My First Love) by John Miles	Your Highness by Steve Jablonsky
2010–2011	El Tango de Roxanne (from Moulin Rouge!, remixed cover) originally by The Police	Prince of Persia by Harry Gregson-Williams
2009–2010	Black Machine (from Dance with Me); Move to the Big Band by Ben Liebrand	Alexander by Vangelis
2008–2009	Black Machine (from Dance with Me); Move to the Big Band by Ben Liebrand	Alexander by Vangelis

== Competitive highlights ==
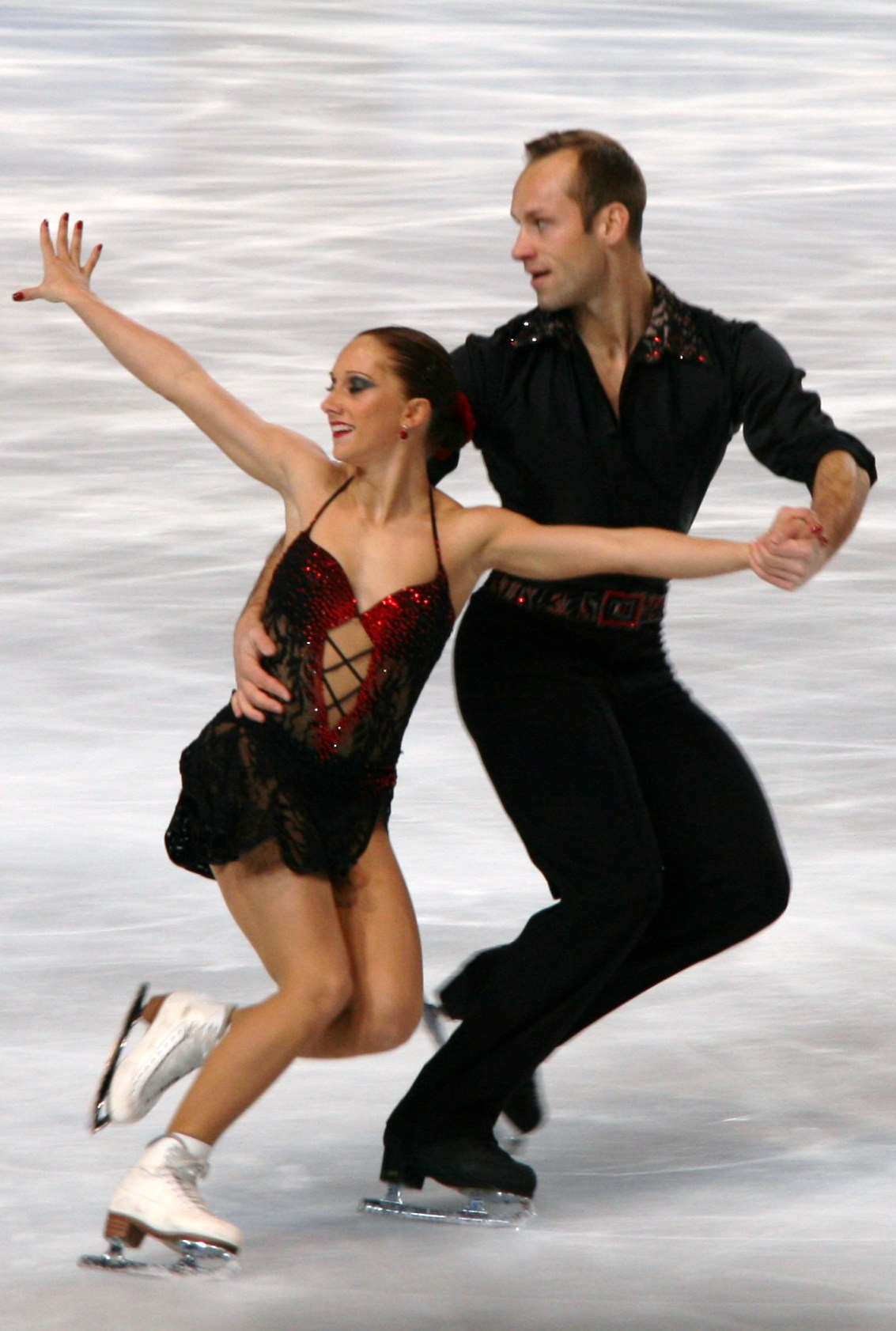
Hausch and Wende perform their short program at 2010 Trophée Eric Bompard

(with Wende)

Results
International
Event	2008–09	2009–10	2010–11	2011–12	2012–13	2013–14	2014–15
Olympics		17th				13th	
Worlds	15th	14th	12th	13th		13th	
Europeans	8th	9th	6th	7th	WD	6th	
GP Bompard			3rd				
GP Cup of Russia				WD	WD		
GP NHK Trophy			7th				
GP Skate America				8th			
Bavarian Open			1st	1st			
Cup of Nice						3rd	
Ice Challenge		4th	1st			2nd	
Nebelhorn		7th	5th	4th		2nd	
Ondrej Nepela		1st					
National
German Champ.	2nd	1st	WD	1st	WD	2nd	
Team events
Olympics						8th T 6th P	
GP = Grand Prix; WD = Withdrew
