= Salomé (song) =

Single by Chayanne

from the album Atado a Tu Amor
- Released: 1999
- Recorded: 1998
- Genre: Latin pop
- Length: 4:13
- Label: Sony Discos
- Songwriter: Estéfano
- Producer: Ronnie Foster

Chayanne singles chronology
"Pienso en ti" (1999)	"Salomé" (1999)	"Atado a tu amor" (1999)

Music video
- "Salome" on YouTube

"Salomé" is a Latin pop/dance song written by Estéfano, produced by Ronnie Foster and performed by the Puerto Rican singer Chayanne. It was the third single released from the studio album Atado a Tu Amor (1998), nominated to the Grammy Award for Best Latin Pop Album. The song was a success in Spain where it peaked at number one. It was certified gold in France and reached 12th position in the French charts.

== Chart performance ==
Chart (1999)	Peak position
France (SNEP)	12
Italy (Musica e dischi)	28
Netherlands (Single Top 100)	82
Netherlands (Dutch Top 40 Tipparade)	17
Spain (PROMUSICAE)	1
Switzerland (Schweizer Hitparade)	62
US Hot Latin Songs (Billboard)	19

=== Year-end charts ===
Chart (1999)	Rank
France (SNEP)	96

== Certifications and sales ==
Region	Certification	Certified units/sales
France (SNEP)	Gold	250,000^{*}
Mexico (AMPROFON)	Platinum+Gold	90,000^{‡}
^{*} Sales figures based on certification alone.^{‡} Sales+streaming figures based on certification alone.
