= Stefano Caruso =

Ice dancer (born 1987)

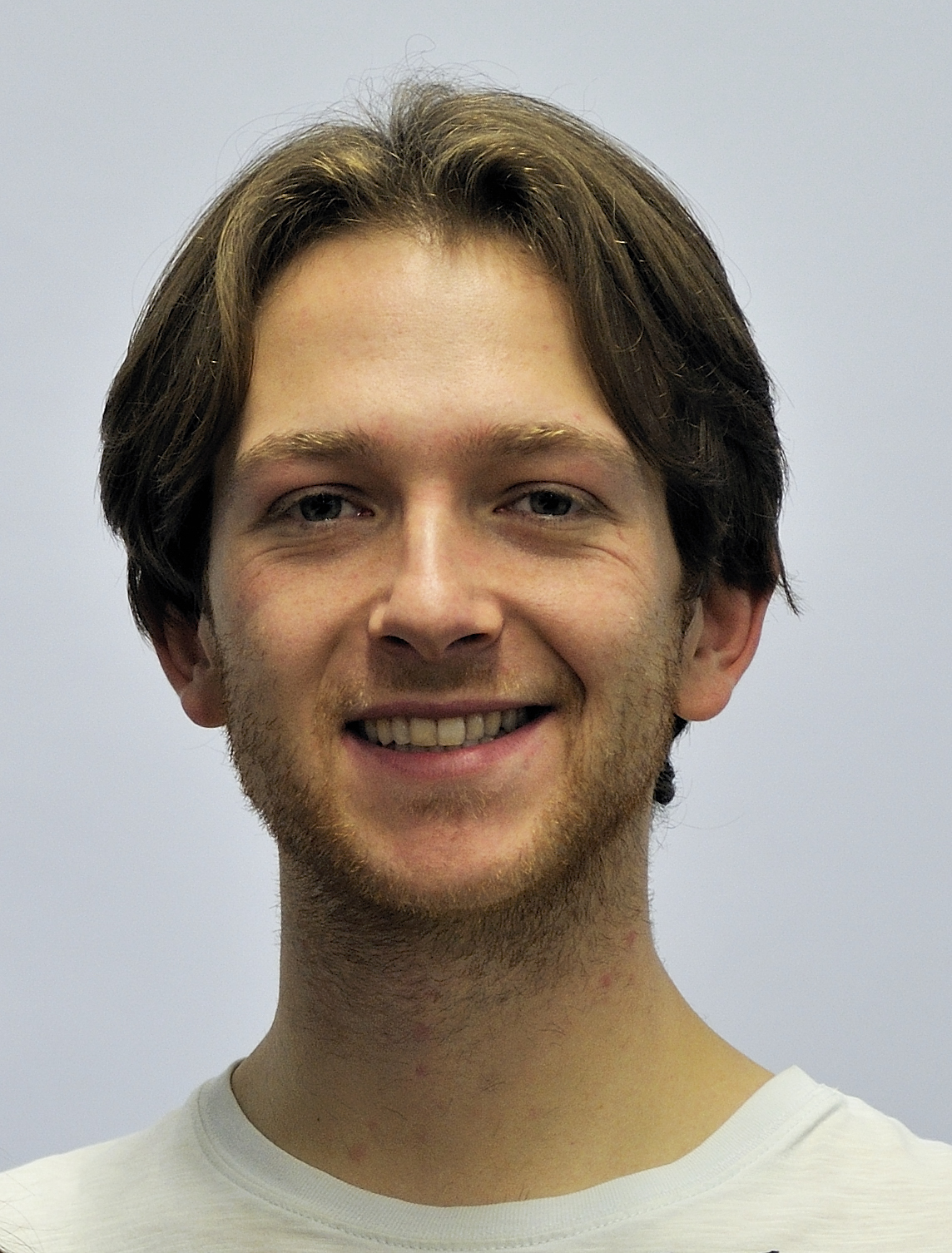
- Stefano Caruso in 2014

Personal information
- Born: 19 April 1987 (age 39) Rome, Italy
- Home town: Milan, Italy
- Height: 1.80 m (5 ft 11 in)

Figure skating career
- Country: Germany
- Coach: Barbara Fusar-Poli, René Lohse, Martin Skotnický
- Skating club: TSC Berlin
- Began skating: 1996

Medal record
Representing Italy
Italian Championships
| Bronze medal – third place | 2009 Pinerolo | Ice dance |

Stefano Caruso (born 19 April 1987) is a former competitive ice dancer with dual German and Italian citizenship. Representing Germany with Tanja Kolbe, he won seven international medals and two German national silver medals. They placed eighth at the 2013 European Championships and competed at the 2014 Winter Olympics, finishing 19th. Earlier in his career, Caruso competed for Italy with Isabella Pajardi.

== Personal life ==
Stefano Caruso was born on 19 April 1987 in Rome, Italy, to a Hungarian mother and a father from Naples. He moved to Milan in 2000. He studied languages and communication in Bergamo. In September 2013, he became a German citizen while retaining his Italian citizenship. In January 2014, he began working for the Bundeswehr's sports group.

== Career ==
=== Early career ===
Caruso started skating as an eight-year-old in Mentana, Rome. He trained in ice dance from the start and teamed up with Isabella Pajardi in 2000. They won the 2008 Italian national junior title and placed 9th at the 2008 World Junior Championships. After they split up in 2010, Caruso had tryouts with an American, Isabella Tobias, and a Canadian.

=== Partnership with Kolbe ===
Caruso teamed up with Tanja Kolbe in 2010 to represent Germany. In their first season together, they took bronze at the 2010 Ice Challenge and at the 2011 German Championships.

In their second season together, Kolbe/Caruso won two international medals, gold at the 2011 NRW Trophy and bronze at the Istanbul Cup. They took the silver medal at the German Championships and were assigned to the 2012 European Championships, where they finished 12th. The duo split up after the event but teamed up again in July 2012.

In the 2012–13 season, Kolbe/Caruso took silver again at the German Championships and earned another trip to the European Championships where they finished 8th. They won two international medals – bronze at both the New Year's Cup and Volvo Open Cup.

In the 2013–14 season, Kolbe/Caruso were invited to their first Grand Prix event, the 2013 Trophee Eric Bompard, where they placed 7th. They added two more international medals to their collection – bronze at the 2013 Ondrej Nepela Trophy and Ice Challenge. In February 2014, Kolbe/Caruso competed at the Winter Olympics in Sochi and finished 19th. They announced the end of their partnership in June 2014.

=== Post-competitive career ===
After ending his competitive career in 2014, Caruso began a coaching partnership with Barbara Fusar-Poli at Milan's Agorà ice rink.

== Programs ==
=== With Kolbe ===
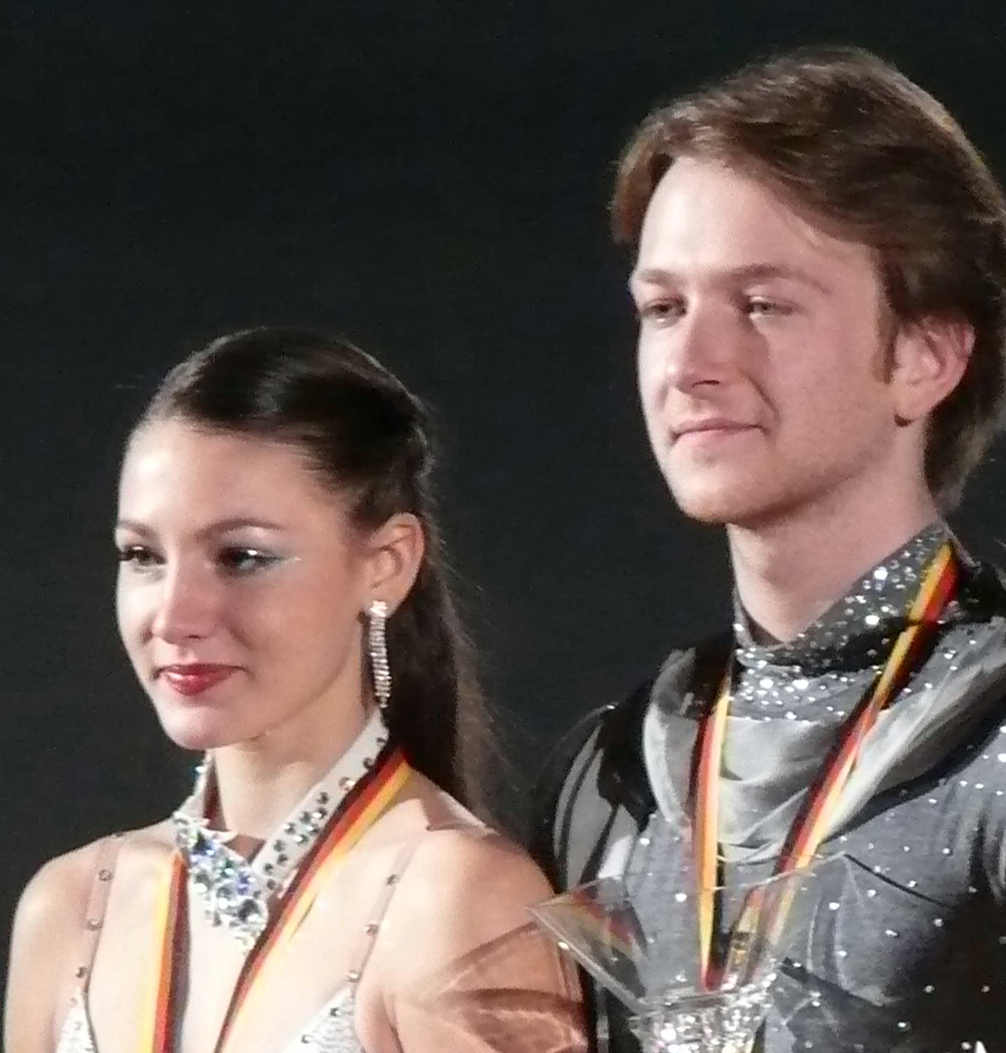
Kolbe/Caruso at the 2012 German Championships

| Season | Short dance | Free dance |
|---|---|---|
| 2013–2014 | New York, New York performed by Liza Minnelli, Luciano Pavarotti; Borsalino performed by Tokyo Hosei Orchestra; New York, New York performed by Liza Minnelli, Luciano Pavarotti | Enchanted by Alan Menken: Narissa Arrives; Storybook Ending; Andalasia |
| 2012–2013 | La Foule by Édith Piaf; French Can Can (from Gaite Parisienne) by Jacques Offenbach | Beethoven's Last Night by Trans-Siberian Orchestra: Overture – Moonlight Sonata; Dream of Candlelight; Moonlight Sonata |
| 2011–2012 | Bla Bla Cha Cha by Petty Booka; Besame Mucho; Give It Up by The Goodman | Love Story by Francis Lai; Summer of '42 by Michel Legrand |
| 2010–2011 | Que Sera, Sera by Doris Day; Sugar by Alma Cogan | Tore My Heart by Oona; Man's World by Natacha Atlas |

=== With Pajardi ===
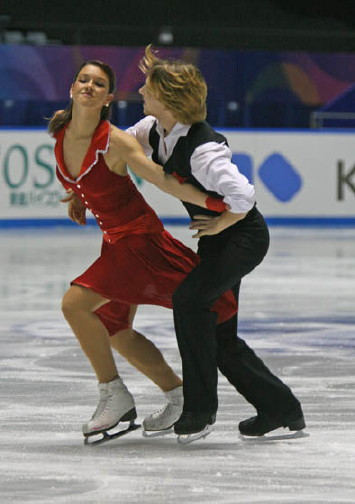
Pajardi and Caruso at the 2008 NHK Trophy.

| Season | Original dance | Free dance |
|---|---|---|
| 2009–2010 | Italian folk: Reginella by Massimo Ranieri; Tarantella Napoletana | Canone Inverso by Ennio Morricone; Concerto Grosso No. 1 – Tengo Allegro by New Trous |
| 2008–2009 | Baciami Piccina by Ray Gelato; New Orleans Blues by Ella Fitzgerald; Baciami Piccina by Ray Gelato | Romeo and Juliet by Sergei Prokofiev; Art of War by Vanessa-Mae (based on Romeo and Juliet by Sergei Prokofiev); Un Giorno Per Noi performed by Josh Groban |
| 2007–2008 | Torna Surriento; Tarantella by Claudio Villa | Notre-Dame de Paris by Riccardo Cocciante: Les Sans-Papiers; Belle; Le Temps des Cathedrales |

== Competitive highlights ==
GP = Grand Prix; JGP = Junior Grand Prix

=== With Kolbe for Germany ===
International
| Event | 2010–11 | 2011–12 | 2012–13 | 2013–14 |
|---|---|---|---|---|
| Winter Olympics | | | | 19th |
| World Champ. | | | | 21st |
| European Champ. | | 12th | 8th | 11th |
| GP Trophee Bompard | | | | 7th |
| Bavarian Open | | | 4th | |
| Cup of Nice | | 4th | | |
| Finlandia Trophy | | 6th | | |
| Golden Spin | 7th | 6th | 5th | |
| Ice Challenge | 3rd | | | 3rd |
| Istanbul Cup | | 3rd | | |
| New Year's Cup | | | 3rd | |
| NRW Trophy | 8th | 1st | | |
| Ondrej Nepela | | | | 3rd |
| Pavel Roman | 4th | | | |
| Volvo Open Cup | | | 3rd | |
National
| German Champ. | 3rd | 2nd | 2nd | 2nd |

=== With Pajardi for Italy ===
International
| Event | 02–03 | 03–04 | 04–05 | 05–06 | 06–07 | 07–08 | 08–09 | 09–10 |
|---|---|---|---|---|---|---|---|---|
| Europeans | | | | | | | 16th | |
| GP NHK Trophy | | | | | | | 10th | |
| Nebelhorn | | | | | | | | 10th |
| Golden Spin | | | | | | | 5th | |
| Universiade | | | | | | | 9th | |
International: Junior
| Junior Worlds | | | | | | 9th | | |
| JGP Final | | | | | | 7th | | |
| JGP Austria | | | | | | 3rd | | |
| JGP Bulgaria | | | | | | 1st | | |
| JGP Czech Rep. | | 10th | | | 8th | | | |
| JGP France | | | | | 11th | | | |
| JGP Poland | | | | 11th | | | | |
| JGP Pavel Roman | 11th | | 5th | | | | | |
National
| Italian Champ. | 6th J | | 4th J | 3rd J | 3rd J | 1st J | 3rd | |
J = Junior level
