= Torvill and Dean =

English ice skating duo

Jayne Torvill and Christopher Dean
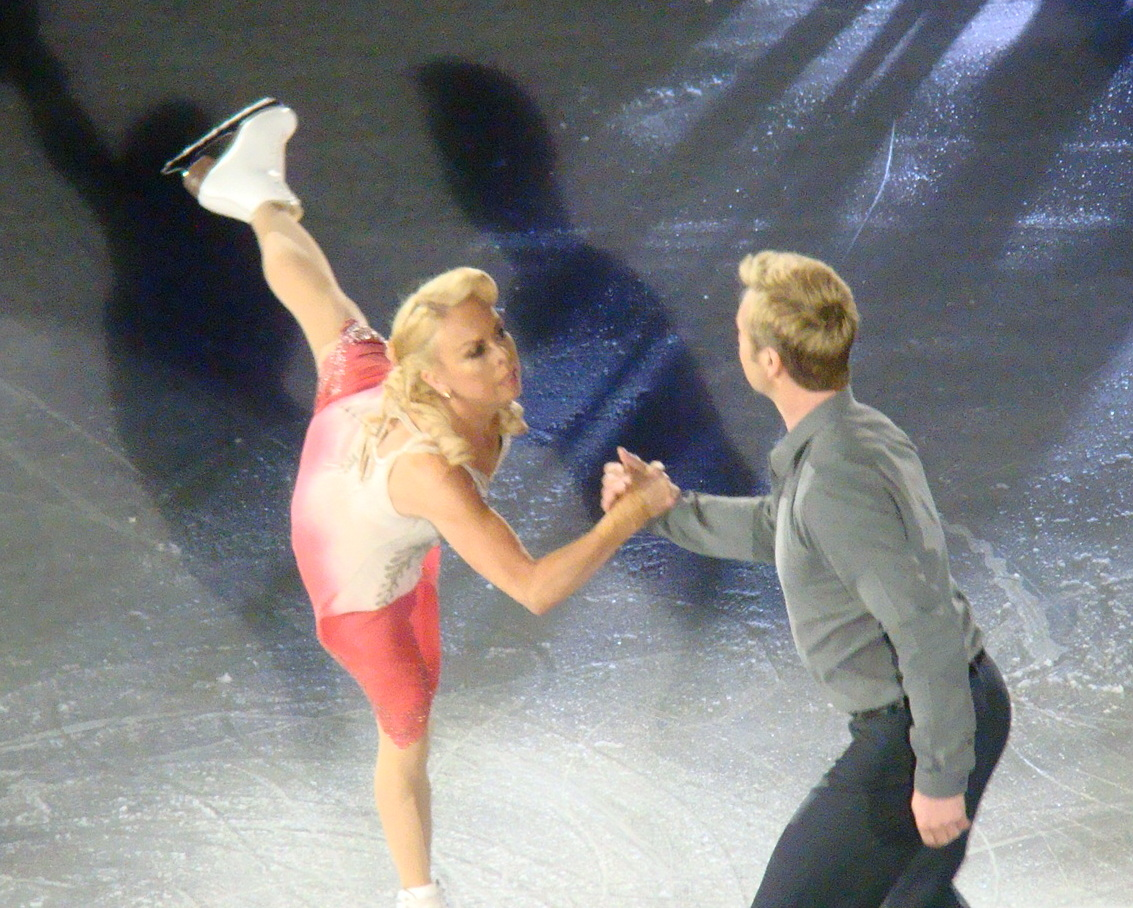
- Torvill and Dean on the Dancing on Ice tour in Manchester, 2012

Personal information
- Born: Nottingham

Figure skating career
- Country: Great Britain
- Retired: 1984, 1994 (amateur), 1998 (professional)
Medal record
Figure skating: ice dancing
Representing Great Britain
Olympic Games
Gold medal – first place	1984 Sarajevo	Ice dancing
Bronze medal – third place	1994 Lillehammer	Ice dancing
World Championships
Gold medal – first place	1981 Hartford	Ice dancing
Gold medal – first place	1982 Copenhagen	Ice dancing
Gold medal – first place	1983 Helsinki	Ice dancing
Gold medal – first place	1984 Ottawa	Ice dancing
European Championships
Gold medal – first place	1981 Innsbruck	Ice dancing
Gold medal – first place	1982 Lyon	Ice dancing
Gold medal – first place	1984 Budapest	Ice dancing
Gold medal – first place	1994 Copenhagen	Ice dancing
British Figure Skating Championships
Bronze medal – third place	1977 Nottingham	Ice dancing
Gold medal – first place	1978 Nottingham	Ice dancing
Gold medal – first place	1979 Nottingham	Ice dancing
Gold medal – first place	1980 Nottingham	Ice dancing
Gold medal – first place	1981 Nottingham	Ice dancing
Gold medal – first place	1982 Nottingham	Ice dancing
Gold medal – first place	1983 Nottingham	Ice dancing
Gold medal – first place	1994 Sheffield	Ice dancing

Torvill and Dean (Jayne Torvill and Christopher Dean) are British ice dancers and former British, European, Olympic, and World champions.

At the Sarajevo 1984 Winter Olympics the pair won gold and became the highest-scoring figure skaters of all time for a single programme, receiving twelve perfect 6.0s and six 5.9s which included artistic impression scores of 6.0 from every judge, after skating to Maurice Ravel's Boléro. One of the most-watched television events ever in the United Kingdom, their 1984 Olympics performance was watched by a British television audience of more than 24 million people. The couple went on to record an even higher score at the 1984 World Championships, thirteen 6.0s and five 5.9s.

The pair turned professional following the 1984 World Championships, regaining amateur status briefly ten years later in 1994 to compete in the Olympics once again. The pair retired from competitive skating for good in 1998 when they toured one last time with their own show, Ice Adventures, before rejoining Stars on Ice for one more season. Their final routine was performed to Paul Simon's "Still Crazy After All These Years", a routine they had devised a few years earlier for competition. Although remaining close friends, the pair did not skate together again until they were enticed out of retirement to take part in ITV's Dancing on Ice. Their career was portrayed in the 2018 biographical film Torvill & Dean.

Both are from Nottingham, England, where the National Ice Centre is accessed through a public area known as Bolero Square, in honour of the pair's Olympic achievements. In July 2025, the NIC also renamed the rink to the 'Torvill & Dean Rink'. There is also a housing estate in the Wollaton area of the city with streets named 'Torvill Drive' and 'Dean Close', with many of the surrounding roads named after coaches and dances associated with the pair. In a UK poll conducted by Channel 4 in 2002, the British public voted Torvill and Dean's winning performance at the 1984 Winter Olympics as Number 8 in the list of the 100 Greatest Sporting Moments.

== Careers ==
=== Partnership and the Olympics ===
Around 1975, Jayne Torvill was a British Junior Pairs champion, and Christopher Dean and his partner had won a British Junior Ice Dance competition. Nottingham coach Janet Sawbridge put them together, and shortly afterwards, they started their ice dancing history. They took their first trophy in 1976. They changed coaches to Betty Callaway in 1979. After a 5th-place finish at their first Olympic Games, in Lake Placid in the 1980 Winter Olympics, and 4th place in the Worlds that year, they never took lower than first place in any competition they entered except the 1994 Winter Olympics.

Singer-actor Michael Crawford was the fourth member of the team, along with their trainer. He became a mentor to them around 1981, and went on to help them create their 1983 and 1984 Olympic routines, and "taught them how to act". Crawford said of them, "I found them to be delightful young people, the kind you want to help if you can." (The Times November 1982). He was present with their trainer at the ringside, when the team won their perfect Olympics score with their Boléro routine.

=== Going professional ===
Although Torvill and Dean had been able to leave their jobs as an insurance book clerk and policeman, respectively—thanks to grants from the City of Nottingham—they were not allowed to earn any money from skating as long as they wished to remain eligible for the Olympics. Turning professional in 1984, they took advantage not only of the financial but of the artistic possibilities of their new status. They worked with Australian dance choreographer Graeme Murphy at first, and they were able to create not only routines for themselves but entire ice shows with a thematic coherence, which toured Australia, the U.S., and Europe. Their projects included a filmed fairy tale "Fire and Ice." In general, Dean would imagine the sequence he wanted to perform, and Torvill would work with him to refine it technically. They choreographed, as a team, for other ice dancers and skaters, particularly the Canadian brother–sister team Isabelle and Paul Duchesnay, who skated for France at the Albertville 1992 Winter Olympics, taking the silver medal with their West Side Story routine.

=== Return to the Olympics ===
After ten years as professionals, Torvill and Dean decided to return to the amateur arena for the 1994 Olympics in Lillehammer, Norway (along with other great skaters of the 1980s, such as Brian Boitano and Katarina Witt, following a change in eligibility rules). The couple moved to Hamar, Norway, in 1993 to practise at the Hamar Olympic Amphitheatre which hosted the figure skating events. Their free dance was designed to re-establish some of the ideas about ice dance which they themselves had been instrumental in dismantling; "Let's Face The Music and Dance" had no swooning lovers, theatrical accessories, or strong ideological message; instead, the emphasis was upon pure, light-hearted dance in the Astaire and Rogers tradition.

The routine did have one move, an assisted lift, which pushed the envelope of the rules, though they had danced the routine at the European Championships with no indication from the judges of any problems. According to their joint autobiography, Facing the Music, the lift was technically legal because the rule prohibited lifts "above the shoulders," and the lift they used was not above the shoulders. The judges placed Torvill and Dean third, giving the second to perennial silver medalists Usova and Zhulin, and the gold medal to Grishuk and Platov, who continued to win gold through the next four years.

=== Life after the Olympics ===
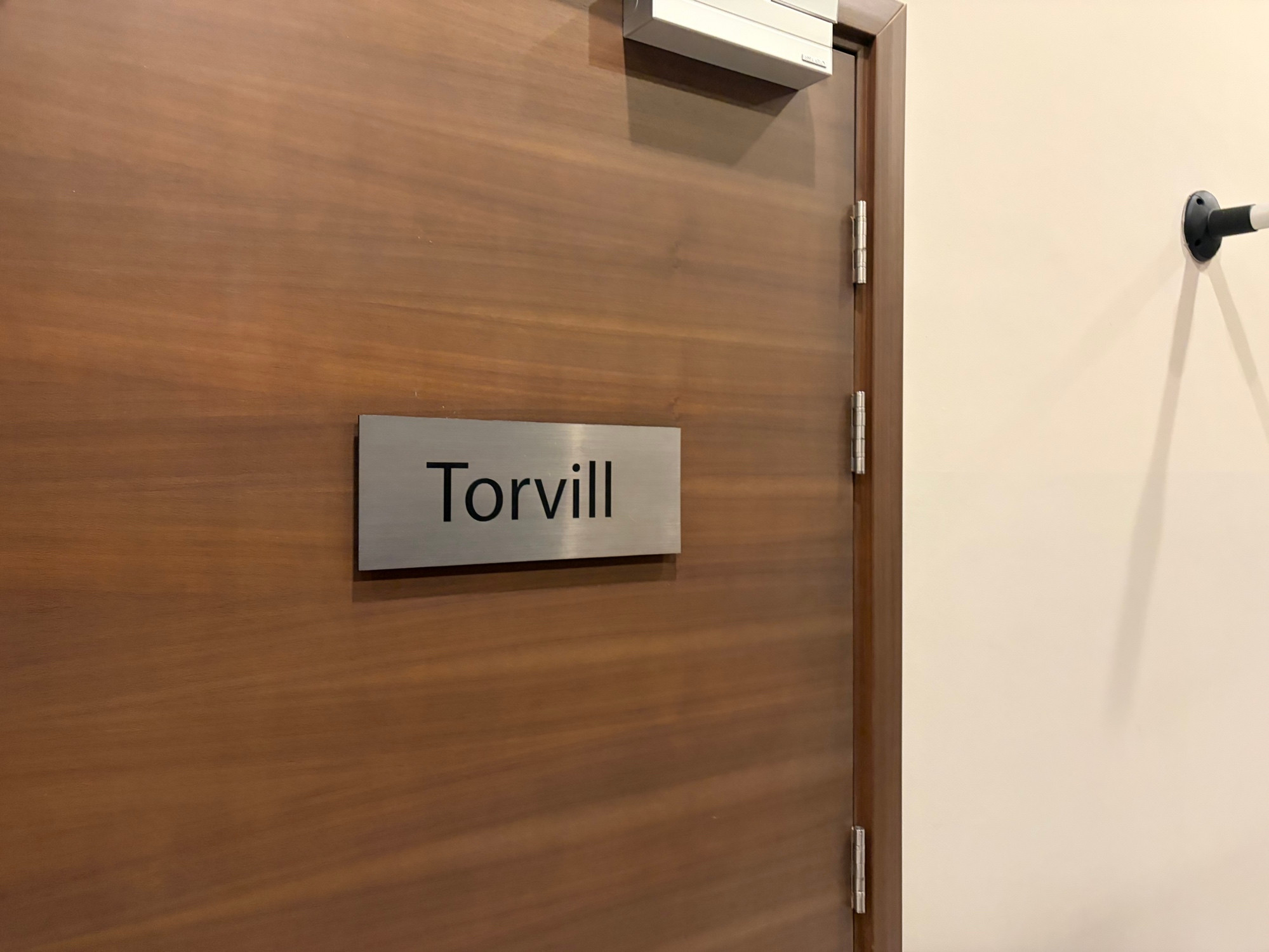
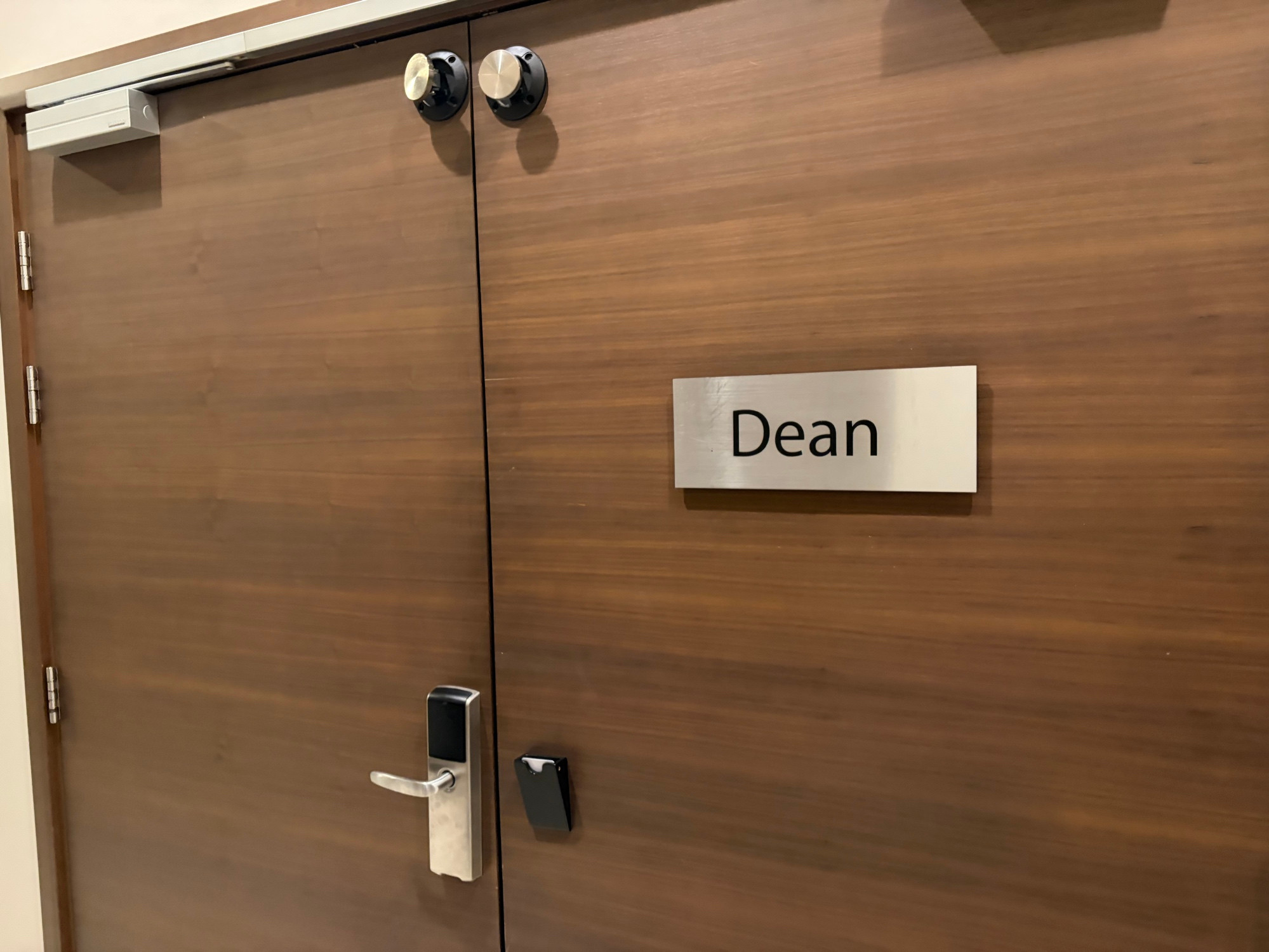
Rooms at the Marriott Sarajevo hotel, one named "Torvill", the other "Dean"

After the disappointing finish at Lillehammer, Torvill and Dean "retired from competitive skating" on 2 March 1994. Instead, they continued with their planned and very successful "Face the Music" tour, to be followed by numerous other projects: Dean choreographed a suite of dances to the songs of Paul Simon for the English National Ballet, professional competitions, touring with Stars on Ice, and collaborating with cellist Yo-Yo Ma and director Patricia Rozema on the video Inspired by Bach: Six Gestures. In late 1998, they produced an ice show at Wembley Stadium in London, "Ice Adventures," which included a "flying" ice ballet and other wonders. In the meantime, they were still choreographing, notably for the dynamic French Ice Dance team, Anissina and Peizerat, who won first place in the World Championships in 2000.

In 1998, the pair officially retired, each continuing to coach and choreograph separately. Since 2006, they have acted as coaches, choreographers and performers in ITV's Dancing on Ice and its Australian version Torvill and Dean's Dancing on Ice. The ITV show returned for a fifth series in January 2010. After the 2007 and 2008 UK series of Dancing on Ice, Torvill and Dean took the show on the road for a British tour; a similar tour, the "25th Anniversary" (of their Sarajevo Olympic success) took place in 2009.

In 2014, Torvill and Dean returned to Sarajevo to dance the Bolero one more time, celebrating the 30-year anniversary of their Olympics performance. Invited by the mayor of Sarajevo ahead of the Youth Olympic Games in 2017, the event helped raise funds for a permanent ice rink and reminded the world of their efforts to bring back the Olympics to Sarajevo. 2015 saw Torvill and Dean make their pantomime début at the Manchester Opera House, performing in "Cinderella".

Since 2018, they have been Head Judges on Dancing on Ice, alongside Judges Ashley Banjo and Oti Mabuse.

On 14 February 2024, it was announced that 2025 would be their final time skating together, before they would be retiring at the end of their final UK tour which ran from April to May 2025. It has also been confirmed that a new documentary titled Torvill and Dean: The Ice Skating Years is set to be produced by ITN Productions with Jonathan Kydd as narrator and air on Sky Documentaries sometime in 2026.

== Style and approach ==
=== Use of narrative and thematic music ===
After winning the 1981 World Figure Skating Championships (which brought the distinction of MBEs), and with three more years before the Olympics, they began to plan routines which used a single piece of music and had some narrative or thematic element. At that time, Ice Dance "long" routines typically used several pieces of music, often with different rhythms to show off the command of different steps (thus their Free Dance in 1981 used "Fame", "Caravan", "Red Sails in the Sunset", and "Sing, Sing, Sing"); the Original Set Pattern dance used only one piece of music, but the entire routine had to be performed three times in sequence, exactly the same way.

In 1982, they presented a long programme to the overture from the musical Mack and Mabel, which evoked the emotions of a sweet but stormy romance; at the World Championships in 1983, they enacted a visit to the circus with music from Barnum, a performance which brought them the honour of receiving the world's first perfect score, with help from the stage show's star, Michael Crawford; in 1984, at the Olympics, they stunned the world with Boléro, and also with their dramatic Paso Doble (Capriccio Espagnol) short routine, in which Torvill was the bullfighter's cape. They had learned to choose and edit music carefully and design routines that were appealing both technically and imaginatively, and their completeness of presentation included thematically appropriate costumes.

In 1989, during the duo's visit to Australia, they recorded an album Here We Stand, produced by Kevin Stanton with arrangements by Warwick Bone and Derek Williams, and recorded while Christopher Dean was laid up in Sydney, recuperating from a torn ligament. Sales of the album were poor, and this may have been due to the fact that the album featured the dancers singing the material ghosted by backing vocalists, instead of the music they danced to, however it survives on iTunes.

=== Complying with Olympic rules ===
Torvill and Dean's 1984 Olympic free dance was skated to Maurice Ravel's Boléro. Ravel's original Boléro composition is over 17 minutes long. Olympics rules state that the free dance must be four minutes long (plus or minus ten seconds). Torvill and Dean went to a music arranger to condense Boléro down to a "skateable" version. However, they were told that the minimum time that Boléro could be condensed down to was 4 minutes 28 seconds, 18 seconds in excess of the Olympics rules. Torvill and Dean reviewed the Olympic rule book and found that it stated that actual timing of a skating routine began when the skaters started skating. Therefore, they could use Boléro if they did not place their skates' blades to ice for the first 18 seconds. They timed the performance so that when Torvill first placed a blade on the ice, they would have the maximum skating time remaining.

== Competition results ==
=== Amateur ===
Event	75–76	76–77	77–78	78–79	79–80	80–81	81–82	82–83	83–84	84–93	93–94
Olympics					5th				1st	Pro Years	3rd
Worlds			11th	8th	4th	1st	1st	1st	1st	Pro Years	
Europeans			9th	6th	4th	1st	1st	WD	1st	Pro Years	1st
British Championships		4th	3rd	1st	1st	1st	1st	1st	1st	Pro Years	1st
NHK Trophy					2nd					Pro Years	
St Ivel International						1st	1st			Pro Years	
Oberstdorf		2nd	1st							Pro Years	
St Gervais		1st								Pro Years	
Morzine Trophy				2nd						Pro Years	
John Davis Trophy			1st							Pro Years	
Sheffield Trophy		1st								Pro Years	
Rotary Watches Competition				2nd						Pro Years	
Northern Championships	1st									Pro Years	
WD: Withdrew

==== Amateur dance routines ====
	OSP/ORD	Free Dance	Exhibitions
1978		The Great Waldo Pepper	
1979	Masquerade	Slaughter on Tenth Avenue	Evergreen
1980	A Little Street in Singapore	Sing Sing Sing etc.	Puttin' On the Ritz
1981	Cherry Pink (and Apple Blossom White)	Fame etc.	History of Love (version 1)
1982	Summertime	Mack and Mabel	The Hop, Kiss Me Kate, Fast Tap
1983	Rock n Roll	Barnum	Putting on the Ritz
1984	Paso Doble	Boléro	I Won't Send Roses
1994	History of Love (version 2)	Let's Face the Music	Boléro

=== Professional ===
Event	1984	1985	1990	1994	1995	1996
World Professional Championships	1st	1st	1st		1st	1st
Challenge of Champions			1st		1st	1st
World Team Championship				3rd	1st	1st

==== Professional dance routines ====
	1984	1985	1990	1994	1995	1996
World Professional Championships	Song of India, Encounter	Diablo Tango, Venus	Oscar Tango, Revolution / Imagine	Encounter	Still Crazy After All These Years, Cecilia	Take Five, Hat Trick
Challenge of Champions			Echoes of Ireland		Still Crazy After All These Years, Cecilia	Take Five, Hat Trick
World Team Championships				Let's Face the Music, Encounter	Bridge Over Troubled Water, Cecilia	Sarabande, Hat Trick

== Dancing on Ice performances ==
Torvill and Dean have performed several times during each TV series.

Series One (2006)

- "Let's Face the Music"
- Mack and Mabel & Barnum tributes
- "Viva Las Vegas"
- "Let Me Entertain You"
- "Foot Loose"
- "Angels"
- "Sing, Sing, Sing (With a Swing)"
- Boléro

Series Two (2007)

- "A Kind of Magic"
- "Imagine"
- "Diamonds Are a Girl's Best Friend"
- "I Like The Way (You Move)"
- "These Boots Are Made For Walkin'"
- "Shine"
- "Puttin' On the Ritz"
- "Moondance"
- "Over the Rainbow"
- Boléro Unplugged
- "Gold"

Series Three (2008)

- "Get the Party Started" (Shirley Bassey version)
- "Feelin' Good" (Michael Bublé version)
- "World of our Own"
- "One" (Jayne with ensemble)
- "Fields of Gold"
- Sixties-themed Group Number:- "Twist and Shout" (The Beatles version), "Dancing in the Street", "Hippy Hippy Shake" & "Shout!"
- "Valerie"
- "Sway" (The Pussycat Dolls version)
- "Footprints in the Sand"
- Boléro revisited (with Julian Lloyd Webber)
- "The Best Is Yet to Come"

Series Four (2009)

- "Swing with Me"
- "From A Distance" (with Bette Midler)
- "Wake Me Up Before You Go-Go" (Group Number)
- "Spice Up Your Life"
- "Let It Go" (with Will Young)
- "It's Raining Men" (Group Number)
- "Save the Last Dance for Me" (Michael Bublé version)
- "Untouchable" (with Girls Aloud)
- Boléro

Series Five (2010)

- Love Never Dies (with Katherine Jenkins)
- "Use Somebody" (with Pixie Lott)
- "Your Song" (with Ellie Goulding)
- "Haven't Met You Yet"
- Boléro

Series Six (2011)

- "Let's Get It Started"
- "Copacabana" (pros number)
- "Yellow" (with sand artist David Myriam)
- Argentine tango to "Dance With Me"
- "Why Do Fools Fall in Love" (The Overtones version)
- "What The World Needs Now Is Love" (sung by Rumer)
- Boléro (with David Garrett)

Series Seven (2012)

- "The Edge of Glory"
- "What Makes You Beautiful" (with One Direction)
- "Jar of Hearts" (with Christina Perri)
- Boléro

Series Eight (2013)

- "Spectrum (Say My Name)" (Calvin Harris remix)
- "Better Together"
- "Accentuate the Positive" (with Jools Holland's Rhythm Blues and Blues Orchestra and Rumer)
- "Never Tear Us Apart" (INXS version)
- Boléro

Series Nine (2014)

- "In My Life" (with Rebecca Ferguson)
- "The Power of Love"
- "Let's Face the Music and Dance"
- Boléro

Series Ten (2018)

- "The Impossible Dream (The Quest)"

Series Eleven (2019)

- "You've Got a Friend in Me"
- "Bridge Over Troubled Water"

Series Twelve (2020)

- "Just the Two of Us"
- "One Day Like This"

Series Thirteen (2021)

- "Me and My Shadow"
- "Stand by Me"
- "Fly Me to the Moon"

Series Fourteen (2022)

- "Lucy in the Sky with Diamonds"
- "Come Dance with Me"

== Docudrama ==
In July 2018, it was announced that Torvill & Dean, a biographical film docudrama, had been commissioned by ITV, written by William Ivory and produced by Darlow Smithson. The movie was broadcast on 25 December 2018, with Will Tudor playing Dean, and Poppy Lee Friar playing Torvill. Nottingham actress Cassie Bradley performed as Leanne, Dean's first partner. Bradley performed all her own skating for the role.
