= Penny Coomes =

English ice dancer

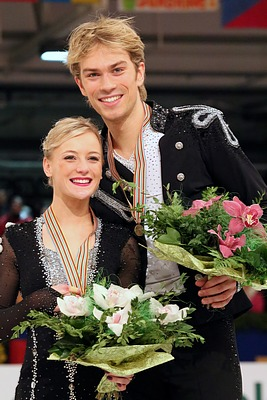
- Coomes and Buckland at the 2014 European Championships

Personal information
- Born: 6 April 1989 (age 37) Ascot, England
- Height: 1.52 m (5 ft 0 in)

Figure skating career
- Country: Great Britain
- Discipline: Ice dance
- Partner: Nicholas Buckland
- Coach: Igor Shpilband
- Skating club: National Ice Centre Nottingham
- Retired: 2018
Medal record
Figure skating: Ice dancing
Representing Great Britain
European Championships
Bronze medal – third place	2014 Budapest	Ice dancing

Penny Coomes (born 6 April 1989) is a former English competitive ice dancer who represented Great Britain. With partner Nicholas Buckland, she is the 2014 European Figure Skating Championships bronze medalist and has won six other international medals. They are also five-time British national champions (2012, 2013, 2014, 2016 and 2018), and have competed three times at the Winter Olympics, in 2010, 2014 and 2018.

== Personal life ==
Coomes was born on 6 April 1989 in Maidenhead, England. She attended Wessex Primary School and Cox Green Secondary before moving to Nottingham. She learned ballet at Desborough School. She studied psychology at Nottingham Trent University. She is the stepdaughter of ice dancing coach, Philip Askew. Coomes has been in a relationship with ice dance partner, Nicholas Buckland, for many years. On 24 December 2018, Coomes announced their engagement. The couple have two children.

== Competitive career ==
Coomes was introduced to skating by her mother at the age of eight at Slough Ice Arena.

=== Seasons: 2005–06 to 2009–10 ===
Coomes teamed up with Nicholas Buckland in 2005, having met him at the National Ice Centre in Nottingham. In the 2007–08 season, Coomes injured her foot in a collision with another skater at the British Championships. Told it was not broken, she and Buckland went on to win the national junior title. Three months later, a scan indicated a broken cuboid bone, leading to a bone graft and reconstructive surgery.

Coomes/Buckland made their senior international debut at the 2008 Finlandia Trophy, placing 9th. Their season ended after Coomes sustained a head injury in a fall on the ice. In the 2009–10 season, they placed 9th at the Ice Challenge in Graz, Austria, and fourth at the 2009 Ondrej Nepela Memorial. They won the silver medal at the British Championships and then won the bronze medal at the 2009 Golden Spin of Zagreb.

Coomes/Buckland trained at the National Ice Centre in Nottingham until December 2009 when they moved to New Jersey to train with coach Evgeni Platov. Along with Sinead Kerr / John Kerr, they were selected to represent Great Britain at the 2010 Winter Olympics in Vancouver. On 13 February 2010, Buckland began experiencing symptoms of tachycardia. She and Buckland finished 20th at the Olympics.

=== Seasons: 2010–11 to 2013–14 ===
In the 2010–11 season, they withdrew from their national championships after a fall in training resulted in a sprained ligament in Coomes' left knee. The two finished 14th at the European Championships and 16th at the World Championships.

In 2011–12, Coomes/Buckland placed fourth at their Grand Prix event, the 2011 Cup of China, before winning silver at the 2011 Golden Spin of Zagreb and gold at the Toruń Cup. The duo ranked sixth at the 2012 European Championships in Sheffield, England. They placed 14th at the 2012 World Championships in Nice, France. Coomes sustained a back and hip injury in Nice.

In 2012–13, they were fifth at the 2013 European Championships in Zagreb and 13th at the 2013 World Championships in London, Ontario. In July 2013, a device was implanted under Buckland's skin in order to monitor his heart rhythm.

In 2013–14, Coomes/Buckland won gold at the Ondrej Nepela Trophy in Bratislava. Following the event, Buckland was informed that he needed an operation due to readings of up to 270–280 beats per minute. In November 2013, a nerve in his heart was cauterized in a successful procedure leading to normal functioning of his heart. Coomes/Buckland went on to win the bronze medal at the 2014 European Championships in Budapest. They placed tenth at the 2014 Winter Olympics in Sochi.

=== 2014–15 season ===
Coomes/Buckland began the 2014–15 season with gold medals at the 2014 International Cup of Nice and NRW Trophy. In November, they were awarded the first Grand Prix medal of their career, bronze at the 2014 Rostelecom Cup. At their next GP event, the 2014 NHK Trophy, they placed second in the short dance but sixth in the free dance, slipping to fifth overall.

In late January 2015, Coomes/Buckland placed tenth in the short dance at the European Championships in Stockholm. They withdrew prior to the next segment, Buckland having fallen ill with gastroenteritis. Coomes developed an illness in the third week of March, resulting in her hospitalization and the team's withdrawal from the 2015 World Championships, to be held in Shanghai the following week. Back in the United Kingdom, she was diagnosed with nonspecific interstitial pneumonia.

=== 2015–16 season ===
In May 2015, Coomes/Buckand announced that they would be coached by Igor Shpilband in Michigan, following a directive by UK Sport, their funding agency. In October, they won silver at Ondrej Nepela Trophy, their first medal at an ISU Challenger Series competition. They placed 4th at the 2015 Trophée Éric Bompard, 5th at the 2015 NHK Trophy, 6th at the 2016 European Championships in Bratislava, and 7th at the 2016 World Championships in Boston.

=== 2016–17 season ===
Coomes fractured her patella on 24 June 2016, having fallen while trying a new lift entry with Buckland in Novi, Michigan; she underwent surgery four days later, wore a brace for ten weeks, and returned to the ice on 11 November. Coomes/Buckland withdrew from their Grand Prix assignments – the 2016 Trophée de France and 2016 NHK Trophy. They trained in preparation for the 2017 European Championships but later decided to withdraw. Coomes underwent an operation on 10 January 2017 to remove the wires in her knee, which were digging into the patellar tendon, and was expected to be off the ice for three months.

=== 2017–18 season ===
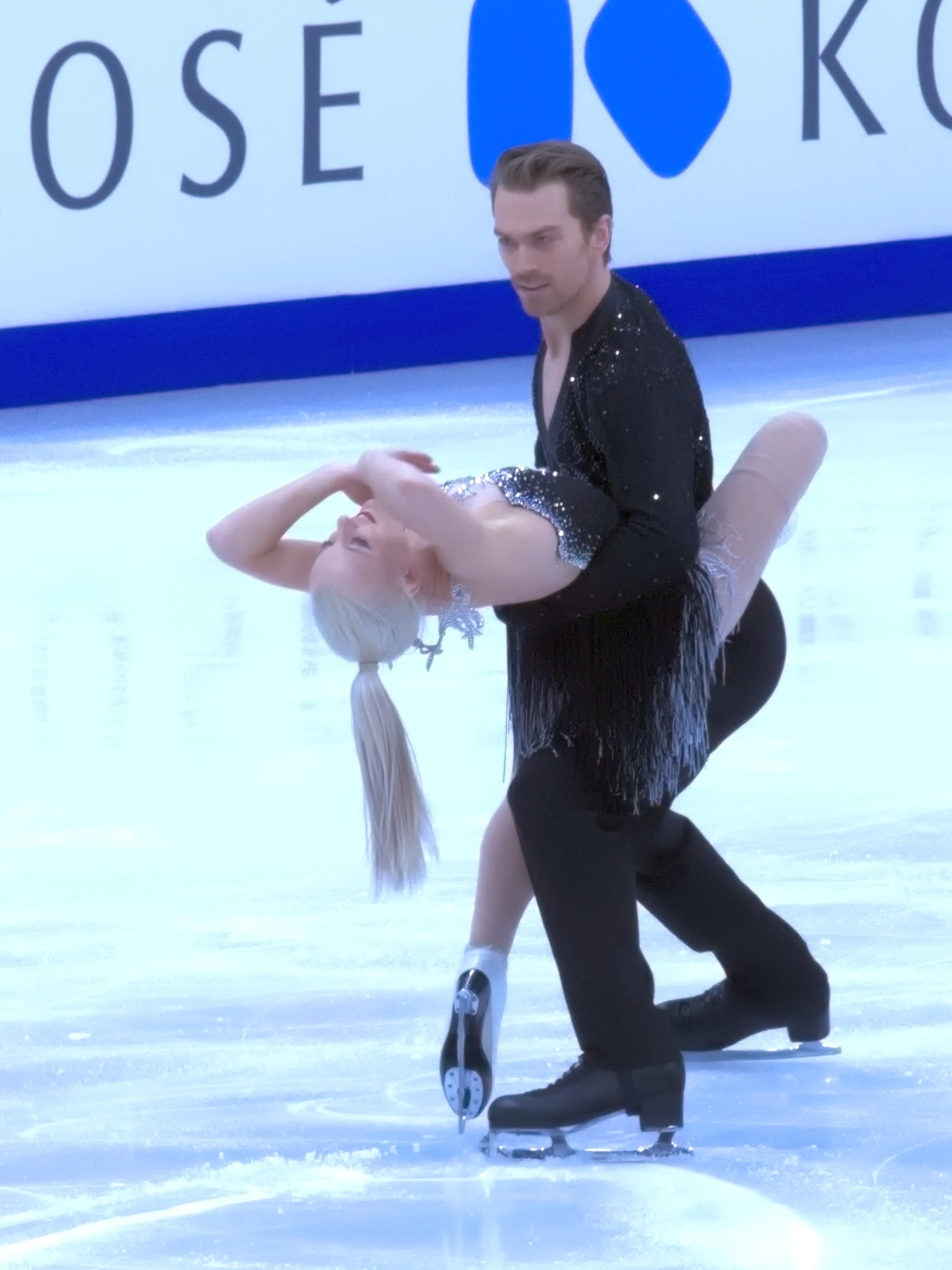
Coomes and Buckland at the 2018 Europeans Championships

Coomes and Buckland started their 2017–18 season at the 2017 CS Nebelhorn Trophy, where they won the gold medal, set new personal bests in all segments and qualified an Olympic spot for Great Britain in ice dance at the 2018 games. They were assigned to the 2017 NHK Trophy in November due to a withdrawal from the competition where they placed 5th in the short dance and 9th in the free dance, finishing in 7th overall.

Coomes and Buckland started in the 2018 Winter Olympics in Pyeongchang, South Korea, their third appearance at the Winter Olympics. On 19 February 2018, they finished in 10th place and received a scored of 68.36 for their short ice dance. On 20 February 2018, they finished in 10th place and received a scored of 101.96 in their free ice dance, and overall finished in 11th place with a 170.32 final score.

In 2018, it was announced that Coomes and Buckland, would not be attending the 2018 World Figure Skating Championships, in order to give Coomes the opportunity to fully rehabilitate her knee.

In 2018, Coomes and Buckland worked as stunt doubles and consultants on television drama Torvill and Dean, based on the true story of Jayne Torvill and Christopher Dean. It was broadcast on UK television on 25 December 2018.

== Coaching career ==
Following Coomes and Buckland's retirement from competitive ice dance, the pair settled in New Jersey, United States and began coaching at the arena, where their former coach, Evgeni Platov, used to train them. As of 2024, they are primarily based Aston, Pennsylvania.

Their students have included Phebe Bekker/James Hernandez and Natalia Pallu-Neves/Jayin Panesar.

== Programs ==
=== Ice dance with Nicholas Buckland ===
Season	Short dance	Free dance	Exhibition
2017–2018	Rumba: Rumba d'Amour choreo. by Christopher Dean; Samba: Batucada by DJ Dero	Exogenesis: Symphony, Part 1; Butterflies and Hurricanes by Muse; Battle Remembered by Yo-Yo Ma and The Silk Road Ensemble	
2016–2017		Not shown in competition: Battle Remembered by Yo-Yo Ma and The Silk Road Ensemble	
2015–2016	Waltz: My Sweet and Tender Beast by Eugen Doga; Polka: The Bartered Bride by Bedřich Smetana	Exogenesis: Symphony, Part 1; Butterflies and Hurricanes by Muse	Megamix by Michael Jackson
2014–2015	Flamenco: Malagdena & Poeta; Paso doble: Poeta en el Mar	Exogenesis: Symphony, Part 1; Butterflies and Hurricanes by Muse	
2013–2014	I Won't Dance by Fred Astaire; Swing Set by Jurassic 5; I Won't Dance by Fred Astaire	Immortal by Michael Jackson; Remember the Time; Smooth Criminal; You Are Not Alone; Billie Jean; Megamix	
2012–2013	Polka: Scalliwag by Gaelic Storm; Waltz: Stolen Kiss by Niamh Fahy; Polka: Rhythms of the Fall	Red Alert; Do Your Thing by Basement Jaxx vs Metropol Orkest	
2011–2012	El Beso Del Final by Christina Aguilera; Let's Get Loud by Jennifer Lopez	Viva Elvis by Cirque du Soleil	Fix You by Coldplay
2010–2011	La Valse d'Amélie by Yann Tiersen; Tango de los Exilados by Vanessa-Mae, Walter Taieb	The Lion King; Simba Confronts Scar; King of Pride Rock; Circle of Life by Elton John, Tim Rice	
		Original dance	
2009–2010	Irish folk dance: Reel Around the Sun; The Countess Cathleen by Bill Whelan	Pavane by Myleene Klass; Sarabande by Escala	
2007–2008	Spanish flamenco	Requiem for a Dream by Clint Mansell	

== Competitive highlights ==
=== Ice dance with Nicholas Buckland ===
International
Event	05–06	06–07	07–08	08–09	09–10	10–11	11–12	12–13	13–14	14–15	15–16	17–18
Olympics					20th				10th			11th
Worlds						16th	14th	13th	9th		7th	
Europeans					16th	14th	6th	5th	3rd	WD	6th	7th
GP Cup of China							4th					
GP NHK Trophy						8th		6th		5th	5th	7th
GP Rostelecom								7th		3rd		
GP Skate America						8th						
GP Trophée Éric Bompard									7th		4th	
CS Nebelhorn Trophy												1st
CS Ondrej Nepela Memorial					4th	4th			1st		2nd	
Bavarian Open								1st			1st	
Cup of Nice						3rd				1st		1st
Finlandia Trophy				9th								
Golden Spin				WD	3rd		2nd					
Ice Challenge					9th							
NRW Trophy										1st		
Mentor Toruń Cup							1st					
U.S. Classic									5th			
Winter Universiade				15th								
International: Junior
World Junior Championships			25th									
JGP Germany			13th									
JGP Great Britain			10th									
National
British Champ.	5th J	2nd J	1st J		2nd	WD	1st	1st	1st		1st	1st
Team events
Olympics									10th T			
Team Challenge; Cup											2nd T 4th P	
