= James Hernandez (figure skater) =

British ice dancer (born 2001)

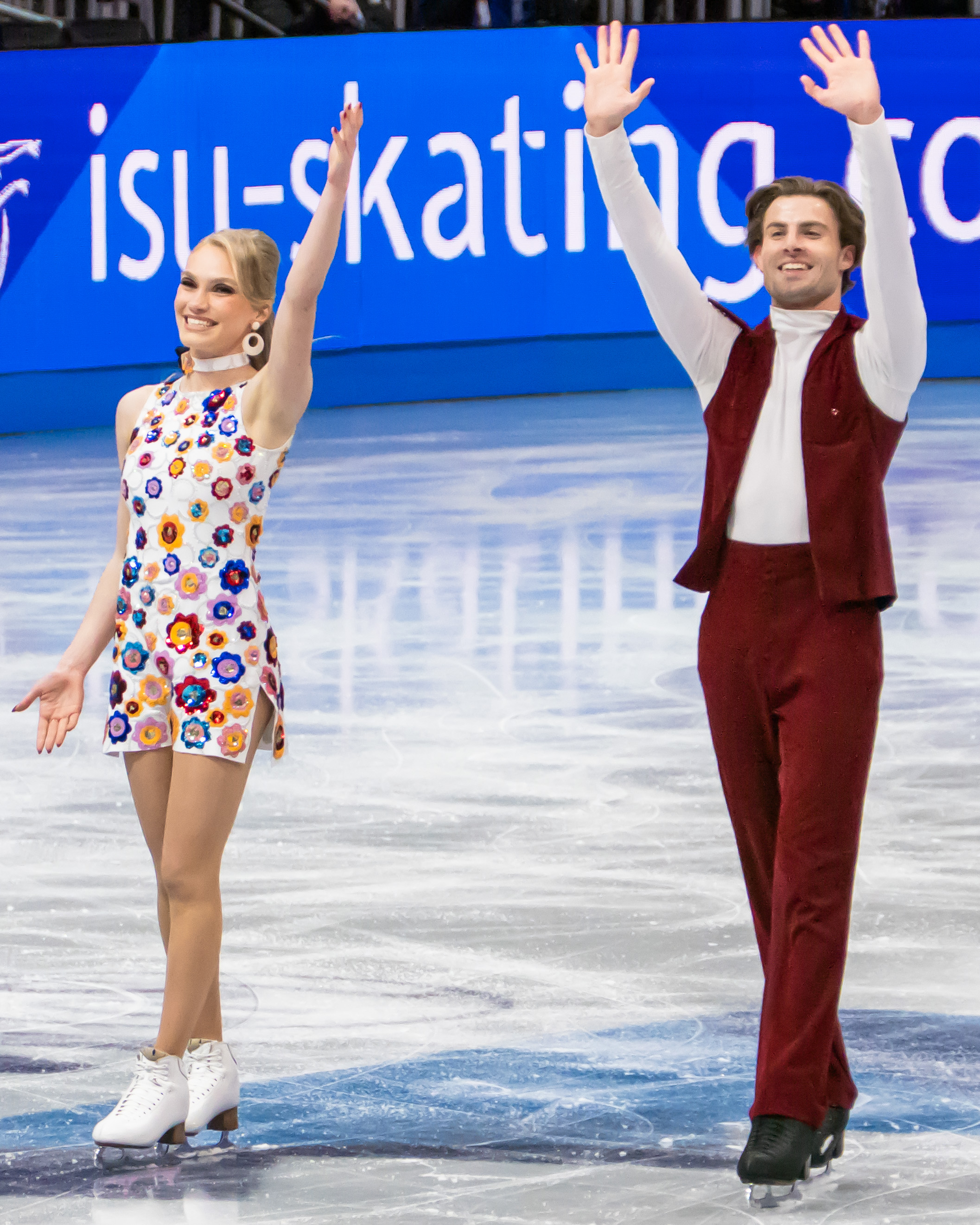
- Phebe Bekker and James Hernandez following their rhythm dance at the 2025 World Championships

Personal information
- Born: 15 October 2001 (age 25) London, England, United Kingdom
- Home town: Amersham, England
- Height: 1.82 m (6 ft 0 in)

Figure skating career
- Country: Great Britain
- Discipline: Ice dance
- Partner: Phebe Bekker (since 2021); Emily Rose Brown (2016–20)
- Coach: Nicholas Buckland; Penny Coomes; Zhanna Palagina
- Skating club: Guildford Figure Skating Club
- Began skating: 2006

Medal record
British Championships
| Silver medal – second place | 2024 Sheffield | Ice dance |
| Silver medal – second place | 2025 Sheffield | Ice dance |
| Silver medal – second place | 2026 Sheffield | Ice dance |

James Hernandez (born 15 October 2001) is a British ice dancer who represents Great Britain. With his current skating partner, Phebe Bekker, he is the 2024 CS Golden Spin of Zagreb champion and a three-time British national silver medalist (2024–2026). Bekker/Hernandez represented Great Britain at the 2026 Winter Olympics.

At the junior level with Bekker, he is a two-time ISU Junior Grand Prix silver medalist, two-time British junior national champion (2021–2022), and placed 4th at the 2023 World Junior Championships. Bekker/Hernandez are the first British ice dance team to win a medal on the ISU Junior Grand Prix circuit.

With his previous partner Emily Rose Brown, Hernandez was the 2020 British junior national champion.

== Personal life ==
Hernandez was born on 15 October 2001 in London, England. He began learning to skate at age 4, and credited his sister with his initial interest in the sport.

He previously dated the 2014 Olympic team event bronze medalist, and two-time U.S national champion, Gracie Gold.

== Career ==
=== Early years with Brown ===
Hernandez formed an ice dance partnership with Emily Rose Brown in advance of the 2015–16 season, and together they won gold at the 2016 British Novice Championships after training together for six months at Slough Ice Rink with coach Phillip Poole. This earned them their first international assignment, to the Bavarian Open's advanced novice competition, where they placed fourth.

In their first two international junior seasons, Brown/Hernandez won consecutive silver medals at the British junior championships, and three appearances on the ISU Junior Grand Prix, in addition to a number of small international competitions.

=== 2019–20 season: Junior national gold ===
In advance of the season, Brown and Hernandez began training in Philadelphia with retired British dance champions Nicholas Buckland and Penny Coomes. After placing tenth and eleventh at their two Junior Grand Prix assignments, they won gold at the British junior championships for the first time. They called this "an incredible feeling for both of us." After participating in a number of other minor junior internationals, they were assigned to compete at the 2020 World Junior Championships. Qualifying to the free dance, they finished in thirteenth position.

Following the onset of the COVID-19 pandemic, Brown opted to retire from competitive skating.

=== 2021–22 season: Debut of Bekker/Hernandez ===
In January 2021, Hernandez announced a new partnership with Phebe Bekker. The two trained with his previous coaches Coomes and Buckland in Philadelphia.

Bekker/Hernandez made their international debut as a team on ISU Junior Grand Prix at the 2022 JGP Slovenia in late September. They were tenth in both segments of competition to place tenth overall. At their second assignment, the 2022 JGP Poland, Bekker/Hernandez placed eighth in the rhythm dance and seventh in the free dance to finish finally in eighth place.

In November, Bekker/Hernandez won their first junior national title at the 2021 British Championships, leading silver medalists Bushell/Lapsky by nearly 30 points. Bekker said of the win, "After such a relatively short time together, we are delighted to win our first British title." Due to their placement at nationals, Bekker/Hernandez were named to the British team for the 2022 World Junior Championships in Tallinn. Before Junior Worlds, Bekker/Hernandez were assigned to the Egna Dance Trophy where they finished seventh. Competing in Tallinn, Bekker/Hernandez were tenth in the rhythm dance and eleventh in the free dance to place tenth overall.

=== 2022–23 season: Junior Grand Prix silvers ===
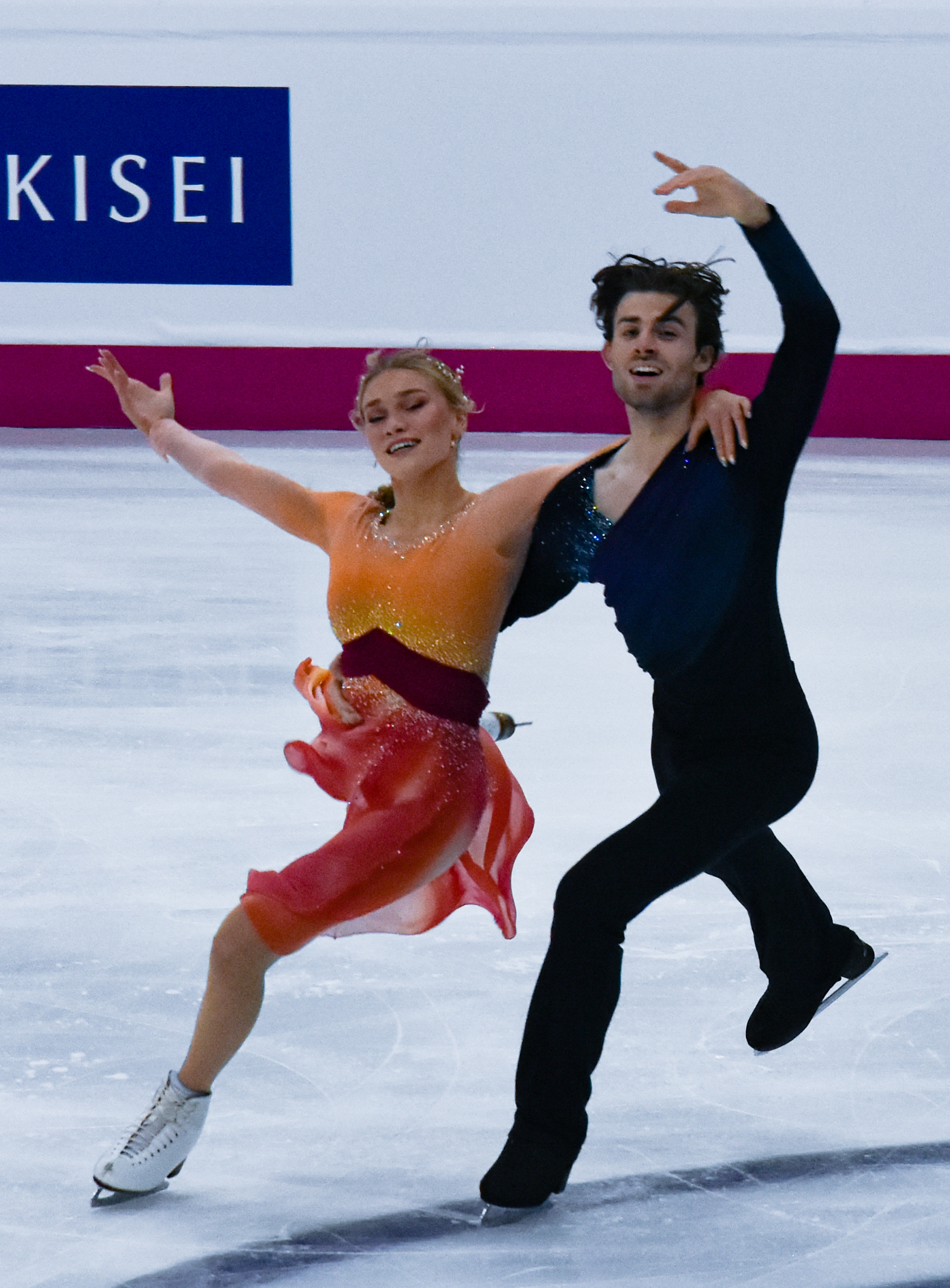
Bekker and Hernandez at the 2022 Junior Grand Prix Final

Beginning the new season at British Ice Skating's new Britannia Cup event, Bekker/Hernandez won gold. On the Junior Grand Prix, Bekker/Hernandez won the silver medal at the 2022 JGP Czech Republic. They won a second silver medal at the 2022 JGP Poland I, in the process becoming the first British dance team to qualify for a Junior Grand Prix Final. Following the end of the Junior Grand Prix, they won their second British junior national title.

Competing at the Final in Turin, they finished second in the rhythm dance, aided by a double-fall by pre-event favourites Mrázková/Mrázek. Hernandez commented on attending the event, saying it was "a really surreal moment, walking down the steps. We've never walked into an area with ambient lighting before. It felt very special." They were overtaken in the free dance by both Lim/Quan of South Korea and Mrázková/Mrázek, finishing fourth overall.

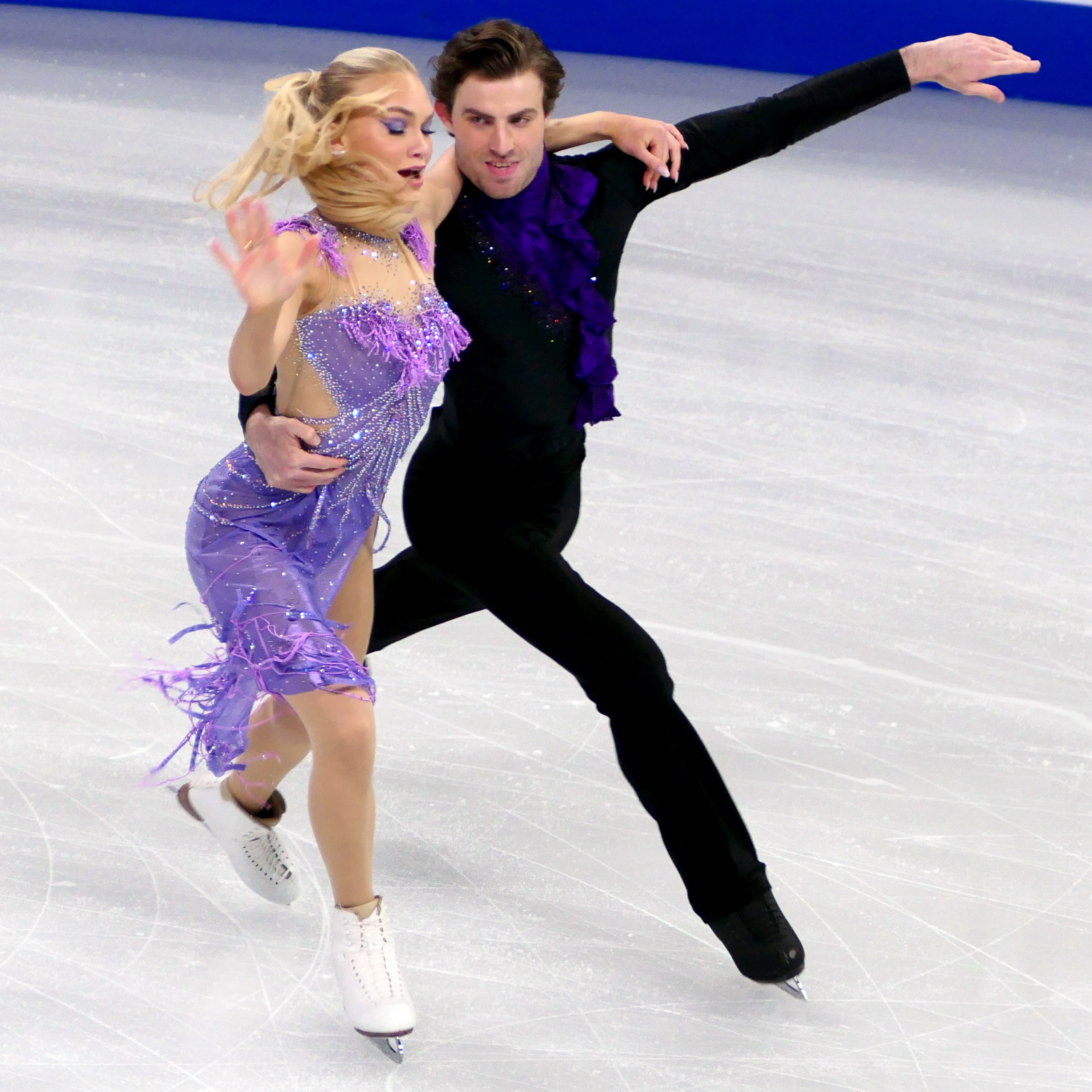
Bekker/Hernandez at the 2024 World Championships

In the new year, Bekker/Hernandez won the bronze medal at the Bavarian Open, finishing behind Grimm/Savitskiy of Germany and Americans Neset/Markelov. They entered the 2023 World Junior Championships in Calgary as possible podium contenders, and set a new personal best score of 68.89 in the rhythm dance, finishing 0.89 points ahead of Canadian team Bashynska/Beaumont, who had been expected to contend for the title but erred on their pattern segment. Bekker/Hernandez earned a bronze small medal for the segment. In the free dance they set another new personal best, but they finished fourth in the segment and, by 0.06 points, fourth overall behind the Canadians due to a one-point deduction for an extended lift. Bekker said that they had "mixed feelings and emotions" about the outcome.

=== 2023–24 season: Senior international debut ===
Hernandez underwent an elbow procedure in the off-season, hindering the team's work on their lifts in the leadup to their senior debut. Both said, looking at the season ahead, that they wanted to avoid a "soft launch" at that level. Making their first appearance on the Challenger circuit at the 2023 CS Nepela Memorial, Bekker/Hernandez finished eighth.

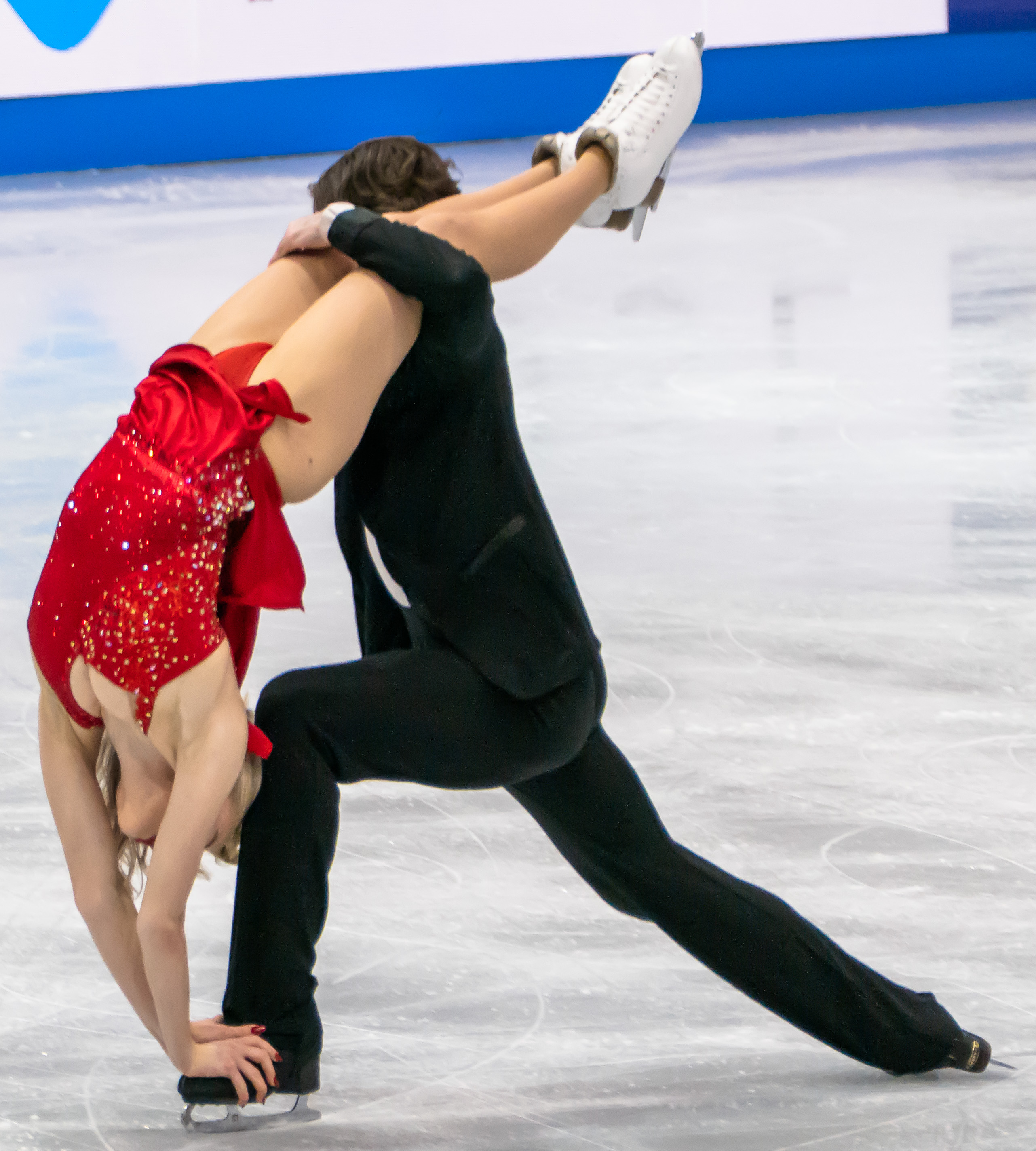
Bekker/Hernandez performing a lift during their free dance at the 2025 World Championships

Bekker/Hernandez made their senior British championship debut, winning the silver medal. They were assigned to join national champions Fear/Gibson at the 2024 European Championships. The following weekend they competed at the 2023 CS Golden Spin of Zagreb, finishing fourth overall and in the process earning the necessary technical minimum scores to take the second British dance berth at the World Championships.

At the European Championships in Kaunas, Lithuania, Bekker/Hernandez finished seventeenth. They called the well-attended event "an eye-opening experience." At season's end, they made their World Championship debut at the 2024 edition in Montreal, Quebec, Canada. They finished twenty-first in the rhythm dance, 0.53 points behind twentieth-place Komatsubara/Koleto of Japan, and thus narrowly missed qualification to the free dance. Despite this, Bekker and Hernandez said that the event was "such a valuable opportunity and we enjoyed every second of it!"

=== 2024–25 season ===
Bekker/Hernandez began the season by competing on the 2024–25 ISU Challenger Series, finishing seventh at the 2024 CS Denis Ten Memorial Challenge and sixth at the 2024 CS Trophée Métropole Nice Côte d'Azur. They followed up these results by winning gold at the 2024 Pavel Roman Memorial.

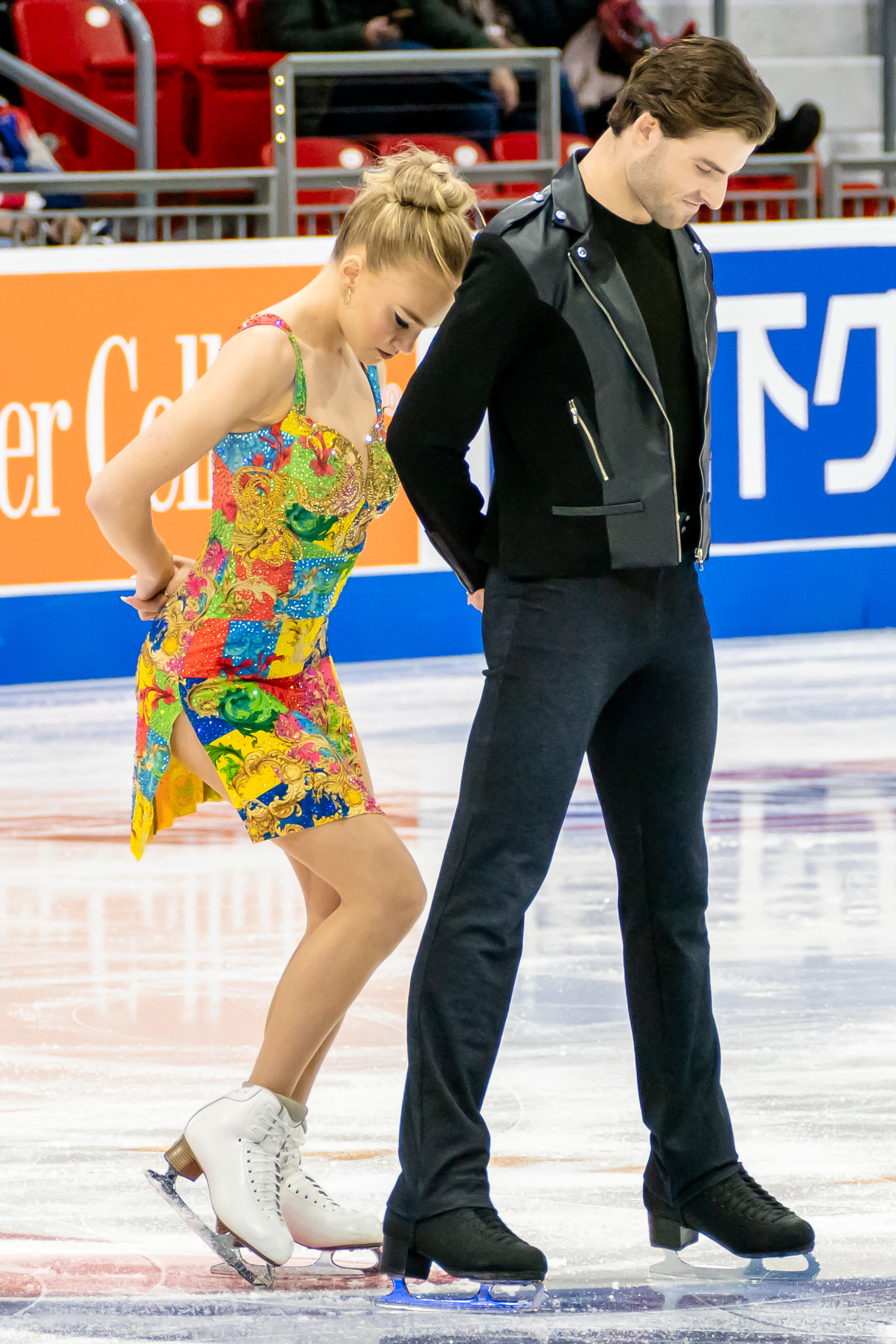
Bekker/Hernandez during the rhythm dance at the 2025 Skate America

In late November, they competed at the 2025 British Championships, winning the silver medal behind Fear/Gibson. Going on to compete at the 2024 CS Golden Spin of Zagreb, Bekker/Hernandez scored personal bests in all competition segments, winning the gold medal.

Assigned to compete at the 2025 European Championships in Tallinn, Estonia, Bekker/Hernandez finished the event in thirteenth place. They subsequently closed the season by finishing seventeenth at the 2025 World Championships in Boston, Massachusetts. Bekker expressed elation at the result in an interview following the event, saying, "This is actually the biggest moment of our career so far. It feels like everything, all the hard work we put in, came together in this moment. We feel incredible, and I’m almost speechless." Their placement, in addition to Fear/Gibson's third-place finish, won Great Britain two quotas for ice dance at the 2026 Winter Olympics.

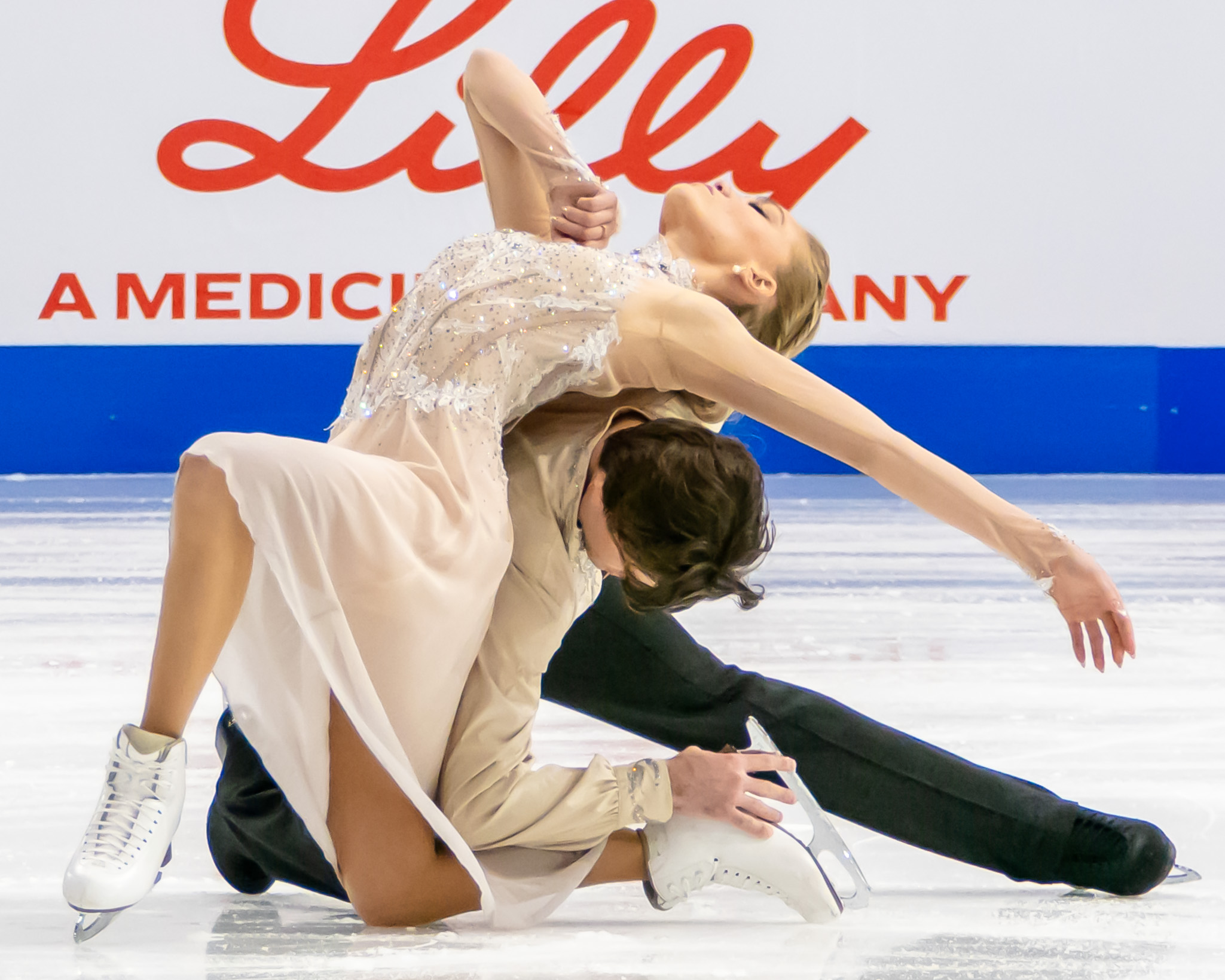
Bekker/Hernandez in their free dance starting position at 2025 Skate America

=== 2025–26 season: Milano Cortina Olympics ===
Bekker/Hernandez opened the season by winning silver at the 2025 Trophée Métropole Nice Côte d'Azur and finishing fourth at the 2025 CS Trialeti Trophy. Going on to make their 2025–26 Grand Prix series debut, Bekker/Hernandez finished eighth at 2025 Skate America and tenth at the 2025 Finlandia Trophy.

In December, the team won the silver medal at the 2026 British Championships for a second consecutive time. Following the event, Bekker/Hernandez were named in the Great Britain team for the 2026 Winter Olympics. One month later, Bekker/Hernandez competed at the 2026 European Championships in Sheffield, England, finishing in eleventh place overall. In February, at the Olympics in Milan, Italy, Bekker/Hernandez finished 17th.

=== 2026–27 season ===
Bekker/Hernandez announced via Bekker's Instagram that they would be taking a hiatus from competition following the intensity of the Olympic season. The pair shared that Hernandez was prioritising a shoulder injury that had an effect on their off-season training.

== Programs ==
=== Ice dance with Phebe Bekker ===
| Season | Rhythm dance | Free dance | Exhibition |
|---|---|---|---|
| 2025–2026 | Freedom! '90; Killer / Papa Was a Rollin' Stone by George Michael; Freedom (Club Mix) by George Michael & Revival House Project choreo. by Penny Coomes, Nicholas Buckland, Chellie Fig | Romeo + Juliet; Mercutio's Death; O Verona; Kissing You (Instrumental) by Craig Armstrong, Marius de Vries, & Nellee Hooper; Kissing You by Des'ree; O Verona (Reprise) by Craig Armstrong, Marius de Vries, & Nellee Hooper choreo. by Penny Coomes, Nicholas Buckland, Chellie Fig | James Bond; The Name's Bond... James Bond (from Casino Royale) by David Arnold & Nicholas Dodd; No Time to Die by Billie Eilish & Finneas O'Connell; Final Ascent (from No Time to Die) by Hans Zimmer choreo. by Penny Coomes, Nicholas Buckland, Chellie Fig |
| 2024–2025 | Get Back; Twist and Shout; Sgt. Pepper's Lonely Hearts Club Band by The Beatles choreo. by Penny Coomes, Nicholas Buckland, Chellie Fig | James Bond; The Name's Bond... James Bond (from Casino Royale) by David Arnold & Nicholas Dodd; No Time to Die by Billie Eilish & Finneas O'Connell; Final Ascent (from No Time to Die) by Hans Zimmer choreo. by Penny Coomes, Nicholas Buckland, Chellie Fig | |
| 2023–2024 | 1999; Purple Rain; Let's Go Crazy by Prince choreo. by Penny Coomes, Nicholas Buckland, Chellie Fig | Ruled by Secrecy; I Belong to You (+Mon cœur s'ouvre à ta voix) by Muse choreo. by Penny Coomes, Nicholas Buckland, Chellie Fig | |
| 2022–2023 | Flamenco: The Duel; Tango de Besame; Flamenco: Concerto de España by Roni Benise choreo. by Penny Coomes, Nicholas Buckland, Chellie Fig | The Four Seasons by Antonio Vivaldi recomposed by Max Richter performed by Daniel Hope and Konzerthausorchester Berlin choreo. by Penny Coomes, Nicholas Buckland, Chellie Fig | Pray by Sam Smith choreo. by Penny Coomes, Nicholas Buckland, Chellie Fig |
| 2021–2022 | Blues: Heartbreak Hotel; Jive: Jailhouse Rock; Street: A Little Less Conversation by Elvis Presley remixed by Junkie XL choreo. by Penny Coomes, Nicholas Buckland, Chellie Fig | In the Mood (Reimagined) by Glenn Miller and OH1; I Will Talk and Hollywood Will Listen by Guy Chambers performed by Robbie Williams choreo. by Penny Coomes, Nicholas Buckland, Chellie Fig | |

=== With Brown ===
| Season | Rhythm dance | Free dance |
|---|---|---|
| 2019–2020 | Top Hat Overture; Let's Face the Music and Dance; Puttin' On the Ritz by Irving Berlin | At the End of the Day; Empty Chairs at Empty Tables; One Day More (from Les Misérables) by Claude-Michel Schönberg |

== Competitive highlights ==
- GP – Event of the ISU Grand Prix Series
- JGP – Event of the ISU Junior Grand Prix Series
- CS – Event of the ISU Challenger Series
- TBD – Assigned
- WD – Withdrew from competition

=== Ice dance with Phebe Bekker ===
Competition placements at senior level
| Season | 2023–24 | 2024–25 | 2025–26 | 2026-27 |
|---|---|---|---|---|
| Winter Olympics | | | 17th | |
| World Championships | 21st | 17th | 16th | |
| European Championships | 17th | 13th | 11th | |
| British Championships | 2nd | 2nd | 2nd | |
| GP Finland | | | 10th | |
| GP Skate America | | | 8th | |
| CS Denis Ten Memorial | | 7th | | |
| CS Golden Spin of Zagreb | | 1st | | |
| CS Nepela Memorial | 8th | | | |
| CS Trialeti Trophy | | | 4th | |
| CS Trophée Métropole Nice | | 6th | | |
| Pavel Roman Memorial | | 1st | | |
| Swiss Open | 2nd | | | |
| Trophée Métropole Nice | | | 2nd | |

Competition placements at junior level
| Season | 2021–22 | 2022–23 |
|---|---|---|
| World Junior Championships | 10th | 4th |
| Junior Grand Prix Final | | 4th |
| British Championships | 1st | 1st |
| JGP Czech Republic | | 2nd |
| JGP Poland | 8th | 2nd |
| JGP Slovenia | 10th | |
| Bavarian Open | | 3rd |
| Britannia Cup | | 1st |
| Egna Dance Trophy | 7th | |

== Detailed results ==
=== Ice dance with Phebe Bekker ===
ISU personal best scores in the +5/-5 GOE System
| Segment | Type | Score | Event |
|---|---|---|---|
| Total | TSS | 181.80 | 2024 CS Golden Spin of Zagreb |
| Rhythm dance | TSS | 72.46 | 2026 Winter Olympics |
| Rhythm dance | TES | 41.63 | 2026 Winter Olympics |
| Rhythm dance | PCS | 31.19 | 2025 CS Trialeti Trophy |
| Free dance | TSS | 109.72 | 2024 CS Golden Spin of Zagreb |
| Free dance | TES | 61.53 | 2025 European Championships |
| Free dance | PCS | 48.40 | 2024 CS Golden Spin of Zagreb |

==== Senior level ====
Results in the 2023–24 season
| Date | Event | RD | | FD | | Total | |
| Date | Event | P | Score | P | Score | P | Score |
|---|---|---|---|---|---|---|---|
| Sep 28–30, 2023 | (Slovakia) 2023 CS Nepela Memorial | 8 | 63.90 | 7 | 98.32 | 8 | 162.22 |
| Oct 26–29, 2023 | (United Kingdom) 2023 Swiss Ice Skating Open | 2 | 69.63 | 2 | 107.43 | 2 | 177.06 |
| Nov 30 – Dec 3, 2023 | (United Kingdom) 2024 British Championships | 2 | 74.80 | 2 | 115.97 | 2 | 190.77 |
| Dec 6–9, 2023 | (Croatia) 2023 CS Golden Spin of Zagreb | 4 | 66.78 | 4 | 102.96 | 4 | 169.74 |
| Jan 8–14, 2024 | (Lithuania) 2024 European Championships | 19 | 61.19 | 17 | 93.56 | 17 | 154.75 |
| Mar 18–24, 2024 | (Canada) 2024 World Championships | 21 | 66.39 | - | - | 21 | 66.39 |

Results in the 2024–25 season
| Date | Event | RD | | FD | | Total | |
| Date | Event | P | Score | P | Score | P | Score |
|---|---|---|---|---|---|---|---|
| Oct 3–5, 2024 | (Kazakhstan) 2024 CS Denis Ten Memorial Challenge | 8 | 64.07 | 7 | 102.88 | 7 | 166.95 |
| Oct 16–20, 2024 | (France) 2024 CS Trophée Métropole Nice Côte d'Azur | 6 | 67.77 | 6 | 101.85 | 6 | 169.62 |
| Nov 9–10, 2024 | (Czech Republic) 2024 Pavel Roman Memorial | 1 | 69.94 | 1 | 110.37 | 1 | 180.31 |
| Nov 27 – Dec 1, 2024 | (United Kingdom) 2025 British Championships | 2 | 70.76 | 2 | 104.53 | 2 | 175.29 |
| Dec 4–7, 2024 | (Croatia) 2024 CS Golden Spin of Zagreb | 1 | 72.36 | 1 | 109.72 | 1 | 181.80 |
| Jan 28 – Feb 2, 2025 | (Estonia) 2025 European Championships | 13 | 68.13 | 13 | 107.89 | 13 | 176.02 |
| Mar 25–30, 2025 | (United States) 2025 World Championships | 17 | 70.98 | 16 | 107.37 | 17 | 178.35 |

Results in the 2025–26 season
| Date | Event | RD | | FD | | Total | |
| Date | Event | P | Score | P | Score | P | Score |
|---|---|---|---|---|---|---|---|
| Oct 1–5, 2025 | (France) 2025 Trophée Métropole Nice Côte d'Azur | 2 | 70.76 | 2 | 104.53 | 2 | 175.29 |
| Oct 8–11,2025 | (Georgia (country)) 2025 CS Trialeti Trophy | 3 | 70.27 | 5 | 104.10 | 4 | 174.37 |
| Nov 14–16, 2025 | (United States) 2025 Skate America | 8 | 66.81 | 7 | 106.35 | 8 | 173.16 |
| Nov 21–23, 2025 | (Finland) 2025 Finlandia Trophy | 10 | 62.87 | 9 | 102.73 | 10 | 165.60 |
| Nov 26–30, 2025 | (United Kingdom) 2026 British Championships | 2 | 77.87 | 2 | 117.69 | 2 | 195.56 |
| Jan 13–18, 2026 | (United Kingdom) 2026 European Championships | 11 | 71.64 | 13 | 106.75 | 11 | 178.39 |
| Feb 6–19, 2026 | (Italy) 2026 Winter Olympics | 16 | 72.46 | 18 | 106.99 | 17 | 179.45 |
| Mar 24–29, 2026 | (Czech Republic) 2026 World Championships | 18 | 70.82 | 16 | 107.47 | 16 | 178.29 |

==== Junior level ====
2022–23 season
| Date | Event | RD | FD | Total |
| Feb. 27 – Mar. 5, 2023 | 2023 World Junior Championships | 3; 68.89 | 4; 100.18 | 4; 169.07 |
| Jan. 31 – Feb. 5, 2023 | 2023 Bavarian Open | 2; 66.32 | 3; 93.98 | 3; 160.30 |
| December 8–11, 2022 | 2022–23 Junior Grand Prix Final | 2; 64.58 | 4; 92.39 | 4; 156.97 |
| December 1–4, 2022 | 2022 British Junior Championships | 1; 65.40 | 1; 96.15 | 1; 161.55 |
| Sept. 28 – Oct. 1, 2022 | 2022 JGP Poland I | 3; 64.17 | 2; 94.68 | 2; 158.85 |
| Aug. 31 – Sept. 3, 2022 | 2022 JGP Czech Republic | 2; 65.19 | 2; 94.36 | 2; 159.55 |
| August 26–28, 2022 | 2022 Britannia Cup | 1; 55.09 | 1; 86.37 | 1; 141.46 |
2021–22 season
| Date | Event | RD | FD | Total |
| April 13–17, 2022 | 2022 World Junior Championships | 10; 56.63 | 11; 81.53 | 10; 138.16 |
| February 4–6, 2022 | 2022 Egna Trophy | 4; 61.56 | 8; 82.78 | 7; 144.34 |
| January 20–26, 2020 | 2021 British Championships | 1; 60.51 | 1; 87.52 | 1; 148.03 |
| Sept. 29 – Oct. 2, 2021 | 2021 JGP Poland | 8; 50.84 | 7; 80.57 | 8; 131.41 |
| August 28–31, 2019 | 2021 JGP Slovenia | 10; 50.24 | 10; 78.23 | 10; 128.47 |

=== With Brown ===
2019–20 season
| Date | Event | RD | FD | Total |
| March 2–8, 2020 | 2020 World Junior Championships | 12; 57.10 | 13; 84.65 | 13; 141.75 |
| January 7–12, 2020 | 2020 Mentor Toruń Cup | 3; 61.56 | 5; 93.26 | 4; 154.61 |
| December 4–7, 2019 | 2020 Golden Spin of Zagreb | 4; 61.50 | 3; 90.08 | 4; 151.58 |
| Nov. 28 – Dec. 1, 2019 | 2020 British Championships | 1; 60.78 | 1; 93.16 | 1; 153.90 |
| October 17–20, 2019 | 2019 Halloween Cup | 5; 51.44 | 6; 79.36 | 5; 130.80 |
| September 26–28, 2019 | 2019 JGP Croatia | 12; 51.52 | 11; 77.04 | 11; 128.56 |
| September 11–14, 2019 | 2019 JGP Chelyabinsk | 9; 52.12 | 11; 72.57 | 10; 124.69 |
2018–19 season
| Date | Event | RD | FD | Total |
| October 3–6, 2018 | 2018 JGP Ljubljana | 9; 50.88 | 11; 68.90 | 10; 119.78 |
| August 22–25, 2018 | 2018 JGP Bratislava | 7; 51.13 | 10; 75.17 | 7; 126.30 |
| August 10–12, 2018 | 2018 NRW Trophy | 2; 53.58 | 4; 70.63 | 4; 124.21 |
| July 30 – Aug. 3, 2018 | 2018 IJS Sheffield | 2; 38.17 | 2; 76.13 | 2; 114.30 |
2017–18 season
| Date | Event | RD | FD | Total |
| January 26–31, 2018 | 2018 Bavarian Open | 4; 46.60 | 11; 58.13 | 8; 104.73 |
| Nov. 28 – Dec. 4, 2017 | 2018 British Championships | 2; 45.05 | 2; 69.14 | 2; 114.19 |
| September 27–30, 2017 | 2017 JGP Croatia | 10; 45.58 | 7; 65.10 | 7; 110.68 |
| Aug. 30 – Sept. 2, 2017 | 2017 JGP Austria | 15; 34.90 | 9; 58.67 | 11; 93.57 |
2016–17 season
| Date | Event | RD | FD | Total |
| January 26–31, 2018 | 2017 Bavarian Open | 7; 46.28 | 7; 76.94 | 6; 122.90 |
| Nov. 29 – Dec. 4, 2016 | 2017 British Championships | 2; 37.44 | 2; 72.46 | 2; 109.90 |
| November 4–6, 2016 | 2016 NRW Trophy | 10; 42.80 | 16; 55.70 | 14; 98.50 |
| Sept. 28 – Oct. 1, 2016 | 2016 JGP Estonia | 15; 39.24 | 14; 56.81 | 15; 96.05 |
