= Torvill & Dean (film) =

2018 British television film

- Genre: Biopic
- Written by: William Ivory
- Directed by: Gillies MacKinnon
- Composer: Andrew Simon McAllister
- Country of origin: United Kingdom
- Original language: English

Production
- Executive producers: Victoria Fea; Emily Dalton; William Ivory
- Producer: Emma Burge
- Production location: Northern Ireland
- Cinematography: Damien Elliott
- Editor: Anne Sopel
- Running time: 95 minutes

Original release
- Network: ITV
- Release: 25 December 2018

Torvill & Dean is a British television biopic written by William Ivory, directed by Gillies MacKinnon, and broadcast on ITV on Christmas Day 2018. It is about the early life and careers of Jayne Torvill and Christopher Dean, the Nottinghamshire ice dancers who went on to record a perfect score and win the Olympic gold medal in Sarajevo at the 1984 Winter Olympics.

== Cast ==
- Will Tudor as Christopher Dean
- Poppy Lee Friar as Jayne Torvill
- Cassie Bradley as Leanne
- Dean Andrews as Colin Dean
- Annabelle Apsion as Betty Callaway
- Mark Benton as Ted
- Christine Bottomley as Mavis Dean
- Anita Dobson as Miss Perry
- Susan Earl as Betty Dawson
- Jo Hartley as Betty Torvill
- Stephen Tompkinson as George Torvill
- Jaime Winstone as Janet Sawbridge
- Curtis Lee Ashquar as Darren
- Tim Bentinck as Announcer
- Joe Docherty as Brian Dawson
- Kevwe Emefe as Receptionist
- Danielle Hadfield-Easton as Young Jayne
- Mason Hart as Young Christopher
- Daniel Fitzsimons as Aidy
- Niall Lingard as Andrew

== Production ==
British Olympic ice skaters Nick Buckland and Penny Coomes joined the cast as stunt doubles, and acted as consultants. Torvill and Dean were interviewed extensively by Nottinghamshire-born writer William Ivory and gave their blessing to the biopic. Cassie Bradley performed her own ice skating for the role of Leanne, having grown up in Nottingham and attended school with friends Buckland and Coomes.

== Reception ==
The film was watched by 7.74 million viewers in the UK.

Lucy Mangan in The Guardian gave the biopic 5 stars praising the "perfect adaptation" and "genuinely brilliant" performances by Will Tudor and Poppy Lee Friar. The Daily Telegraph also praised the "perfect nostalgic festive fare" with "broad humour and gentle observation". The Independent was more critical giving 2 stars and commenting on the "schmalz".

== Home media ==
Torvill & Dean was released on DVD and bluray in the UK on March 25, 2019. An Australian DVD was released on November 06, 2019.
