= Cassie Bradley =

British actress

- Education: Oxford School of Drama
- Occupation: Actress

Cassie Bradley is a British actress known for her work with Sam Mendes and Marianne Elliott at the National Theatre and her screen appearances on BBC, ITV and Channel 5 including Coronation Street, Torvill and Dean and McDonald & Dodds. She trained at the Oxford School of Drama.

During 2025, she appeared in a revival of Nick Payne's two-hander, One Day When We Were Young at London's Park Theatre. Directed by James Haddrell, Bradley and her co-star Barney White were praised for "beautiful performances that anchor romance across time".
