= Pavel Roman Memorial =

Annual ice dance competition

- Status: Active
- Genre: Ice dance competition
- Frequency: Annual
- Venue: Zimní stadion Olomouc
- Location: Olomouc
- Country: Czechoslovakia (1992); Czech Republic (since 1993)
- Inaugurated: 1992
- Organizer: Czech Figure Skating Association; Olomouc Figure Skating Club

The Pavel Roman Memorial (Czech: Memoriál Pavla Romana) is an annual ice dance competition sanctioned by the International Skating Union (ISU), organized and hosted by the Czech Figure Skating Association (Czech: Český krasobruslařský svaz) and the Olomouc Figure Skating Club at the Zimní stadion Olomouc in Olomouc, Czech Republic. The competition debuted in 1992 and is named in honor of Pavel Roman, who competed internationally in pair skating and ice dance for Czechoslovakia. Medals may be awarded at the senior and junior levels, although competition at every level may not be held every year due to a lack of entrants.

== History ==
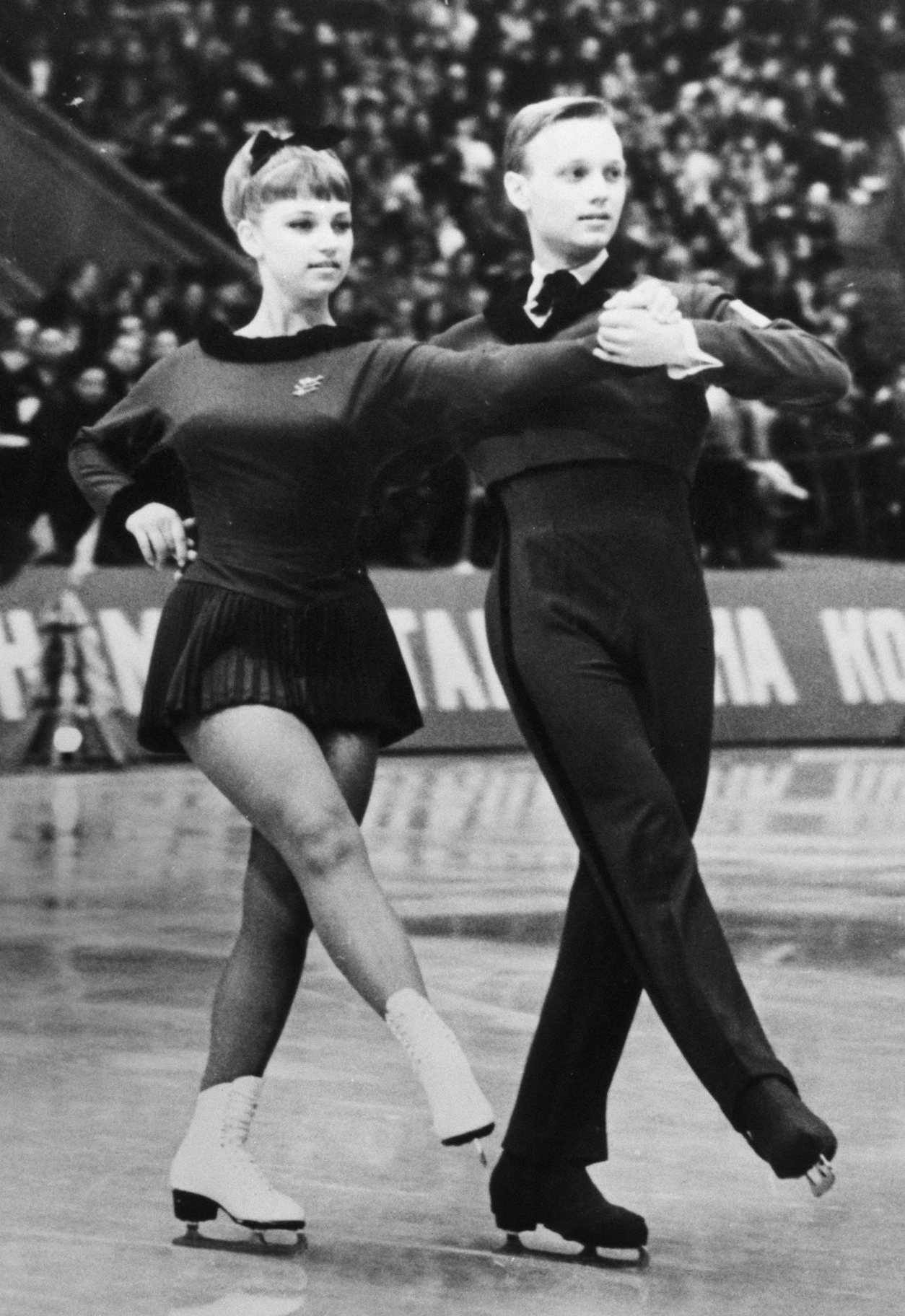
Eva Romanová and Pavel Roman at the 1965 World Championships

The Pavel Roman Memorial is named in honor of Pavel Roman, who competed internationally in pair skating and ice dance for Czechoslovakia. With his sister Eva Romanová, they were four-time world champions (1962–1965), two-time European champions (1964–1965), and seven-time Czechoslovak national championships (1959–1965), all in ice dance. After retiring from competitive skating, Romanová and Roman toured with Holiday on Ice. Roman died in a motorcycle crash in 1972.

The Pavel Roman Memorial was first held in 1992 in Olomouc, in what was then Czechoslovakia. It was a continuation of the November 17th Cup (Czech: Poháru 17. listopadu), an earlier figure skating competition which dated back to 1968. It had been thirty years since Romanová and Roman won their first World Championship title, and twenty years since Roman's death. Barbara Fusar-Poli and Alberto Reani of Italy won the competition.

The dissolution of Czechoslovakia occurred on 31 December 1992, leading to the creation of two independent nations: the Czech Republic and Slovakia. The 1993 Pavel Roman Memorial was the first to be held in the newly independent Czech Republic; Bérangère Nau and Luc Monéger of France were the winners.

No competition was held from 1997 to 1999 after the Zimní stadion Olomouc was damaged during the 1997 Central European flood. The competition was also cancelled in 2017 and 2020, the latter of which was due to the COVID-19 pandemic.

== Senior medalists ==
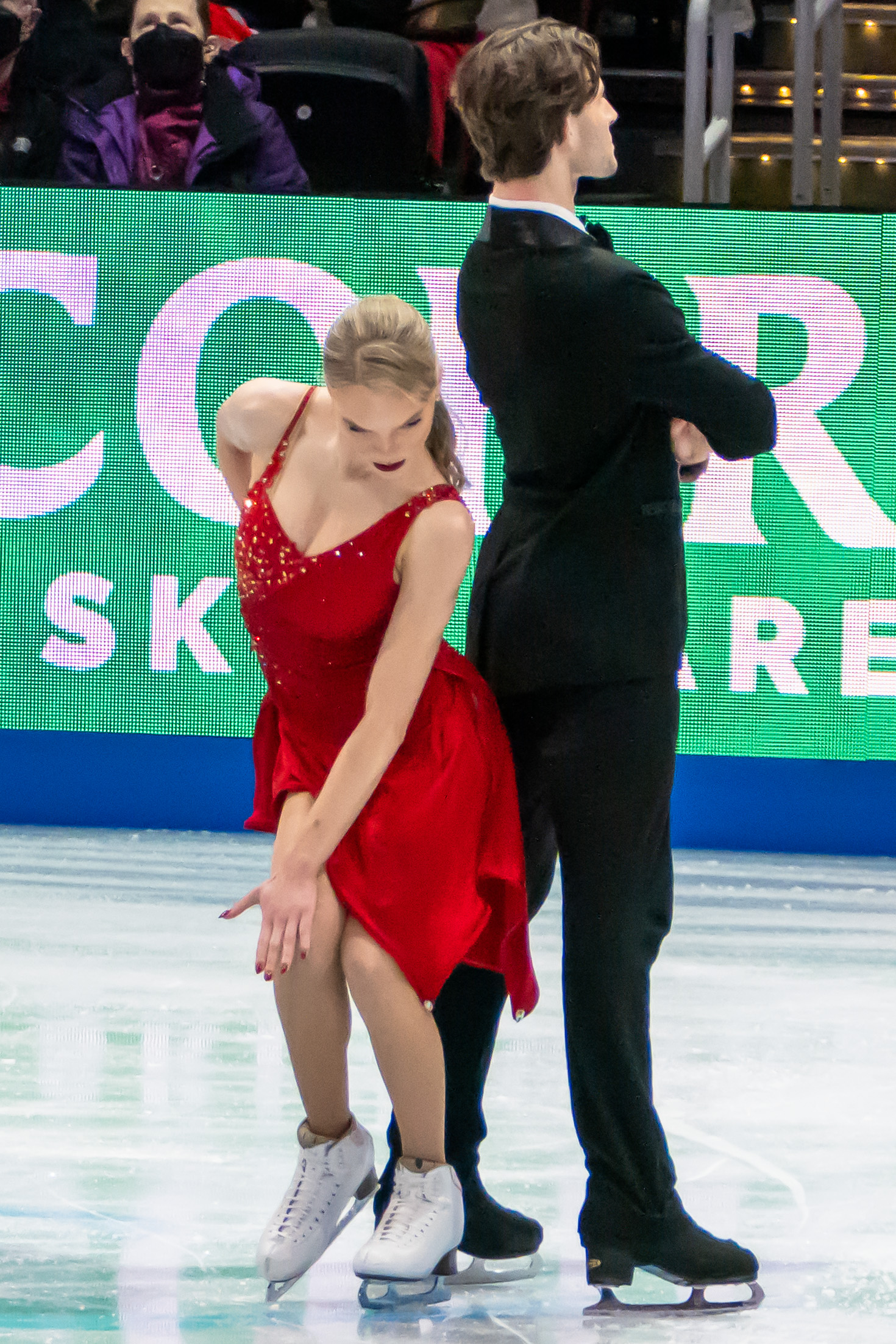
Phebe Bekker and James Hernandez of Great Britain, the 2024 Pavel Roman Memorial gold medalists

Senior event medalists
Year	Gold	Silver	Bronze	Ref.
1992	(Italy); Barbara Fusar-Poli; Alberto Reani	(Czechoslovakia); Viera Poráčová; Pavol Poráč	(Ukraine); Svitlana Chernikova; Oleksandr Sosnenko	
1993	(France); Bérangère Nau; Luc Monéger	(Czech Republic); Lucie Jeřábková; Martin Andrašovský	(Australia); Christine Seydel; Duncan Smart	
1994	(France); Bérangère Nau; Luc Monéger	(France); Agnès Jacquemard; Alexis Gayet	(Germany); Dominique Wenzel; Arno Dienenthal	
1995	(France); Stéphanie Guardia; Franck Laporte	(Czech Republic); Radmila Chroboková; David Blažek	(Germany); Melissa Möhler; Michael Osthoff	
1996				
1997–99	No competitions held due to the 1997 Central European flood			
2000				
2001				
2002	(United Kingdom); Pamela O'Connor; Jonathan O'Dougherty	(United Kingdom); Phillipa Towler-Green; Robert Burgerman	(Estonia); Marina Timofeieva; Evgeni Striganov	
2003	No senior-level competitors			
2004	(Czech Republic); Diana Janošťáková; Jiří Procházka	(Slovakia); Ivana Dlhopolčeková; Hynek Bílek	(Uzbekistan); Olga Akimova; Alexander Shakalov	
2005	(Czech Republic); Kamila Hájková; David Vincour	(France); Eve Bentley; Cédric Pernet	No other competitors	
2006	(Belarus); Evgenia Melnik; Oleg Krupen	(Poland); Joanna Budner; Jan Mościcki	(Estonia); Aleksandra Gott; Iliya Koreshev	
2007	(Czech Republic); Kamila Hájková; David Vincour	(Germany); Carolina Hermann; Daniel Hermann	(Czech Republic); Lucie Myslivečková; Matěj Novák	
2008	(Germany); Nelli Zhiganshina; Alexander Gazsi	(Czech Republic); Kamila Hájková; David Vincour	(United Kingdom); Christina Chitwood; Mark Hanretty	
2009	(Hungary); Nóra Hoffmann; Maxim Zavozin	(Czech Republic); Lucie Myslivečková; Matěj Novák	(Germany); Nelli Zhiganshina; Alexander Gazsi	
2010	(Germany); Nelli Zhiganshina; Alexander Gazsi	(Slovakia); Nikola Višňová; Lukáš Csölley	(Hungary); Zsuzsanna Nagy; Máté Fejes	
2011	(Hungary); Zsuzsanna Nagy; Máté Fejes	(Czech Republic); Gabriela Kubová; Dmitri Kiselev	(Germany); Carolina Hermann; Daniel Hermann	
2012	(Germany); Nelli Zhiganshina; Alexander Gazsi	(Ukraine); Siobhan Heekin-Canedy; Dmitri Dun	(Italy); Charlene Guignard; Marco Fabbri	
2013	(Denmark); Laurence Fournier Beaudry; Nikolaj Sørensen	(Hungary); Dóra Turóczi; Balázs Major	(United Kingdom); Sophie Jones; Jordan Brown	
2014	(Austria); Barbora Silná; Juri Kurakin	(Czech Republic); Cortney Mansour; Michal Češka	(France); Laureline Aubry; Kévin Bellingard	
2015	(Czech Republic); Cortney Mansour; Michal Češka	(Lithuania); Taylor Tran; Saulius Ambrulevičius	No other competitors	
2016	No senior-level competitors			
2017	Competition cancelled			
2018	(Russia); ~~Anastasia Shakun~~; ~~Daniil Ragimov~~; (Note: Anastasia Shakun and Daniil Ragimov of Russia originally won the 2018 Pavel Roman Memorial, but were later disqualified when Shakun tested positive for a prohibited substance.)	No other competitors		
2019	(Ukraine); Oleksandra Nazarova; Maksym Nikitin	(Poland); Justyna Plutowska; Jérémie Flemin	(Germany); Amanda Peterson; Maximilian Pfisterer	
2020	Competition cancelled due to the COVID-19 pandemic			
2021	(Czech Republic); Natálie Taschlerová; Filip Taschler	(Russia); Ekaterina Mironova; Evgenii Ustenko	(Ukraine); Mariia Holubtsova; Kyryl Bielobrov	
2022	(Czech Republic); Denisa Cimlová; Joti Polizoakis	(Italy); Carolina Portesi Peroni; Michael Chrastecky	(Ukraine); Mariia Pinchuk; Mykyta Pogorielov	
2023	(Ukraine); Mariia Pinchuk; Mykyta Pogorielov	(Hungary); Lucy Hancock; Iliász Fourati	(France); Eva Bernard; Amedeo Bonetto	
2024	(United Kingdom); Phebe Bekker; James Hernandez	(Spain); Sofía Val; Asaf Kazimov	(Switzerland); Gina Zehnder; Beda Leon Sieber	
2025	(France); Marie Dupayage; Thomas Nabais	No other competitors		

== Junior medalists ==
While junior-level competitions were held at the Pavel Roman Memorial prior to 2002, this is earliest for which full results have been documented.

Junior event medalists
Year	Gold	Silver	Bronze	Ref.
2002	(Czech Republic); Petra Pachlová; Petr Knoth	(Austria); Barbara Herzog; Dmitri Matsjuk	(Germany); Sandra Gissmann; Marco Derpa	
2003	(Czech Republic); Barbora Silná; Martin Šubrt	(Poland); Joanna Budner; Jan Mościcki	(Hungary); Kitty Jónas; Ádám Sólya	
2004	(Czech Republic); Kamila Hájková; David Vincour	(Estonia); Grethe Grünberg; Kristjan Rand	(France); Zoé Blanc; Pierre-Loup Bouquet	
2005	(Germany); Carolina Hermann; Daniel Hermann	(Poland); Joanna Budner; Jan Mościcki	(Hungary); Krisztina Barta; Ádám Tóth	
2006	(Germany); Tanja Kolbe; Sascha Rabe	(Czech Republic); Lucie Myslivečková; Matěj Novák	(Germany); Carolina Hermann; Daniel Hermann	
2007	(Russia); Kristina Gorshkova; Vitali Butikov	(Ukraine); Alisa Agafanova; Dmitri Dun	(Hungary); Emese Laszlo; Máté Fejes	
2008	(Italy); Lorenza Alessandrini; Simone Vaturi	(France); Anne Sophie Bilet; Adrien Hamon	(Czech Republic); Gabriela Kubová; Petr Seknička	
2009	(Germany); Stefanie Frohberg; Tim Giesen	(Ukraine); Anastasia Galyeta; Oleksii Shumskyi	(Hungary); Dóra Turóczi; Balázs Major	
2010	(Russia); Alexandra Stepanova; Ivan Bukin	(Czech Republic); Karolína Procházková; Michal Češka	(Russia); Tatiana Baturintseva; Sergey Mozgov	
2011	(Russia); Ksenia Korobkova; Daniil Gleikhengauz	(Belarus); Viktoria Kavaliova; Yurii Bieliaiev	(Germany); Shari Koch; Christian Nüchtern	
2012	(Czech Republic); Karolína Procházková; Michal Češka	(Russia); Anastasia Shpilevaya; Grigory Smirnov	(Czech Republic); Jana Čejková; Alexandr Sinicyn	
2013	(Belarus); Viktoria Kavaliova; Yurii Bieliaiev	(Czech Republic); Cortney Mansour; Michal Češka	(Germany); Loreen Geiler; Sven Miersch	
2014	(Czech Republic); Nicole Kuzmichová; Alexandr Sinicyn	(Czech Republic); Kateřina Koníčková; Matěj Lang	(Germany); Ria Schwendinger; Valentin Wunderlich	
2015	(Czech Republic); Nicole Kuzmichová; Alexandr Sinicyn	(Germany); Ria Schwendinger; Valentin Wunderlich	(Russia); Olga Bibihina; Daniil Zvorykin	
2016	No junior-level competitors			
2017	Competition cancelled			
2018	(France); Loïcia Demougeot; Théo le Mercier	(Germany); Charise Matthaei; Maximilian Pfisterer	(United Kingdom); Sasha Fear; George Waddell	
2019	(United Kingdom); Sasha Fear; George Waddell	(Russia); Sofia Kachushkina; Egor Goncharov	(Germany); Lara Luft; Stephano Schuster	
2020	Competition cancelled due to the COVID-19 pandemic			
2021	(Czech Republic); Kateřina Mrázková; Daniel Mrázek	(Russia); Uliana Ermakova; Artem Krylov	(Slovakia); Anna Simova; Kirill Aksenov	
2022	(Cyprus); Angelina Kudryavtseva; Ilia Karankevich	(Ukraine); Iryna Pidgaina; Artem Koval	(Germany); Karla Maria Karl; Kai Hoferichter	
2023	(Ukraine); Iryna Pidgaina; Artem Koval	(Italy); Noemi Maria Tali; Noah Lafornara	(Switzerland); Gina Zehnder; Beda Leon Sieber	
2024	(France); Célina Fradji; Jean-Hans Fourneaux	(Ukraine); Iryna Pidgaina; Artem Koval	(France); Louise Bordet; Martin Chardain	
2025	(France); Lou Koch; Lucas Chataignoux	(Czech Republic); Diane Sznajder; Jachym Novak	(Czech Republic); Eliska Zakova; Filip Mencl	
