= Dubinsky =

Dubinsky, Dubinskiy, or Dubinski is a gender-neutral Slavic surname originating from the noun dubina (cudgel); Its feminine counterpart is Dubinskaya or Dubinska. Notable people with the surname include:

- Angelika Dubinski (born 1995), German figure skater
- Brandon Dubinsky (born 1986), American ice hockey player
- David Dubinsky (1892–1982), American labor leader
- Donna Dubinsky (born 1955), American businesswoman
- Eduard Dubinski (1935–1969), Ukrainian football player
- Leon Dubinsky (1941–2023), Canadian actor
- Oleksandr Dubinsky (born 1981), Ukrainian journalist, politician, blogger
- Steve Dubinsky (born 1970), Canadian ice hockey player
