= Daniel Hermann =

German figure skater

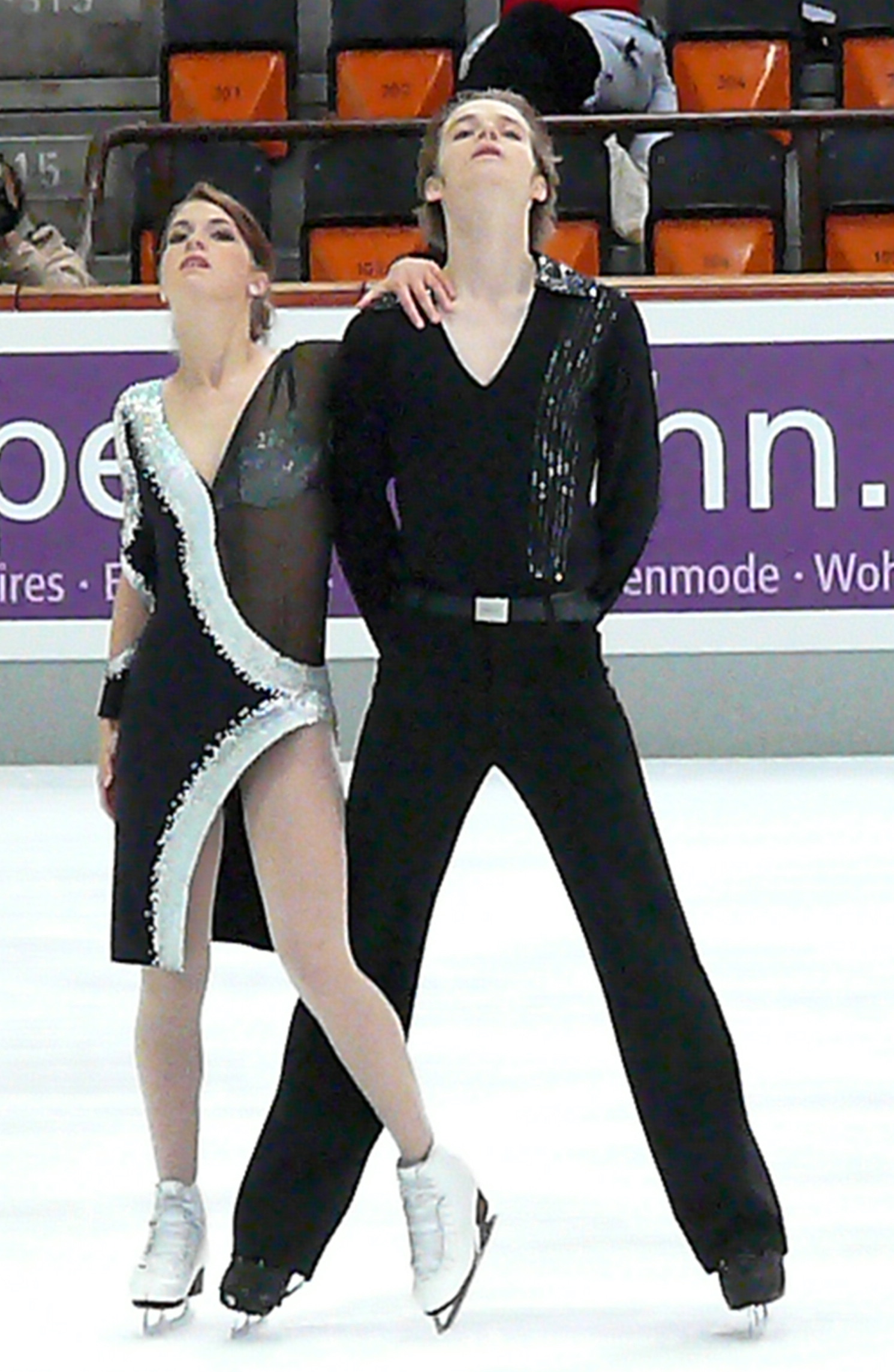
- The Hermanns in 2007.

Personal information
- Full name: Daniel Felix Hermann
- Born: 12 October 1986 (age 39) Wuppertal, West Germany
- Height: 1.83 m (6 ft 0 in)

Figure skating career
- Country: Germany
- Partner: Carolina Hermann
- Skating club: ERC Westfalen Dortmund
- Began skating: 1994
- Retired: 2012

Daniel Felix Hermann (born 12 October 1986) is a German former competitive ice dancer. With his sister, Carolina Hermann, he won six senior international medals and the 2009 German national title. They reached the free dance at three ISU Championships, attaining their best result, tenth, at the 2007 World Junior Championships.

== Personal life ==
Daniel Felix Hermann was born on 12 October 1986 in Wuppertal, West Germany. He has six siblings, including Carolina Hermann.

== Career ==
The Hermanns started skating in the winter of 1991 and joined Solinger Turnerbund sports club in 1994. In 1997, they teamed up together and began learning ice dancing, coached by Oleg Ryjkin at the Olympic training centre in Dortmund. They competed on the novice level until the end of the 2002–03 season.

In the 2003–04 season, the Hermanns moved up to the junior ranks. They were given two ISU Junior Grand Prix assignments and finished ninth at both. They continued to appear on the JGP series during the next three seasons. In 2006–07, they won the German junior national title and were sent to the 2007 World Junior Championships in Oberstdorf, Germany, where they finished tenth.

The Hermanns began competing on the senior level in the 2007–08 season. Making their Grand Prix debut, they placed 8th at the 2007 Skate Canada International. They won a silver medal at the Pavel Roman Memorial and bronze at the German Championships.

Since Daniel had to study one term abroad for his degree, they spent the summer of 2008 training in Vancouver under Victor Kraatz and his wife Maikki Uotila-Kraatz. In the 2008–09 season, the Hermanns won the German national title ahead of Nelli Zhiganshina / Alexander Gazsi. They were selected to represent Germany at two ISU Championships and qualified for the free dance at both, finishing 12th at the 2009 Europeans in Helsinki, Finland and 17th at the 2009 Worlds in Los Angeles, California.

In 2009–10, the Hermanns finished second to another sibling duo, Christina Beier / William Beier, at the German Championships and were eliminated from the World Championships in Turin, Italy after placing 22nd in the short dance.

The Hermanns missed the 2010–11 season due to injury and returned to the ice in March 2011, working with Rene Lohse in Berlin. 2011–12 would be their final season. They won bronze medals at the 2011 Pavel Roman Memorial, 2011 NRW Trophy, and 2012 German Championships and then retired from competition.

== Programs ==
(with Carolina Hermann)

Season	Short dance	Free dance
2011–12	The Boy Does Nothing by Alesha Dixon; Perhaps, Perhaps, Perhaps performed by The Pussycat Dolls; Let's Get Loud by Jennifer Lopez	Marguerite by Michel Legrand
	Original dance	
2009–10	Folklore from the Alps: Das Kufsteiner Lied (Die Perle Tirols); Mei Vatta i a Apenzeller	The Mask; This Business of Love; Hey Pachuco; You Would Be My Baby; Cuban Pete
2008–09	Slow Foxtrot: You're the Cream in my Coffee by Gordon MacRay; Charleston: Happy Feet	The Mask; This Business of Love; Hey Pachuco; You Would Be My Baby; Cuban Pete
2007–08	Greek folk dance: Nasyvargyaszman, Dilyargyazman; Sasasolie	James Bond; Diamonds Are Forever; The Man with the Golden Gun by John Barry; The World Is Not Enough by David Arnold; Live and Let Die by Paul and Linda McCartney
2006–07	Pariser Tango by Mireille Mathieu	James Bond; Diamonds Are Forever; The Man with the Golden Gun by John Barry; The World Is Not Enough by David Arnold; Live and Let Die by Paul and Linda McCartney
2005–06	Cha Cha; Rhumba; Samba	Moulin Rouge!; Lady Marmalade; El Tango de Roxanne
2004–05	Charleston; Slow Foxtrot	Moulin Rouge!; Lady Marmalade; El Tango de Roxanne
2003–04	Grease medley	Music by Safri Duo
2002–03		Music by Safri Duo
2001–02		Addams Family
2000–01		Medley by Eros Ramazzotti
1999–2000		Tango
1998–99		The Phantom of the Opera
1997–98		Pinocchio

== Results ==
(with Hermann)

GP: Grand Prix; JGP: Junior Grand Prix

International
Event	03–04	04–05	05–06	06–07	07–08	08–09	09–10	11–12
Worlds						17th	22nd	
Europeans						12th		
GP Cup of Russia							9th	
GP Skate Canada					8th		7th	
Cup of Nice								6th
Finlandia						6th		
Golden Spin							4th	
Nebelhorn					5th	7th	11th	
NRW Trophy						2nd	2nd	3rd
Ondrej Nepela					5th	2nd		
Pavel Roman					2nd	4th		3rd
Universiade						6th		
International: Junior and novice
Junior Worlds				10th				
JGP Bulgaria	9th		11th					
JGP Germany		12th						
JGP Hungary				WD				
JGP Mexico	9th							
JGP Poland			7th					
JGP Serbia		10th						
JGP Taiwan				8th				
Pavel Roman		4th J.	1st J.	3rd J.				
National
German Champ.	4th J.	2nd J.	2nd J.	1st J.	3rd	1st	2nd	3rd
J. = Junior, WD = Withdrew
