= Pamela O'Connor (figure skater) =

Scottish ice dancer

Personal information
- Born: 22 March 1980 (age 46) Glasgow, Scotland
- Height: 162 cm (5 ft 4 in)

Figure skating career
- Country: Great Britain
- Skating club: Deeside Nottingham
- Retired: 2005

Pamela "Pam" O'Connor (born 22 March 1980 in Glasgow) is a Scottish former ice dancer who competed internationally representing Great Britain. With her husband Jonathon O'Dougherty, she is the 2003 British national champion.

== Career ==
O'Connor competed with partner Jonathan O'Dougherty. They competed at one World Championships, finishing 19th in 2002, and twice at the European Championships, finishing 16th in 2003 and 14th in 2005. They won medals at several internationals – Finlandia Trophy, Pavel Roman Memorial, Ondrej Nepela Memorial, and Golden Spin of Zagreb – and one senior national title. They retired from competitive skating in 2005.

In 1999, O'Connor appeared as a young figure skater in a Robbie Williams music video.

O'Connor competed on the British and Australian versions of Dancing on Ice in 2006. In Dancing on Ice (UK) series 1, O'Connor was partnered with David Seaman and was voted out in the semi-final. In series 2 one year later, she was partnered with Neil Fox and was voted out in week 1.

== Personal life ==
O'Connor grew up in Cumbernauld and attended Cumbernauld High School. She is married to O'Dougherty.

== Programs ==
Season	Original dance	Free dance
2004–2005	Kick in the Head by Robbie Williams; Down with Love by Holly Palmer, Michael Buble	Tonight by Elton John
2003–2004	Swing	Moulin Rouge!

== Competitive highlights ==
(with Jonathon O'Dougherty)

Results
International
Event	1996–97	1997–98	1998–99	1999–00	2000–01	2001–02	2002–03	2003–04	2004–05	2005–06
Worlds							19th			
Europeans							16th		14th	
Bofrost Cup								7th	5th	
Finlandia Trophy								3rd		
Golden Spin							5th	2nd		
Karl Schäfer						6th				
Nebelhorn										8th
Ondrej Nepela					2nd		3rd			
Pavel Roman							1st			
International: Junior
Junior Worlds	17th									
National
British	1st J.	4th	5th	4th	3rd	2nd	1st	2nd	2nd	
J. = Junior level
