= Jonathon O'Dougherty =

Welsh ice dancer

Personal information
- Born: 22 February 1978 (age 48)
- Height: 172 cm (5.64 ft)

Figure skating career
- Country: Great Britain
- Skating club: Deeside Nottingham
- Retired: 2005

Jonathon O'Dougherty (born 22 February 1978), is a Welsh ice dancer who competed for Britain with his wife, Pamela O'Connor.

== Personal life ==
O'Dougherty was born in Wrexham, Wales on 22 February 1978. He graduated from South Nottingham College in 2004 with a degree in Sports Science. He graduated from San Jose State University. He has one brother, who also skated competitively.

O'Connor and O'Dougherty moved to California in 2004, then moved to Minnesota in 2007, where they married. They moved back to California in 2009, where they coached at Sharks Ice in San Jose, California. They then moved to Bozeman, MT where O'Dougherty serves as the Skating Director for the Gallatin Ice Foundation. He currently coaches at the Bozeman Figure Skating Club. They have two daughters, born in Bozeman.

== Career ==
O'Dougherty started to skate at age twelve. He was initially a singles skater. After switching to ice dancing. In 1995, he teamed up with O'Connor. They won the bronze medal at the British Junior ice dance championships in their first year together.

O'Connor and O'Dougherty competed at one World Championships, finishing 19th in 2002, and twice at the European Championships, finishing 16th in 2003 and 14th in 2005. They won medals at several internationals – Finlandia Trophy, Pavel Roman Memorial, Ondrej Nepela Memorial, and Golden Spin of Zagreb – and one senior national title. They trained in Great Britain and France until they moved to California to train with Sergei Ponomarenko and Marina Klimova, Olympic gold medalists.

In 1999, O'Dougherty appeared in Robbie Williams' music video for "She's the One".

O'Connor and O'Dougherty retired from competitive skating in 2005. They appeared in the 2006 Australian TV show, Torvill and Dean's Dancing on Ice. O'Dougherty's celebrity partner, Giaan Rooney, injured her ankle before the second episode.

O'Connor and O'Dougherty coach at the Sharks Ice in San Jose, California. They have coached several ice dancers and singles skaters, including Madeline Heritage and Nathan Fast, and Katie Dano.

== Programs ==
(with O'Connor)

Season	Original dance	Free dance
2004–2005	Kick in the Head by Robbie Williams; Down with Love by Holly Palmer, Michael Buble	Tonight by Elton John
2003–2004	Swing	Moulin Rouge!

== Competitive highlights ==
(with O'Connor)

Results
International
Event	1996–97	1997–98	1998–99	1999–00	2000–01	2001–02	2002–03	2003–04	2004–05	2005–06
Worlds							19th			
Europeans							16th		14th	
Bofrost Cup								7th	5th	
Finlandia Trophy								3rd		
Golden Spin							5th	2nd		
Karl Schäfer						6th				
Nebelhorn										8th
Ondrej Nepela					2nd		3rd			
Pavel Roman							1st			
International: Junior
Junior Worlds	17th									
National
British	1st J.	4th	5th	4th	3rd	2nd	1st	2nd	2nd	
J. = Junior level
