= Torvill and Dean's Dancing on Ice =

Australian television series

- Presented by: Jamie Durie; Sami Lukis
- Judges: Karen Barber; Alisa Camplin; Jason Gardiner; Belinda Noonan; Mark Storton
- Country of origin: Australia
- Original language: English
- No. of episodes: 8

Production
- Production locations: TCN-9, Willoughby, New South Wales; Sydney Ice Arena, Baulkham Hills, New South Wales
- Running time: 90–120 minutes (including commercials)

Original release
- Network: Nine Network
- Release: 11 July – 29 August 2006

Torvill and Dean's Dancing on Ice was an Australian reality television series which was based on the original British version, Dancing on Ice. The series premiered on the Nine Network on Tuesday, 11 July 2006 at 7:30 pm, and involved celebrities ice dancing on a specially constructed ice rink located in Sydney's north-west suburbs. The series ran for one season before being cancelled, and the winner of the competition was model Jake Wall. The series reportedly cost several million dollars to produce and received above-average ratings.

== Format ==
The couples competed against each other for a prize at the end of the series. The ten celebrities were teamed up with ten professional ice skaters and received special training from champion ice dancing duo Jayne Torvill and Christopher Dean themselves. Home viewers voted for their favourite couples and the couple with the fewest votes were voted off the show each week until a winner was decided. The show was run in a similar format to the Seven Network's rival dancing show Dancing with the Stars which had been a major hit for the Seven Network over the previous three years.

During training almost every contestant suffered an injury of some sort, the most serious of which being Michael Slater severing a tendon in his hand after it was accidentally skated over by his partner. Giaan Rooney dislocated her ankle just before the second episode of the series, and was forced to withdraw from the competition. Annalise Braakensiek twisted her ankle during the broadcast of the first episode, and was forced to withdraw as well.

The show was hosted by celebrity gardener and backyard designer Jamie Durie and former Today weather presenter Sami Lukis. It was based on the British ITV show Dancing on Ice, which also featured Torvill and Dean, and is also roughly similar to an earlier Nine program Skating on Thin Ice, also hosted by Durie, in 2005. Kristina, Pam and Matt were also skating partners for the celebrities in the original UK version.

UK judges Karen Barber and Jason Gardiner, were joined by Alisa Camplin, Belinda Noonan, and international ice dancing judge, Mark Storton, on the judging panel. The judges only made opinions; it was up to the home viewers to make decisions.

== Celebrities and their partners ==
Celebrity	Notability	Professional Partner	Status
Giaan Rooney	Olympic swimmer	Jonathon O'Dougherty	Withdrew due to injury
Trisha Broadbridge	2006 Young Australian of the Year	Alexandre Pavlov	Eliminated 1st
Annalise Braakensiek	Model & actress	Trent Nelson-Bond	Withdrew due to injury
Dermott Brereton	Former AFL player	Pam O'Connor	Eliminated 2nd
Jackie Kelly	Former Liberal Party member	Pavel Aubrecht	Eliminated 3rd
Michael Slater	New South Wales cricketer & television presenter	Anya D`Jamirze	Eliminated 4th
Jules Lund	Television & radio broadcaster	Kristina Cousins	Eliminated 5th
Lara Bingle	Model	Matt Evers	Eliminated 6th
Karl Stefanovic	Today presenter & journalist	Linda Aubrecht	Runner-Up
Jake Wall	Model	Maria Filippov	Winner

== Scoring chart ==
Couple	Place	1	2	3	4	5	6	7	8
Jake & Maria	1	22.5	23.0	24.0	22.5	26.5	26.0	26.0+22.0=48.0	27.5+26.5=54.0
Karl & Linda	2	21.0	20.5	20.0	23.5	17.0	24.5	23.0+22.5=45.5	25.0+27.5=52.5
Lara & Matt	3	19.0	20.0	22.5	25.0	23.5	23.0	22.5+26.5=49.0	
Jules & Kristina	4	12.0	11.5	14.5	16.5	17.0	20.5		
Michael & Anya	5	17.0	17.0	20.0	17.0	21.0			
Jackie & Pavel	6	19.0	19.0	18.5	21.0				
Dermott & Pam	7	15.5	16.0	14.0					
Annaliese & Trent	8	9.0							
Trisha & Alexandre	9	13.0	15.5						
Giaan & Jonathon	10	17.0							

Red numbers indicate the lowest score of the week
Green numbers indicate the highest score of the week
indicates that the couple were in the skate off
indicates that the couple were eliminated
indicates that the couple withdrew from the competition
indicates that the couple won
indicates that the couple came in second place

=== Average chart ===
This table only counts for dances scored on a traditional 30-point scale.

Rank by average	Place	Couple	Total	Number of dances	Average
1	1	Jake & Maria	246.5	10	24.7
2	3	Lara & Matt	182.0	8	22.8
3	2	Karl & Linda	224.5	10	22.5
4	6	Jackie & Pavel	77.5	4	19.4
5	5	Michael & Anya	92.0	5	18.4
6	10 (Withdrew)	Giaan & Jonathon	17.0	1	17.0
7	4	Jules & Kristina	92.0	6	15.3
8	7 (Withdrew from skate off)	Dermott & Pam	45.5	3	15.2
9	9	Trisha & Alexandre	28.5	2	14.3
10	8 (Withdrew)	Annaliese & Trent	9.0	1	9.0

== Live show details ==
=== Week 1 (11 July) ===
Order	Couple	Judges' scores					Total	Scoreboard	Skating song	Public Vote %	Result
Order	Couple	Noonan	Storton	Camplin	Gardiner	Barber	Total	Scoreboard	Skating song	Public Vote %	Result
1	Lara & Matt	4.0	4.0	3.0	3.0	5.0	19.0	=3rd	"Young Hearts Run Free"—Candi Staton		N/A
2	Michael & Anya	3.0	2.0	4.0	4.0	4.0	17.0	=5th	"I Love to Boogie"—T. Rex		N/A
3	Giaan & Jonathon	2.5	4.0	3.5	3.0	4.0	17.0	=5th	"You're Beautiful"—James Blunt		Withdrew
4	Jules & Kristina	4.0	1.0	2.0	1.5	3.5	12.0	9th	"A Little Less Conversation"—Elvis Presley vs. JXL		N/A
5	Annalise & Trent	1.5	2.0	1.0	1.5	3.0	9.0	10th	"Get the Party Started"—Pink		Withdrew
6	Dermott & Pam	4.5	2.5	2.5	2.5	3.5	15.5	7th	"Wild Thing"—The Troggs		N/A
7	Trisha & Alexandre	2.0	3.0	2.5	2.5	3.0	13.0	8th	"...Baby One More Time"—Britney Spears		N/A
8	Jake & Maria	4.5	4.5	4.5	4.0	5.0	22.5	1st	"A Fifth of Beethoven"—Walter Murphy and the Big Apple Band		N/A
9	Karl & Linda	5.0	3.5	4.0	4.0	4.5	21.0	2nd	"Crazy in Love"—Beyoncé featuring Jay-Z		N/A
10	Jackie & Pavel	3.5	4.0	4.0	3.5	4.0	19.0	=3rd	"Mad About the Boy"—Julie London		N/A

=== Week 2 (18 July) ===
Order	Couple	Judges' scores					Total	Scoreboard	Skating song	Public Vote %	Result
Order	Couple	Noonan	Storton	Camplin	Gardiner	Barber	Total	Scoreboard	Skating song	Public Vote %	Result
1	Jake & Maria	5.0	4.5	4.5	4.0	5.0	23.0	1st	"Rock DJ"—Robbie Williams		Safe
2	Jackie & Pavel	4.0	4.0	4.0	3.0	4.0	19.0	4th	"Hot Honey Rag"—from Chicago		Safe
3	Michael & Anya	4.0	3.0	3.5	3.0	3.5	17.0	5th	"Tainted Love"—Soft Cell		Bottom two
4	Dermott & Pam	2.5	2.5	4.0	3.5	3.5	16.0	6th	"Rhinestone Cowboy"—Glen Campbell		Safe
5	Trisha & Alexandre	3.5	3.0	3.0	2.0	4.0	15.5	7th	"You Raise Me Up"—Westlife		Eliminated
6	Lara & Matt	3.5	3.5	4.5	4.0	4.5	20.0	3rd	"It's Oh So Quiet"—Björk		Safe
7	Jules & Kristina	2.0	1.5	2.5	2.5	3.0	11.5	8th	"Hung Up"—Madonna		Safe
8	Karl & Linda	4.5	4.0	3.5	4.0	4.5	20.5	2nd	"Is This the Way to Amarillo"—Tony Christie		Safe

Judges' votes to save

- Noonan: Michael & Anya
- Storton: Michael & Anya
- Camplin: Trisha & Alexandre
- Gardiner: Michael & Anya
- Barber: Trisha & Alexandre

=== Week 3 (25 July) ===
Order	Couple	Judges' scores					Total	Scoreboard	Skating song	Public Vote %	Result
Order	Couple	Noonan	Storton	Camplin	Gardiner	Barber	Total	Scoreboard	Skating song	Public Vote %	Result
1	Karl & Linda	4.5	3.0	3.5	4.5	4.5	20.0	=3rd	"She's Always a Woman"—Billy Joel		Safe
2	Dermott & Pam	3.0	2.5	2.5	3.0	3.0	14.0	7th	"Crocodile Rock"—Elton John		Eliminated*
3	Jackie & Pavel	3.5	4.5	3.5	3.0	4.0	18.5	5th	"I Will Survive"—Gloria Gaynor		Bottom two
4	Michael & Anya	4.0	3.5	4.0	4.0	4.5	20.0	=3rd	"All That Jazz"—Catherine Zeta-Jones		Safe
5	Jake & Maria	4.5	5.0	5.0	4.5	5.0	24.0	1st	"Black Horse and the Cherry Tree"—KT Tunstall		Safe
6	Lara & Matt	3.0	5.0	4.5	5.0	5.0	22.5	2nd	"Time After Time"—Eva Cassidy		Safe
7	Jules & Kristina	2.5	2.0	3.0	3.0	4.0	14.5	6th	"I Got You (I Feel Good)"—James Brown		Safe

- During the skate off, Dermott decided that his bicep injury made him unable to face another performance, effectively leading to him being eliminated and sparing the judges from a vote.

=== Week 4 (1 August) ===
Order	Couple	Judges' scores					Total	Scoreboard	Skating song	Public Vote %	Result
Order	Couple	Noonan	Storton	Camplin	Gardiner	Barber	Total	Scoreboard	Skating song	Public Vote %	Result
1	Michael & Anya	4.0	3.5	3.5	2.5	3.5	17.0	5th	"It's Not Unusual"—Tom Jones		Bottom two
2	Jackie & Pavel	4.5	4.5	4.5	3.5	4.0	21.0	4th	"My Heart Will Go On"—Celine Dion		Eliminated
3	Jake & Maria	3.5	4.0	5.0	5.0	5.0	22.5	3rd	"Copacabana"—Barry Manilow		Safe
4	Karl & Linda	5.0	5.0	4.5	4.5	4.5	23.5	2nd	"Mack the Knife"—Bobby Darin		Safe
5	Jules & Kristina	3.5	3.0	3.5	3.0	3.5	16.5	6th	"Luck Be a Lady"—Frank Sinatra		Safe
6	Lara & Matt	5.0	5.0	5.0	5.0	5.0	25.0	1st	"Big Spender"—from Sweet Charity		Safe

Judges' votes to save

- Noonan: Jackie & Pavel
- Storton: Jackie & Pavel
- Camplin: Michael & Anya
- Gardiner: Michael & Anya
- Barber: Michael & Anya

=== Week 5 (8 August) ===
Order	Couple	Judges' scores					Total	Scoreboard	Skating song	Public Vote %	Result
Order	Couple	Noonan	Storton	Camplin	Gardiner	Barber	Total	Scoreboard	Skating song	Public Vote %	Result
1	Lara & Matt	4.5	4.5	4.5	5.0	5.0	23.5	2nd	"Push the Button"—Sugababes		Safe
2	Jake & Maria	5.5	5.0	5.0	5.5	5.5	26.5	1st	"All Time Love"—Will Young		Safe
3	Jules & Kristina	3.0	3.0	3.5	3.5	4.0	17.0	=4th	"Holding Out for a Hero"—Bonnie Tyler		Bottom two
4	Michael & Anya	5.0	4.0	4.0	3.5	4.5	21.0	3rd	"What a Wonderful World"—Louis Armstrong		Eliminated
5	Karl & Linda	3.0	3.5	3.5	3.0	4.0	17.0	=4th	"Relight My Fire"—Take That & Lulu		Safe

Judges' votes to save

- Noonan:
- Storton:
- Camplin:
- Gardiner:
- Barber:

=== Week 6 (15 August) ===
Order	Couple	Judges' scores					Total	Scoreboard	Skating song	Prop	Public Vote %	Result
Order	Couple	Noonan	Storton	Camplin	Gardiner	Barber	Total	Scoreboard	Skating song	Prop	Public Vote %	Result
1	Lara & Matt	4.0	4.5	4.5	5.0	5.0	23.0	3rd	"Cabaret"—from Cabaret	Chair		Bottom two
2	Karl & Linda	5.5	4.5	5.0	4.5	5.0	24.5	2nd	"You Can Leave Your Hat On"—Joe Cocker	Hat		Safe
3	Jules & Kristina	4.5	4.0	4.0	3.5	4.5	20.5	4th	"Mr. Bojangles"—Sammy Davis Jr.	Broom		Eliminated
4	Jake & Maria	5.5	5.0	5.0	5.0	5.5	26.0	1st	"Just a Little"—Liberty X	Canes		Safe

Judges' votes to save

- Noonan: Lara and Matt
- Storton: Lara and Matt
- Camplin: Lara and Matt
- Gardiner: Lara and Matt
- Barber: Lara and Matt

=== Week 7 (22 August) ===
Order	Couple	Judges' scores					Total	Grand total	Scoreboard	Skating song	Public Vote %	Result
Order	Couple	Noonan	Storton	Camplin	Gardiner	Barber	Total	Grand total	Scoreboard	Skating song	Public Vote %	Result
1	Jake & Maria	5.5	5.0	5.0	5.0	5.5	26.0	48.0	2nd	"Don't Stop Me Now"—Queen		Bottom two
1	Jake & Maria	4.0	4.5	4.5	4.5	4.5	22.0	48.0	2nd	"Flying Without Wings"—Westlife		Bottom two
2	Lara & Matt	4.0	4.5	4.5	4.5	5.0	22.5	49.0	1st	"(I've Had) The Time of My Life"—Bill Medley & Jennifer Warnes		Eliminated
2	Lara & Matt	5.5	5.5	5.5	5.0	5.0	26.5	49.0	1st	"Love Is in the Air"—John Paul Young		Eliminated
3	Karl & Linda	4.5	4.0	5.0	4.5	5.0	23.0	45.5	3rd	"Can't Take My Eyes Off You"—Andy Williams		Safe
3	Karl & Linda	5.0	4.5	4.5	4.0	4.5	22.5	45.5	3rd	"Fly Me to the Moon"—Frank Sinatra		Safe

Judges' votes to save

- Noonan: Jake & Maria
- Storton: Jake & Maria
- Camplin: Lara & Matt
- Gardiner: Lara & Matt
- Barber: Jake & Maria

=== Week 8 (29 August) ===
Order	Couple	Judges' scores					Total	Grand total	Scoreboard	Skating song	Public Vote %	Result
Order	Couple	Noonan	Storton	Camplin	Gardiner	Barber	Total	Grand total	Scoreboard	Skating song	Public Vote %	Result
1	Karl & Linda	5.0	5.0	5.0	5.0	5.0	25.0	52.5	2nd	"Mack the Knife"—Bobby Darin		Runner-up
1	Karl & Linda	5.5	5.5	5.5	5.5	5.5	27.5	52.5	2nd	"Boléro"		Runner-up
2	Jake & Maria	6.0	5.0	5.5	5.5	5.5	27.5	54.0	1st	"Black Horse and the Cherry Tree"—KT Tunstall		Winner
2	Jake & Maria	5.0	5.0	5.5	5.5	5.5	26.5	54.0	1st	"Boléro"		Winner

== Ratings ==
The ratings for the show during the eight-week season were high in its timeslot with the series premiere being 1.61 million viewers, over the course of the rest of the season viewership was between 1.2 and 1.1 million viewers, with 1.42 million watching the grand final. Despite strong viewership figures, the show was axed due to high production costs and mostly negative reviews from critics.

== Plans of a reunion special ==
During the series, the Nine Network planned a live reunion special, also hosted by Durie and Lukis. It would feature all ten celebrities talking about their experiences during the series, and answering questions from a live studio audience. The main highlight would be Torvill and Dean themselves making a very special guest appearance in the studio towards the end, when they would congratulate the contestants, hosts and judges, and of course, the real winners of the series, which were the home viewers, for their votes. Following the cancellation of the show, the reunion special was also cancelled.

== See also ==
- Torvill and Dean
