= Joanna Budner =

Polish ice dancer

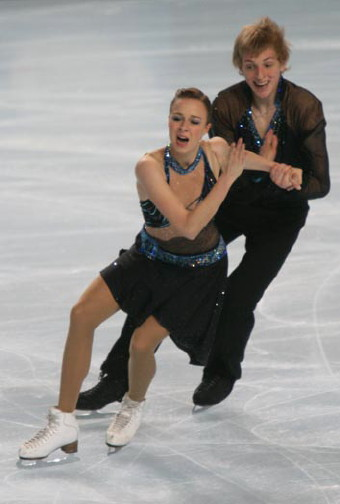
- Budner & Mościcki at the 2008 Trophée Eric Bompard

Personal information
- Born: December 27, 1988 (age 37)
- Height: 1.65 m (5 ft 5 in)

Figure skating career
- Country: Poland
- Coach: Bozena Bernadovska, Alexei Gorshkov
- Skating club: FSC Lodz
- Retired: 2009

Joanna Budner (born December 27, 1988, in Łódź, Poland) is a Polish former ice dancer. With partner Jan Mościcki, she is a three-time (2007–2009) Polish national champion. Their partnership ended following the 2008–2009 season, and she retired shortly afterwards.

== Competitive highlights ==
Event	2002–03	2003–04	2004–05	2005–06	2006–07	2007–08	2008–09
World Championships						26th	24th
European Championships					21st	19th	20th
World Junior Championships		23rd	16th	12th	13th		
Polish Championships	3rd J.	1st J.	1st J.	1st J.	1st	1st	1st
Trophée Eric Bompard							10th
Finlandia Trophy							8th
Golden Spin of Zagreb						10th	
Ice Dance Cup				2nd J.			
NRW Trophy						WD	3rd
Pavel Roman Memorial	8th J.	2nd J.	WD	2nd J.	2nd		
JGP, Austria						7th	
JGP, Romania						6th	
JGP, Norway					5th		
JGP, Andorra				6th			
JGP, Germany			9th				
JGP, Poland		12th					
JGP, Bulgaria		8th		8th			
JGP, Serbia	13th						
JGP, France	7th		10th		7th		

- N = Novice level; J = Junior level; WD = Withdrew
- JGP = Junior Grand Prix
