= Gina Zehnder =

Swiss ice dancer (born 2005)

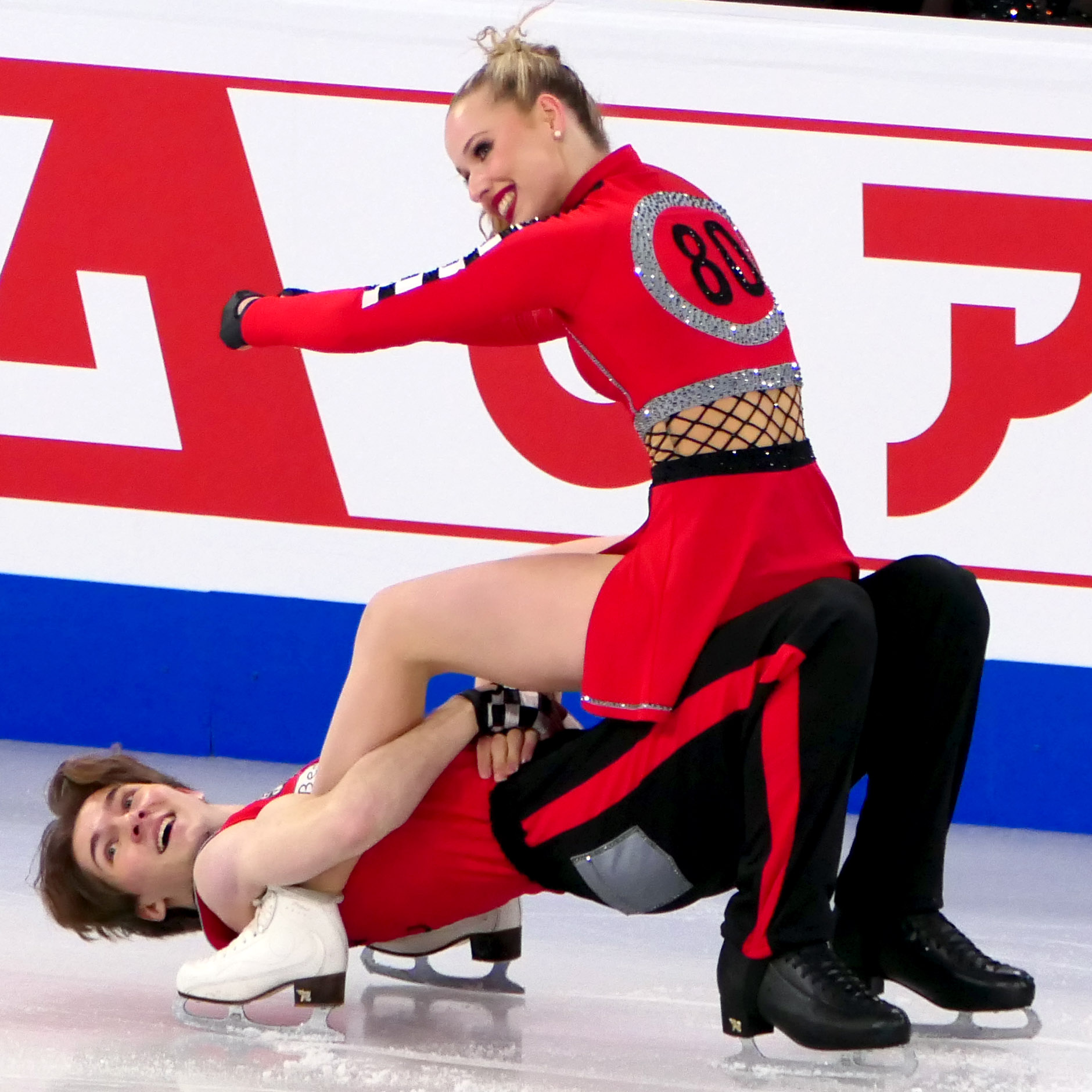
- Gina Zehnder and Beda Leon Sieber at the 2024 World Championships

Personal information
- Born: 5 August 2005 (age 21) Zürich, Switzerland
- Home town: Küsnacht, Switzerland
- Height: 1.68 m (5 ft 6 in)

Figure skating career
- Country: Switzerland
- Discipline: Ice dance
- Partner: Beda Leon Sieber
- Coach: Alisa Besseghier; Lucie Myslivečková
- Skating club: Eislaufclub Küsnacht
- Began skating: 2009

Medal record
Swiss Championships
Gold medal – first place	2025 Geneva	Ice dance
Gold medal – first place	2026 Lugano	Ice dance

Gina Zehnder (born 5 August 2005) is a Swiss ice dancer. With her skating partner, Beda Leon Sieber, she is the 2026 Maria Olszewska Memorial champion, 2023 JGP Turkey bronze medalist, and a two-time Swiss national champion (2025-26). Zehnder/Sieber are the first Swiss ice dance team, junior or senior, to win a medal at an ISU Grand Prix event.

== Personal life ==
Zehnder was born on 5 August 2005 in Zürich, Switzerland. She has two sisters.

== Career ==
=== Early years ===
Zehnder began learning how to skate at age five after following her older sister into the sport. She competed as a single skater at the novice level through the 2018–19 season. In January 2019, Zehnder's coach Cornelia Leroy presented both her and her now partner, Beda Leon Sieber, with the opportunity to compete as a dance team at the 2020 Winter Youth Olympics, a home event for the Swiss teenagers, and together, they chose to switch disciplines with that goal in mind.

=== 2019–20 season: Debut of Zehnder/Sieber ===
Zehnder/Sieber made their junior international debut as an ice dance team at the 2019 Ice Star in October, where they finished twenty-third. They gained further competitive experience at two additional international events over the fall of 2019, the 2019 Pavel Roman Memorial and the 2019 Bosphorus Cup, where they placed sixteenth and nineteenth, respectively.

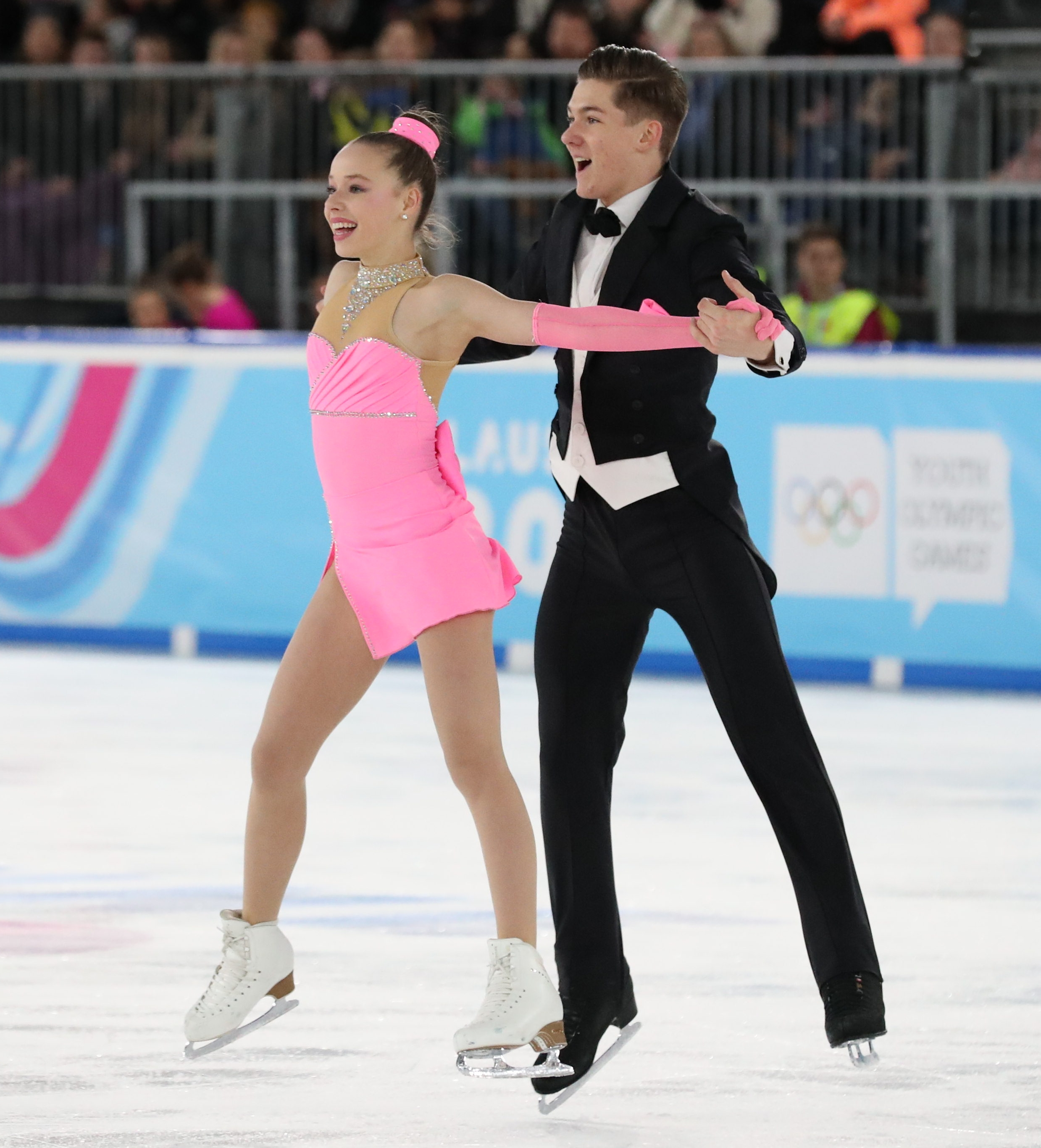
Zehnder and Sieber at the 2020 Youth Olympics

In order to achieve their goal of receiving the ice dance host pick spot at the 2020 Winter Youth Olympics in Lausanne, Zehnder and Sieber needed to be the top junior dance team at the 2020 Swiss Figure Skating Championships in December. Despite being newcomers to ice dance with less than a year of training together under their belts, Zehnder and Sieber won the national title by an over nine-point margin over silver medalists Alina Klein and Maxim Kobelt, and were named to the Swiss Youth Olympic team.

At the Youth Olympics in January, then-14-year-old Zehnder had the honor of lighting the cauldron at the event's opening ceremony as the youngest athlete in the Swiss delegation. During the ice dance competition, Zehnder and Sieber placed twelfth in both the rhythm dance and the free dance for a twelfth-place finish overall in the individual event. The duo were also included in the Mixed NOC Team Trophy, grouped into Team Motivation with Ukrainian and Italian single skaters Andrey Kokura and Alessia Tornaghi, and Russian pair team Diana Mukhametzianova/Ilya Mironov. Zehnder and Sieber placed eighth in the team ice dance event, and Team Motivation finished fifth of eight overall.

Zehnder and Sieber concluded their debut season at the 2020 World Junior Championships where they placed twenty-ninth in the rhythm dance and did not advance to the final segment of competition.

=== 2021–22 season ===
Travel restrictions and health concerns related to the COVID-19 pandemic prevented Zehnder/Sieber from competing during the 2020–21 season. The team returned to international competition in September 2021 for their ISU Junior Grand Prix debut at the 2021 JGP Russia. In Krasnoyarsk, the team placed fifteenth in the rhythm dance and fourteenth in the free dance for fourteenth-place finish overall. They replicated this placement at their next event in October, the 2021 JGP Austria. Zehnder/Sieber competed at one final event in the fall in the lead up to their national championships, the 2021 Autumn Talents Cup, where they claimed their first international medal, a silver behind Ukrainian team Myroslava Tkachenko/Andrii Kapran.

In November, Zehnder/Sieber defended their junior national title at the 2021 Swiss Figure Skating Championships, winning gold again by an approximately nine-point margin, this time over compatriots Kayleigh Maksymec/Maxmilien Rahier. The team was initially named to the Swiss berth at the 2022 World Junior Championships, but were forced to withdraw after Zehnder sustained a knee injury. Zehnder/Sieber ultimately concluded their season at the 2022 Egna Dance Trophy, where they finished thirteenth.

=== 2022–23 season ===
Zehnder's knee injury continued to impact the team's ability to train throughout 2022. They finally returned to the ice in September, opting to withdraw from their Junior Grand Prix assignments due to lack of preparation time. Zehnder and Sieber opened their competitive season at the 2022 Bosphorus Cup where they placed fourth. The team's only other event during the season was the 2022 Swiss Figure Skating Championships where they placed second in the junior dance category behind Milla O'Brien and Laurin Wiederkehr.

=== 2023–24 season: Junior Grand Prix bronze and senior debut ===
Fully recovered from injury, Zehnder/Sieber returned to the Junior Grand Prix circuit for their fourth competitive season as a team. At their first assignment, the 2023 JGP Turkey, the team placed fourth in the rhythm dance, but rose to first in the free dance, ultimately placing third overall. Their bronze medal marked the first medal for a Swiss ice dance team at any ISU Grand Prix event, junior or senior.

At their second JGP assignment, the 2023 JGP Poland, Zehnder/Sieber finished in fourth place. They followed up this result by winning the 2023 Swiss Open on the junior level and taking bronze at the 2023 Pavel Roman Memorial on the junior level.

In late November, Zehnder/Sieber debuted on the senior international level by winning silver at the 2023 Bosphorus Cup. They then went on to win the junior national title at the 2024 Swiss Championships.

Following a silver medal win on the junior level at the 2024 Ephesus Cup, Zehnder/Sieber placed fourteenth at the 2024 World Junior Championships in Taipei, Taiwan.

Selected to compete at the 2024 World Championships in Montreal, Quebec, Canada, Zehnder/Sieber placed thirty-second in the rhythm dance and did not advance to the free dance segment of the competition.

=== 2024–25 season: First Swiss national title ===
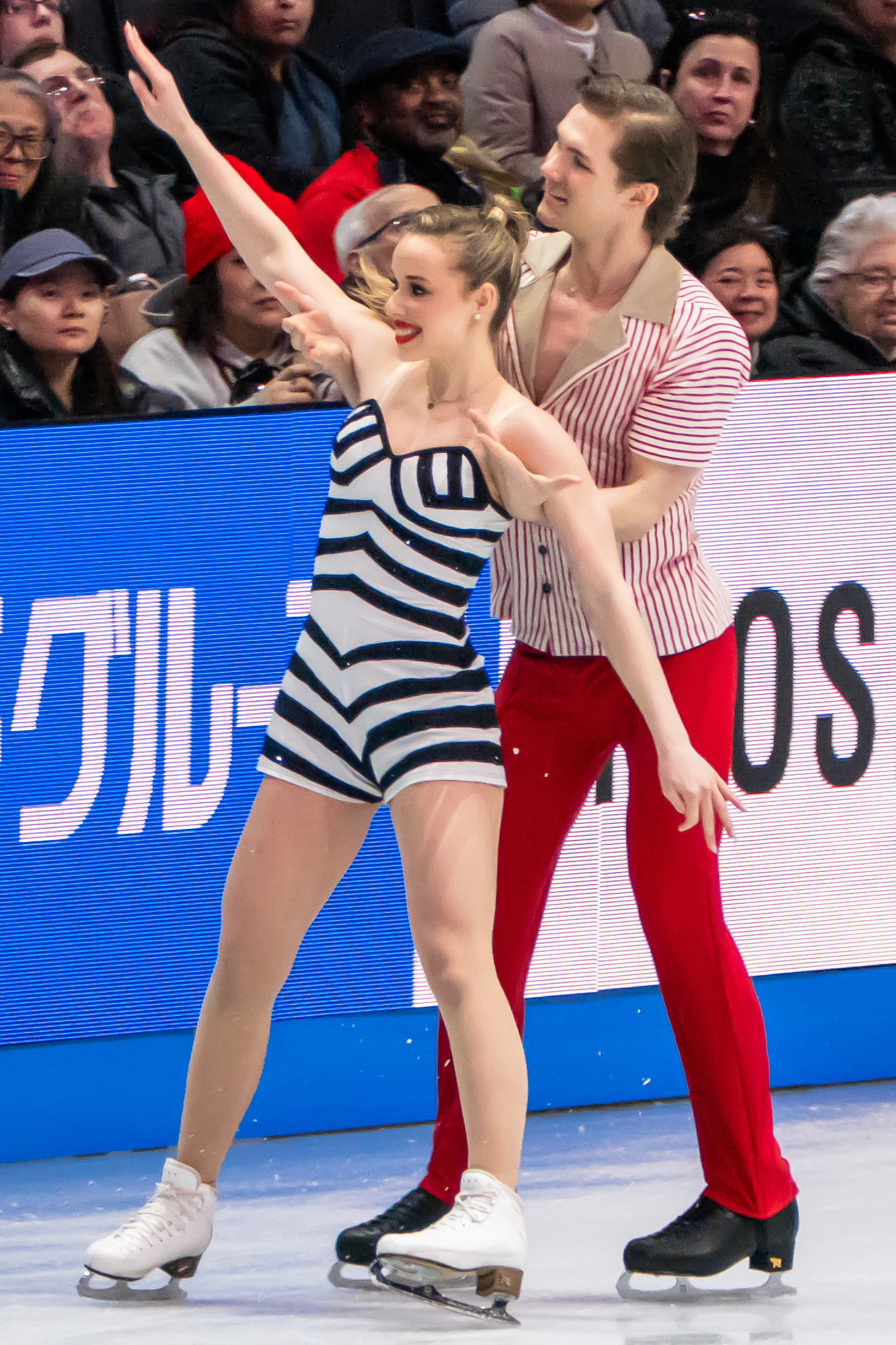
Zehnder/Sieber performing their rhythm dance at the 2025 World Championships

Zehnder/Sieber started the season by competing on the 2024–25 ISU Junior Grand Prix, placing fifth at 2024 JGP Turkey and at 2024 JGP Slovenia. They subsequently went on to win the silver medal on the junior level at the 2024 Budapest Trophy.

Going on to compete on the senior international level, Zehnder/Sieber won the bronze medal at the 2024 Pavel Roman Memorial and finishing fourth at the 2024 Bosphorus Cup. In December, the team won their first senior national title at the 2025 Swiss Championships. The following month, Zehnder/Sieber made their European Championship debut at the 2025 European Championships in Tallinn, Estonia. The team placed twenty-third in the rhythm dance and did not advance to the free dance segment of the competition.

Following a silver medal win on the junior level at the 2025 International Challenge Cup, Zehnder/Sieber placed twelfth at the 2025 World Junior Championships in Debrecen, Hungary.

They then finished the season by placing thirtieth at the 2025 World Championships in Boston, Massachusetts, United States.

Zehnder noted that heading into the 2025–26 figure skating season, the team wanted to improve on their technical score. She said, "At all the big competitions, we didn’t get the levels we wanted to. So, I think that’s, especially during summer now, what we’re going to work on. To get better levels in the step sequences and the one-foot section."

=== 2025–26 season ===
Initially assigned to compete at the 2025 CS Nepela Memorial and the 2025 CS Trialeti Trophy in early fall, Zehnder/Sieber were forced to withdraw from both events due to Zehnder requiring a small surgery on her foot.

Their season began in late October at the 2025 Swiss Open, where they finished in fourth place. A couple weeks later, they placed sixth at the 2025 NRW Trophy. They then competed on the 2025–26 Challenger Series, finishing tenth at the 2025 CS Tallinn Trophy and sixteenth at the 2025 CS Golden Spin of Zagreb.

In December, they won their second consecutive national title at the 2026 Swiss Championships. The following month, the duo competed at the 2026 European Championships in Sheffield, England, United Kingdom. They finished in twenty-first place and were only 0.12 points from qualifying for the free dance segment.

== Programs ==
=== Ice dance with Beda Leon Sieber ===
Season	Short program	Free skating
2025–2026	La Copa de la Vida by Ricky Martin; Carnaval de Paris by Dario G; La Copa de la Vida by Ricky Martin choreo. by Alisa Besseghier	The Truman Show; Trutalk by Burkhard Dallwitz; Truman Sleeps; Dreaming of Fiji by Philip Glass; Escape from Illusion by Karl Hugo choreo. by Alisa Besseghier
2024–2025	Barbken Dollhouse by Karl Hugo; Put Your Head on My Shoulder by Paul Anka; Let's Twist Again by Chubby Checker choreo. by Cornelia Leroy, Alisa Besseghier	Edward Scissorhands by Danny Elfman; Black Marlin by Parov Stelar; Voices from a Gothic Castle by Karl Hugo choreo. by Cornelia Leroy, Alisa Besseghier
2023–2024	The Race by Yello arr. by Hugo Chouinard; Joe le taxi by Vanessa Paradis choreo. by Cornelia Leroy, Alisa Besseghier	This Bitter Earth / On the Nature of Daylight by Dinah Washington and Max Richter choreo. by Cornelia Leroy, Alisa Besseghier
2022–2023	Tango: Dark Tango by Edo Notarloberti; Spanish Waltz: Amor Dulce Muerte; Flamenco: Poeta en el Mar by Vicente Amigo choreo. by Cornelia Leroy, Alisa Besseghier	This Bitter Earth / On the Nature of Daylight by Dinah Washington and Max Richter choreo. by Cornelia Leroy, Alisa Besseghier
2021–2022	Proud Mary performed by Ike & Tina Turner choreo. by Cornelia Leroy, Alisa Besseghier	Time by Nathan Lanier; Time Lapse; Run by Ludovico Einaudi choreo. by Cornelia Leroy, Alisa Besseghier
2020–2021	Will You Love Me Tomorrow; Take Good Care of My Baby; (You Make Me Feel Like) A Natural Woman (from Beautiful: The Carole King Musical) choreo. by Cornelia Leroy, Alisa Besseghier	Time by Nathan Lanier; Time Lapse; Run by Ludovico Einaudi choreo. by Cornelia Leroy, Alisa Besseghier
2019–2020	I Wanna Be Loved by You performed by Marilyn Monroe; Sparkling Diamonds (from Moulin Rouge!) by Nicole Kidman choreo. by Karine Arribert-Narce	Overture (from Ghost) by Dave Stewart and Glen Ballard; Latch (acoustic) by Sam Smith; Unchained Melody performed by Glee Cast choreo. by Karine Arribert-Narce

== Competitive highlights ==
=== Ice dance with Beda Leon Sieber ===
- JGP – Event of the ISU Junior Grand Prix Series
- CS – Event of the ISU Challenger Series
- TBD – Assigned
- WD – Withdrew from competition

Competition placements at senior level
Season	2023–24	2024–25	2025–26	2026–27
World Championships	32nd	30th	28th	
European Championships		23rd	21st	
Swiss Championships		1st	1st	
CS Budapest Trophy				17th
CS Golden Spin of Zagreb			16th	
CS Tallinn Trophy			10th	
CS Nepela Memorial				14th
Maria Olszewska Memorial			1st	
NRW Trophy			6th	
Pavel Roman Memorial		3rd		
Bosphorus Cup	2nd	4th		

Competition placements at junior level
Season	2019–20	2021–22	2022–23	2023–24	2024–25
Winter Youth Olympics	12th				
Winter Youth Olympics (Team event)	5th				
World Junior Championships	29th			14th	12th
Swiss Championships	1st	1st	2nd	1st	
JGP Austria		14th			
JGP Poland				4th	
JGP Russia		14th			
JGP Slovenia					5th
JGP Turkey				3rd	5th
Autumn Talents Cup		2nd			
Bosphorus Cup	19th		4th		
Budapest Trophy					2nd
Challenge Cup					2nd
Egna Dance Trophy		13th			
Ephesus Cup				2nd	
Ice Star	23rd				
Pavel Roman Memorial	16th			3rd	
Swiss Open				1st	

== Detailed results ==
=== Ice dance with Beda Leon Sieber ===
ISU personal best scores in the +5/-5 GOE System
Segment	Type	Score	Event
Total	TSS	154.42	2025 CS Tallinn Trophy
Short program	TSS	62.71	2024 JGP Slovenia
Short program	TES	35.29	2025 CS Tallinn Trophy
Short program	PCS	28.59	2024 JGP Turkey
Free skating	TSS	92.73	2025 CS Tallinn Trophy
Free skating	TES	52.33	2025 CS Tallinn Trophy
Free skating	PCS	43.08	2023 JGP Poland

==== Senior level ====
Results in the 2023–24 season
Date	Event	SP		FS		Total	
Date	Event	P	Score	P	Score	P	Score
Nov 27 – Dec 3, 2023	(Turkey) 2023 Bosphorus Cup	2	73.18	2	113.29	2	186.47
Mar 18–24, 2024	(Canada) 2024 World Championships	32	58.19	—N/a	—N/a	32	58.19

Results in the 2024–25 season
Date	Event	SP		FS		Total	
Date	Event	P	Score	P	Score	P	Score
Nov 8–10, 2024	(Czech Republic) 2024 Pavel Roman Memorial	3	66.88	3	102.19	3	169.07
Nov 25 – Dec 1, 2024	(Turkey) 2024 Bosphorus Cup	5	64.77	4	100.01	4	164.78
Dec 13–15, 2024	(Switzerland) 2025 Swiss Championships	1	67.58	1	102.79	1	170.37
Jan 28 – Feb 2, 2025	(Estonia) 2025 European Championships	23	53.44	—N/a	—N/a	23	53.44
Mar 25–30, 2024	(United States) 2025 World Championships	30	57.07	—N/a	—N/a	30	57.07

Results in the 2025–26 season
Date	Event	RD		FD		Total	
Date	Event	P	Score	P	Score	P	Score
Oct 23–26, 2025	(Estonia) 2025 Swiss Open	76	52.68	4	82.12	4	134.80
Nov 13–16, 2025	(Germany) 2025 NRW Trophy	7	58.43	6	92.02	6	150.45
Nov 25–30, 2025	(Estonia) 2025 CS Tallinn Trophy	9	61.69	11	92.73	10	154.42
Dec 3–6, 2025	(Croatia) 2025 CS Golden Spin of Zagreb	16	53.78	14	86.24	16	140.02
Dec 19–21, 2025	(Switzerland) 2026 Swiss Championships	2	62.06	1	99.35	1	161.41
Jan 13–18, 2026	(United Kingdom) 2026 European Championships	21	59.12	—N/a	—N/a	21	59.12
Feb 24-28, 2026	(Poland) 2026 Maria Olszewska Memorial	2	62.30	1	100.39	1	162.69
Mar 24–29, 2026	(Czech Republic) 2026 World Championships	28	59.34	—N/a	—N/a	28	59.34

Results in the 2026–27 season
Date	Event	SP		FS		Total	
Date	Event	P	Score	P	Score	P	Score
Sep 24–27, 2026	(Slovakia) 2026 CS Nepela Memorial	16	55.53	13	89.89	14	145.42

==== Junior level ====
Results in the 2023–24 season
Date	Event	RD		FD		Total	
Date	Event	P	Score	P	Score	P	Score
Sep 6–9, 2023	2023 JGP Turkey	4	55.35	1	88.30	3	143.65
Sep 27–30, 2023	2023 JGP Poland	4	59.65	4	88.92	4	148.57
Oct 26–29, 2023	(Switzerland) 2023 Swiss Open	1	59.09	1	87.63	1	146.72
Nov 10–12, 2023	(Czech Republic) 2023 Pavel Roman Memorial	3	63.46	3	89.97	3	153.43
Dec 15–17, 2023	(Switzerland) 2024 Swiss Championships (Junior)	1	61.19	1	90.18	1	151.37
Jan 25–28, 2024	(Turkey) 2024 Ephesus Cup	2	60.19	1	95.75	2	155.94
Feb 26 – Mar 3, 2024	(Taiwan) 2024 World Junior Championships	9	58.90	16	77.15	14	136.05

Results in the 2024–25 season
Date	Event	RD		FD		Total	
Date	Event	P	Score	P	Score	P	Score
Sep 18–21, 2024	2024 JGP Turkey	4	60.85	6	85.73	5	146.58
Oct 2–5, 2024	2024 JGP Slovenia	5	62.71	5	90.58	5	153.29
Oct 11–13, 2024	(Hungary) 2024 Budapest Trophy	2	61.19	2	94.25	2	155.44
Feb 13-16, 2025	(Netherlands) 2025 Challenge Cup	2	55.79	2	91.02	2	146.81
Feb 25 – Mar 2, 2025	(Hungary) 2025 World Junior Championships	12	55.72	13	83.27	12	138.99
