= 2012 German Figure Skating Championships =

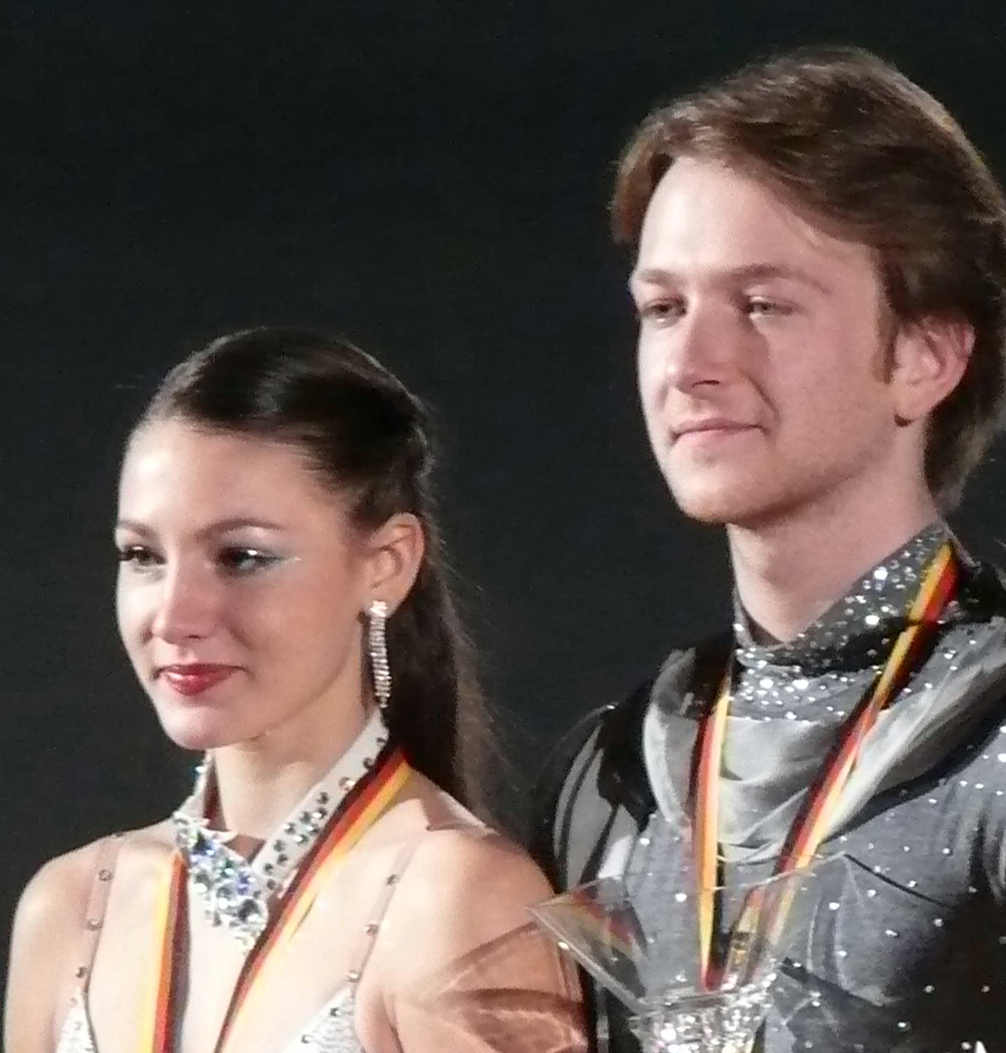
- Kolbe Caruso GER Germans 2012
- Type: National Championship
- Date: January 6 – 7, 2012
- Season: 2011–12
- Location: Oberstdorf
- Venue: iceDome Eissportzentrum Oberstdorf
- Previous: 2011 German Championships
- Next: 2013 German Championships

The 2012 German Figure Skating Championships (German: Deutsche Meisterschaften im Eiskunstlaufen 2012) took place on January 6–7, 2012 in at the Eissportzentrum Oberstdorf in Oberstdorf. Skaters competed in the disciplines of men's singles, women's singles, pair skating, and ice dance on the senior, junior, and novice levels. The results of the national championships were among the criteria used to choose the German teams to the 2012 World Championships and 2012 European Championships.

== Medalists ==
=== Senior ===
Discipline	Gold	Silver	Bronze
Men	Peter Liebers	Paul Fentz	Martin Rappe
Ladies	Nicole Schott	Isabel Drescher	Katharina Zientek
Pairs	Maylin Hausch / Daniel Wende	Mari Vartmann / Aaron Van Cleave	No other competitors
Ice dancing	Nelli Zhiganshina / Alexander Gazsi	Tanja Kolbe / Stefano Caruso	Carolina Hermann / Daniel Hermann

=== Junior ===
Discipline	Gold	Silver	Bronze
Men	Niko Ulanovsky	Alexander Schöpke	Panagiotis Polizoakis
Ladies	Angelika Dubinski	Maria-Katharina Herceg	Anna Baumgartel
Pairs	Annabelle Prölß / Ruben Blommaert	Julia Linckh / Konrad Hocker-Scholler	Christin Schotte / Kevin Kottek
Ice dancing	Shari Koch / Christian Nüchtern	Katharina Muller / Justin Gerke	Kathrin Häuser / Sevan Lerche

== Senior results ==
=== Men's singles ===
Rank	Name	Total points	SP		FS	
1	Peter Liebers	221.36	1	79.34	1	142.02
2	Paul Fentz	184.71	2	66.73	2	117.98
3	Martin Rappe	176.45	3	62.01	3	114.44
4	Denis Wieczorek	169.59	4	55.20	4	114.39
5	Franz Streubel	153.37	5	52.92	5	100.45
6	Norman Keck	145.09	6	49.47	6	95.62

=== Women's singles ===
Rank	Name	Total points	SP		FS	
1	Nicole Schott	131.65	2	45.23	1	86.42
2	Isabel Drescher	129.01	3	44.03	2	84.98
3	Katharina Zientek	126.62	5	43.38	3	83.24
4	Sandy Hoffmann	123.13	6	42.15	4	80.98
5	Julia Pfrengle	120.60	4	43.74	5	76.86
6	Nathalie Weinzierl	114.88	1	48.27	9	66.61
7	Christina Erdel	107.19	8	37.51	6	69.68
8	Luisa Weber	105.01	7	40.14	10	64.87
9	Jennifer Parker	104.79	11	35.84	7	68.95
10	Jennifer Urban	100.28	10	36.01	11	64.27
11	Jacqueline Drange	97.64	13	30.17	8	67.47
12	Jil Kötting	84.06	14	29.90	12	54.16
13	Katharina Helwert	79.29	12	30.88	13	48.41
WD	Jessica Füssinger	WD	9	36.53	Withdrew from competition	

=== Pair skating ===
Rank	Name	Total points	SP		FS	
1	Maylin Hausch / Daniel Wende	157.82	1	55.56	1	102.26
2	Mari Vartmann / Aaron Van Cleave	133.45	2	48.82	2	84.63

=== Ice dance ===
Rank	Name	Total points	SD		FD	
1	Nelli Zhiganshina / Alexander Gazsi	157.42	1	64.82	1	92.60
2	Tanja Kolbe / Stefano Caruso	122.52	2	50.68	3	71.84
3	Carolina Hermann / Daniel Hermann	121.35	3	49.31	2	72.04

== Junior results ==
The 2011–12 competition for Junior, Jugend, and Nachwuchs levels was held from December 14–18, 2011 in Oberstdorf.

=== Men's singles ===
Rank	Name	Total points	SP		FS	
1	Niko Ulanovsky	156.55	1	50.73	2	105.82
2	Alexander Schöpke	153.78	4	46.01	1	107.77
3	Panagiotis Polizoakis	141.28	2	48.65	3	92.63
4	Christopher Hüttl	128.00	3	47.18	5	80.82
5	Vincent Hey	127.08	10	38.09	4	88.99

+ 10 competitors

=== Women's singles ===
Rank	Name	Total points	SP		FS	
1	Angelika Dubinski	127.94	3	42.86	1	85.08
2	Maria-Katharina Herceg	118.75	1	44.84	2	73.91
3	Anna Baumgärtel	111.31	4	42.52	3	68.79
4	Anneli Kawelke	110.36	6	41.68	4	68.68
5	Juliette Höhn	105.72	5	41.98	9	63.74

+ 36 competitors

=== Pair skating ===
Rank	Name	Total points	SP		FS	
1	Annabelle Prölß / Ruben Blommaert	118.01	1	38.61	1	79.40
2	Julia Linckh / Konrad Hocker-Scholler	96.25	3	33.88	2	62.37
3	Christin Schotte / Kevin Kottek	88.37	4	33.45	3	54.92
4	Katharina Lesser / Timo Müller	72.12	5	24.15	4	47.97
WD	Vanessa Bauer / Nolan Seegert	WD	2	37.89	Withdrew from competition	

=== Ice dance ===
Rank	Name	Total points	SD		FD	
1	Shari Koch / Christian Nüchtern	130.88	1	55.91	1	74.97
2	Katharina Müller / Justin Gerke	106.55	2	43.04	2	63.51
3	Kathrin Häuser / Sevan Lerche	101.23	4	40.15	3	61.08

+ 7 other couples
