= Angelika Dubinski =

German figure skater

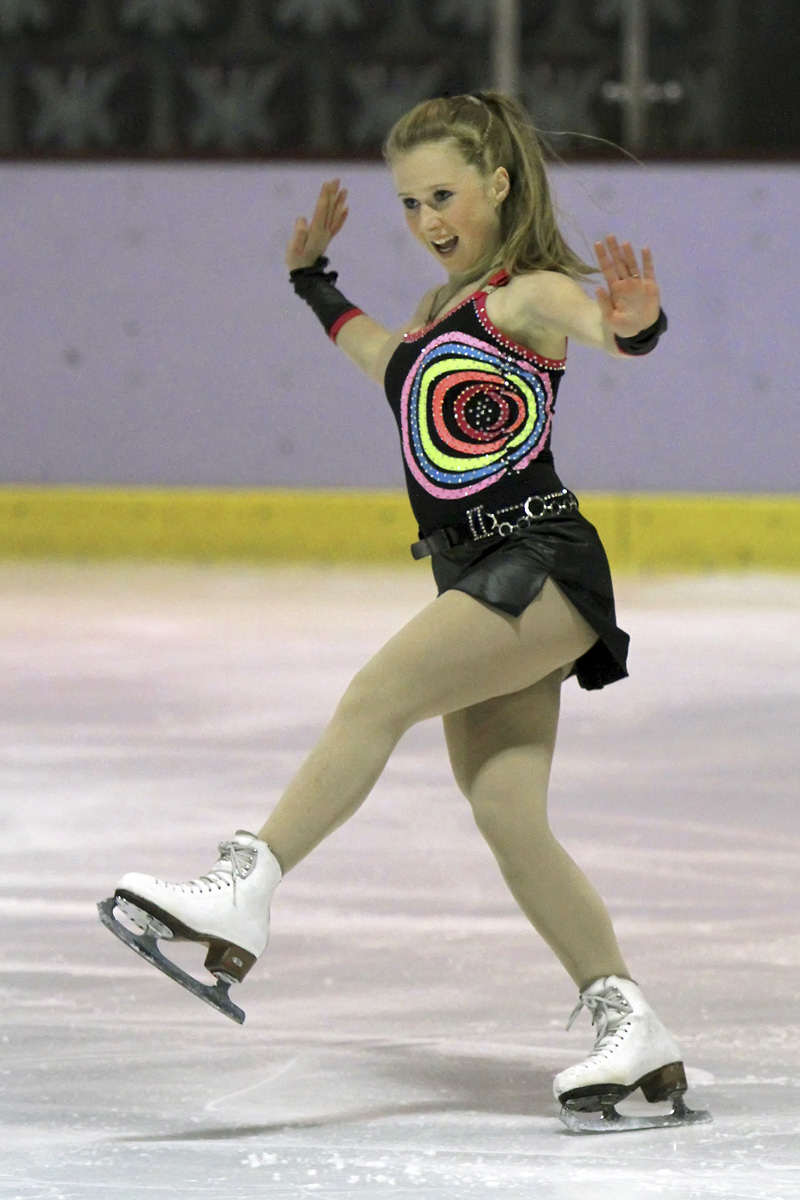
- Angelika Dubinski (GER)

Personal information
- Full name: Angelika Dubinski
- Born: 30 July 1995 (age 30) Georgsmarienhütte, Germany
- Home town: Berlin
- Height: 1.54 m (5 ft 1 in)

Figure skating career
- Country: Germany
- Coach: Lena Lazarenko
- Skating club: Berliner Sport-Verein 1892
- Began skating: 2000

Angelika Dubinski (born 30 July 1995 in Georgsmarienhütte, Germany) is a German figure skater. She is the 2012 German national junior champion.

== Programs ==
Season	Short program	Free skating
2011–2012	Selection of music by Yello	Dark Angel by Edvin Marton

== Results ==
Results
International
Event	2007-08	2008–09	2009–10	2010–11	2011–12	2012–13	2013–14
Bavarian Open						30th	
Cup of Nice						24th	
Ice Challenge						24th	
International: Junior
Junior Worlds					28th		
JGP Romania					16th J.		
NRW Trophy			4th J.	5th J.	1st J.	25th J.	
Mont Blanc				6th J.			
Skate Celje						2nd J.	9th J.
National
German Champ.	8th N.	6th N.	12th J.	7th J.	1st J.	10th	
JGP = Junior Grand Prix; Levels: N. = Novice; J. = Junior
