= Zimní stadion Olomouc =

Ice hockey venue in Olomouc, Czech Republic

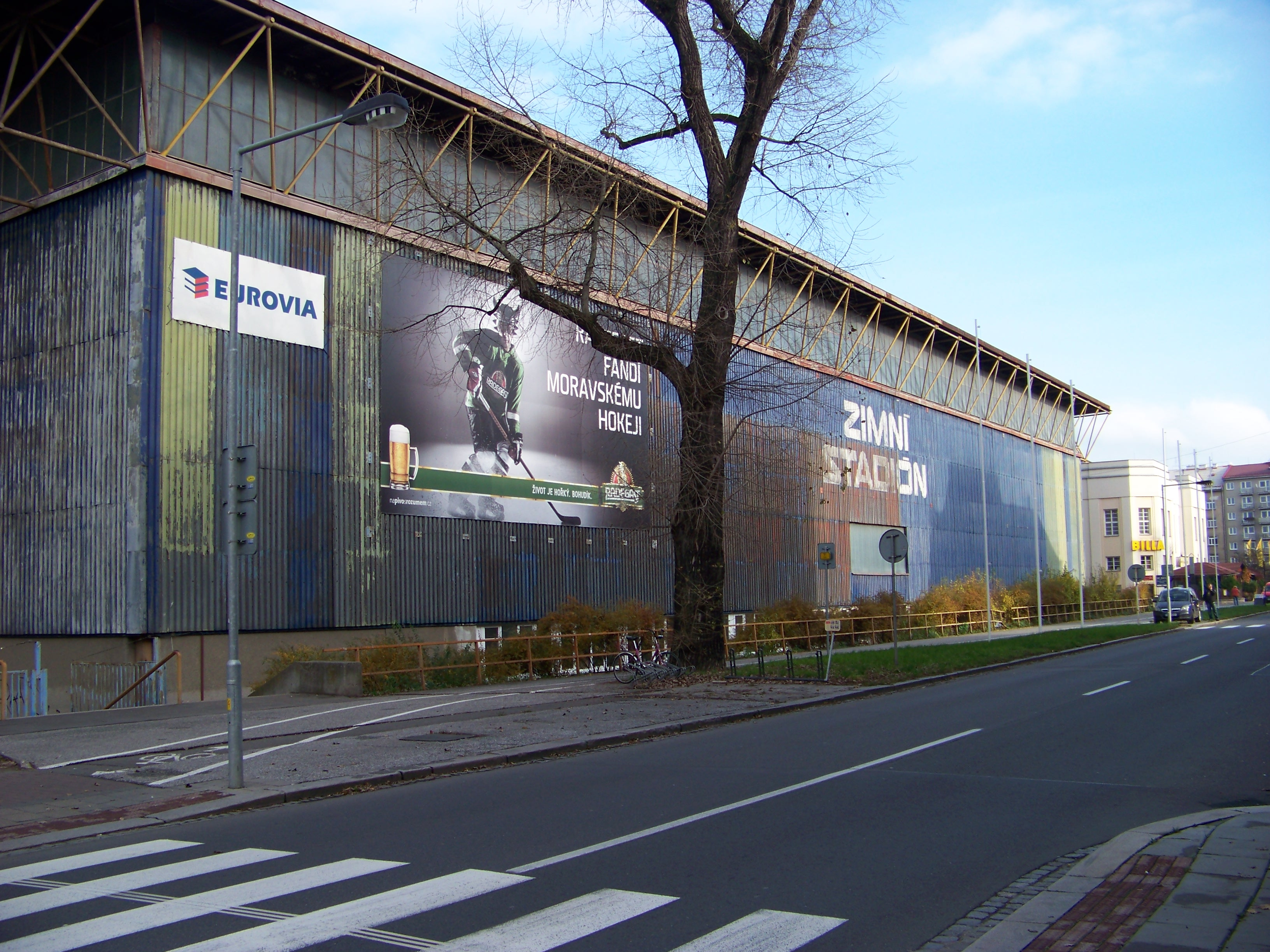
- Interactive map of Zimní stadion Olomouc
- Location: Hynaisova 9a, Olomouc, Czech Republic 772 00
- Coordinates: 49°35′50″N 17°14′38″E
- Owner: Olomouc
- Capacity: 3,800
- Field size: 59.5 m × 29.5 m (195 ft × 97 ft)

Construction
- Opened: 25 January 1948
- Renovated: 1980

Tenant
- HC Olomouc (Czech Extraliga)

The Zimní stadion Olomouc is an indoor sporting arena located in Olomouc, Czech Republic. It is currently home to the HC Olomouc ice hockey team. The capacity of the arena is 5,500 people (out of which 3,800 seating) and it was built in 1948 and roofed in 1967.
