= 2015 CS Tallinn Trophy =

Figure skating competition

2015 Tallinn Trophy
- Type: ISU Challenger Series
- Date: 18 – 22 November 2015
- Season: 2015–16
- Location: Tallinn, Estonia

Champions
- Men's singles: (United States) Max Aaron
- Ladies' singles: (Russia) Maria Sotskova
- Pairs: (Germany) Aliona Savchenko / Bruno Massot
- Ice dance: (Israel) Isabella Tobias / Ilia Tkachenko
- Next: 2016 CS Tallinn Trophy

The 2015 Tallinn Trophy was an international figure skating competition held in November 2015 at the Tondiraba Ice Hall in Tallinn, Estonia. Its senior-level event was part of the 2015–16 ISU Challenger Series. Medals were awarded in the disciplines of men's singles, ladies' singles, pair skating, and ice dancing.

== Entries ==
The preliminary entries were published on 22 October 2015.

Country	Men	Ladies	Pairs	Ice dancing
Armenia	Slavik Hayrapetyan			
Belarus	Pavel Ignatenko			
Croatia			Lana Petranović / Michael Lueck	
Czech Republic		Eliška Březinová; Elizaveta Ukolova		
Estonia		Johanna Allik; Helery Hälvin		Marina Elias / Denis Koreline
Finland	Tino Olenius; Juho Pirinen	Hanna Kiviniemi; Viveca Lindfors		Cecilia Törn / Jussiville Partanen
France	Kevin Aymoz			Lorenza Alessandrini / Pierre Souquet
Germany	Paul Fentz	Lutricia Bock; Nicole Schott; Nathalie Weinzierl	Aliona Savchenko / Bruno Massot; Mari Vartmann / Ruben Blommaert; Minerva Fabienne Hase / Nolan Seegert	Aurelia Ippolito / Bennet Preiss; Katharina Müller / Tim Dieck
Israel				Isabella Tobias / Ilia Tkachenko
Italy	Maurizio Zandron		Alexandra Iovanna / Filippo Ambrosini	Victoria Manni / Saverio Giacomelli
Kazakhstan		Elizabet Tursynbayeva		Karina Uzurova / Aaron Chapplain
Latvia	Deniss Vasiļjevs	Angelīna Kučvaļska		Olga Jakushina / Andrey Nevskiy
Lithuania		Aleksandra Golovkina; Deimantė Kizalaitė; Elžbieta Kropa	Goda Butkutė / Nikita Ermolaev	
Luxembourg		Fleur Maxwell		
Norway	Sondre Oddvoll Bøe	Juni Marie Benjaminsen; Camilla Gjersem		
Poland	Łukasz Kędzierski			
Russia	Dmitri Aliev; Artem Lezheev	Maria Gorokhova; Maria Sotskova	Bogdana Lukashevich / Alexander Stepanov	
Slovakia				Federica Testa / Lukáš Csölley
South Korea		Choi Da-bin		
Switzerland		Matilde Gianocca		Katarina Paice / Yuri Eremenko
Ukraine	Ivan Pavlov			Valeria Haistruk / Oleksiy Oliynyk; Alexandra Nazarova / Maxim Nikitin
United Kingdom			Amani Fancy / Christopher Boyadji	
United States	Max Aaron	Tyler Pierce	Madeline Aaron / Max Settlage	Anastasia Cannuscio / Colin McManus

== Results: Challenger Series ==
=== Medal summary ===
Discipline	Gold	Silver	Bronze
Men	(United States) Max Aaron	(Russia) Dmitri Aliev	(Latvia) Deniss Vasiļjevs
Ladies	(Russia) Maria Sotskova	(Kazakhstan) Elizabet Tursynbayeva	(United States) Tyler Pierce
Pairs	(Germany) Aliona Savchenko / Bruno Massot	(Germany) Mari Vartmann / Ruben Blommaert	(United Kingdom) Amani Fancy / Christopher Boyadji
Ice dancing	(Israel) Isabella Tobias / Ilia Tkachenko	(Slovakia) Federica Testa / Lukáš Csölley	(Finland) Cecilia Törn / Jussiville Partanen

=== Men ===
Rank	Name	Nation	Total	SP		FS	
1	Max Aaron	United States	252.16	1	87.03	1	165.13
2	Dmitri Aliev	Russia	226.72	4	71.12	2	155.60
3	Deniss Vasiļjevs	Latvia	208.53	2	78.63	5	129.90
4	Artem Lezheev	Russia	205.11	3	71.73	4	133.38
5	Ivan Pavlov	Ukraine	202.32	5	67.43	4	133.38
6	Pavel Ignatenko	Belarus	191.08	8	61.34	6	129.74
7	Kevin Aymoz	France	179.06	6	67.18	9	111.88
8	Sondre Oddvoll Bøe	Norway	176.55	9	58.33	8	118.22
9	Maurizio Zandron	Italy	167.47	13	48.64	7	118.83
10	Paul Fentz	Germany	166.84	7	62.32	13	104.52
11	Łukasz Kędzierski	Poland	164.19	11	54.08	10	110.11
12	Tino Olenius	Finland	162.47	10	54.15	11	108.32
13	Slavik Hayrapetyan	Armenia	150.87	14	45.40	12	105.48
14	Juho Pirinen	Finland	147.93	12	51.79	14	96.14
WD	Iassen Petkov	Bulgaria					

=== Ladies ===
Rank	Name	Nation	Total	SP		FS	
1	Maria Sotskova	Russia	186.30	1	64.82	1	121.48
2	Elizabet Tursynbayeva	Kazakhstan	174.87	3	57.48	2	117.39
3	Tyler Pierce	United States	171.72	2	62.57	4	109.15
4	Viveca Lindfors	Finland	157.06	8	47.09	3	109.97
5	Angelīna Kučvaļska	Latvia	156.12	4	52.86	6	103.26
6	Nathalie Weinzierl	Germany	150.75	7	47.29	5	103.46
7	Lutricia Bock	Germany	146.16	6	51.44	10	94.72
8	Choi Da-bin	South Korea	145.92	13	43.74	7	102.18
9	Nicole Schott	Germany	144.30	5	51.72	11	92.58
10	Elizaveta Ukolova	Czech Republic	140.85	10	45.11	9	95.74
11	Eliška Březinová	Czech Republic	136.76	17	40.91	8	95.85
12	Juni Marie Benjaminsen	Norway	128.74	9	45.24	13	83.50
13	Aleksandra Golovkina	Lithuania	124.65	14	43.39	14	81.26
14	Camilla Gjersem	Norway	124.22	15	43.04	15	81.18
15	Helery Hälvin	Estonia	123.91	18	39.46	12	84.45
16	Hanna Kiviniemi	Finland	118.92	11	44.15	17	74.77
17	Johanna Allik	Estonia	112.71	19	38.31	18	74.40
18	Fleur Maxwell	Luxembourg	111.05	20	35.64	16	75.41
19	Maria Gorokhova	Russia	109.54	12	44.00	19	65.54
20	Elžbieta Kropa	Lithuania	104.95	16	42.21	20	62.74
21	Matilde Gianocca	Switzerland	96.79	21	34.91	21	61.88
22	Deimantė Kizalaitė	Lithuania	89.10	22	34.71	22	54.39
WD	Milena Danielyan	Armenia					
WD	Jenni Saarinen	Finland					

=== Pairs ===
Rank	Name	Nation	Total	SP		FS	
1	Aliona Savchenko / Bruno Massot	Germany	214.42	1	71.44	1	142.98
2	Mari Vartmann / Ruben Blommaert	Germany	177.04	2	61.62	2	115.75
3	Amani Fancy / Christopher Boyadji	United Kingdom	156.72	3	53.94	3	102.78
4	Goda Butkutė / Nikita Ermolaev	Lithuania	147.08	6	47.04	4	100.04
5	Madeline Aaron / Max Settlage	United States	143.48	5	50.76	5	93.02
6	Minerva Fabienne Hase / Nolan Seegert	Germany	138.22	4	50.76	7	87.46
7	Bogdana Lukashevich / Alexander Stepanov	Russia	135.62	7	43.66	6	91.96
8	Alexandra Iovanna / Filippo Ambrosini	Italy	106.92	8	33.74	9	73.18
9	Lana Petranović / Michael Lueck	Croatia	106.26	9	28.86	8	77.40

=== Ice dancing ===
Rank	Name	Nation	Total	SD		FD	
1	Isabella Tobias / Ilia Tkachenko	Israel	160.84	1	61.90	1	98.94
2	Federica Testa / Lukáš Csölley	Slovakia	149.56	2	56.28	2	93.28
3	Cecilia Törn / Jussiville Partanen	Finland	142.90	5	53.06	3	89.84
4	Anastasia Cannuscio / Colin McManus	United States	130.46	3	54.26	9	76.20
5	Katharina Müller / Tim Dieck	Germany	128.82	7	47.26	4	81.56
6	Alexandra Nazarova / Maxim Nikitin	Ukraine	127.84	4	53.82	10	74.02
7	Victoria Manni / Saverio Giacomelli	Italy	127.20	6	48.76	6	78.44
8	Lorenza Alessandrini / Pierre Souquet	France	125.46	8	47.18	7	78.28
9	Valeria Haistruk / Oleksiy Oliynyk	Ukraine	125.30	9	45.36	5	79.94
10	Olga Jakushina / Andrey Nevskiy	Latvia	119.58	10	42.94	8	76.64
11	Karina Uzurova / Aaron Chapplain	Kazakhstan	105.26	11	42.10	12	63.16
12	Marina Elias / Denis Koreline	Estonia	97.74	13	34.54	11	63.20
13	Aurelia Ippolito / Bennet Preiss	Germany	91.14	14	32.04	13	59.10
14	Katarina Paice / Yuri Eremenko	Switzerland	88.80	12	35.20	14	53.60

== Results: Junior and advanced novice ==
=== Medal summary: Junior ===
Discipline	Gold	Silver	Bronze
Men	(Russia) Dmitry Bushlanov	(Russia) Igor Efimchuk	(Estonia) Daniil Zurav
Ladies Group I	(Switzerland) Shaline Ruegger	(Israel) Ella Mizrahi	(France) Serena Giraud
Ladies Group II	(Russia) Stanislava Konstantinova	(Russia) Alisa Fedichkina	(Latvia) Diana Nikitina
Ice dancing	(Russia) Aleksandra Amelkina / Andrey Filatov	(Russia) Ksenia Konkina / Georgy Reviya	(France) Sarah Marine Rouffanche / Geoffrey Brissaud

=== Medal summary: Advanced novice ===
Discipline	Gold	Silver	Bronze
Men	(Russia) Egor Rukhin	(Sweden) Andreas Nordebäck	(Germany) Jegor Eschlinger
Ladies	(Bulgaria) Alexandra Feigin	(Russia) Alexandra Trusova	(Russia) Diana Guseva
Ice dancing	(Russia) Irina Khavronina / Nikita Tashirev	(Russia) Ekaterina Kuznetsova / Dimitrii Parkhomenko	(Russia) Angelina Zimina / Egor Goncharov
