= Bogdana Lukashevich =

Russian-Belarusian pair skater

Personal information
- Native name: Богдана Валерьевна Лукашевич (Russian)
- Full name: Bogdana Valeriyevna Lukashevich
- Born: 6 July 1996 (age 30) Naberezhnye Chelny, Russia
- Height: 1.56 m (5 ft 1 1/2 in)

Figure skating career
- Country: Belarus
- Partner: Alexander Stepanov
- Coach: Mikalai Kamianchuk; Oleg Vasiliev

Bogdana Valeriyevna Lukashevich (Russian: Богдана Валерьевна Лукашевич; born 6 July 1996) is a Russian-born pair skater who competes for Belarus. With her skating partner, Alexander Stepanov, she is the 2020 Ice Star champion, the 2020 Winter Star champion, and the 2021 Belarusian national champion. They competed in the final segment at the 2021 World Championships.

Lukashevich/Stepanov represented Russia until switching to Belarus in June 2020.

== Programs ==
With Stepanov

Season	Short program	Free skating
2020–2022	The Man in the Iron Mask by Nick Glennie-Smith choreo. by Elizaveta Anikhimuskaia	Pirates of the Caribbean by Hans Zimmer choreo. by Elizaveta Anikhimuskaia

== Competitive highlights ==
CS: Challenger Series

=== With Stepanov ===
For Belarus

International
Event	20–21	21–22	22–23
Worlds	18th		
Europeans		10th	
CS Finlandia Trophy		10th	
CS Nebelhorn Trophy		7th	
CS Warsaw Cup		WD	
Ice Star	1st	2nd	
Winter Star	1st	1st	
National
Belarusian Champ.	1st		1st
TBD = Assigned; WD = Withdrew; C = Cancelled

For Russia

International
Event	15–16	16–17	17–18
CS Golden Spin		9th	
CS Tallinn Trophy	7th		
Cup of Nice		4th	7th
National
Russian Champ.		11th	12th

=== Ladies' singles for Russia ===
International: Junior
Event	2013–14
Denkova-Staviski Cup	2nd

== Detailed results ==
ISU Personal Best highlighted in bold.

With Stepanov

=== For Belarus ===
2021–22 season
Date	Event	SP	FS	Total
10–16 January 2022	2022 European Championships	9; 58.80	12; 102.96	10; 161.76
7–10 October 2021	2021 CS Finlandia Trophy	14; 43.88	9; 96.96	10; 140.84
22–25 September 2021	2021 CS Nebelhorn Trophy	6; **58.25**	7; **100.83**	7; **159.08**
**2020–21 season**
Date	Event	SP	FS	Total
22–28 March 2021	2021 World Championships	20; 46.20	17; 99.35	18; 145.55
11–13 December 2020	2020 Winter Star / 2021 Belarusian Championships	1; 55.25	1; 102.70	1; 157.95
29 Oct. – 1 Nov.. 2020	2020 Ice Star	1; 54.60	1; 103.36	1; 157.96

=== For Russia ===
**2017–18 season**
Date	Event	SP	FS	Total
21–24 December 2017	2018 Russian Championships	12; 52.34	12; 92.39	12; 144.73
11–15 October 2017	2017 Cup of Nice	3; 53.44	7; 88.33	7; 141.77
**2016–17 season**
Date	Event	SP	FS	Total
20–25 December 2016	2017 Russian Championships	11; 52.88	11; 94.00	11; 146.88
7–10 December 2016	2016 CS Golden Spin of Zagreb	6; 53.04	9; 83.09	9; 136.13
20–23 October 2016	2016 Cup of Nice	5; 47.58	4; 89.08	4; 136.66
**2015–16 season**
Date	Event	SP	FS	Total
17–22 November 2015	2015 CS Tallinn Trophy	7; 43.66	6; 91.96	7; 135.62
