= Ivan Pavlov (figure skater) =

Ukrainian former pairs skater (born 1998)

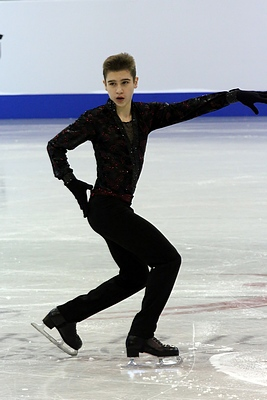
- Pavlov in 2014

Personal information
- Native name: Іван Володимирович Павлов
- Full name: Ivan Volodymyrovich Pavlov
- Born: 26 September 1998 (age 28) Kyiv, Ukraine
- Home town: Kyiv
- Height: 1.80 m (5 ft 11 in)

Figure skating career
- Country: Ukraine
- Coach: Yuri Rudyk, Arina Kuznetsova
- Skating club: Leader Kyiv
- Began skating: 2003
- Retired: 2 January 2021
Medal record
Representing Ukraine
Figure skating: Men's singles
European Youth Olympic Festival
Gold medal – first place	2015 Dornbirn	Men's singles

Ivan Volodymyrovych Pavlov (Ukrainian: Іван Володимирович Павлов, born 26 September 1998) is a Ukrainian former pairs skater. With his partner, Kateryna Dzitsiuk, he is the 2020 Ukrainian national champion. As a single skater, he is the 2015 European Youth Olympic champion, 2014 NRW Trophy silver medalist, and a two-time Ukrainian national champion. He has competed in the final segment at seven ISU Championships and finished within the top eight at the 2018 World Junior Championships.

== Career ==
=== Early years ===
Pavlov began learning to skate in 2003. He competed on the novice level in the 2010–2011 and 2011–2012 seasons.

=== 2012–2013 season ===
Coached by Maryna Amirkhanova, Pavlov debuted on the ISU Junior Grand Prix (JGP) series. He placed eighth at his JGP assignments in France and Turkey and then won junior titles at the Bavarian Open and Ukrainian Junior Championships. Ukraine selected him to compete at the 2013 World Junior Championships in Milan, Italy; he would qualify to the free skate and finish 20th overall.

=== 2013–2014 season ===
Pavlov finished eighth and seventh respectively at his JGP assignments in Slovakia and Estonia. After taking the junior silver medal at the 2013 Cup of Nice, he became the Ukrainian national senior bronze medalist. Pavlov was assigned to his second World Junior Championships. He ranked 16th in both segments and finished 15th overall.

=== 2014–2015 season ===
During the 2014 JGP series, Pavlov placed seventh in Tallinn, Estonia and fifth in Zagreb, Croatia. Making his senior international debut, he won the silver medal at the NRW Trophy in late November 2014. At the Ukrainian Championships, he ranked first in the short program and second in the free skate, finishing second to Yaroslav Paniot by less than half a point.

In January 2015, Pavlov won gold at the European Youth Olympic Winter Festival in Dornbirn, Austria. In March, he came in 16th at the 2015 World Junior Championships in Tallinn, having placed 21st in the short and 15th in the free. He was coached by Amirkhanova until the end of the season.

=== 2015–2016 season ===
Dmytro Shkidchenko began coaching Pavlov in the 2015–2016 season. Starting his season on the JGP series, Pavlov finished 8th in Bratislava, Slovakia, before winning a bronze medal in Linz, Austria. He then appeared on the senior level, placing 7th at the International Cup of Nice and 5th at his first ISU Challenger Series (CS) event, the 2015 Tallinn Trophy. In December 2015, he placed first in both segments at the Ukrainian Championships and outscored Paniot for the gold medal by 7.42 points.

Pavlov made his senior ISU Championship debut in January 2016 at the European Championships in Bratislava, Slovakia. He qualified for the final segment by placing 13th in the short program and then placed 15th in the free, resulting in a final placement of 15th. Ranked 24th in the short, he also reached the free skate at the 2016 World Championships in Boston.

=== 2016–2017 season ===
Competing in the 2016 JGP series, Pavlov placed 4th in Ostrava and 7th in Ljubljana. In the senior ranks, he took gold at Ice Star and finished 7th at the International Cup of Nice. At the Ukrainian Championships, he placed second in the short and first in the free, winning gold by a margin of 0.87 over Paniot. Pavlov was assigned to two senior-level ISU Championships and qualified to the final segment at the first, the 2017 European Championships in Ostrava, Czech Republic; he placed 15th in the short program, 14th in the free skate, and 14th overall. At the 2017 World Championships in Helsinki, Finland, he placed 25th in the short program, scoring 0.06 less than the final skater who qualified to the free skate. He trained with Shkidchenko until the end of the season.

=== 2017–2018 season ===
During the 2017–2018 season, Pavlov was coached by Amirkhanova. In December, he finished second to Paniot at the Ukrainian Championships. In March, he competed at the 2018 World Junior Championships in Sofia, Bulgaria; he placed fourth in the short program, eighth in the free skate with a personal best score, and eighth overall. His placement allows Ukraine to send two entries to the next edition of the event.

Pavlov finished 29th at the 2018 World Championships in Milan, Italy.

=== 2018–2019 season: pair skating ===
On 28 May 2018, the Ukrainian Figure Skating Federation announced that he had teamed up with Sofiya Holichenko to compete in pair skating and that the two would be coached by Halyna Kukhar.

=== 2019–2020 season ===
Pavlov teamed up with Kateryna Dzitsiuk prior to the season. On the Junior Grand Prix, they placed seventh in Poland and Croatia. At the 2020 Ukrainian Championships, Dzitsiuk/Pavlov won the senior national title ahead of Victoria Bychkova / Ivan Khobta and Sofiia Nesterova / Artem Darenskyi, but Dzitsiuk was too young to be assigned to senior events. They instead were sent to the 2020 World Junior Championships, where they finished 12th.

After the World Junior Championships, the Ukrainian Figure Skating Federation announced the suspension of Dzitsiuk/Pavlov, as well as their mothers, Alla Dzitsiuk and Alla Pavlova, due to "gross violation of discipline at the World Junior Championships." As a result, they were no longer allowed to represent Ukraine at international events, receive funding from the federation, or train at national team rinks.

Dzitsiuk/Pavlov originally wanted to keep skating together under a different federation, but were also open to separating and representing different countries. However, the onset of the COVID-19 pandemic limited opportunities for try outs and negotiations.

Pavlov announced his retirement on 2 January 2021. He plans to work as a skating coach.

== Programs ==
Season	Short program	Free skating
2017–2018	Mr. & Mrs. Smith by John Powell	Blood Diamond by James Newton Howard
2016–2017	Bad Boys by Mark Mancina	Blood Diamond by James Newton Howard
2015–2016	Pardon by Johnny Hallyday	Angels & Demons by Hans Zimmer
2014–2015	Danse macabre by Camille Saint-Saëns	La Leyenda del Beso by Raúl Di Blasio
2013–2014	El Tango de Roxanne (from Moulin Rouge!)	La Leyenda del Beso by Raúl Di Blasio
2012–2013	Symphony No. 5 by Ludwig van Beethoven arranged by David Garrett	The Legend of Zorro by James Horner

== Competitive highlights ==
CS: Challenger Series; JGP: Junior Grand Prix

=== Pair skating with Dzitsiuk ===
International: Junior
Event	2019–20
Junior Worlds	12th
JGP JGP Croatia	7th
JGP JGP Poland	7th
National
Ukraine	1st
Ukraine Junior	1st

=== Pair skating with Holichenko ===
International: Junior
Event	2018–19
Volvo Open Cup	3rd
Minsk-Arena Ice Star	6th
National
Ukraine Junior	3rd

=== Men's singles ===
International
Event	12–13	13–14	14–15	15–16	16–17	17–18
Worlds				23rd	25th	29th
Europeans				15th	14th	
CS Ice Star						7th
CS Ondrej Nepela						9th
CS Tallinn Trophy				5th		
Universiade					15th	
Cup of Nice				7th	7th	
Ice Star					1st	
NRW Trophy			2nd			
International: Junior or novice
Junior Worlds	20th	15th	16th			8th
JGP Croatia			5th			
JGP Czech Rep.					4th	
JGP Estonia		7th	7th			
JGP Austria	8th			3rd		
JGP France	8th					
JGP Italy						6th
JGP Latvia						5th
JGP Slovakia		8th		8th		
JGP Slovenia					7th	
JGP Turkey	8th					
EYOF			1st			
Bavarian Open	1st J					
Cup of Nice	4th J	2nd J				
Ice Star	1st J					
National
Ukraine		3rd	2nd	1st	1st	2nd
Ukraine Junior	1st		1st			
