= Amani Fancy =

English pair skater

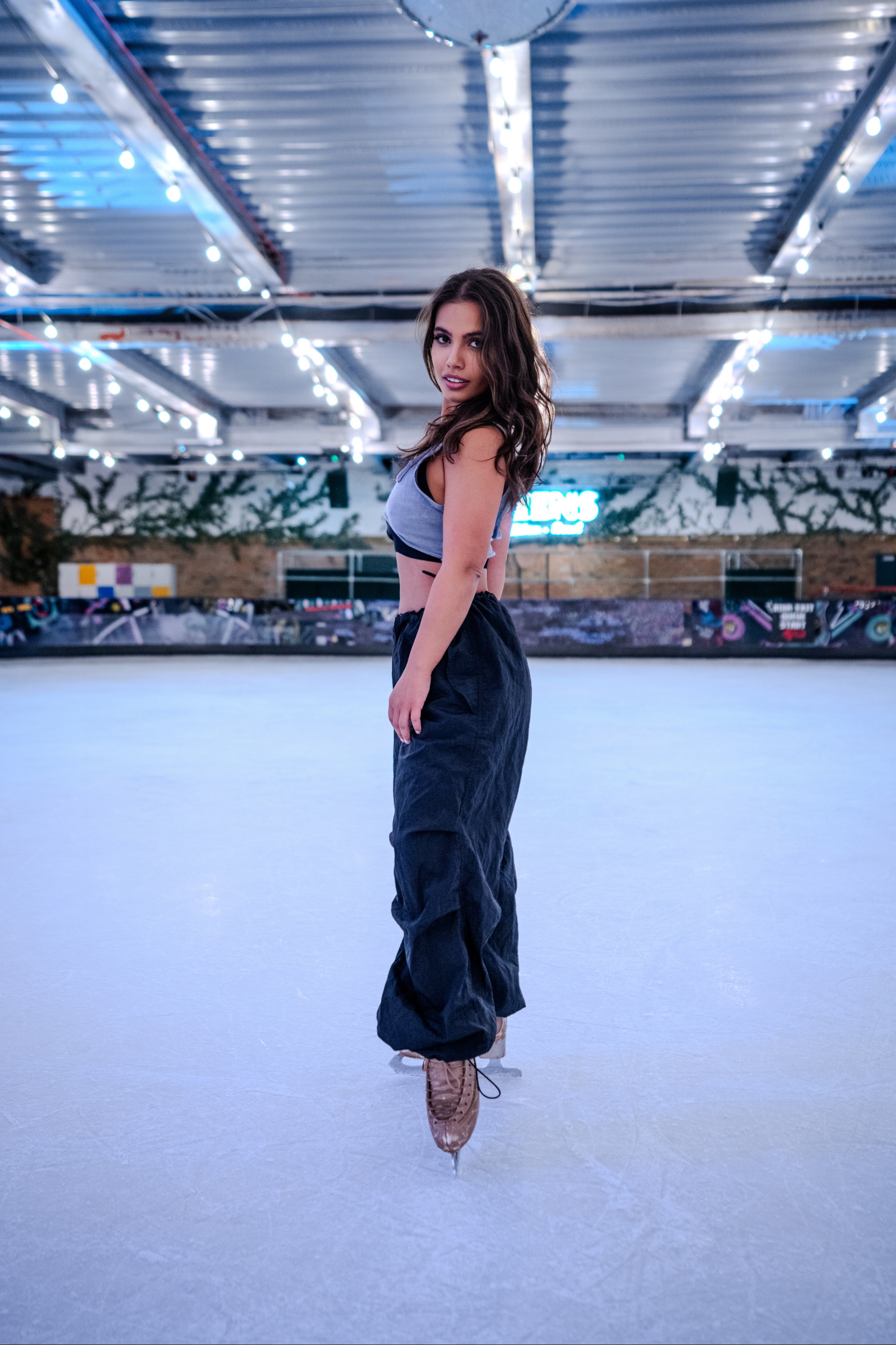
Amani Fancy (2023).

Amani Fancy (born 14 July 1997) is an English pair skater. With former skating partner Christopher Boyadji, she is the 2015 CS Tallinn Trophy bronze medalist and a two-time British national champion (2014 and 2016). After that she was a pro ice-skater on the German version of Dancing On Ice in 2019, before joining the British version in 2024. She studied at Royal Holloway, University of London (2016–2020).

== Personal life ==
Amani Fancy was born on 14 July 1997 in London, England. She lived in Oman as a child.

== Career ==
=== Single skating ===
Fancy began learning to skate as an eight-year-old at a small ice rink in Oman. She competed in ladies' singles until the end of the 2012–13 season. She won the junior bronze medal at two consecutive British Championships and was sent to the 2013 World Junior Championships, where she placed 41st. She was coached by Igor Novodran in Oberstdorf, Germany.

=== Pair skating ===
In spring 2013, Fancy teamed up with Christopher Boyadji to compete in pair skating. In November 2013, the pair won the British national title ahead of defending champions Stacey Kemp / David King. Fancy/Boyadji placed 15th at the 2014 European Championships in Budapest, Hungary, and 18th at the 2014 World Championships in Saitama, Japan.

Following an elbow surgery in November 2014, they were unable to compete at the 2015 British Championships. They were sent to the 2015 European Championships in Stockholm, where they placed 12th. The pair finished 16th at the 2015 World Championships in Shanghai.

Fancy/Boyadji won the bronze medal at the 2015 CS Tallinn Trophy and placed 8th at a Grand Prix event, the 2015 NHK Trophy, as well as winning their second national title. In January 2016, they withdrew from the 2016 European Championships and announced the end of their partnership. They were coached by Alexander König and Mark Naylor in Oberstdorf, Germany.

== Programs ==
=== With Boyadji ===
Season	Short program	Free skating
2015–16	La Vie en rose by Louis Armstrong	Ghost the Musical by Dave A. Stewart
2014–15	La Vie en rose by Louis Armstrong	Harry Potter by John Williams
2013–14	Concierto de Aranjuez by Joaquín Rodrigo performed by André Rieu; Red Violin (based on Aranjuez) by Ikuko Kawai	Adiós Nonino by Astor Piazzolla; Esperanza; El Conquistador by Maxime Rodriguez

=== Ladies' singles ===
Season	Short program	Free skating	Exhibition
2012–13	Pink Panther Remix by The Doors	The Mask of Zorro by James Horner	Cinderella

== Competitive highlights ==
GP: Grand Prix; CS: Challenger Series; JGP: Junior Grand Prix

=== Pairs with Boyadji ===
International
Event	2013–14	2014–15	2015–16
World Champ.	18th	16th	
European Champ.	15th	12th	
GP NHK Trophy			8th
CS Nebelhorn Trophy		8th	WD
CS Tallinn Trophy			3rd
Bavarian Open	4th		
Lombardia Trophy	8th		
Warsaw Cup	4th		
National
British Champ.	1st		1st
WD = Withdrew

=== Ladies' singles ===
International
Event	2008–09	2009–10	2010–11	2011–12	2012–13
World Junior Champ.					41st
JGP Germany					17th
Bavarian Open		3rd N		4th J	
Challenge Cup				7th J	
Crystal Skate of Romania					1st J
Euro. Youth Olympics					15th J
Merano Cup				7th J	
National
British Champ.	2nd N		3rd J	3rd J	4th J
German Champ.		3rd N	3rd J		
Levels: N = Novice; J = Junior
