= Amber Glenn =

American figure skater (born 1999)

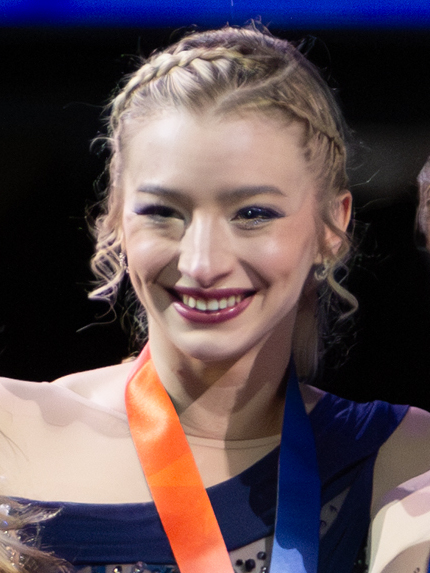
- Glenn at the 2026 U.S. Championships

Personal information
- Born: Amber Elaine Glenn; October 28, 1999 (age 27) Plano, Texas, U.S.
- Height: 5 ft 6 in (1.67 m)

Figure skating career
- Country: United States
- Discipline: Women's singles
- Coach: Damon Allen; Tammy Gambill
- Skating club: Dallas Figure Skating Club
- Began skating: 2004

Medal record
Olympic Games
Gold medal – first place	2026 Milano Cortina	Team
Grand Prix Final
Gold medal – first place	2024–25 Grenoble	Singles
U.S. Championships
Gold medal – first place	2024 Columbus	Singles
Gold medal – first place	2025 Wichita	Singles
Gold medal – first place	2026 St. Louis	Singles
Silver medal – second place	2021 Las Vegas	Singles
Bronze medal – third place	2023 San Jose	Singles
World Team Trophy
Gold medal – first place	2023 Tokyo	Team
Gold medal – first place	2025 Tokyo	Team

Amber Elaine Glenn (born October 28, 1999) is an American figure skater. She is a 2026 Olympic Games team event gold medalist, the 2024–25 Grand Prix Final champion, a three-time U.S. national champion (2024–26), a six-time ISU Grand Prix medalist, and a five-time ISU Challenger Series medalist. She has also finished within the top ten at five ISU Championships.

Early in her career, she won bronze medals at two ISU Junior Grand Prix events (2013 JGP Czech Republic, 2014 JGP France) and was the 2014 U.S. Junior champion. She is the fourth American woman to land a clean triple axel in international competition.

Glenn is the first American woman to win three consecutive U.S. National titles since Michelle Kwan (2003–05). Upon her selection for the 2026 Winter Olympics, she became the first openly queer woman to represent the United States in Olympic figure skating. Additionally, at age 26, she was the oldest American woman to qualify for an Olympic singles team since 1928.

She is also the fifth woman to land a triple Axel at a Winter Olympic Games.

== Career ==
=== Early career ===
Glenn first began skating at the age of five at an ice rink inside the Stonebriar Centre Mall. She was inspired to pursue the sport competitively after watching Sarah Hughes win the gold medal in women's singles at the 2002 Winter Olympics. Her coaches, Ann Brumbaugh and Ben Shroats, described her as a determined, passionate, and athletic skater who at times struggled with perfectionism. Within one year of skating, Glenn had landed the axel jump. By age eleven, Glenn had landed all triple jumps except the axel.

To afford the high costs associated with competitive figure skating, her father, Richard, worked up to 30 hours of overtime per week along with various side jobs, while her mother, Cathlene, worked at the ice rink and served as a nanny for Glenn's coach to receive discounted lessons. The family also reduced costs by purchasing used blades and costumes second-hand through eBay.

Competing in the novice category, Glenn placed second at the 2012 U.S. Championships behind Karen Chen. The next year, Glenn competed at the junior level, placing seventh in the short program and sixth in the free skate for an overall fifth place finish.

=== 2013–14 season: First Junior Grand Prix medal and National junior champion ===
At the 2013 ISU Junior Grand Prix in the Czech Republic, Glenn made her junior international debut. Glenn finished third overall, winning the bronze medal.

Glenn qualified for the 2014 U.S. Championships after winning the 2014 Midwestern Sectional Championships title at the junior level. At the U.S. Championships, Glenn placed first in both segments of the competition to win the national title. Her total score of 186.51 was, at the time, the highest ever recorded for a junior lady at the U.S. Championships under the ISU Judging System.

Glenn later noted that the expectations following her title win contributed to subsequent challenges with her mental health. This pressure was intensified by the success of the junior champions from the prior two years, Gracie Gold and Polina Edmunds, both of whom had successfully transitioned from their junior success to the 2014 Olympic team.

Ranked fifth in the short program and eighth in the free skate, she finished seventh at the 2014 World Junior Championships in Sofia, Bulgaria.

=== 2014–15 season: Second Junior Grand Prix medal ===
In May 2014, U.S. Figure Skating named Glenn as the recipient of the 2014 Athlete Alumni Ambassador (3A) overall award. In August, she won bronze at the 2014 JGP in France. She finished sixth at her second JGP assignment in Estonia and thirteenth on the senior level at the 2015 U.S. Championships.

=== 2015–16 season: Senior international debut and mental health struggles ===
Glenn began the 2015–2016 season training in McKinney, Texas under Ann Brumbaugh and Ben Shroats. At the junior level, she placed fifth at the 2015 JGP Latvia. Afterwards, struggles with depression, an eating disorder, and her sexuality led to Glenn being admitted for inpatient treatment. In a later interview, she said that she was told her sexuality was unimportant instead of being offered help with understanding it, something she found hurtful. With her first international senior assignment at the 2015 Autumn Classic International pending, she decided to leave the facility to attend. She would later describe the event as a "disaster" that she had no memory of beyond her sixth-place finish.

Glenn announced that she would take a break to "reevaluate". In a 2024 profile in The Washington Post, she revealed that her psychiatrist had told her to stop skating indefinitely. She resumed training in February 2016 after joining Peter Cain and Darlene Cain in Euless, which is situated halfway between Dallas and Fort Worth, Texas. One of her training mates there was non-binary skater Timothy LeDuc, who Glenn credited with helping her to accept her sexuality and identity.

=== 2016–17 season ===
Glenn placed fifth at the 2016 CS Nebelhorn Trophy, fourth at the 2016 CS Golden Spin of Zagreb, and eighth at the 2017 U.S. Championships. She was selected to compete at the 2017 World Junior Championships but withdrew in early March due to "personal reasons."

=== 2017–18 season ===
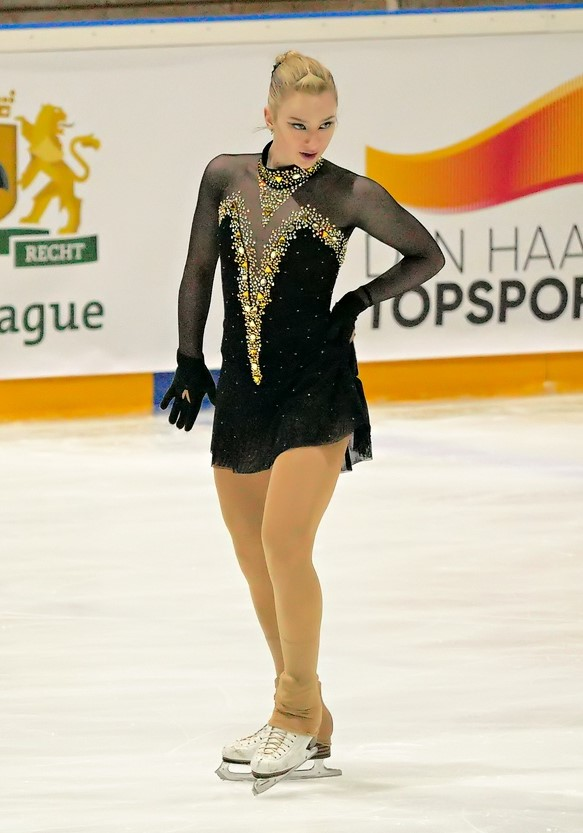
Glenn during her free skate at the 2019 Challenge Cup

Glenn finished eighth at the 2017 CS Lombardia Trophy. She was invited to compete at her first Grand Prix event, the 2017 Cup of China, after the withdrawal of Gracie Gold. She placed tenth in China and finished the season with a second consecutive eighth-place at the 2018 U.S. Championships.

=== 2018–19 season ===
Glenn was sixth at the 2018 CS Lombardia Trophy and seventh at the 2019 U.S. Championships. She would finish the season with a fourth-place finish at the 2019 Challenge Cup.

=== 2019–20 season: First senior international medal ===
At the start of the 2019–20 season, Glenn competed on the ISU Challenger Series, winning the bronze medal at the 2019 CS U.S. Classic. This marked her first senior international medal.

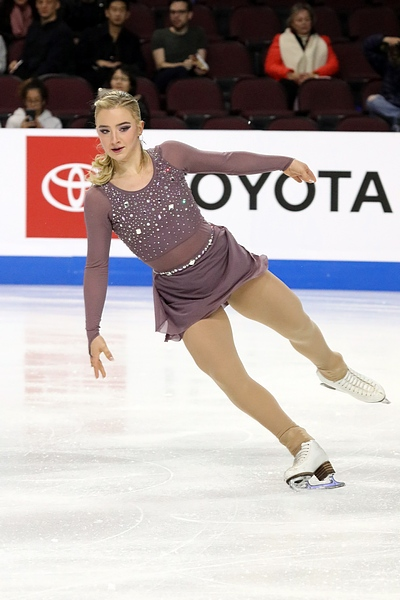
Glenn during her short program at 2019 Skate America

Glenn was selected as the host pick for 2019 Skate America, where she placed seventh. She was later added to the 2019 Cup of China following the withdrawal of Viveca Lindfors, finishing sixth overall after placing third in the short program. These events marked the first time Glenn competed in two Grand Prix assignments in a single season.

At the 2020 U.S. Championships, Glenn placed fourth in the short program with a clean performance. Reflecting on her decision to come out as pansexual the previous month, she noted that the openness "brought a weight off my shoulders," adding that she no longer had to "pretend I'm someone I'm not anymore." She dropped to fifth place overall after placing ninth in the free skate and stated that she needed to continue focusing on her "mental toughness." Her result earned her an assignment to the 2020 Four Continents Championships, her first senior ISU championship. There, Glenn finished in ninth place and set a new personal best total score of 190.83.

=== 2020–21 season: First senior national medal and triple axel attempts ===
The coronavirus pandemic prompted a multi-month hiatus from training, after which Glenn began working on mastering the triple Axel, which she had been attempting "for fun" periodically for nine years by that point. She missed an early virtual competition due to fracturing her orbital bone and sustaining a severe concussion after passing out during cryotherapy but then attempted the triple Axel for the first time in competition during a later virtual domestic event, though she singled it. With the pandemic restricting international travel, the ISU opted to conduct Grand Prix assignments based mainly on training location. Glenn was assigned to compete at the 2020 Skate America. She placed fifth in the Skate America short program after having to execute a turn in between her triple-triple jump combination. She was sixth in the free skate and remained in fifth place overall.

Glenn attempted her triple Axel in the short program at the 2021 U.S. Championships but was unable to land it successfully. Her otherwise strong performances earned her her highest-ever placement at the event and first senior national medal, a silver. She expressed that she was "happy to finally put out a performance I'm proud of." Glenn revealed that she had been suffering from a foot infection that had spread up to the knee and had begun a course of antibiotics on the day of the free skate.

Despite her silver medal, U.S. Figure Skating opted to name bronze medalist Karen Chen, who had finished 0.35 points behind Glenn, alongside champion Bradie Tennell to the 2021 World Championships team. It was the first time since 2008, when Katrina Hacker was bypassed in favor of Kimmie Meissner, that the selected ladies team in a non-Olympic year did not follow Nationals placements (for age-eligible skaters). Instead Glenn was named first alternate. She had previously said when asked about the prospect of the World team, "US Figure Skating should go with a team that they know will go and get those three spots back. Whether that includes me or not, I'm all for it either way."

=== 2021–22 season ===
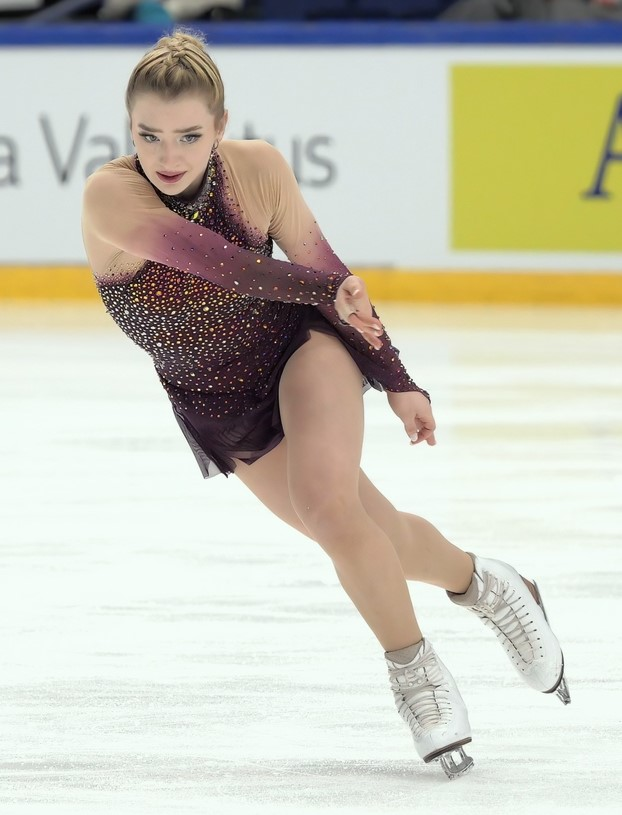
Glenn performing her short program at the 2021 CS Finlandia Trophy

After withdrawing from the 2021 Cranberry Cup, Glenn made her full competitive debut at the 2021 CS Finlandia Trophy, where she placed tenth. Beginning the Grand Prix at 2021 Skate America, Glenn did not attempt a triple Axel in competition after practice session difficulties.

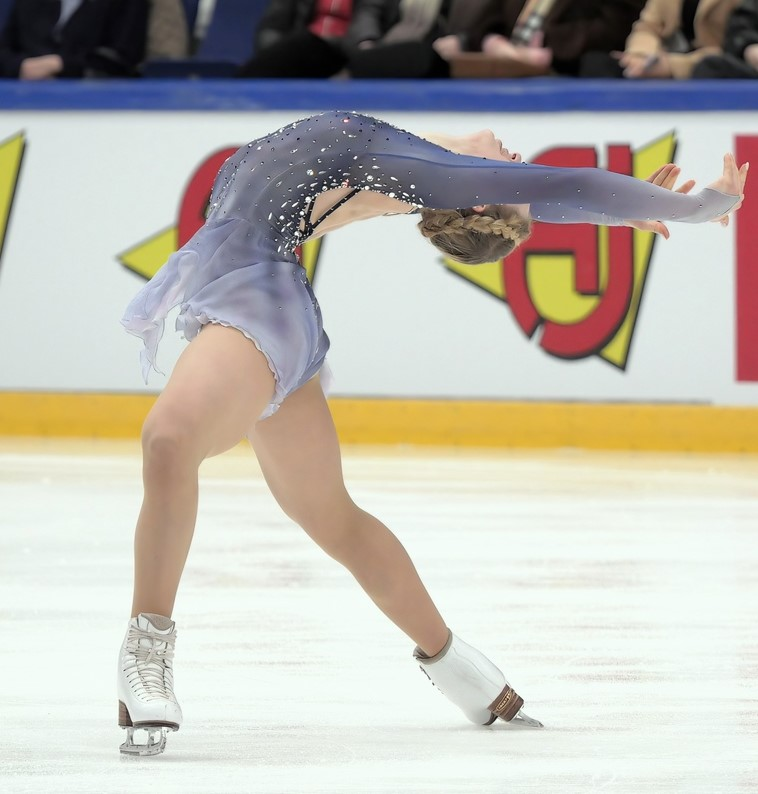
Glenn performing an Ina Bauer during her free skate at the 2021 CS Finlandia Trophy

Seventh in both segments of the competition, she placed sixth overall with a score of 201.02, breaking 200 points internationally for the first time. She went on to finish seventh at the 2021 NHK Trophy.

Glenn concluded the fall season at the 2021 CS Golden Spin of Zagreb, where she won the silver medal. Attempting to qualify for the American Olympic team at the 2022 U.S. Championships in January, Glenn struggled in the short program and finished fourteenth in that segment. She tested positive for COVID-19 afterward and withdrew before the free skate. She was named as an alternate for the Olympic team. Glenn later reflected that while she had not assumed that going to the Olympics was possible for most of her career due to the expectations raised after the previous national championships, "I felt like I was expected to make it, so that made it all the more devastating. It was hard."

=== 2022–23 season: First Grand Prix medal ===
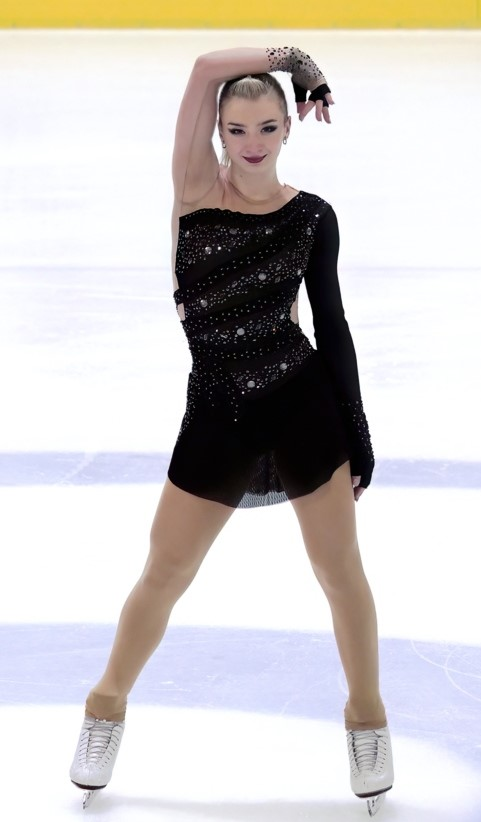
Glenn during the short program at the 2022 CS Lombardia Trophy

Before starting the season, Glenn moved to Colorado Springs, Colorado to train under Damon Allen, Tammy Gambill, and Viktor Pfeifer. She said her departure from the Cains was amicable, reasoning that "I needed to grow, not just as a skater, but as a human. I lived in the same city, the same place, my entire life."

Glenn began the season by winning a bronze medal at the Skating Club of Boston's Cranberry Cup event before finishing fourth at the 2022 CS Lombardia Trophy. On the Grand Prix at 2022 Skate America, she scored a personal best in her short program of 68.42, placing third in that segment and then third in the free skate as well to take the bronze medal. This was her first Grand Prix figure skating medal. On her free skate performance she said afterward "knowing that I didn't feel 100% out there when I was skating and how much room for improvement, the possibilities are endless. It really kind of just blew my mind that I'm finally starting to reach my potential." For the 2022 NHK Trophy, she declared that she was "not playing it as safe" as she had at her first event. The short program in Sapporo, Japan was a struggle; she put a hand down on her jump combination and then fell on and underrotated the final triple loop. She finished eleventh of twelve skaters in the segment. Glenn said, "it's so disheartening to have a skate like that after working so hard." She placed eighth in the free skate but remained eleventh overall.

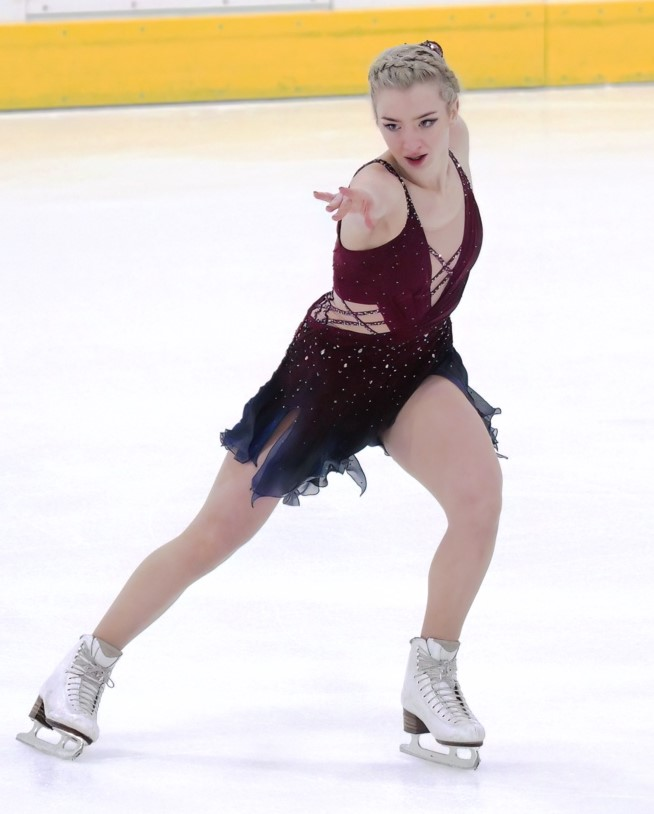
Glenn performing her free skate at the 2022 CS Lombardia Trophy

Glenn described "mixed emotions" approaching the 2023 U.S. Championships after her disappointment the previous year. In the short program, she made an error on her triple loop jump but still placed fourth in the segment. In the free skate, she stepped out of her opening triple axel attempt, but she landed six other clean triples despite doubling one planned triple and singling a planned double Axel. She was third in that segment, rising to win the bronze medal. She said she was happy with how she performed, and that she had enjoyed the experience of the national championships and the crowd support.

Assigned to the 2023 Four Continents Championships, Glenn placed fourth in the short program, 1.76 points behind third-place Kim Chae-yeon of South Korea. Her only error in the performance was putting a hand down on her solo triple loop. Glenn said that she "didn't feel as energetic" as she had wanted to be. Continuing to feel sick, she made two jump errors in the free skate and dropped to seventh overall, but she said that she was glad to have stayed in a "decent mental place."

Glenn competed next at the 2023 World Championships in Saitama, Japan where she finished twelfth despite under-rotating her triple axel attempt in the free skate. She said after "the free skate wasn't what I wanted or what I've been training, but I feel that mentally I held myself together." Glenn then joined Team USA for the 2023 World Team Trophy in Tokyo, finishing sixth in both her segments of the competition. Team USA won the gold medal.

=== 2023–24 season: First national title ===
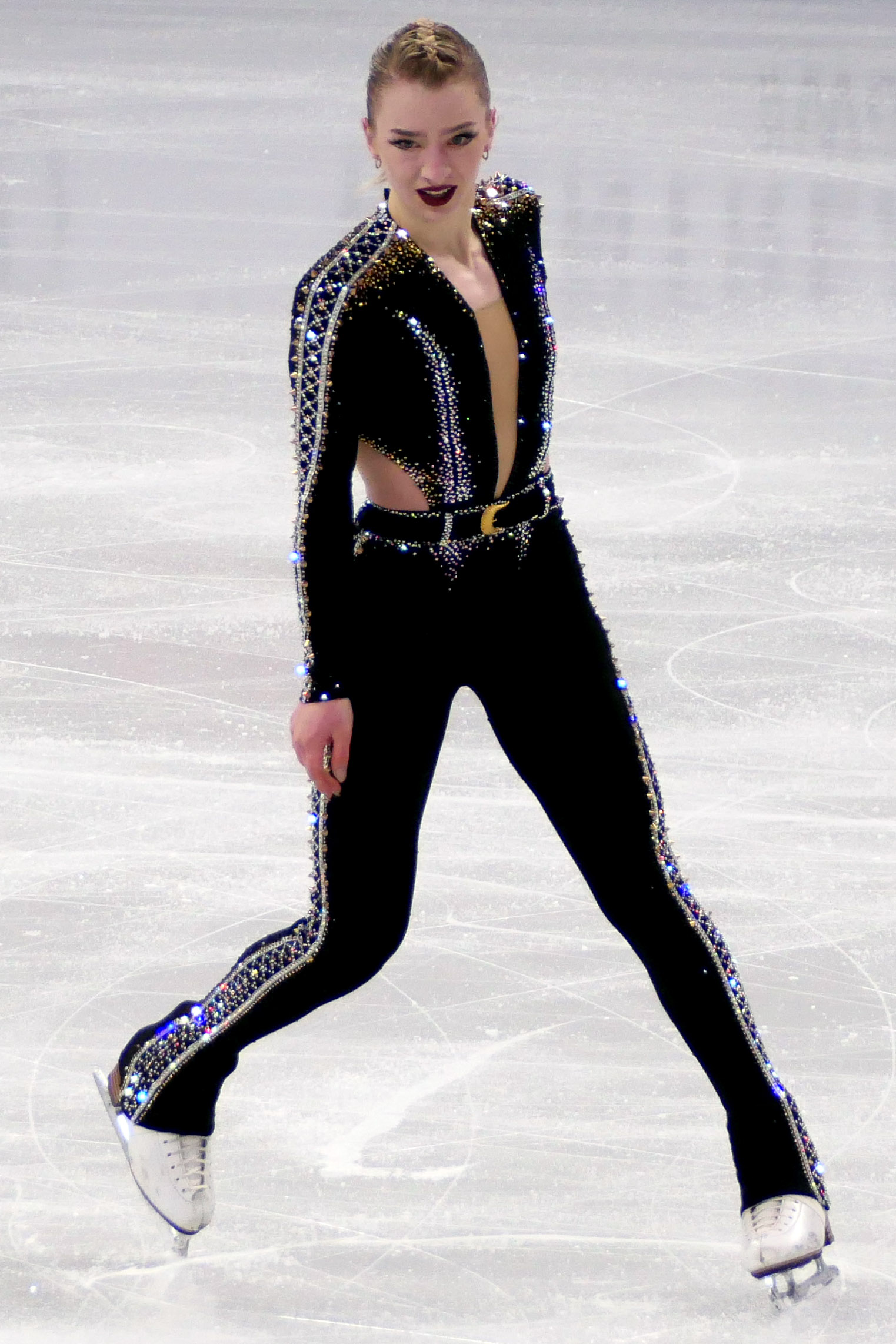
Glenn during her short program at the 2024 World Championships

For the new season's short program, choreographer Kaitlyn Weaver suggested to Glenn the Yeah Yeah Yeahs song "Heads Will Roll", which she initially considered to be "out there" for her but then accepted. Weaver's vogueing choreography also appealed to her. Glenn sustained a severe concussion and re-fractured her orbital bone after an on-ice collision with another skater in practice that set back her training by three weeks, resulting in her missing the Challenger series and other early competitions.

Glenn was assigned to start the Grand Prix at Skate America, which had special significance for her as it was to be held within the Dallas–Fort Worth metroplex in Allen, close to her hometown of Plano. Glenn said it felt "very bizarre" to begin the season this late but fared well in the short program, placing second in the segment with a new personal best score of 71.45. In the free skate, she made her fourteenth attempt at a triple Axel in competition, landing it cleanly for the first time. She was the sixth American woman to do so in competition and the fourth in international competition. However, she struggled in the second half of the program, falling twice and dropping to fifth place overall.

Glenn had a "disastrous" short program at the 2023 Grand Prix of Espoo in Finland, finishing eleventh of twelve skaters after performing an invalid double flip instead of a triple and only managing a double toe loop as the second part of her improvised jump combination. She rebounded in the free skate with a new personal best score of 133.78, after her only error was singling her planned triple Axel. Glenn came second in that segment and rose to the bronze medal, her second on the Grand Prix.

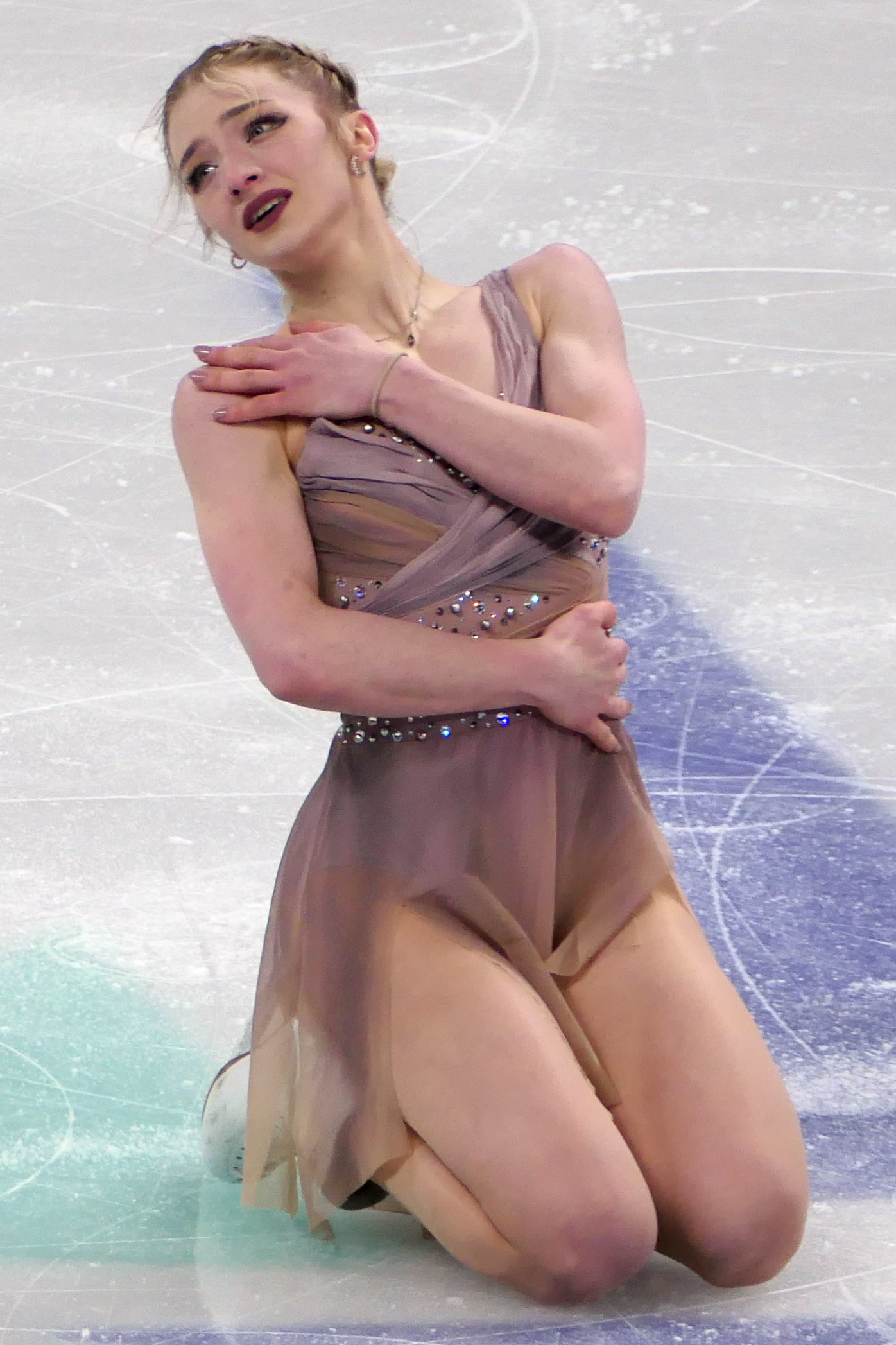
Glenn finishing her free skate at the 2024 World Championships

At the 2024 U.S. Championships, Glenn placed second in the short program with a clean skate. She opened her free skate with a successful triple Axel but struggled in the second half of the program, doubling a planned triple Lutz and singling a planned triple flip. Despite those mistakes, Glenn placed second in the segment and first overall. As someone who identifies as pansexual and bisexual, Glenn was the first openly LGBTQ+ woman to win the national championship.

Glenn had been preemptively assigned to the 2024 Four Continents Championships, which were to occur the week following the national championships. However, she opted to withdraw after her national title victory, citing a need to focus on the World Championships that were to take place in Montreal in March. In the short program at the World Championships, Glenn landed her first two jumping passes successfully, but fell on her triple loop and came ninth in the segment. Glenn landed a triple Axel in the free skate, but other jump errors caused her to finish tenth overall.

In an April interview, Glenn reflected on the season, her national title, and her goals for the 2024–25 season. Glenn described suffering from impostor syndrome and her desire to improve her mental focus during the off-season.

=== 2024–25 season: Grand Prix Final gold and second national title ===
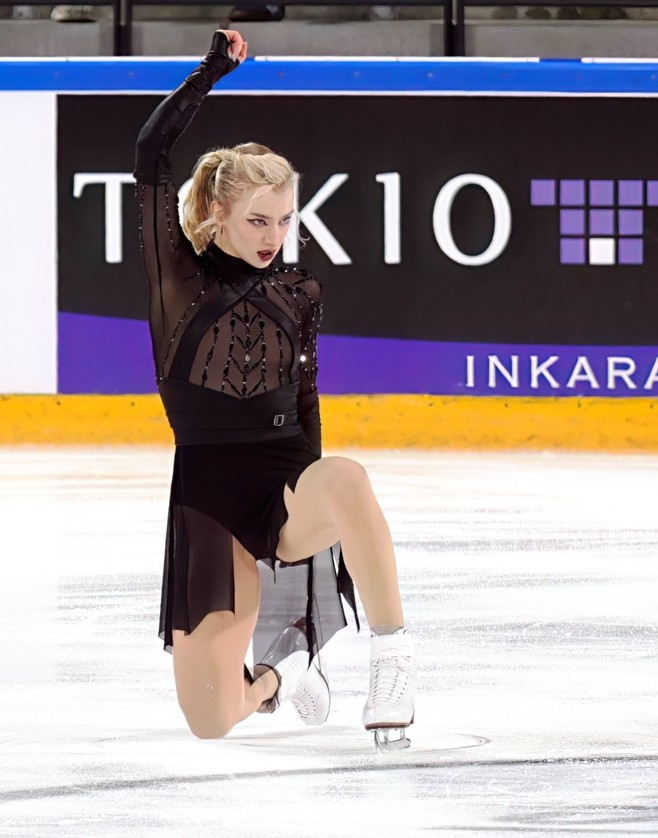
Glenn during her short program at the 2024 Grand Prix de France

In preparation for the 2024–25 season, Glenn incorporated neurotherapy into her training regimen at the recommendation of her sports psychologist. These sessions, held multiple times per week, were designed to help regulate her nervous system and improve her focus during competition. Glenn later credited this work with helping her "feel more in control of my own brain than I ever was before."

Glenn began the season by winning gold at the 2024 Lombardia Trophy. She set new personal bests in the short program (75.71), free skate (137.18), and overall total (212.89), and successfully landed a triple Axel in both segments of the competition.

At her first Grand Prix event, the 2024 Grand Prix de France, Glenn landed a triple Axel in the short program; her score of 78.14 was the highest ever earned by an American woman. In the free skate, she had several errors, including a botched landing on her triple Axel and a fall on her triple flip jump. She placed third in the free skate but remained in first overall due to the almost twelve-point lead she had over silver medalist, Wakaba Higuchi, in the short program. At 25, Glenn became the oldest American woman to win a Grand Prix title for the first time.

Later in November, at her second Grand Prix Event, the 2024 Cup of China, Glenn landed a triple Axel in the short program, though it was deemed a quarter turn short, and she stumbled in her jump combination. Despite this, Glenn finished the short program in a narrow second place, just .02 points behind the leader, Mone Chiba. In the free program, she landed eight triple jumps, including a triple Axel, to win the free skate with a personal best score, and she won the competition overall qualifying her for the Grand Prix Final.

At the Grand Prix Final in December, Glenn led the short program, where she successfully landed a triple Axel. In the free skate, she doubled a planned triple and two-footed another jump; however, she finished with the highest free skate score as well to win the competition. Glenn was the only non-Japanese competitor at the Grand Prix Final. She was the first American woman to win the Grand Prix Final in almost fifteen years since Alissa Czisny won it in 2010.

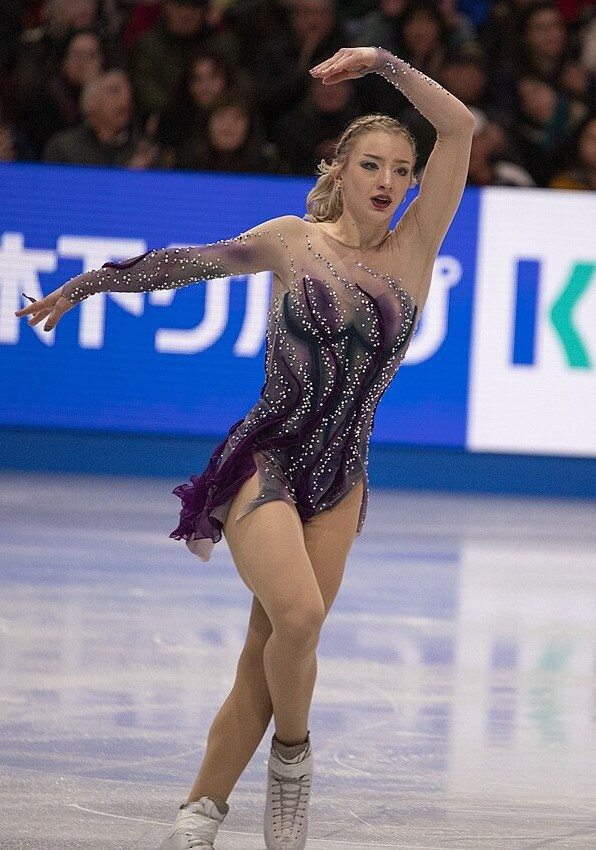
Glenn during her free skate at the 2025 World Championships

Glenn competed at the 2025 U.S. Figure Skating Championships in January. In her short program, she double-footed the landing of her opening triple Axel, then popped her planned triple flip-triple toe loop combination into a triple-double. She finished the segment in third place. In the free skate, she landed a clean triple Axel, and though she fell on her last jump, Glenn won her second national title. Her final score of 216.79 points was 1.46 points over that of silver medalist Alysa Liu, which was the second-narrowest margin of victory at the US Championships since the replacement of the 6.0 scoring system.

On March 2, 2025, Glenn took part in "Legacy on Ice," an ice show organized by U.S. Figure Skating that paid tribute to lives lost aboard American Eagle Flight 5342. Glenn's performance was additionally dedicated to her grandmother, who died on February 28. A couple weeks later, Glenn competed at the 2025 World Championships in Boston, Massachusetts, United States. Following a fall on her triple Axel attempt, Glenn placed ninth in the short program. She went on to deliver a stronger free skate, however, placing fourth in that competition segment and moving up to fifth place overall. After the event, Glenn opened up about her struggles with mental health resulting from the loss and grief following the death of her grandmother and the American Eagle Flight 5342 accident.

Selected to compete for Team U.S.A. at the 2025 World Team Trophy the following month, Glenn placed seventh in the women's short program after falling on an attempted triple Axel and only performing a triple flip-double toe rather than a triple flip-triple toe. Glenn went on to skate a clean free skate, scoring a new personal best and placing second overall in that segment, behind Alysa Liu. These placements helped secure the gold medal for Team U.S.A.

=== 2025–26 season: Milano Cortina Olympic team gold and third consecutive national title ===
In addition to opting to keep her free skate from the previous season, Glenn also worked with choreographer Kaitlyn Weaver to create a new short program to the song, "Like a Prayer" by Madonna. During the creative process, she also had the opportunity to work with one of Madonna's dancers.

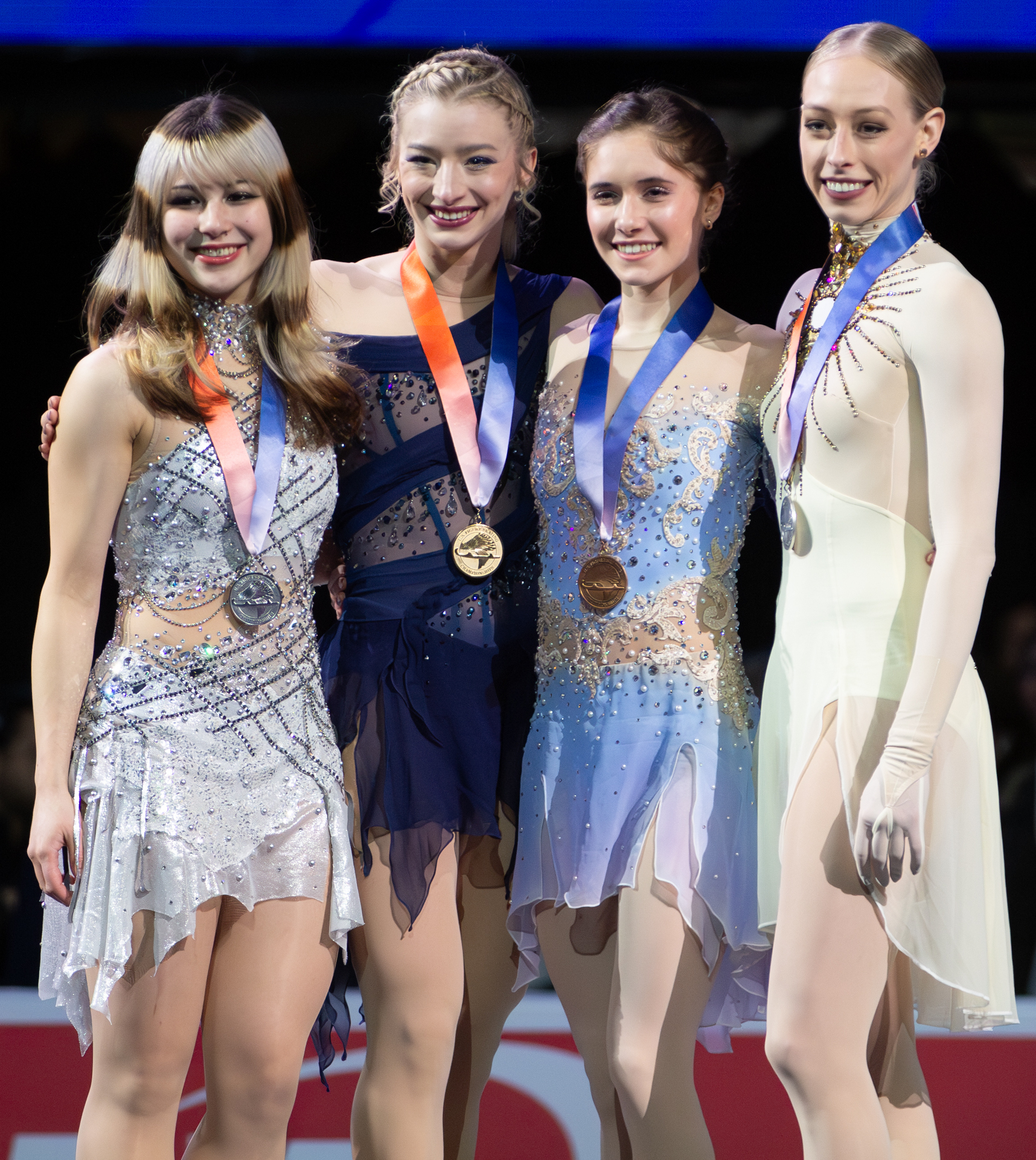
Glenn (center left) during the medal ceremony at the 2026 U.S. Championships with Alysa Liu (far left), Isabeau Levito (center right), and Bradie Tennell (far right)

Glenn began the season by competing at the 2025 CS Nebelhorn Trophy, where she won the gold medal. The following month, she competed at the 2025 Cup of China, winning the gold medal for a second consecutive time and edging out teammate and reigning World Champion, Alysa Liu. The following month, Glenn finished second at 2025 Finlandia Trophy behind Mone Chiba, qualifying for the Grand Prix Final. At the final, Glenn placed sixth in the short program after singling a planned triple Axel and placed fourth in the free skate with a season's best of 144.65, finishing fourth overall.

In January, Glenn competed at the 2026 U.S. Championships. In the short program, Alysa Liu, skating before her, had set a new national women's record score; Glenn did so as well in her performance. She also placed first in the free skate to win her third consecutive national title. She was subsequently named to the 2026 Winter Olympic team. At age twenty-six, Glenn became the oldest U.S women's singles skater to qualify for the Olympics since 1928.

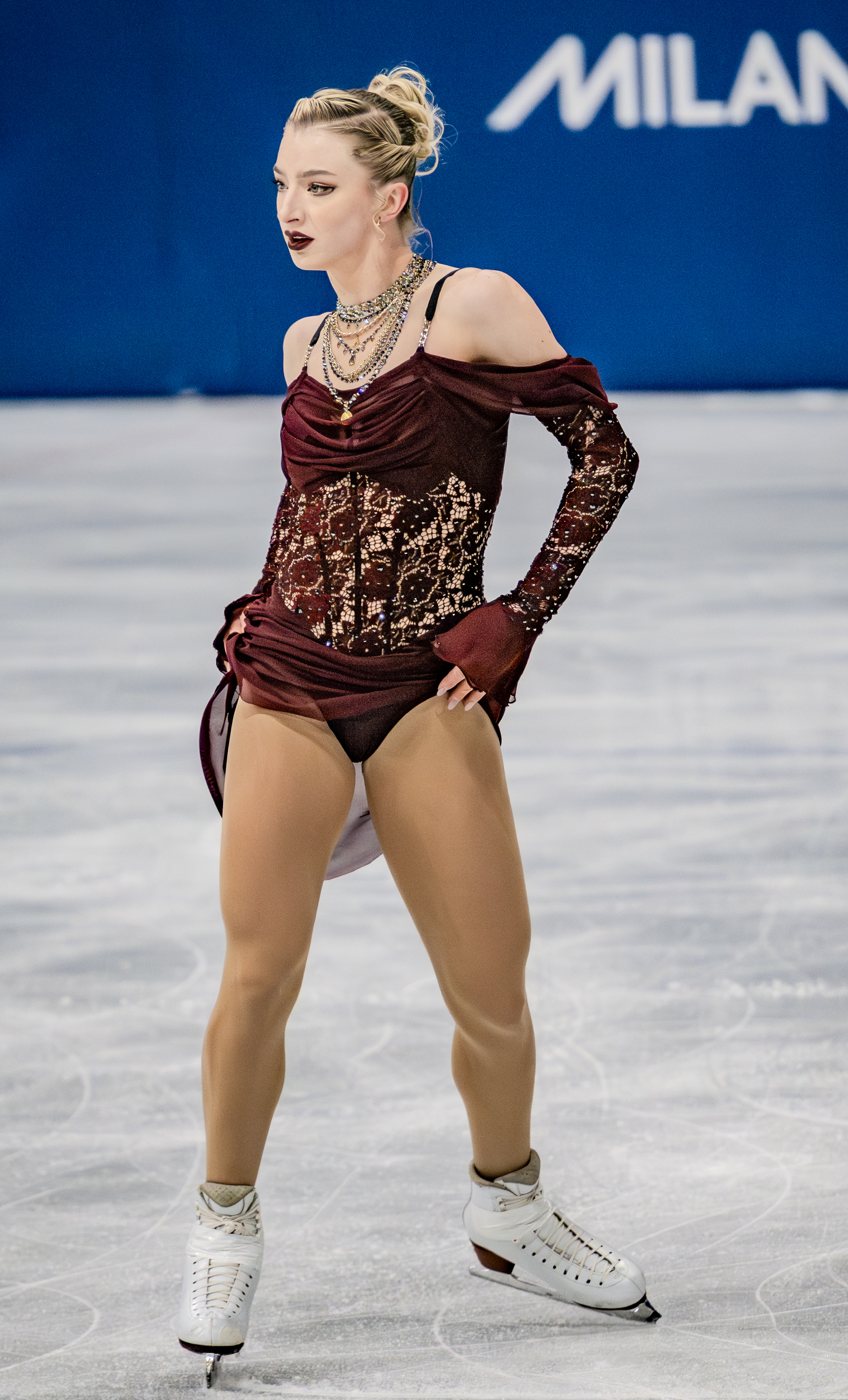
Glenn during a practice session at the 2026 Winter Olympics

On February 8, Glenn took part in the women's free skate portion of the Team Event. She placed third in that segment behind Kaori Sakamoto and Anastasiia Gubanova after stepping out of a planned triple flip, failing to perform a triple-triple combination, and landing her triple Lutz on the quarter. Despite this, Glenn managed to accumulate enough points to help secure an Olympic gold medal for Team USA. She also became the first openly LGBTQ+ woman to represent the United States in Olympic singles' figure skating and the fifth woman to land a triple Axel at the Winter Olympic Games.

On February 17, Glenn competed in the short program segment of the event. Although she opened the program with a clean triple Axel and triple flip-triple toe combination, she doubled her planned triple loop, which rendered that element invalid, and received zero points for it. The error cost her around seven points, dropping her from likely medal contention to thirteenth place.

Two days later, Glenn delivered an almost flawless free skate apart from putting a hand down on her final triple loop jump. As a result, she scored a season's best free skate and combined total score. Her performance was strong enough for her to place third in the free skate segment and climb up to fifth place overall.

At the 2026 World Championships in Prague, Czech Republic, Glenn finished third in the short program, achieving a small bronze medal behind Mone Chiba and Kaori Sakamoto of Japan. She placed ninth in the free skating segment, dropping to sixth place overall.

=== 2026–27 season ===
Initially assigned to Skate America and NHK Trophy, Glenn withdrew from her Grand Prix assignments due to conflicting schedules as she was on Dancing with the Stars.

== Other ventures ==
=== Dancing with the Stars ===
On September 2, 2026, it was announced that Glenn would participate in season thirty-five of the ABC competition series Dancing with the Stars. She was partnered with professional dancer Pasha Pashkov. During the eighth week of competition, Glenn became the first woman in Dancing with the Stars history to lead her male partner in a routine.

Amber Glenn – Dancing with the Stars (season 35)
Week	Dance	Music	Judges' scores (Note: Individual judges' scores are listed in the following order: Carrie Ann Inaba, Derek Hough, Bruno Tonioli.)			Total score	Result
1	Cha-cha-cha	"Smooth" — Santana feat. Rob Thomas	6	6	6	18	Safe
2	Tango	"All the Things She Said" — Harrison	7	7	7	21	Safe
3	Foxtrot	"Hold the Line" – Toto	8	8	8	24	Safe
4	Rumba	"Hero" — Mariah Carey	7	8	8	23	Safe
5	Samba	"Mi Gente" – J Balvin and Willy William	8	9	8	34 (Note: Amber and Pasha also received a score of 9 from guest judge Joe Buck.)	Safe
6	Contemporary	"Breathe Me" — Sia	10	9	9	38 (Note: Amber and Pasha also received a score of 10 from guest judge Kym Johnson.)	Safe
7	Argentine tango	"Perfection" — Clint Mansell	9	9	9	36 (Note: Amber and Pasha also received a score of 9 from guest judge Shirley Ballas.)	Safe
8	Quickstep	"A Star Is Born" (from Hercules)	8	9	9	34 (Note: Amber and Pasha also received a score of 8 from guest judge Cynthia Erivo.)	Safe
8	Freestyle (Team Slaytopia)	"Zoo" (from Zootopia 2)	9	9	9	36 (Note: Team Slaytopia also received a score of 9 from guest judge Cynthia Erivo.)	Safe
9 (Quarterfinals)	Paso doble	"Bring Me to Life" — Evanescence	9	9	10	28	Safe
9 (Quarterfinals)	Rumba (Dance-off)	"The Boy Is Mine" — Brandy & Monica	Winners			(28+2=30)	Safe
10 (Semifinals)	Salsa	"Bemba Colorá" — Celia Cruz	10	10	10	30	Safe
10 (Semifinals)	Viennese Waltz	"Dangerous Woman" — Ariana Grande	10	10	10	30	Safe
11 (Finals)	Quickstep	"Sing Sing Sing" — Louis Prima					TBA
11 (Finals)	TBA	TBA					TBA
11 (Finals)	Freestyle	"Like A Prayer" and "Music" — Madonna					TBA

== Personal life ==
Glenn was born October 28, 1999, in Plano, Texas. Her father, Richard, is a police sergeant and her mother, Cathlene, is a fitness instructor. She also has a younger sister, Brooke. She was homeschooled from the second grade until her senior year of high school.

Glenn identifies as bisexual and pansexual, and is the first openly LGBTQ women's singles skater on Team USA. Politically, Glenn has publicly criticized the second Trump administration's approach to the LGBTQ community.

In 2015, Glenn revealed that as she was transitioning to the senior ranks of figure skating, she was criticized for her appearance, body shape, and costumes. As a result, she internalized that criticism and ultimately began developing depression, anxiety, and an eating disorder; then in late 2015, she was temporarily checked into an inpatient facility due to experiencing suicidal thoughts. She has also been open about her struggles with being an elite-level athlete with ADHD.

Glenn is a fan of anime and the trading card game Magic: The Gathering. In November 2020, she revealed that she worked with the creative team of the Yuri on Ice film during production in August 2017. Glenn's dog, Uki, is named after a Magic: The Gathering card. During the 2026 Winter Olympics, Glenn went viral for opening a booster pack during the closing ceremony. Following the Olympics, Glenn received a box of Magic products from Wizards of the Coast and attended the Magic: The Gathering x Marvel launch event.

On May 28, 2026, Glenn was awarded the key to the city by her hometown of Plano, Texas. The city's mayor additionally proclaimed the date as "Amber Glenn Day".

Glenn served as a grand marshal for the 2026 Pikes Peak Pride Parade in Colorado Springs alongside Colorado Attorney General Phil Weiser. That same month, Glenn teamed up with HBO Max to make a promotional video for Heated Rivalry where she and cosplayer Lena Lemon reenacted scenes from the show as gender swapped versions of Ilya Rozanov and Shane Hollander, respectively.

Her mantra is "Believe and Breathe", a phrase that also serves as branding for her merchandise.

== Programs ==
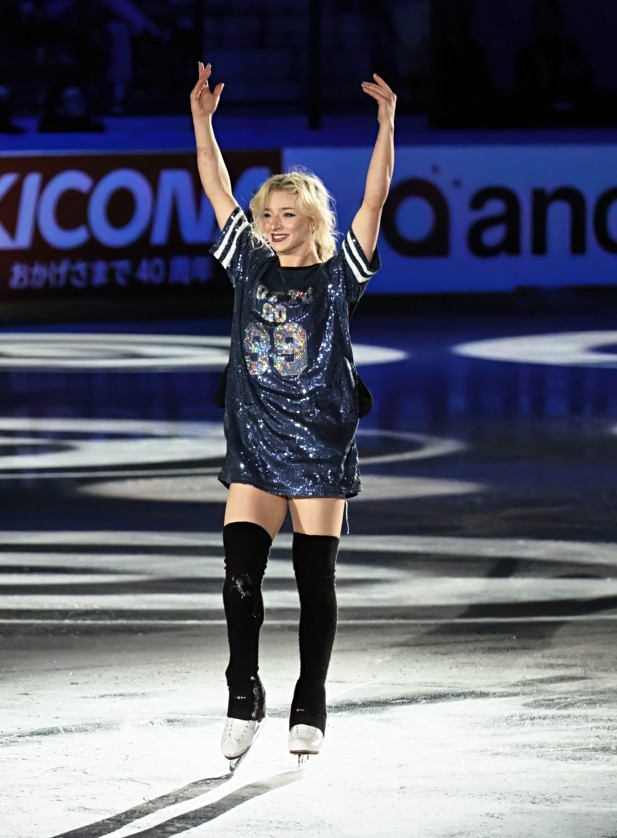
Glenn during the gala at the 2024 Grand Prix de France

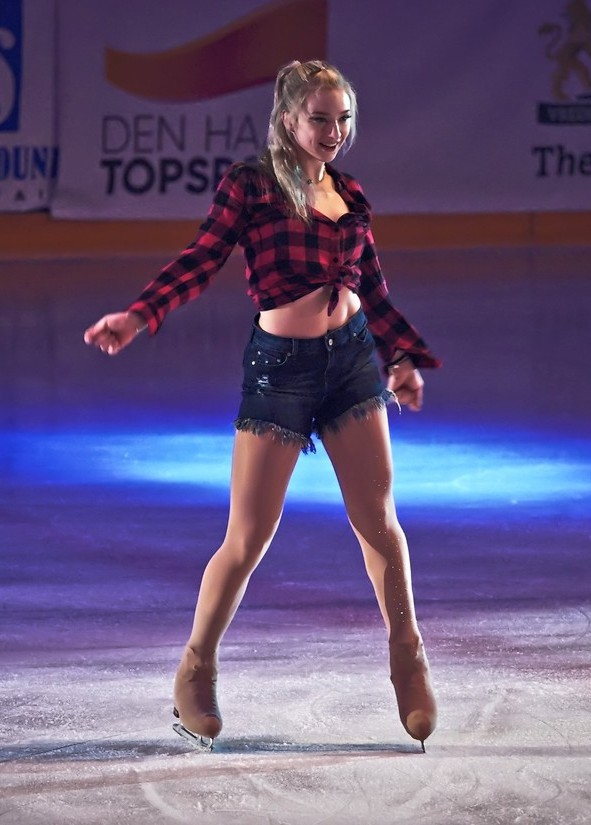
Glenn performing her exhibition program at the 2019 Challenge Cup

Competition and exhibition programs by season
Season	Short program	Free skate program	Exhibition program
2011–12	El Tango de Roxanne: From Moulin Rouge!'; Performed by Ewan McGregor, Jacek Koman, & José Feliciano	Black Swan Soundtrack: Composed by Clint Mansell	—N/a
2012–13	El Conquistador: Composed by Maxime Rodriguez; Choreo. by Walter Afalla	Slumdog Millionaire Soundtrack: Composed by A. R. Rahman; Choreo. by Walter Afalla	—N/a
2013–14	"Summertime": By Giovanni; Choreo by Nick Traxler	"Who Wants to Live Forever": By Queen; Performed by David Garrett; Choreo by Nick Traxler	"Let It Go": From Frozen; Composed by Kristen Anderson-Lopez & Robert Lopez; Performed by Idina Menzel
2014–15	"Summertime"	Medley: 1. El Conquistador; Composed by Maxime Rodriguez; 2. "Aranjuez"; Performed by Roni Benise; Choreo. by Rohene Ward	—N/a
2015–16	"Feeling Good": Performed by Nina Simone; Choreo. by Julia Golovina	Les Misérables Soundtrack: Composed by Claude-Michel Schönberg; Choreo. by Julia Golovina	—N/a
2016–17	"Send In the Clowns": From A Little Night Music; Composed by Stephen Sondheim; Performed by Susan Boyle; Choreo. by Scott Brown	Rhapsody in Blue: Composed by George Gershwin; Choreo. by Darlene Cain	"Ghost": By Halsey
2017–18	"Fever" (Heat Version): Performed by Beyoncé; Choreo. by Scott Brown	The Red Violin Soundtrack: Composed by John Corigliano; Choreo. by Scott Brown	—N/a
2018–19	"Gravity": By Sara Bareilles; Choreo. by Daniil Barantsev	"Bang Bang (My Baby Shot Me Down)": Performed by Lady Gaga; Choreo. by Daniil Barantsev	"She Used to Be Mine": From Waitress; By Sara Bareilles; Choreo. by Amber Glenn
2018–19	"Gravity": By Sara Bareilles; Choreo. by Daniil Barantsev	"Bang Bang (My Baby Shot Me Down)": Performed by Lady Gaga; Choreo. by Daniil Barantsev	"Whole Lotta Woman": By Kelly Clarkson
2019–20	"Scars": By Madilyn Bailey; Choreo. by Denali, Amber Glenn	"Gravity"	"Whole Lotta Woman"
2020–21	"Scars"	"Rain, In Your Black Eyes": Composed by Ezio Bosso; Choreo. by Misha Ge	—N/a
2021–22	"Scars"	"Rain, In Your Black Eyes"	"Bad Guy": By Billie Eilish
2021–22	Experience: Composed by Ludovico Einaudi; Performed by Greta Svabo Bech; Choreo. by Misha Ge	"Rain, In Your Black Eyes"	"Body Love Part 1": By Mary Lambert
2022–23	"Hit the Road Jack": Performed by 2WEI; Choreo. by Katherine Hill	"Without You": By Ursine Vulpine & Annaca; Choreo. by Misha Ge	"Bad Guy"
2023–24	"Heads Will Roll": By Yeah Yeah Yeahs; Performed by Elephant Music; Choreo. by Kaitlyn Weaver & Randi Strong	"Exogenesis: Symphony Part 3": By Muse; Choreo. by Katherine Hill	"Bad Guy"
2023–24	"Heads Will Roll": By Yeah Yeah Yeahs; Performed by Elephant Music; Choreo. by Kaitlyn Weaver & Randi Strong	"Exogenesis: Symphony Part 3": By Muse; Choreo. by Katherine Hill	"Vampire": By Olivia Rodrigo
2024–25	"This Time": By Janet Jackson; Choreo. by Kaitlyn Weaver & Randi Strong	Medley: 1. "I Will Find You"; Performed by Audiomachine; 2. "The Return"; Performed by CLANN; Choreo. by Katherine Hill	"Hot to Go!": By Chappell Roan
2024–25	"This Time": By Janet Jackson; Choreo. by Kaitlyn Weaver & Randi Strong	Medley: 1. "I Will Find You"; Performed by Audiomachine; 2. "The Return"; Performed by CLANN; Choreo. by Katherine Hill	"Vampire"
2024–25	"This Time": By Janet Jackson; Choreo. by Kaitlyn Weaver & Randi Strong	Medley: 1. "I Will Find You"; Performed by Audiomachine; 2. "The Return"; Performed by CLANN; Choreo. by Katherine Hill	"Rise Up": By Andra Day
2024–25	"This Time": By Janet Jackson; Choreo. by Kaitlyn Weaver & Randi Strong	Medley: 1. "I Will Find You"; Performed by Audiomachine; 2. "The Return"; Performed by CLANN; Choreo. by Katherine Hill	"Heads Will Roll"
2025–26	"Like a Prayer (Choir Version)": From Deadpool & Wolverine; Performed by Madonna & I'll Take You There Choir; Arranged by Karl Hugo; Choreo. by Kaitlyn Weaver	"I Will Find You & The Return"	"That's Life": Performed by Lady Gaga
2026–27	"Just a Girl": From Yellowjackets; Performed by Florence and the Machine; Choreo. by Katherine Hill & Amber Glenn	"Exogenesis: Symphony Part 3"	—N/a

== Awards ==
Year	Award	Category	Result	Ref.
2014	U.S. Figure Skating	Athlete Alumni Ambassador (3A)	Overall Winner	
2021	Professional Skaters Association	Best Performance Ladies	Won	
2023	Skating Magazine	Reader's Choice	Won	
2026	2026 Winter Olympics	Fair Play Award	Nominated	
2026	The Queerties	Sports Hero	Runner-up	
2026	ISU Figure Skating Awards	Most Entertaining Program	Nominated	
2026	ISU Figure Skating Awards	Best Costume	Nominated	

== Competitive highlights ==
- GP – Event of the ISU Grand Prix Series
- JGP – Event of the ISU Junior Grand Prix Series
- CS – Event of the ISU Challenger Series
- TBD – Assigned
- WD – Withdrew from competition
- Medals at team events are awarded for the team results only. Individual placements at team events are listed in parentheses.

Competition placements at senior level
Season	2014–15	2015–16	2016–17	2017–18	2018–19	2019–20	2020–21	2021–22	2022–23	2023–24	2024–25	2025–26	2026–27
Winter Olympics												5th	
Winter Olympics (Team event)												1st	
World Championships									12th	10th	5th	6th	
Four Continents Championships						9th			7th				
Grand Prix Final											1st	4th	
U.S. Championships	13th		8th	8th	7th	5th	2nd	WD	3rd	1st	1st	1st	
World Team Trophy									1st (6th)		1st (3rd)		
GP Cup of China				10th		6th					1st	1st	
GP Finland										3rd		2nd	
GP France											1st		
GP NHK Trophy								7th	11th				
GP Skate America						7th	5th	6th	3rd	5th			
CS Finlandia Trophy								10th					
CS Golden Spin of Zagreb			4th					2nd		2nd			
CS Lombardia Trophy				8th	6th				4th		1st		
CS Nebelhorn Trophy			5th									1st	
CS U.S. Classic						3rd							
Autumn Classic		6th											
Challenge Cup					4th								
Cranberry Cup									3rd				
Philadelphia Summer				5th	5th								

Competition placements at junior level
Season	2012–13	2013–14	2014–15	2015–16
World Junior Championships		7th		
U.S. Championships	5th	1st		
JGP Czech Republic		3rd		
JGP Estonia			6th	
JGP France			3rd	
JGP Latvia				5th

== Detailed results ==
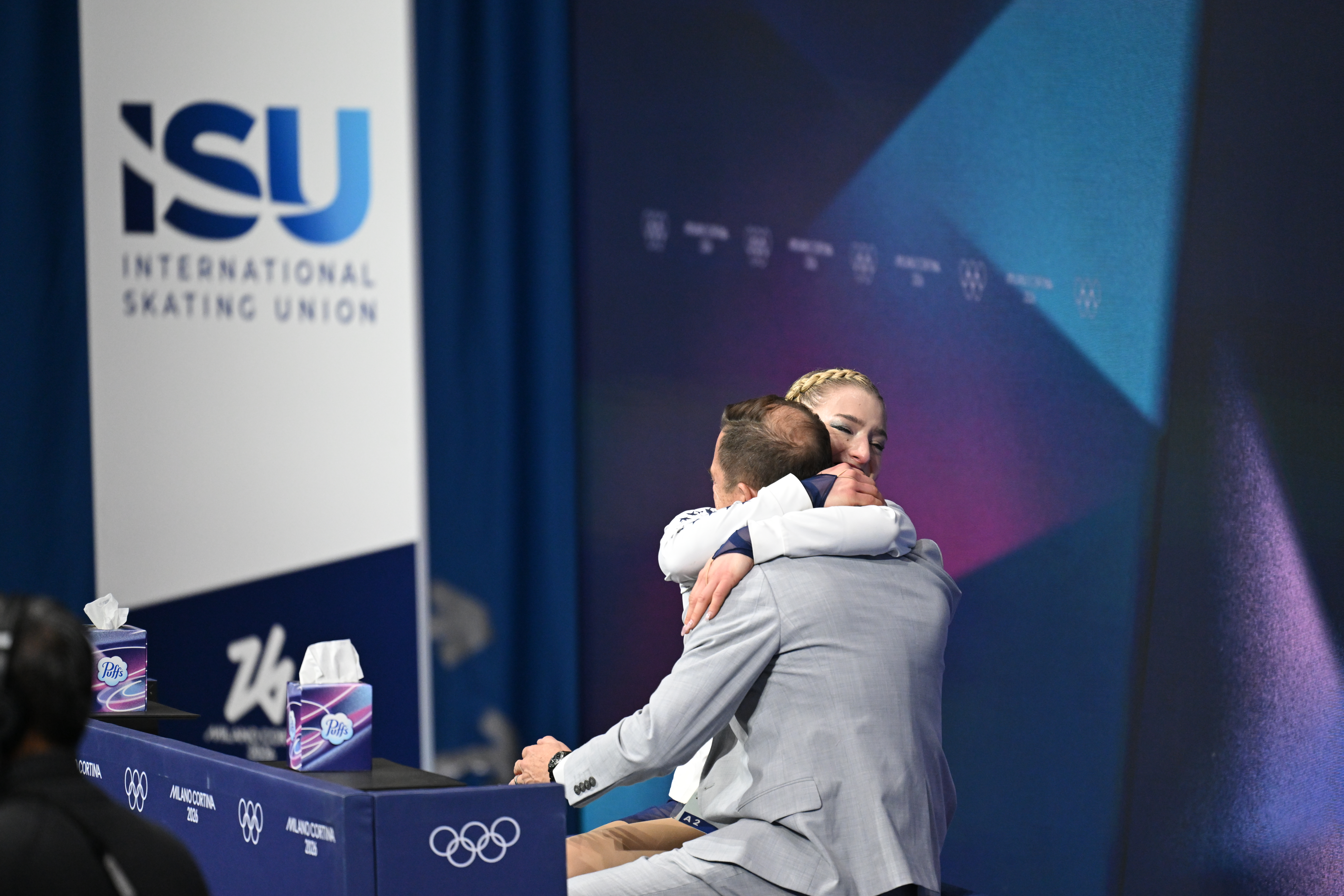
Glenn alongside her coach Damon Allen at the 2026 Winter Olympics

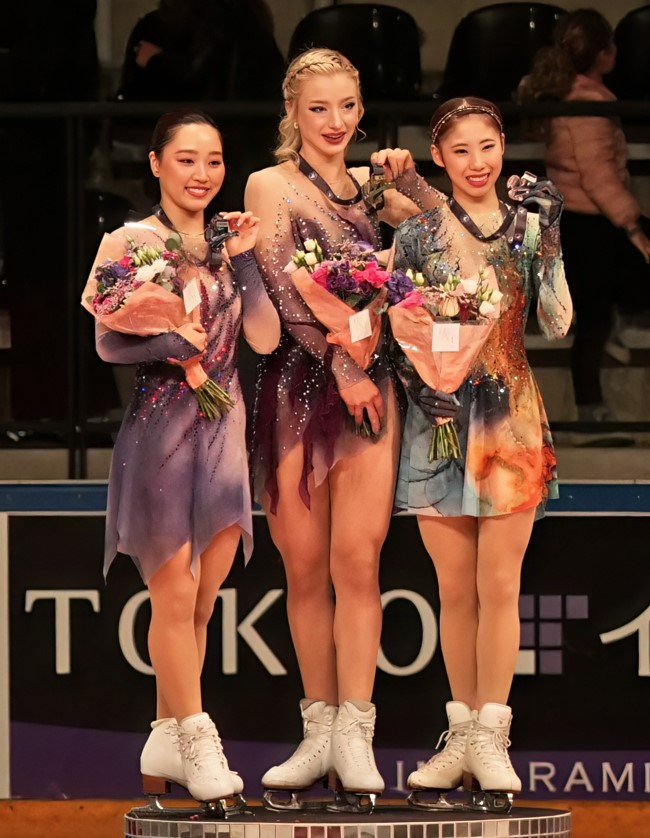
Glenn (center) during the women's medal ceremony at the 2024 Grand Prix de France with Wakaba Higuchi (left) and Rion Sumiyoshi (right)

ISU personal best scores in the +5/-5 GOE System
Segment	Type	Score	Event
Total	TSS	215.54	2024 Cup of China
Short program	TSS	78.14	2024 Grand Prix de France
Short program	TES	44.35	2024 Grand Prix de France
Short program	PCS	33.79	2024 Grand Prix de France
Free skating	TSS	148.93	2025 World Team Trophy
Free skating	TES	80.95	2025 World Team Trophy
Free skating	PCS	69.24	2024–25 Grand Prix Final

ISU personal best scores in the +3/-3 GOE System
Segment	Type	Score	Event
Total	TSS	183.60	2016 CS Golden Spin of Zagreb
Short program	TSS	67.93	2016 CS Golden Spin of Zagreb
Short program	TES	37.05	2016 CS Golden Spin of Zagreb
Short program	PCS	30.88	2016 CS Golden Spin of Zagreb
Free skating	TSS	115.67	2016 CS Golden Spin of Zagreb
Free skating	TES	58.36	2013 JGP Czech Republic
Free skating	PCS	61.52	2016 CS Golden Spin of Zagreb

- Medals at team events are awarded for the team results only. Individual placements at team events are listed in parentheses.

=== Senior level ===
Results in the 2014–15 season
Date	Event	SP		FS		Total	
Date	Event	P	Score	P	Score	P	Score
Jan 17-25, 2015	(United States) 2015 U.S. Championships	7	63.04	15	96.37	13	159.41

Results in the 2015–16 season
Date	Event	SP		FS		Total	
Date	Event	P	Score	P	Score	P	Score
Oct 12-15, 2015	(Canada) 2015 Autumn Classic International	6	52.08	7	70.20	6	122.28

Results in the 2016–17 season
Date	Event	SP		FS		Total	
Date	Event	P	Score	P	Score	P	Score
Sep 24–26, 2016	(Germany) 2016 CS Nebelhorn Trophy	4	55.92	6	101.76	5	157.68
Dec 7–10, 2016	(Croatia) 2016 CS Golden Spin of Zagreb	2	67.93	4	115.67	4	183.60
Jan 14–22, 2017	(United States) 2017 U.S. Championships	12	56.34	8	116.29	8	172.63

Results in the 2017–18 season
Date	Event	SP		FS		Total	
Date	Event	P	Score	P	Score	P	Score
Aug 3–6, 2017	(United States) 2017 Philadelphia Summer International	7	55.40	6	95.46	5	150.86
Sep 14–17, 2017	(Italy) 2017 CS Lombardia Trophy	8	57.44	11	92.52	8	149.96
Nov 3–5, 2017	2017 Cup of China	10	52.61	10	98.53	10	151.14
Jan 1–8, 2018	(United States) 2018 U.S. Championships	9	61.62	9	106.44	8	168.06

Results in the 2018–19 season
Date	Event	SP		FS		Total	
Date	Event	P	Score	P	Score	P	Score
Jul 30 – Aug 5, 2018	(United States) 2018 Philadelphia Summer International	2	54.53	8	68.25	5	122.78
Sep 13–16, 2018	(Italy) 2018 CS Lombardia Trophy	4	58.57	5	107.68	6	166.25
Jan 19–27, 2019	(United States) 2019 U.S. Championships	4	69.86	8	110.87	7	180.73
Feb 21–24, 2019	(Netherlands) 2019 International Challenge Cup	1	70.25	5	110.66	4	180.91

Results in the 2019–20 season
Date	Event	SP		FS		Total	
Date	Event	P	Score	P	Score	P	Score
Sep 17–22, 2019	(United States) 2019 CS U.S. International Classic	2	66.09	3	120.19	3	186.28
Oct 18–20, 2019	(United States) 2019 Skate America	7	64.71	9	104.92	7	169.63
Nov 8–10, 2019	2019 Cup of China	3	67.69	6	110.66	6	178.35
Jan 20–26, 2020	(United States) 2020 U.S. Championships	4	73.16	9	113.42	5	186.57
Feb 4–9, 2020	(South Korea) 2020 Four Continents Championships	9	65.39	9	125.44	7	190.83

Results in the 2020–21 season
Date	Event	SP		FS		Total	
Date	Event	P	Score	P	Score	P	Score
Oct 23–24, 2020	(United States) 2020 Skate America	5	67.85	6	122.24	5	190.09
Jan 11–21, 2021	(United States) 2021 U.S. Championships	5	70.83	2	144.50	2	215.33

Results in the 2021–22 season
Date	Event	SP		FS		Total	
Date	Event	P	Score	P	Score	P	Score
Oct 7–10, 2021	(Finland) 2021 CS Finlandia Trophy	10	60.76	10	122.70	10	183.46
Oct 22–24, 2021	(United States) 2021 Skate America	7	67.57	7	133.45	6	201.02
Nov 12–14, 2021	(Japan) 2021 NHK Trophy	6	63.43	8	112.40	7	175.83
Dec 7–11, 2021	(Croatia) 2021 CS Golden Spin of Zagreb	2	64.45	2	118.91	2	183.36
Jan 3–9, 2022	(United States) 2022 U.S. Championships	14	54.80	—N/a	—N/a	–	WD

Results in the 2022–23 season
Date	Event	SP		FS		Total	
Date	Event	P	Score	P	Score	P	Score
Aug 9–14, 2022	(United States) 2022 Cranberry Cup International	11	45.99	1	120.74	3	166.73
Sep 16–18, 2022	(Italy) 2022 CS Lombardia Trophy	8	55.99	4	121.02	4	177.01
Oct 21–23, 2022	(United States) 2022 Skate America	3	68.42	3	129.19	3	197.61
Nov 18–20, 2022	(Japan) 2022 NHK Trophy	11	52.04	8	117.32	11	169.36
Jan 26–28, 2023	(United States) 2023 U.S. Championships	4	68.96	3	138.48	3	207.44
Feb 7–12, 2023	(United States) 2023 Four Continents Championships	4	69.63	8	122.87	7	192.50
Mar 20–26, 2023	(Japan) 2023 World Championships	10	65.52	14	122.81	12	188.33
Apr 13–16 2023	(Japan) 2023 World Team Trophy	6	66.65	6	128.46	1 (6)	195.01

Results in the 2023–24 season
Date	Event	SP		FS		Total	
Date	Event	P	Score	P	Score	P	Score
Oct 20–22, 2023	(United States) 2023 Skate America	2	71.45	5	118.18	5	189.63
Nov 17–19, 2023	(Finland) 2023 Grand Prix of Espoo	11	51.61	2	133.78	3	185.39
Dec 6–9, 2023	(Croatia) 2023 CS Golden Spin of Zagreb	2	63.09	2	114.42	2	177.51
Jan 22–28, 2024	(United States) 2024 U.S. Championships	2	74.98	2	135.48	1	210.46
Mar 18–24, 2024	(Canada) 2024 World Championships	9	64.53	11	122.00	10	186.53

Results in the 2024–25 season
Date	Event	SP		FS		Total	
Date	Event	P	Score	P	Score	P	Score
Sep 12–15, 2024	(Italy) 2024 CS Lombardia Trophy	1	75.71	1	137.18	1	212.89
Nov 1–3, 2024	2024 Grand Prix de France	1	78.14	3	132.30	1	210.44
Nov 22–24, 2024	2024 Cup of China	2	70.84	1	144.70	1	215.54
Dec 5–8, 2024	(France) 2024–25 Grand Prix Final	1	70.04	1	142.03	1	212.07
Jan 20–26, 2025	(United States) 2025 U.S. Championships	3	70.91	1	145.88	1	216.79
Mar 25–30, 2025	(United States) 2025 World Championships	9	67.65	4	138.00	5	205.65
Apr 17–20, 2025	(Japan) 2025 World Team Trophy	7	63.70	2	148.93	1 (3)	212.63

Results in the 2025–26 season
Date	Event	SP		FS		Total	
Date	Event	P	Score	P	Score	P	Score
Sep 25–27, 2025	(Germany) 2025 CS Nebelhorn Trophy	2	73.69	2	140.80	1	214.49
Oct 24–26, 2025	2025 Cup of China	3	73.04	1	141.74	1	214.78
Nov 21–23, 2025	(Finland) 2025 Finlandia Trophy	1	75.72	2	137.69	2	213.41
Dec 4–7, 2025	(Japan) 2025–26 Grand Prix Final	6	66.85	4	144.65	4	211.50
Jan 4–11, 2026	(United States) 2026 U.S. Championships	1	83.05	1	150.50	1	233.55
Feb 6–8, 2026	(Italy) 2026 Winter Olympics – Team event	—N/a	—N/a	3	138.62	1	—N/a
Feb 17–19, 2026	(Italy) 2026 Winter Olympics	13	67.39	3	147.52	5	214.91
Mar 24–29, 2026	(Czech Republic) 2026 World Championships	3	72.65	9	130.47	6	203.12

=== Junior level ===
Results in the 2012–13 season
Date	Event	SP		FS		Total	
Date	Event	P	Score	P	Score	P	Score
Jan 20–27, 2013	(United States) 2013 U.S. Championships (Junior)	7	45.28	6	86.42	5	131.70

Results in the 2013–14 season
Date	Event	SP		FS		Total	
Date	Event	P	Score	P	Score	P	Score
Oct 3–5, 2013	2013 JGP Czech Republic	4	56.84	3	107.34	3	164.18
Jan 5–12, 2014	(United States) 2014 U.S. Championships (Junior)	1	63.99	1	122.51	1	186.52
Mar 10–16, 2014	(Bulgaria) 2014 World Junior Championships	5	56.58	8	102.30	7	158.88

Results in the 2014–15 season
Date	Event	SP		FS		Total	
Date	Event	P	Score	P	Score	P	Score
Aug 21–23, 2014	2014 JGP France	3	54.71	4	93.32	3	148.03
Sep 25–27, 2014	2014 JGP Estonia	5	49.66	6	93.17	6	142.83

Results in the 2015–16 season
Date	Event	SP		FS		Total	
Date	Event	P	Score	P	Score	P	Score
Aug 26–29, 2015	2015 JGP Latvia	6	53.21	4	106.75	5	159.96
