= Ice Star =

International figure skating competition

- Status: Inactive
- Genre: International competition
- Frequency: Annual
- Venue: Minsk-Arena
- Location: Minsk
- Country: Belarus
- Inaugurated: 2012
- Most recent: 2021
- Organiser: Skating Union of Belarus

The Ice Star – originally called the Minsk-Arena Ice Star – was an annual figure skating competition sanctioned by the International Skating Union (ISU), organized and hosted by the Skating Union of Belarus at the Minsk-Arena in Minsk, Belarus. The competition debuted in 2012, and was also a Challenger Series event twice during its history. Medals were awarded in men's singles, women's singles, pair skating, and ice dance; and when the event was part of the Challenger Series, skaters earned points towards the World Standings and Season's World Ranking based on their results. On 1 March 2022, in accordance with a recommendation by the International Olympic Committee, the ISU banned all athletes and officials from Russia and Belarus from hosting or attending any international competitions due to the 2022 Russian invasion of Ukraine. Therefore, the 2021 Ice Star was the last iteration of this event to be held.

== History ==
The Ice Star – originally called the Minsk-Arena Ice Star – debuted in 2012. Yakov Godorozha of Ukraine won the men's event, Polina Shelepen of Russia won the women's event, and Julia Zlobina and Alexei Sitnikov of Azerbaijan won the ice dance event.

The ISU Challenger Series was introduced in 2014. It is a series of international figure skating competitions sanctioned by the International Skating Union (ISU) and organized by ISU member nations. The objective is to ensure consistent organization and structure within a series of international competitions linked together, providing opportunities for senior-level skaters to compete at the international level and also earn points towards the World Standings and Season's World Ranking. Challenger Series events had to be scheduled between 1 August and 15 December. When an event was held as part of the Challenger Series, it had to host at least three of the four disciplines (men's singles, women's singles, pair skating, and ice dance) and representatives from at least twelve different ISU member nations. The minimum number of entrants required for each discipline was: eight skaters each in men's singles and women's singles, five teams in pair skating, and six teams in ice dance. While ISU member nations were limited to sending a maximum of three skaters or teams per discipline to each event, Skate Canada could enter an unlimited number of entrants in their own event. Additionally, each skater or team was limited to participating in at most three Challenger Series events each season. The Ice Star was a Challenger Series event twice: in 2017 and 2019.

On 1 March 2022, the ISU banned all athletes and officials from Russia and Belarus from participating at any international competitions due to the 2022 Russian invasion of Ukraine. As such, the 2021 Ice Star was the last iteration of the competition to be held.

== Senior medalists ==
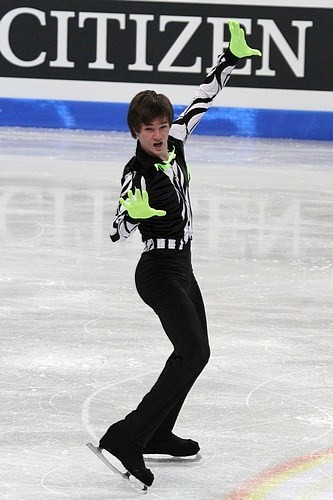
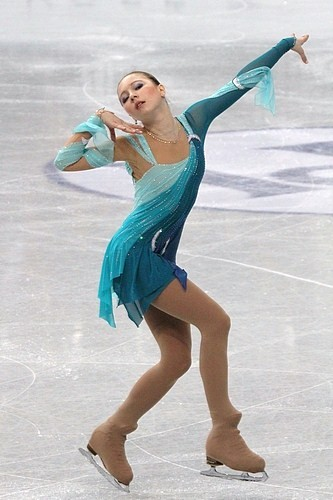
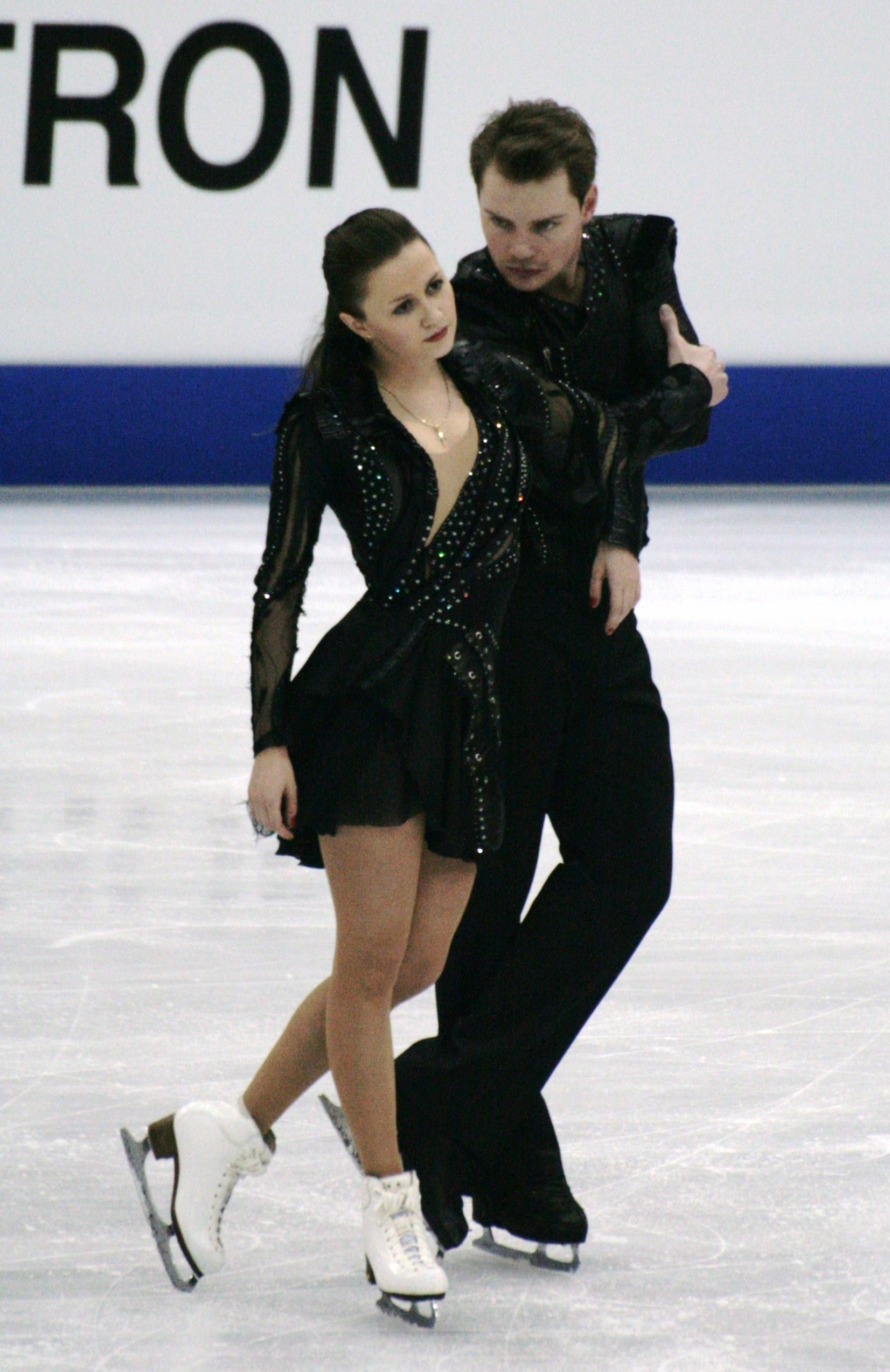
The inaugural Ice Star champions (from left to right): Yakov Godorozha of Ukraine (men's singles); Polina Shelepen of Russia (women's singles); and Julia Zlobina and Alexei Sitnikov of Azerbaijan (ice dance)

CS: Challenger Series event

=== Men's singles ===
Men's event medalists
Year	Gold	Silver	Bronze	Ref.
2012	(Ukraine) Yakov Godorozha	(Russia) Mark Shakhmatov	(Belarus) Vitali Luchanok	
2013	(Russia) Sergei Voronov	(Russia) Zhan Bush	(Belarus) Pavel Ignatenko	
2014	No men's competitors			
2015	(South Korea) Kim Jin-seo	(Russia) Evgeni Vlasov	(Azerbaijan) Larry Loupolover	
2016	(Ukraine) Ivan Pavlov	(Georgia (country)) Irakli Maysuradze	(Azerbaijan) Larry Loupolover	
2017 CS	(Russia) Sergei Voronov	(Georgia (country)) Morisi Kvitelashvili	(Israel) Daniel Samohin	
2018	(Latvia) Deniss Vasiļjevs	(Azerbaijan) Vladimir Litvintsev	(Armenia) Slavik Hayrapetyan	
2019 CS	(Italy) Daniel Grassl	(Russia) Artem Kovalev	(France) Adam Siao Him Fa	
2020	(Russia) Mikhail Kolyada	(Belarus) Konstantin Milyukov	(Russia) Evgeni Semenenko	
2021	(Russia) Andrei Mozalev	(Belarus) Konstantin Milyukov	(Belarus) Alexander Lebedev	

=== Women's singles ===
Women's event medalists
Year	Gold	Silver	Bronze	Ref.
2012	(Russia) Polina Shelepen	(Austria) Kerstin Frank	(Belarus) Krystsina Zakharanka	
2013	(Estonia) Helery Hälvin	(Belarus) Yanina Makeyenka	(Estonia) Svetlana Issakova	
2014	(Belarus) Yanina Makeyenka	(Lithuania) Aleksandra Golovkina	(Estonia) Helery Hälvin	
2015	(South Korea) Kim Sena	(Lithuania) Aleksandra Golovkina	(Estonia) Johanna Allik	
2016	(Ukraine) Anna Khnychenkova	(Russia) Evgenia Ivankova	(South Korea) Kim Sena	
2017 CS	(Kazakhstan) Elizabet Tursynbaeva	(Russia) Serafima Sakhanovich	(South Korea) An So-hyun	
2018	(Azerbaijan) Ekaterina Ryabova	(France) Léa Serna	(Norway) Camilla Gjersem	
2019 CS	(Russia) Sofia Samodurova	(South Korea) Kim Ha-nul	(Azerbaijan) Ekaterina Ryabova	
2020	(Belarus) Viktoriia Safonova	(Russia) Anastasiia Guliakova	(Russia) Sofia Samodurova	
2021	(Belarus) Viktoriia Safonova	(Russia) Anastasiia Guliakova	(Ukraine) Anastasiia Shabotova	

=== Pairs ===
Pairs event medalists
Year	Gold	Silver	Bronze	Ref.
2012	No pairs competitors			
2013	(Russia); Kristina Astakhova; Maxim Kurdyukov	(Belarus); Maria Paliakova; Nikita Bochkov	(Russia); Arina Voevodina; Mikhail Akulov	
2014–16	No pairs competitors			
2017 CS	(Russia); Aleksandra Boikova; Dmitrii Kozlovskii	(Germany); Annika Hocke; Ruben Blommaert	(Israel); Paige Conners; Evgeni Krasnopolski	
2018	(Austria); Miriam Ziegler; Severin Kiefer	(Spain); Laura Barquero; Aritz Maestu	(Russia); Daria Pavliuchenko; Denis Khodykin	
2019	No pairs competitors			
2020	(Belarus); Bogdana Lukashevich; Alexander Stepanov	No other competitors		
2021	(Belarus); Ekaterina Yurova; Dmitry Bushlanov	(Belarus); Bogdana Lukashevich; Alexander Stepanov	No other competitors	

=== Ice dance ===
Ice dance event medalists
Year	Gold	Silver	Bronze	Ref.
2012	(Azerbaijan); Julia Zlobina; Alexei Sitnikov	(Ukraine); Nadezhda Frolenkova; Vitali Nikiforov	(Belarus); Lesia Valadzenkava; Vitali Vakunov	
2013	(Russia); Ekaterina Bobrova; Dmitri Soloviev	(Russia); Victoria Sinitsina; Ruslan Zhiganshin	(Russia); Ekaterina Pushkash; Jonathan Guerreiro	
2014	(Russia); Ksenia Monko; Kirill Khaliavin	(Russia); Evgenia Kosigina; Nikolai Moroshkin	(Belarus); Viktoria Kavaliova; Yurii Bieliaiev	
2015	(Russia); Ksenia Monko; Kirill Khaliavin	(Belarus); Viktoria Kavaliova; Yurii Bieliaiev	(South Korea); Rebeka Kim; Kirill Minov	
2016	(Ukraine); Oleksandra Nazarova; Maksym Nikitin	(Turkey); Alisa Agafonova; Alper Uçar	(Russia); Sofia Evdokimova; Egor Bazin	
2017 CS	(Italy); Anna Cappellini; Luca Lanotte	(Russia); Tiffany Zahorski; Jonathan Guerreiro	(Russia); Victoria Sinitsina; Nikita Katsalapov	
2018	(Russia); Sofia Evdokimova; Egor Bazin	(Finland); Juulia Turkkila; Matthias Versluis	(Italy); Jasmine Tessari; Francesco Fioretti	
2019 CS	(Spain); Sara Hurtado; Kirill Khaliavin	(Poland); Natalia Kaliszek; Maksym Spodyriev	(Ukraine); Oleksandra Nazarova; Maksym Nikitin	
2020	(Belarus); Viktoria Semenjuk; Ilya Yukhimuk	(Belarus); Karina Sidarenka; Maksim Yalenich	No other competitors	
2021	(Belarus); Viktoria Semenjuk; Ilya Yukhimuk	(Russia); Ekaterina Mironova; Evgeni Ustenko	(Estonia); Aleksandra Samersova; Kevin Ojala	

== Junior results ==
=== Men's singles ===
Junior men's event medalists
Year	Gold	Silver	Bronze	Ref.
2012	(Ukraine) Ivan Pavlov	(Belarus) Pavel Ignatenko	(Germany) Markus Ramisch	
2013	(Russia) Adian Pitkeev	(Russia) Stanislav Andryunin	(Belarus) Anton Karpuk	
2014	(Russia) Andrei Vorotnikov	(Belarus) Anton Karpuk	(Georgia (country)) Irakli Maysuradze	
2015	(Ukraine) Ivan Shmuratko	(Belarus) Yakau Zenko	(Estonia) Aleksandr Selevko	
2016	(Russia) Artem Kovalev	(Sweden) Gabriel Folkesson	(Georgia (country)) Nika Egadze	
2017	(Russia) Vladimir Samoilov	(Georgia (country)) Irakli Maysuradze	(Russia) Artem Zotov	
2018	(Georgia (country)) Irakli Maysuradze	(Czech Republic) Matyáš Bělohradský	(Russia) Mark Kondratiuk	
2019	(Russia) Mark Kondratiuk	(Kazakhstan) Rakhat Bralin	(Belarus) Yauhenii Puzanau	
2020	(Belarus) Mikalai Kazlou	(Belarus) Aliaksandr Bahdanovich	(Belarus) Alexander Egorov	
2021	(Belarus) Vasil Barakhouski	(Russia) Daniil Shevtcov	(Belarus) Ilya Stsiapankou	

=== Women's singles ===
Junior women's event medalists
Year	Gold	Silver	Bronze	Ref.
2012	(Finland) Jenni Saarinen	(Lithuania) Aleksandra Golovkina	(Germany) Minami Hanashiro	
2013	(Russia) Evgenia Medvedeva	(Ukraine) Alina Beletskaya	(Ukraine) Valeria Kozinets	
2014	(Belarus) Anastasia Zaitsava	(Ukraine) Maria Gavrilova	(Belarus) Lizaveta Avsiukevich	
2015	(Sweden) Anita Östlund	(Estonia) Kristina Lisovskaja	(Latvia) Anželika Kļujeva	
2016	(South Korea) Lee Hyun-soo	(South Korea) Ko Eun-bi	(South Korea) Jeon Su-been	
2017	(Russia) Anna Tarusina	(Russia) Ksenia Pankova	(Russia) Victoria Vasilieva	
2018	(Russia) Viktoriia Safonova	(France) Alizée Crozet	(Russia) Kamila Sultanmagomedova	
2019	(Ukraine) Anastasiia Shabotova	(Estonia) Niina Petrõkina	(Russia) Kamila Sultanmagomedova	
2020	(Belarus) Varvara Kisel	(Belarus) Milana Ramashova	(Belarus) Lizaveta Balonikava	
2021	(Belarus) Varvara Kisel	(Russia) Sofiia Zakharova	(Belarus) Agata Starykava	

=== Pairs ===
Junior pairs event medalists
Year	Gold	Silver	Bronze	Ref.
2012–17	No junior pairs competitors prior to 2018			
2018	(Russia); Alina Pepeleva; Roman Pleshkov	(Russia); Natalia Khabibullina; Ivan Balchenko	(Russia); Milana Matakaeva; Sergei Bezborodko	
2019–21	No junior pairs competitors since 2018			

=== Ice dance ===
Junior ice dance event medalists
Year	Gold	Silver	Bronze	Ref.
2012	(Belarus); Viktoria Kavaliova; Yurii Bieliaiev	(Ukraine); Daria Korotitskaia; Maksym Spodyriev	(Italy); Sara Ghislandi; Giona Terzo Ortenzi	
2013	(Russia); Anna Yanovskaya; Sergey Mozgov	(Belarus); Viktoria Kavaliova; Yurii Bieliaiev	(Poland); Natalia Kaliszek; Yaroslav Kurbakov	
2014	(Russia); Eva Hachaturian; Andrei Bagin	(Belarus); Eugenia Tkachenka; Yuri Hulitski	(Russia); Sofia Polishchuk; Alexander Vakhnov	
2015	(Russia); Sofia Evdokimova; Egor Bazin	(Belarus); Maria Oleynik; Yuri Hulitski	(Ukraine); Anzhelika Yurchenko; Volodymyr Byelikov	
2016	(Russia); Anastasia Shpilevaya; Grigory Smirnov	(Russia); Arina Ushakova; Maxim Nekrasov	(Russia); Polina Velikanova; Dmitry Kotlov	
2017	(Russia); Sofia Shevchenko; Igor Eremenko	(Israel); Shira Ichilov; Vadim Davidovich	(Russia); Angelina Lazareva; Maksim Prokofev	
2018	(Russia); Angelina Lazareva; Maksim Prokofev	(Russia); Ekaterina Andreeva; Ivan Desyatov	(Belarus); Emiliya Kalehanova; Uladzislau Palhkhouski	
2019	(France); Loïcia Demougeot; Théo le Mercier	(United Kingdom); Sasha Fear; George Waddell	(Russia); Elizaveta Shichina; Gordey Khubulov	
2020	(Cyprus); Angelina Kudryavtseva; Ilia Karankevich	(Russia); Elizaveta Shichina; Gordey Khubulov	(Russia); Vasilisa Grigoreva; Artem Frolov	
2021	(Russia); Alena Kanysheva; Andrei Pylin	(Belarus); Elizaveta Novik; Oleksandr Kukharevskyi	No other competitors	

== Cumulative medal count (senior medalists) ==
=== Men's singles ===
Total number of Ice Star medals in men's singles by nation
Rank	Nation	Gold	Silver	Bronze	Total
1	Russia	4	4	1	9
2	Ukraine	2	0	0	2
3	Italy	1	0	0	1
3	Latvia	1	0	0	1
3	South Korea	1	0	0	1
6	Belarus	0	2	3	5
7	Georgia	0	2	0	2
8	Azerbaijan	0	1	2	3
9	Armenia	0	0	1	1
9	France	0	0	1	1
9	Israel	0	0	1	1
Totals (11 entries)		9	9	9	27

=== Women's singles ===
Total number of Ice Star medals in women's singles by nation
Rank	Nation	Gold	Silver	Bronze	Total
1	Belarus	3	1	1	5
2	Russia	2	4	1	7
3	South Korea	1	1	2	4
4	Estonia	1	0	3	4
5	Azerbaijan	1	0	1	2
5	Ukraine	1	0	1	2
7	Kazakhstan	1	0	0	1
8	Lithuania	0	2	0	2
9	Austria	0	1	0	1
9	France	0	1	0	1
11	Norway	0	0	1	1
Totals (11 entries)		10	10	10	30

=== Pairs ===
Total number of Ice Star medals in pair skating by nation
Rank	Nation	Gold	Silver	Bronze	Total
1	Belarus	2	2	0	4
2	Russia	2	0	2	4
3	Austria	1	0	0	1
4	Germany	0	1	0	1
4	Spain	0	1	0	1
6	Israel	0	0	1	1
Totals (6 entries)		5	4	3	12

=== Ice dance ===
Total number of Ice Star medals in ice dance by nation
Rank	Nation	Gold	Silver	Bronze	Total
1	Russia	4	4	3	11
2	Belarus	2	2	2	6
3	Ukraine	1	1	1	3
4	Italy	1	0	1	2
5	Azerbaijan	1	0	0	1
5	Spain	1	0	0	1
7	Finland	0	1	0	1
7	Poland	0	1	0	1
7	Turkey	0	1	0	1
10	Estonia	0	0	1	1
10	South Korea	0	0	1	1
Totals (11 entries)		10	10	9	29

=== Total medals ===
Total number of Ice Star medals by nation
Rank	Nation	Gold	Silver	Bronze	Total
1	Russia	12	12	7	31
2	Belarus	7	7	6	20
3	Ukraine	4	1	2	7
4	Azerbaijan	2	1	3	6
4	South Korea	2	1	3	6
6	Italy	2	0	1	3
7	Austria	1	1	0	2
7	Spain	1	1	0	2
9	Estonia	1	0	4	5
10	Kazakhstan	1	0	0	1
10	Latvia	1	0	0	1
12	Georgia	0	2	0	2
12	Lithuania	0	2	0	2
14	France	0	1	1	2
15	Finland	0	1	0	1
15	Germany	0	1	0	1
15	Poland	0	1	0	1
15	Turkey	0	1	0	1
19	Israel	0	0	2	2
20	Armenia	0	0	1	1
20	Norway	0	0	1	1
Totals (21 entries)		34	33	31	98
