= 2016 CS Golden Spin of Zagreb =

- Type: ISU Challenger Series
- Date: December 7 – 10
- Season: 2016–17
- Location: Zagreb
- Host: Croatian Skating Federation
- Venue: Dom sportova

Champions
- Men's singles: (Israel) Oleksii Bychenko
- Ladies' singles: (Italy) Carolina Kostner
- Pairs: (Italy) Nicole Della Monica / Matteo Guarise
- Ice dance: (Italy) Charlène Guignard / Marco Fabbri
- Previous: 2015 CS Golden Spin of Zagreb
- Next: 2017 CS Golden Spin of Zagreb

The 2016 CS Golden Spin of Zagreb was the 49th edition of the annual senior-level international figure skating competition held in Zagreb, Croatia. It was held at the Dom sportova in December 2016 as part of the 2016–17 ISU Challenger Series. Medals were awarded in the disciplines of men's singles, ladies' singles, pair skating, and ice dancing.

== Entries ==
Country	Men	Ladies	Pairs	Ice dance
Armenia	Slavik Hayrapetyan			Tina Garabedian / Simon Proulx-Sénécal
Australia	Brendan Kerry	Kailani Craine; Brooklee Han		Kimberley Hew-Low / Timothy McKernan
Belarus		Janina Makeenka	Tatiana Danilova / Mikalai Kamianchuk	
Canada	Keegan Messing; Nicolas Nadeau; Roman Sadovsky			
Croatia	Nicholas Vrdoljak	Tena Čopor	Lana Petranović / Antonio Souza-Kordeyru	
Czech Republic	Petr Kotlařík			Nicole Kuzmich / Alexandr Sinicyn; Cortney Mansour / Michal Češka
France		Julie Froetscher; Laurine Lecavelier		
Germany	Anton Kempf; Franz Streubel		Mari Vartmann / Ruben Blommaert	Kavita Lorenz / Joti Polizoakis; Shari Koch / Christian Nüchtern; Jennifer Urban / Benjamin Steffan
Hong Kong	Wayne Wing Yin Chung	Maisy Hiu Ching Ma		
Israel	Oleksii Bychenko; Daniel Samohin	Aimee Buchanan; Katarina Kulgeyko; Elizaveta Yushchenko	Arina Cherniavskaia / Evgeni Krasnopolski	Adel Tankova / Ronald Zilberberg
Italy	Maurizio Zandron	Carolina Kostner	Nicole Della Monica / Matteo Guarise	Charlène Guignard / Marco Fabbri
Japan			Miu Suzaki / Ryuichi Kihara	
Kazakhstan	Denis Ten			
Latvia				Aurelia Ippolito / Malcolm Jones
Philippines	Michael Christian Martinez			
Poland	Patrick Myzyk			
Russia	Artur Dmitriev Jr. Alexander Petrov; Anton Shulepov	Alexandra Avstriyskaya; Alena Leonova; Elizaveta Tuktamysheva	Kristina Astakhova / Alexei Rogonov; Bogdana Lukashevich / Alexander Stepanov	Sofia Evdokimova / Egor Bazin; Betina Popova / Sergey Mozgov
Serbia		Antonina Dubinina		
Slovenia		Daša Grm		
South Korea			Ji Min-ji / Themistocles Leftheris	
Spain	Javier Raya	Sonia Lafuente		
Sweden	Marcus Björk	Matilda Algotsson		
Switzerland				Victoria Manni / Carlo Röthlisberger
Turkey				Alisa Agafonova / Alper Uçar
Ukraine	Yaroslav Paniot		Renata Ohanesian / Mark Bardei	Oleksandra Nazarova / Maxim Nikitin; Yuliia Zhata / Yan Lukouski
United Kingdom				Ekaterina Fedyshchenko / Lucas Kitteridge
United States	Timothy Dolensky; Vincent Zhou	Karen Chen; Amber Glenn; Gracie Gold	Ashley Cain / Timothy Leduc; Haven Denney / Brandon Frazier; Deanna Stellato / Nathan Bartholomay	Kaitlin Hawayek / Jean-Luc Baker

Added

- Men: Franz Streubel (GER), Michael Christian Martinez (PHI)
- Ladies: Katarina Kulgeyko (ISR), Ashley Wagner (USA), Karen Chen (USA)
- Pairs: Natalja Zabijako / Alexander Enbert (RUS), Deanna Stellato / Nathan Bartholomay (USA)
- Ice dance: Shari Koch / Christian Nüchtern (GER)

Withdrew before starting orders drawn

- Men: Alexei Mialiokhin (BLR), Yakau Zenko (BLR), Micah Tang (TPE), Michal Březina (CZE), Tomi Pulkkinen (FIN), Matthias Versluis (FIN), Kai Xiang Chew (MAS), Adam Rippon (USA)
- Ladies: Anastasia Galustyan (ARM), Amy Lin (TPE), Alina Suponenko (BLR), Katarina Kitarović (CRO), Anni Järvenpää (FIN), Jenni Saarinen (FIN), Netta Schreiber (ISR), Elizabet Tursynbayeva (KAZ), Diāna Ņikitina (LAT), Fleur Maxwell (LUX), Monika Peterka (SLO), Choi Da-bin (KOR), Isabelle Olsson (SWE), Polina Edmunds (USA), Ashley Wagner (USA)
- Pairs: Natalja Zabijako / Alexander Enbert (RUS), Kim Kyu-eun / Alex Kang-chan Kam (KOR), Tarah Kayne / Daniel O'Shea
- Ice dance: Viktoria Kavaliova / Yurii Bieliaiev (BLR), Olesia Karmi / Max Lindholm (FIN), Katharina Müller / Tim Dieck (GER), Jasmine Tessari / Francesco Fioretti (ITA), Alexandra Stepanova / Ivan Bukin (RUS), Lucie Myslivečková / Lukáš Csölley (SVK), Robynne Tweedale / Joseph Buckland (GBR)

== Results ==
=== Men ===
Rank	Name	Nation	Total points	SP		FS	
1	Oleksii Bychenko	Israel	228.08	4	76.18	2	151.90
2	Daniel Samohin	Israel	226.12	1	82.35	7	143.77
3	Keegan Messing	Canada	223.30	2	76.39	4	146.91
4	Alexander Petrov	Russia	222.92	11	66.63	1	156.29
5	Brendan Kerry	Australia	221.94	3	76.36	5	145.58
6	Timothy Dolensky	United States	219.42	5	75.36	6	144.06
7	Roman Sadovsky	Canada	217.94	6	74.66	8	143.38
8	Anton Shulepov	Russia	215.59	10	67.55	3	148.04
9	Artur Dmitriev Jr.	Russia	214.61	9	71.71	9	142.90
10	Javier Raya	Spain	199.99	8	72.46	11	127.53
11	Nicolas Nadeau	Canada	193.75	13	64.00	10	129.75
12	Yaroslav Paniot	Ukraine	186.36	14	61.94	12	124.42
13	Nicholas Vrdoljak	Croatia	172.30	17	55.83	13	116.47
14	Slavik Hayrapetyan	Armenia	171.10	15	61.70	15	109.40
15	Petr Kotlařík	Czech Republic	161.61	20	49.58	14	112.03
16	Anton Kempf	Germany	157.79	18	50.99	16	106.80
17	Patrick Myzyk	Poland	141.26	19	50.95	17	90.31
WD	Denis Ten	Kazakhstan		7	73.35	Withdrew	
WD	Vincent Zhou	United States		12	64.61	Withdrew	
WD	Michael Christian Martinez	Philippines		16	61.27	Withdrew	

=== Ladies ===
Rank	Name	Nation	Total points	SP		FS	
1	Carolina Kostner	Italy	196.23	1	69.95	3	126.28
2	Elizaveta Tuktamysheva	Russia	192.03	5	63.01	1	129.02
3	Alena Leonova	Russia	191.39	3	64.18	2	127.21
4	Amber Glenn	United States	183.60	2	67.93	4	115.67
5	Alexandra Avstriyskaya	Russia	161.77	4	63.66	9	98.11
6	Gracie Gold	United States	159.02	8	54.04	5	104.98
7	Karen Chen	United States	155.63	6	54.60	7	101.03
8	Kailani Craine	Australia	153.04	7	54.05	8	98.99
9	Laurine Lecavelier	France	151.58	11	49.16	6	102.42
10	Daša Grm	Slovenia	140.97	10	50.19	11	90.78
11	Brooklee Han	Australia	139.35	9	53.65	12	85.70
12	Matilda Algotsson	Sweden	138.58	14	43.80	10	94.78
13	Aimee Buchanan	Israel	128.55	17	42.87	13	85.68
14	Antonina Dubinina	Serbia	124.25	16	43.07	14	81.18
15	Katarina Kulgeyko	Israel	122.01	12	45.69	15	76.32
16	Sonia Lafuente	Spain	116.42	15	43.51	16	72.91
17	Elizaveta Yushchenko	Israel	115.79	13	45.27	18	70.52
18	Janina Makeenka	Belarus	111.57	19	39.80	17	71.77
19	Julie Froetscher	France	106.79	18	42.63	19	64.16

=== Pairs ===
Rank	Name	Nation	Total points	SP		FS	
1	Nicole Della Monica / Matteo Guarise	Italy	180.60	1	64.54	3	116.06
2	Kristina Astakhova / Alexei Rogonov	Russia	180.44	2	63.82	1	116.62
3	Ashley Cain / Timothy Leduc	United States	172.18	4	56.60	2	115.58
4	Haven Denney / Brandon Frazier	United States	161.63	3	57.40	4	104.23
5	Lana Petranović / Antonio Souza-Kordeyru	Croatia	153.93	5	53.14	6	100.62
6	Deanna Stellato / Nathan Bartholomay	United States	150.76	8	48.14	5	102.62
7	Ji Min-ji / Themistocles Leftheris	South Korea	143.40	7	48.92	7	94.48
8	Tatiana Danilova / Mikalai Kamianchuk	Belarus	138.94	9	46.58	8	92.36
9	Bogdana Lukashevich / Alexander Stepanov	Russia	136.13	6	53.04	9	83.09
10	Renata Ohanesian / Mark Bardei	Ukraine	124.48	10	43.14	10	81.34
WD	Arina Cherniavskaia / Evgeni Krasnopolski	Israel		11	41.86	Withdrew	
WD	Mari Vartmann / Ruben Blommaert	Germany	Withdrew				

=== Ice dancing ===
Rank	Name	Nation	Total points	SP		FS	
1	Charlène Guignard / Marco Fabbri	Italy	180.30	1	72.46	1	107.84
2	Kaitlin Hawayek / Jean-Luc Baker	United States	177.36	2	70.12	2	107.24
3	Alisa Agafonova / Alper Uçar	Turkey	159.02	3	63.48	3	95.54
4	Kavita Lorenz / Joti Polizoakis	Germany	155.34	5	60.12	4	95.22
5	Betina Popova / Sergey Mozgov	Russia	155.22	4	60.70	5	94.52
6	Oleksandra Nazarova / Maxim Nikitin	Ukraine	148.66	9	56.20	6	92.46
7	Cortney Mansour / Michal Češka	Czech Republic	148.50	6	58.60	7	89.90
8	Shari Koch / Christian Nüchtern	Germany	144.74	7	57.08	8	87.66
9	Sofia Evdokimova / Egor Bazin	Russia	142.96	8	56.80	10	86.16
10	Jennifer Urban / Benjamin Steffan	Germany	139.72	10	54.94	11	84.78
11	Tina Garabedian / Simon Proulx-Sénécal	Armenia	139.28	11	51.74	9	87.54
12	Nicole Kuzmich / Alexandr Sinicyn	Czech Republic	129.38	13	46.16	12	83.22
13	Victoria Manni / Carlo Röthlisberger	Switzerland	125.62	12	51.52	14	74.10
14	Yuliia Zhata / Yan Lukouski	Ukraine	114.22	16	39.96	13	74.26
15	Kimberley Hew-Low / Timothy McKernan	Australia	112.46	14	44.44	16	68.02
16	Adel Tankova / Ronald Zilberberg	Israel	110.54	15	41.36	15	69.18
17	Aurelia Ippolito / Malcolm Jones	Latvia	97.76	17	38.68	17	59.08
WD	Ekaterina Fedyshchenko / Lucas Kitteridge	United Kingdom	Withdrew				
