= Pavel Ignatenko =

Belarusian figure skater

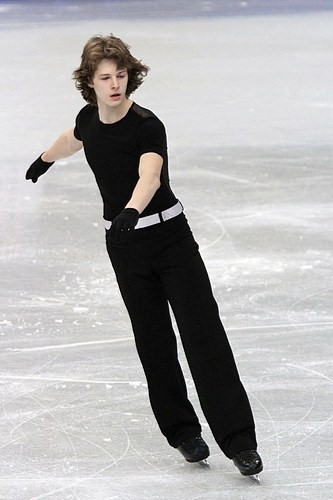
- Ignatenko in 2012

Personal information
- Born: 8 July 1995 (age 31) Mogilev, Belarus
- Height: 1.69 m (5 ft 6 1/2 in)

Figure skating career
- Country: Belarus
- Coach: Anna Tsareva
- Skating club: Sambo 70
- Began skating: 2000

Pavel Alyaksandravich Ignatenko (born 8 July 1995) is a Belarusian figure skater. A senior national champion, he has qualified for the free skate at three European and two World Junior Championships. His best result, 13th, came at the 2013 European Championships in Zagreb, Croatia.

== Programs ==
Season	Short program	Free skating
2014–15	Skyfall; James Bond Theme	Radioactive by William Joseph; Edit by Ants; Lost Without You; Street Violin by Josh Vietti
2013–14	Ragtime Vabank by Henryk Kuzniak, Vabank Dixieland Band	The Man in the Iron Mask by Nick Glennie-Smith
2012–13	Ragtime Vabank by Henryk Kuzniak, Vabank Dixieland Band	Les Bateaux (Emmenez-moi) by Jean Claudric; Le Repos d'Alexandre by Vladimir Cosma
2011–12	Crazy	Malaguena by Ernesto Lecuona (modern arrangement)

== Competitive highlights ==
CS: Challenger Series; JGP: Junior Grand Prix

International
Event	07–08	08–09	09–10	10–11	11–12	12–13	13–14	14–15	15–16
Worlds						WD		28th	
Europeans						13th	20th	21st	
CS Golden Spin								15th	
CS Ice Challenge								6th	
CS Mordovian									6th
CS Nepela Trophy									7th
CS Tallinn Trophy									6th
Cup of Nice						19th			
DS Cup							4th		
Ice Star							3rd		
Nebelhorn Trophy							17th		
Seibt Memorial							6th		
Universiade							15th		
International: Junior
Junior Worlds					30th	14th	20th		
JGP Belarus			20th						
JGP Croatia						11th		19th	
JGP Estonia					10th		8th	22nd	
JGP Germany				21st					
JGP Latvia					8th		8th		
JGP Turkey						7th			
Ice Star						2nd J			
NRW Trophy					5th J	4th J			
National
Belarusian	5th	5th	2nd		4th	1st	1st	1st	2nd
J = Junior level; WD = Withdrew
