= The Chorus (soundtrack) =

Soundtrack album by Bruno Coulais
- Released: 3 May 2004
- Genre: Soundtrack
- Length: 38:30
- Labels: Warner Bros. Records (2004); Nonesuch Records (2005); Varèse Sarabande (2012)

Bruno Coulais chronology
Agents secrets (2003)	The Chorus (2004)	Let's Be Friends (2004)

Singles from The Chorus
- 1. "Vois Sur Ton Chemin" Released: 2004

Professional ratings
Review scores
Source	Rating
SoundtrackNet	(not rated) Link

The Chorus is the original soundtrack of the 2004 film The Chorus (original title: Les choristes) starring Gérard Jugnot, François Berléand, Kad Merad and Jean-Baptiste Maunier. The original score was composed by Bruno Coulais and performed by Les Petits Chanteurs de Saint-Marc and the Bulgarian Symphony Orchestra.

The album won the César Award for Best Music Written for a Film. It was also nominated for the BAFTA Award for Best Film Music, (but lost to the score of Los Diarios de Motocicleta). The song "Look To Your Path" (original title: "Vois Sur Ton Chemin") was nominated for an Academy Award but ultimately lost to "Al otro lado del río" from Los Diarios de Motocicleta.

== Track listing ==
1. Les Choristes 1:32
2. In Memoriam 3:25
3. L'arrivée À L'école 1:32
4. Pépinot 1:50
5. Vois Sur Ton Chemin 2:19 (nominated for the Academy Award for Best Original Song)
6. Les Partitions 1:03
7. Caresse Sur L'océan 2:10
8. Lueur D'été 2:02
9. Cerf-Volant 0:58
10. Sous La Pluie 1:05
11. Compère Guilleri 0:35
12. La Désillusion 1:22
13. La Nuit 2:21
14. L'incendie 1:23
15. L'évocation 1:45
16. Les Avions En Papier 1:28
17. Action Réaction 1:45
18. Seuls 1:53
19. Morhange 1:57
20. In Mémoriam A Cappella 3:19
21. Nous Sommes De Fond De L'étang 2:46

Total album time: 38:30

== Certifications ==
Region	Certification	Certified units/sales
Belgium (BRMA)	Gold	25,000^{*}
France (SNEP)	Diamond	1,600,000
Germany (BVMI)	Gold	100,000^{^}
Switzerland (IFPI Switzerland)	Gold	20,000^{^}
^{*} Sales figures based on certification alone.^{^} Shipments figures based on certification alone.
