= Eric Radford =

Canadian pair skater (born 1985)

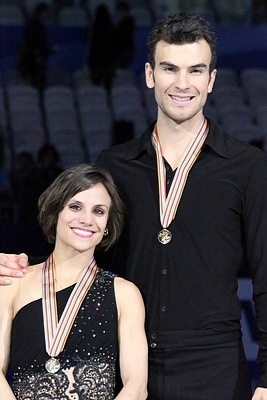
- Duhamel and Radford in 2015

Personal information
- Born: January 27, 1985 (age 41) Winnipeg, Manitoba, Canada
- Home town: Montreal, Quebec, Canada
- Height: 1.88 m (6 ft 2 in)

Figure skating career
- Country: Canada
- Discipline: Pair skating (2003–18, 2021–22); Men's singles (2002–05)
- Partner: Vanessa James (2021–22); Meagan Duhamel (2010–18); Anne-Marie Giroux (2009–10); Rachel Kirkland (2005–09); Sarah Burke (2003–05)
- Began skating: 1993
- Retired: July 11, 2022
- Highest WS: 1st (2016–17, 2015–16 & 2014–15)
Event	Gold medal – first place	Silver medal – second place	Bronze medal – third place
Olympic Games	1	1	1
World Championships	2	0	3
Four Continents Championships	2	2	0
Grand Prix Final	1	1	2
Canadian Championships	7	1	0
World Team Trophy	0	1	1
Medal list
Olympic Games
Gold medal – first place	2018 Pyeongchang	Team
Silver medal – second place	2014 Sochi	Team
Bronze medal – third place	2018 Pyeongchang	Pairs
World Championships
Gold medal – first place	2015 Shanghai	Pairs
Gold medal – first place	2016 Boston	Pairs
Bronze medal – third place	2013 London	Pairs
Bronze medal – third place	2014 Saitama	Pairs
Bronze medal – third place	2022 Montpellier	Pairs
Four Continents Championships
Gold medal – first place	2013 Osaka	Pairs
Gold medal – first place	2015 Seoul	Pairs
Silver medal – second place	2011 Taipei	Pairs
Silver medal – second place	2017 Gangneung	Pairs
Grand Prix Final
Gold medal – first place	2014–15 Barcelona	Pairs
Silver medal – second place	2015–16 Barcelona	Pairs
Bronze medal – third place	2016–17 Marseille	Pairs
Bronze medal – third place	2017–18 Nagoya	Pairs
Canadian Championships
Gold medal – first place	2012 Moncton	Pairs
Gold medal – first place	2013 Mississauga	Pairs
Gold medal – first place	2014 Ottawa	Pairs
Gold medal – first place	2015 Kingston	Pairs
Gold medal – first place	2016 Halifax	Pairs
Gold medal – first place	2017 Ottawa	Pairs
Gold medal – first place	2018 Vancouver	Pairs
Silver medal – second place	2011 Victoria	Pairs
World Team Trophy
Silver medal – second place	2013 Tokyo	Team
Bronze medal – third place	2012 Tokyo	Team

Eric Radford (born January 27, 1985) is a Canadian retired pair skater. With former partner Meagan Duhamel, he is a two-time world champion (2015, 2016), a 2018 Olympic gold medallist in the team event, a 2014 Olympic silver medallist in the team event, a 2018 Olympic bronze medallist in the pairs event, a two-time Four Continents champion (2013, 2015), the 2014–15 Grand Prix Final champion, and a seven-time Canadian national champion (2012–18). He is the first openly gay man to have won a gold medal at any Winter Olympics.

During the 2014 Olympics, Duhamel and Radford became the first pair to land a side-by-side triple Lutz jump at any Winter Olympic competition. At the 2018 Winter Olympics, 33-year-old Radford won a gold medal as part of the figure skating team event, becoming one of the oldest Olympic champions in figure skating. Three days later, during the individual pairs free skate, Duhamel and Radford became the first team to complete a quadruple throw jump at any Winter Olympic competition when she landed their throw quadruple Salchow.

In April 2021, Radford announced a return to competition with new partner Vanessa James. They represented Canada at the 2022 Winter Olympics and were the bronze medalists at the 2022 World Championships. Following this, Radford retired for a second time.

== Early and personal life ==
Radford was born in Winnipeg, Manitoba, and raised in Balmertown, Ontario. His parents are Rick, a mine inspector, and Valerie, a retired schoolteacher. He moved to Kenora at age 14, to Winnipeg and Montreal at 15, and to Toronto at 16 to pursue his skating ambitions. He studied music at York University and holds a Grade 9 Royal Conservatory of Music certificate. He plays piano and writes and composes music, and registered as a member of the Society of Composers, Authors and Music Publishers of Canada in 2014. During the summer of 2016, Radford composed the 2016–17 free skate music for fellow Canadian skater and three-time world champion Patrick Chan.

In December 2014, Radford publicly came out as gay in an interview with the LGBT publication Outsports. In doing so, he became the first competitive figure skater ever to come out at the height of his career, rather than waiting until he was near or past retirement; at the 2015 World Figure Skating Championships, Radford and Duhamel's gold medal win in pairs skating made him the first openly gay figure skater ever to win a medal at that competition. He is an ambassador for the Canadian Olympic Committee's #OneTeam program to combat homophobia in sports.

Radford became engaged to his boyfriend, Spanish ice dancer Luis Fenero, on June 10, 2017. They wed on July 12, 2019, at noon.

In addition to competing, Radford also coaches and composes performance music for skating.

In June 2018, the municipality of Red Lake, which includes Radford's home community of Balmertown, named the street he grew up on Eric Radford Way in his honour. On the same day, Red Lake held its second-ever Pride parade, with Radford walking along with then fiancé and current husband Luis Fenero, family and friends.

== Skating career ==
=== Early career ===
Radford began skating when he was eight years old, after being inspired by watching Nancy Kerrigan skate in the 1992 Winter Olympics. He competed with Sarah Burke on the ISU Junior Grand Prix series in 2003 in the Czech Republic and 2004 in Hungary, placing 6th and 5th respectively. He also competed in single skating. At the 2005 Canadian Championships, he became trapped in an elevator just before he was scheduled to skate in the men's qualifying round but eventually escaped and was able to compete.

Radford teamed up with Rachel Kirkland in 2005. They were coached by Brian Orser in Toronto and part-time by Ingo Steuer in Chemnitz, Germany. They competed at the 2007 Canadian Championships, where they finished 5th. After finishing 7th at the 2009 Canadian Championships, they ended their partnership.

Radford moved back to Montreal in 2009. He teamed up with Anne-Marie Giroux and finished 8th at the 2010 Canadian Championships.

=== 2010–2011 season: First season with Duhamel ===
At a coach's suggestion, Radford had a tryout with Meagan Duhamel, and they decided to compete together. They won a silver medal at the 2011 Canadian Championships and were assigned to the 2011 Four Continents Championships and the 2011 World Championships. At Four Continents, the pair won a silver medal.

During the short program at the 2011 World Championships, Radford's nose was broken when Duhamel's elbow hit him on the descent from a triple twist, their first element – she opened up too early. Seeing the blood, Duhamel suggested they stop, but he decided to continue, and they finished the program without a pause. Duhamel had not done a triple twist since 2005, and the new pair only began performing it before the Canadian Championships.

=== 2011–2012 season: First national title ===
Duhamel/Radford won bronze medals at their Grand Prix events, the 2011 Skate Canada and 2011 Trophée Eric Bompard. They won their first national title and finished 5th at the 2012 World Championships.

=== 2012–2013 season: World bronze, Four Continents gold ===
The following season, Duhamel/Radford won silver at their Grand Prix events, the 2012 Skate Canada International and 2012 Trophée Eric Bompard. They then won their second national title and their first Four Continents title. Duhamel/Radford stepped onto the World podium for the first time at the 2013 World Championships in London, Ontario, where they won the bronze medal.

=== 2013–2014 season: Sochi Olympics ===
Duhamel/Radford skated their short program to music composed by Radford as a tribute to his late coach Paul Wirtz. During the 2014 Olympics, Duhamel and Radford became the first pair to land a side-by-side triple Lutz at any Winter Olympic competition. After finishing seventh at the 2014 Winter Olympics in Sochi, they returned to the podium at the 2014 World Championships, where they scored personal bests in both the short program and the free skate on their way to a second bronze medal.

=== 2014–2015 season: First World title ===
Duhamel/Radford practiced a quad throw Salchow during the summer of 2014. At the inaugural 2014 Autumn Classic International held in Barrie, Ontario, they successfully executed the quad throw Salchow and won the event. They were chosen to compete at the 2014 Skate Canada International and 2014 NHK Trophy in the 2014–15 Grand Prix season. They won both events and eventually won their first Grand Prix Final title. At the Grand Prix Final, they improved their personal best scores in the free skating and combined total. Duhamel/Radford continued their first-place streak by winning their fourth Canadian title and their second Four Continents title. In March 2015, they won gold in pairs at the 2015 World Championships, capping a perfect season in which they won gold at every international event where they competed.

=== 2015–2016 season: Second World title ===
Duhamel/Radford began their season by winning the 2015 Skate Canada Autumn Classic. Turning to the Grand Prix series, they won gold medals at the 2015 Skate Canada International and 2015 NHK Trophy. In December, they took silver behind Stolbova/Klimov at the Grand Prix Final in Barcelona.

In January 2016, Duhamel/Radford won their fifth consecutive national title at the Canadian Championships. They withdrew from the 2016 Four Continents Championships in Taipei due to Duhamel's illness. In April, they competed at the 2016 World Championships in Boston, placing second in the short and first in the free. They were awarded the gold medal ahead of Sui/Han and Savchenko/Massot, who took silver and bronze, respectively.

=== 2016–2017 season ===
Duhamel/Radford received the bronze medal at the Grand Prix Final in December 2016 before winning their sixth consecutive national title. In January 2017. They took the silver medal behind Sui/Han in February at the 2017 Four Continents Championships. At the 2017 World Championships, held in March in Helsinki, Finland, Radford had trouble training due to a muscle spasm in his hip. The pair finished 7th at the competition.

=== 2017–2018 season: Pyeongchang Olympics and retirement ===
Duhamel/Radford began their final competitive season with silver at the 2017 CS Autumn Classic. Switching to the Grand Prix series, the pair took gold at the 2017 Skate Canada International after ranking second in the short program and first in the free skate. At the 2017 Skate America, they received the bronze medal after ranking first in the short and third in the free. Their scores at their two Grand Prix events qualified the pair to compete at the 2017–18 Grand Prix Final, held in December in Nagoya, Japan. They climbed from fifth after the short to obtain the bronze medal at the final.

In January, Duhamel/Radford won their seventh consecutive Canadian pairs' title, an all-time record, at the 2018 Canadian National Championships. In February, they represented Canada at their second Winter Olympics, which took place in PyeongChang, South Korea. Competing in the team event, they placed second in the short program and first in the free skate, contributing to Canada's team gold medal. At 32 and 33 years old, respectively, they were among the oldest Olympic champions in figure skating. They were the only top pair to skate both segments of the team competition, as individual pairs was to take place first of the individual figure skating events. In the individual event, Duhamel/Radford ranked third in the short program and second in the free skate, finishing in third place and earning the bronze medal. They became the first pair to complete a throw quad at any Winter Olympic competition.

On April 25, the two announced their retirement from competition. Radford said that he would consider coaching and choreography.

=== Choreography and Battle of the Blades ===
In addition to participating with Duhamel in Stars on Ice tours as well as the "Thank You Canada" tour organized by Tessa Virtue and Scott Moir, Radford competed for two seasons on the CBC series Battle of the Blades, which featured figure skaters partnered with ice hockey players to create figure skating programs. In the fifth season, he was partnered with former Team USA player Amanda Kessel, and they were the first team eliminated from the competition. In the sixth season, he was partnered with former Team Canada player Jennifer Botterill. They were the third team eliminated.

Radford worked as a choreographer for several Canadian skaters, notably the pair team Evelyn Walsh and Trennt Michaud, for whom he choreographed two free programs.

In March 2019, Radford was elected to the ISU Athletes Commission for a term extending until 2023. He was named to serve as vice chair.

=== 2021–2022 season: James partnership, Beijing Olympics, World bronze ===
In April 2021, rumours began to circulate that Radford was training with fellow Battle of the Blades contestant Vanessa James, a skater of British, Canadian, and French citizenship who had previously competed at the elite level for France for most of her career. On April 20, it was reported that France had released James to compete for another country. The following day, Skate Canada officially announced that James and Radford would compete as a pair team in the new season, to be coached by Julie Marcotte and Ian Connolly. Radford said of his return to competition, "I know that a lot of people are probably going to ask why. And for me, it's more of a question of why not?" Duhamel expressed disappointment that Radford only belatedly informed her of his plans not to continue performing in ice shows with her.

James/Radford made their competitive debut at the 2021 CS Autumn Classic International, where they won the silver medal. James struggled on her jumping elements at the event. At the 2021 CS Finlandia Trophy, they were third in the short program, but a seventh-place free skate dropped them to fifth overall. Radford called it "a disappointment because we've been skating better than that in practice."

James/Radford competed on the Grand Prix at the 2021 Skate Canada International, where they placed fourth. James said afterwards, "we are definitely getting stronger each time we go out there. We are trying not to have expectations but just goals. There is a lot of pressure on the outside, but we are trying to stay in our bubble." At their second Grand Prix event, the 2021 Internationaux de France, the pair skated a clean short program to clear 70 points in that segment for the first time. In the free skate, they landed all of their jumps and throws for the first time competitively with just a small two-foot landing on one throw, but aborted one of their lifts and lost their pair spin, as a result of which they dropped to fourth place. Despite this, James said it was "the most confident we have felt since we started skating together. We lost about 13 points on easy elements today that we usually never miss, but we are proud that we got the hard ones done."

James and Radford both tested positive for COVID-19 and quarantined for a period before the 2022 Canadian Championships. They opted to compete initially, placing fourth in the short program, and then withdrew, citing a need to "continue their training and preparation for the remainder of the competitive season." Despite the withdrawal, they were named to the Canadian Olympic team over national silver medalists Walsh/Michaud. This was controversial, with many arguing Walsh/Michaud had earned the spot.

Competing at the 2022 Winter Olympics, James/Radford were the Canadian entries in the pairs free skate segment of the Olympic team event. A day before competing, the two had had a collision in practice with Italy's Matteo Guarise but were still able to perform. They placed fourth in the segment, while the Canadian team finished fourth overall. In the pairs event, James doubled her attempt at a triple toe loop, and they had movement on the side-by-side spins, resulting in them placing twelfth in the segment. James fell on their throw triple flip in the free skate. They placed twelfth in that segment as well, finishing twelfth overall. She said, "the flip didn't go, but we're still a very new couple. To go out there and skate our hearts out is a huge accomplishment. And to have enjoyed it and trust our training, ourselves, and each other is huge within 11 months."

Days after the Olympics concluded, Vladimir Putin ordered an invasion of Ukraine, as a result of which the International Skating Union banned all Russian and Belarusian skaters from competing at the 2022 World Championships. As well, the Chinese Skating Association opted not to send athletes to compete in Montpellier. As those countries' athletes comprised the entirety of the top five pairs at the Olympics, this greatly impacted the field. James/Radford placed fifth in the short program, with James putting her free foot down on their throw and Radford putting a hand down on his triple toe jump. In the free skate, they delivered a strong performance, but Radford underrotated a double toe loop and unexpectedly placed second in the segment, rising to the bronze medal position overall. This was the first World medal for Canada in pairs since Duhamel/Radford's title defence six years before. Radford called the season "one of the best years of my life." Both said they were undecided about competing further.

On July 11, 2022, James and Radford announced they would retire from competitive skating. On the occasion, Radford noted, "almost 30 years ago, at the age of 8, I started skating. Skating has shaped my life in many ways and given me some of my most amazing memories. I find it funny and unexpected to be writing about ending my competitive career for a second time, but like last time, there are many people who supported, pushed and inspired me along this journey that I am so grateful for."

== Programs ==
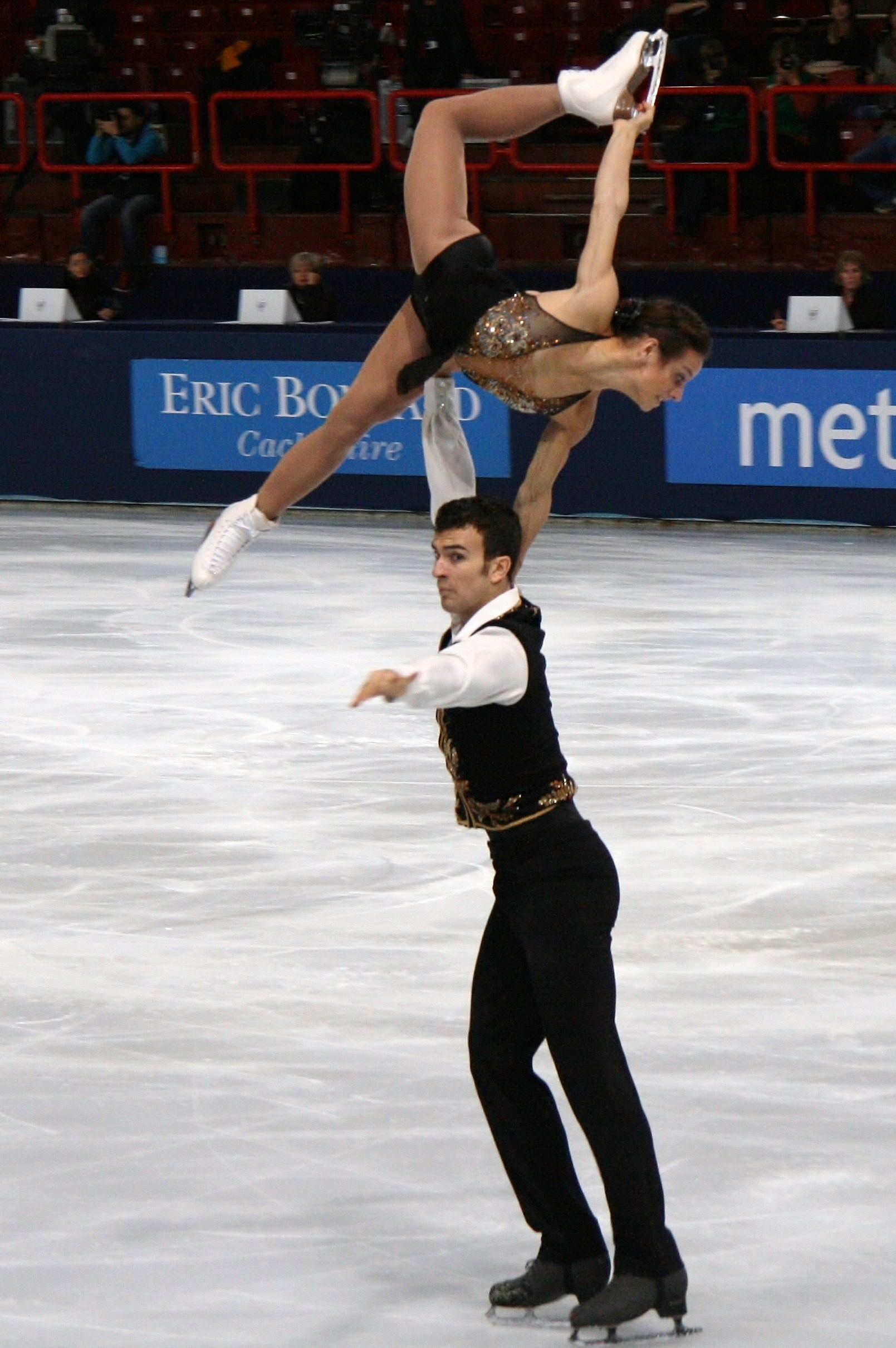
Duhamel and Radford in 2011

=== With James ===
Season	Short program	Free skating	Exhibition
2021–2022	Shiny Happy People by Reuben and the Dark & AG; Daydreamers by Karl Hugo choreo. by Guillaume Cizeron & Samuel Chouinard; First Time by Josef Salvat choreo. by Guillaume Cizeron & Samuel Chouinard	Falling by Harry Styles; Maelstrom by Karl Hugo choreo. by Julie Marcotte	Répondez-moi by Gjon's Tears; Meaningless by Charlotte Cardin

=== With Duhamel ===
Season	Short program	Free skating	Exhibition
2017–2018	With or Without You by U2 performed by April Meservy choreo. by John Kerr, Julie Marcotte	Hometown Glory by Adele choreo. by Julie Marcotte; Neutron Star Collision by Muse; I Belong to You (from "Samson and Delilah") performed by Muse; Uprising by Muse choreo. by Julie Marcotte	Be Mine by Ofenbach choreo. by Jeffrey Buttle; Sign of the Times by Harry Styles; Piano Man by Billy Joel; "Selene, la dea della luna" - Chandelier by Sia; "Apollo and Daphne, a Love Chase"; Heroes by David Bowie and Brian Eno performed by Peter Gabriel
2016–2017	Killer by Adamski, Seal performed by Seal choreo. by Julie Marcotte	Non, je ne regrette rien by Charles Dumont, Michel Vaucaire performed by Patricia Kaas choreo. by Julie Marcotte	Heroes by David Bowie and Brian Eno; Piano Man by Billy Joel
2015–2016	Your Song (from Moulin Rouge!) by Elton John performed by Ewan McGregor choreo. by Julie Marcotte	Hometown Glory by Adele choreo. by Julie Marcotte	Piano Man by Billy Joel; Believe by Mumford & Sons; Smile (from Modern Times) performed by Nat King Cole
2014–2015	Un peu plus haut by Ginette Reno choreo. by Julie Marcotte	Neutron Star Collision by Muse; I Belong to You (from "Samson and Delilah") performed by Muse; Uprising by Muse choreo. by Julie Marcotte	One by Mary J. Blige and U2 choreo. by Julie Marcotte; Say Something by A Great Big World
2013–2014	Tribute original composition by Eric Radford arranged by Louis Babin choreo. by Julie Marcotte	Alice in Wonderland by Danny Elfman; Everlasting by Two Steps from Hell choreo. by Julie Marcotte	True Colors by Artists Against Bullying; Say Something by A Great Big World
2012–2013	La bohème performed by Roby Lakatos; La bohéme performed by Paul McCoy; La bohéme performed by Bruno Walker, Jean Kikteff choreo. by Julie Marcotte	Angel by Philippe Rombi choreo. by Julie Marcotte	Ho Hey by The Lumineers; Hometown Glory by Adele
2011–2012	Concierto de Aranjuez by Joaquín Rodrigo choreo. by Julie Marcotte	Viva la Vida by Coldplay; Yellow by Coldplay choreo. by Julie Marcotte	When She Loved Me performed by Josh Young; Don't Stop Believin' (from Glee) performed by Lea Michele and Cory Monteith
2010–2011	Concerto pour une Voix by Saint-Preux choreo. by Julie Marcotte	The Train by Konstantin Krimets; Meet Joe Black by Thomas Newman choreo. by Julie Marcotte	Don't Stop Believin' (from Glee) performed by Lea Michele and Cory Monteith

=== With Kirkland ===
Season	Short program	Free skating
2008–2009	Don Juan DeMarco by Michael Kamen	Stolen by Dashboard Confessional; Dare You to Move by Switchfoot

=== With Burke ===
Season	Short program	Free skating
2003–2004	Tribute by Yanni	Spartacus by Aram Khachaturian

== Competitive highlights ==
GP: Grand Prix; CS: Challenger Series; JGP: Junior Grand Prix

=== With James ===
International
Event	21–22
Olympics	12th
Worlds	3rd
GP France	4th
GP Skate Canada	4th
CS Autumn Classic	2nd
CS Finlandia Trophy	5th
CS Golden Spin	4th
National
Canadian Champ.	WD
Team events
Olympics	4th T 4th P
TBD = Assigned, WD = Withdrew

=== Pair skating with Meagan Duhamel ===
Competition placements at senior level
Season	2010–11	2011–12	2012–13	2013–14	2014–15	2015–16	2016–17	2017–18
Winter Olympics				7th				3rd
Winter Olympics (Team event)				2nd				1st
World Championships	7th	5th	3rd	3rd	1st	1st	7th	WD
Four Continents Championships	2nd	4th	1st		1st	WD	2nd	
Grand Prix Final		5th	4th	5th	1st	2nd	3rd	3rd
Canadian Championships	2nd	1st	1st	1st	1st	1st	1st	1st
GP NHK Trophy					1st	1st	1st	
GP Skate America								3rd
GP Skate Canada	5th	3rd	2nd	3rd	1st	1st	1st	1st
GP Trophée Éric Bompard		3rd	2nd	2nd				
CS Autumn Classic					1st	1st		2nd
CS Finlandia Trophy							1st	
Nebelhorn Trophy	3rd							
Team Challenge Cup						1st (1st)		
World Team Trophy		3rd (2nd)	2nd (2nd)		4th (2nd)			

=== With Giroux ===
National
Event	2009–10
Canadian Champ.	8th

=== With Kirkland ===
International
Event	2005–06	2006–07	2007–08	2008–09
GP Skate Canada				6th
Nebelhorn Trophy			4th	7th
National
Canadian Champ.	2nd J	5th	5th	7th
German Champ.				G
J = Junior level; G = Participated as guest

=== With Burke ===
International
Event	2003–04	2004–05
JGP Czech Republic	6th	
JGP Hungary		5th
National
Canadian Champ.		4th J
J = Junior level

=== Single skating ===
International
Event	2002–03	2003–04	2004–05
JGP Canada	13th		
JGP Czech Republic		11th	
Copenhagen Trophy		3rd J	
Triglav Trophy	5th J		
National
Canadian Champ.	4th J	1st J	15th
J = Junior level

== Detailed results ==
- Small medals for the short program and free skating are only awarded at ISU Championships.
- Medals at team events are awarded for the team results only. Individual placements at team events are listed in parentheses.

=== Pair skating with Vanessa James ===
ISU personal best scores in the +5/-5 GOE System
Segment	Type	Score	Event
Total	TSS	197.32	2022 World Championships
Short program	TSS	71.84	2021 Internationaux de France
Short program	TES	38.31	2021 Internationaux de France
Short program	PCS	33.57	2021 CS Finlandia Trophy
Free skating	TSS	130.83	2021 CS Golden Spin of Zagreb
Free skating	TES	66.11	2021 CS Golden Spin of Zagreb
Free skating	PCS	69.21	2021 Internationaux de France

Results in the 2021–22 season
Date	Event	SP		FS		Total	
Date	Event	P	Score	P	Score	P	Score
Sep 16–18, 2021	(Canada) 2021 CS Autumn Classic International	2	68.29	2	115.72	2	184.01
Oct 7–10, 2021	(Finland) 2021 CS Finlandia Trophy	3	67.55	7	123.03	5	190.58
Oct 29–31, 2021	2021 Skate Canada International	5	65.02	4	122.90	4	187.92
Nov 19–21, 2021	2021 Internationaux de France	3	71.84	4	124.50	4	196.34
Dec 7–11, 2021	(Croatia) 2021 CS Golden Spin of Zagreb	9	56.74	1	130.83	4	187.57
Jan 6–12, 2022	(Canada) 2022 Canadian Championships	4	63.33	–	–	–	WD
Feb 4–7, 2022	(China) 2022 Winter Olympics (Team event)	–	–	4	130.07	4	–
Feb 18–19, 2022	(China) 2022 Winter Olympics	12	63.03	12	117.96	12	180.99
Mar 21–27, 2022	(France) 2022 World Championships	5	66.54	2	130.78	3	197.32

=== Pair skating with Meagan Duhamel ===
ISU personal best scores in the +3/-3 GOE System
Segment	Type	Score	Event
Total	TSS	231.99	2016 World Championships
Short program	TSS	78.39	2016 Skate Canada International
Short program	TES	43.90	2016 Skate Canada International
Short program	PCS	36.25	2016 World Championships
Free skating	TSS	153.81	2016 World Championships
Free skating	TES	79.46	2016 World Championships
Free skating	PCS	74.35	2016 World Championships

Results in the 2010–11 season
Date	Event	SP		FS		Total	
Date	Event	P	Score	P	Score	P	Score
Sep 23–26, 2010	(Germany) 2010 Nebelhorn Trophy	3	51.81	3	95.63	3	147.44
Oct 28–31, 2010	2010 Skate Canada International	4	54.80	4	103.73	5	158.53
Jan 17–23, 2011	(Canada) 2011 Canadian Championships	4	57.71	2	113.63	2	171.34
Jan 24–30, 2011	(Taiwan) 2011 Four Continents Championships	3	59.92	2	121.87	2	181.79
Apr 27 – May 1, 2011	(Russia) 2011 World Championships	7	58.83	7	114.20	7	173.03

Results in the 2011–12 season
Date	Event	SP		FS		Total	
Date	Event	P	Score	P	Score	P	Score
Oct 27–30, 2011	2011 Skate Canada International	2	62.37	3	112.47	3	174.84
Nov 17–20, 2011	(France) 2011 Trophée Éric Bompard	2	61.06	3	115.56	3	176.62
Dec 8–11, 2011	(Canada) 2011–12 Grand Prix Final	5	61.04	5	109.39	5	170.43
Jan 16–22, 2012	(Canada) 2012 Canadian Championships	1	60.92	1	129.19	1	190.11
Feb 7–12, 2012	(United States) 2012 Four Continents Championships	8	57.53	4	114.23	4	171.76
Mar 26 – Apr 1, 2012	(France) 2012 World Championships	5	63.69	5	121.72	5	185.41
Apr 19–22, 2012	(Japan) 2012 World Team Trophy	4	59.27	2	112.64	3	–

Results in the 2012–13 season
Date	Event	SP		FS		Total	
Date	Event	P	Score	P	Score	P	Score
Oct 26–28, 2012	2012 Skate Canada International	2	64.49	2	126.00	2	190.49
Nov 15–18, 2012	(France) 2012 Trophée Éric Bompard	2	62.28	1	124.43	2	186.71
Dec 6–9, 2012	(Russia) 2012–13 Grand Prix Final	4	64.20	4	122.89	4	187.09
Jan 13–20, 2013	(Canada) 2013 Canadian Championships	1	69.08	1	137.55	1	206.63
Feb 6–11, 2013	(Japan) 2013 Four Continents Championships	1	70.44	2	128.74	1	199.18
Mar 13–15, 2013	(Canada) 2013 World Championships	2	73.61	3	130.95	3	204.56
Apr 11–14, 2013	(Japan) 2013 World Team Trophy	2	69.94	2	121.21	2	–

Results in the 2013–14 season
Date	Event	SP		FS		Total	
Date	Event	P	Score	P	Score	P	Score
Oct 24–27, 2013	2013 Skate Canada International	1	69.57	3	121.05	3	190.62
Nov 15–17, 2013	(France) 2013 Trophée Éric Bompard	2	66.07	2	124.82	2	190.89
Dec 5–8, 2013	(Japan) 2013–14 Grand Prix Final	4	73.07	6	120.31	5	193.38
Jan 9–15, 2014	(Canada) 2014 Canadian Championships	1	75.80	1	137.82	1	213.62
Feb 6–22, 2014	(Russia) 2014 Winter Olympics (Team event)	2	73.10	–	–	2	–
Feb 6–22, 2014	(Russia) 2014 Winter Olympics	5	72.21	7	127.32	7	199.53
Mar 24–30, 2014	(Japan) 2014 World Championships	2	77.01	4	133.83	3	210.84

Results in the 2014–15 season
Date	Event	SP		FS		Total	
Date	Event	P	Score	P	Score	P	Score
Oct 15–16, 2014	(Canada) 2014 CS Autumn Classic International	1	68.92	1	134.24	1	203.16
Oct 31 – Nov 2, 2014	2014 Skate Canada International	1	72.70	1	138.04	1	210.74
Nov 28–30, 2014	(Japan) 2014 NHK Trophy	1	72.70	1	127.08	1	199.78
Dec 11–14, 2014	(Spain) 2014–15 Grand Prix Final	1	74.50	1	146.22	1	220.72
Jan 19–25, 2015	(Canada) 2015 Canadian Championships	1	79.50	1	150.69	1	230.19
Feb 9–15, 2015	(South Korea) 2015 Four Continents Championships	1	75.67	1	143.81	1	219.48
Mar 23–29, 2015	(China) 2015 World Championships	1	76.98	1	144.55	1	221.53
Apr 16–19, 2015	(Japan) 2015 World Team Trophy	2	68.68	1	140.70	4	–

Results in the 2015–16 season
Date	Event	SP		FS		Total	
Date	Event	P	Score	P	Score	P	Score
Oct 12–15, 2015	(Canada) 2015 Autumn Classic International	1	68.97	1	133.64	1	202.61
Oct 30 – Nov 1, 2015	2015 Skate Canada International	1	72.46	1	143.70	1	216.16
Nov 27–29, 2015	(Japan) 2015 NHK Trophy	1	71.04	1	131.68	1	202.72
Dec 10–13, 2015	(Spain) 2015–16 Grand Prix Final	3	72.74	2	143.93	2	216.67
Jan 18–24, 2016	(Canada) 2016 Canadian Championships	1	73.03	1	148.72	1	221.75
Feb 16–21, 2016	(Taiwan) 2016 Four Continents Championships	2	71.90	–	–	–	WD
Mar 28 – Apr 3, 2016	(United States) 2016 World Championships	2	78.18	1	153.81	1	231.99
Apr 22–24, 2016	(United States) 2016 Team Challenge Cup	–	–	1	147.48	1	–

Results in the 2016–17 season
Date	Event	SP		FS		Total	
Date	Event	P	Score	P	Score	P	Score
Oct 6–10, 2016	(Finland) 2016 CS Finlandia Trophy	1	66.49	1	131.29	1	197.78
Oct 28–30, 2016	2016 Skate Canada International	1	78.39	1	139.91	1	218.30
Nov 25–27, 2016	(Japan) 2016 NHK Trophy	2	72.95	1	131.61	1	204.56
Dec 8–11, 2016	(France) 2016–17 Grand Prix Final	3	71.44	2	134.55	3	205.99
Jan 16–22, 2017	(Canada) 2017 Canadian Championships	1	80.72	1	146.51	1	227.23
Feb 15–19, 2017	(South Korea) 2017 Four Continents Championships	3	74.31	2	137.92	2	212.23
Mar 29 – Apr 2, 2017	(Finland) 2017 World Championships	7	72.67	7	133.39	7	206.06

Results in the 2017–18 season
Date	Event	SP		FS		Total	
Date	Event	P	Score	P	Score	P	Score
Sep 20–23, 2017	(Canada) 2017 CS Autumn Classic International	1	77.14	3	125.84	2	202.98
Oct 27–29, 2017	2017 Skate Canada International	2	73.53	1	148.69	1	222.22
Nov 24–26, 2017	(United States) 2017 Skate America	1	75.37	3	140.31	3	215.68
Dec 7–10, 2017	(Japan) 2017–18 Grand Prix Final	5	72.18	3	138.65	3	210.83
Jan 8–14, 2018	(Canada) 2018 Canadian Championships	1	81.78	1	152.77	1	234.55
Feb 9–12, 2018	(South Korea) 2018 Winter Olympics (Team event)	2	76.57	1	148.51	1	–
Feb 14–15, 2018	(South Korea) 2018 Winter Olympics	3	76.82	2	153.33	3	230.15
