= Meagan Duhamel =

Canadian pair skater

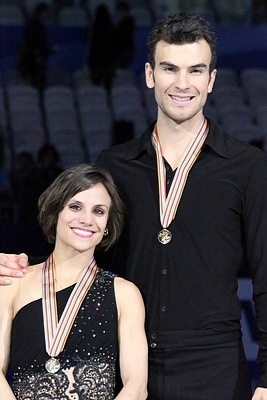
- Meagan Duhamel and Eric Radford at the 2015 World Championships

Personal information
- Born: December 8, 1985 (age 40) Lively, Ontario, Canada
- Home town: Boucherville, Quebec
- Height: 1.49 m (4 ft 11 in)

Figure skating career
- Country: Canada
- Discipline: Pair skating (2004–18); Women's singles (2001–07)
- Partner: Eric Radford (2010–18); Craig Buntin (2007–10); Ryan Arnold (2004–06)
- Began skating: 1988
- Retired: April 25, 2018
- Highest WS: 1st (2016–17, 2015–16 & 2014–15)

Medal record
| Event | Gold medal – first place | Silver medal – second place | Bronze medal – third place |
| Olympic Games | 1 | 1 | 1 |
| World Championships | 2 | 0 | 2 |
| Four Continents Championships | 2 | 2 | 1 |
| Grand Prix Final | 1 | 1 | 2 |
| Canadian Championships | 7 | 2 | 2 |
| World Team Trophy | 0 | 1 | 1 |
Medal list
Olympic Games
| Gold medal – first place | 2018 Pyeongchang | Team |
| Silver medal – second place | 2014 Sochi | Team |
| Bronze medal – third place | 2018 Pyeongchang | Pairs |
World Championships
| Gold medal – first place | 2015 Shanghai | Pairs |
| Gold medal – first place | 2016 Boston | Pairs |
| Bronze medal – third place | 2013 London | Pairs |
| Bronze medal – third place | 2014 Saitama | Pairs |
Four Continents Championships
| Gold medal – first place | 2013 Osaka | Pairs |
| Gold medal – first place | 2015 Seoul | Pairs |
| Silver medal – second place | 2011 Taipei | Pairs |
| Silver medal – second place | 2017 Gangneung | Pairs |
| Bronze medal – third place | 2010 Jeonju | Pairs |
Grand Prix Final
| Gold medal – first place | 2014–15 Barcelona | Pairs |
| Silver medal – second place | 2015–16 Barcelona | Pairs |
| Bronze medal – third place | 2016–17 Marseille | Pairs |
| Bronze medal – third place | 2017–18 Nagoya | Pairs |
Canadian Championships
| Gold medal – first place | 2012 Moncton | Pairs |
| Gold medal – first place | 2013 Mississauga | Pairs |
| Gold medal – first place | 2014 Ottawa | Pairs |
| Gold medal – first place | 2015 Kingston | Pairs |
| Gold medal – first place | 2016 Halifax | Pairs |
| Gold medal – first place | 2017 Ottawa | Pairs |
| Gold medal – first place | 2018 Vancouver | Pairs |
| Silver medal – second place | 2009 Saskatoon | Pairs |
| Silver medal – second place | 2011 Victoria | Pairs |
| Bronze medal – third place | 2008 Vancouver | Pairs |
| Bronze medal – third place | 2010 London | Pairs |
World Team Trophy
| Silver medal – second place | 2013 Tokyo | Team |
| Bronze medal – third place | 2012 Tokyo | Team |

Meagan Duhamel (born December 8, 1985) is a Canadian retired pair skater. With partner Eric Radford, she is a two-time world champion (2015, 2016), a 2018 Olympic gold medallist in the team event, a 2014 Olympic silver medallist in the team event, a 2018 Olympic bronze medallist in the pairs event, a two-time Four Continents champion (2013, 2015), the 2014–15 Grand Prix Final champion, and a seven-time Canadian national champion (2012–18).

During the 2014 Olympics, Duhamel and Radford became the first pair to land a side-by-side triple Lutz jump at any Winter Olympic competition.

At the 2018 Winter Olympics, 32-year-old Duhamel won a gold medal as part of the figure skating team event, becoming one of the oldest Olympic champions in figure skating. Three days later, during the individual pairs free skate, Duhamel and Radford became the first team to complete a quadruple throw jump at any Winter Olympic competition when she landed their throw quadruple Salchow.

With previous partner Craig Buntin, Duhamel became the 2010 Four Continents bronze medallist and a three-time Canadian national medallist (one silver, two bronze).

Duhamel and her previous partner, Ryan Arnold, were the first pair to land a side-by-side triple Lutz jump in competition, which they did at the 2005 Canadian Championships. At the 2005 World Junior Figure Skating Championships, they became the first team to land a throw triple Lutz jump in international competition.

== Personal life ==
Meagan Duhamel was born on December 8, 1985, in Sudbury, Ontario, and raised in the Lively neighbourhood. She is of Finnish descent on her mother's side and French on her father's, Duhamel is an old French surname meaning "Of the Hamlet", implying her French ancestors were from a small farming village. She is studying holistic health.

In July 2014, it was publicly announced that she was engaged to her coach Bruno Marcotte. The couple married on June 5, 2015, in Bermuda. They share two daughters. In August 2018, Greater Sudbury City Council renamed the street in Lively that Duhamel grew up on in her honour.

== Skating career ==
=== Early career ===
Duhamel began skating when she was three years old, in 1988. At age 14, she moved to Barrie, Ontario to train at the Mariposa School of Skating.

Duhamel competed in both singles and pairs for several years. She teamed up with Ryan Arnold in the spring of 2004. They were the first skaters to land a side-by-side triple Lutz jump in competition, which they did at the 2005 Canadian Championships. At the 2005 World Junior Figure Skating Championships, they became the first team to land a throw triple Lutz jump in international competition. They ended their partnership in March 2006. Duhamel had a stress fracture and was off the ice for four months. She withdrew from both her Grand Prix events due to injury. She competed at the 2007 Canadian Championships and placed sixth; it was the last time she competed as a single skater. She was coached by Lee Barkell.

=== Partnership with Buntin ===
In June 2007, Duhamel moved to Montreal and teamed up with Craig Buntin. In January 2008, the pair won the bronze medal at the Canadian Nationals but during the exhibition Buntin injured his shoulder, with which he had previous problems, as a result of a timing issue. They missed the Four Continents but competed at the 2008 World Championships in Sweden on March 19, 2008, despite the shoulder still being a problem, and finished 6th. However, their participation aggravated Buntin's injury, tearing the rotator cuff, the labrum and three tendons; he had surgery in April and the recovery took seven to eight months. They could not practice lifts until two weeks before 2008 Skate America so they worked on adding variations to their elements, such as a spread eagle entrance into a lift and a death spiral with the opposite hand.

In November 2008, during the long program at the Trophée Eric Bompard, Duhamel accidentally sliced Buntin's hand a minute into the program, on their side-by-side salchow jumps, and blood dripped onto the ice; the pair stopped to get his hand bandaged and then resumed the program to win the bronze medal. In July 2010, Buntin announced his retirement from competitive figure skating. Having experienced two stress fractures, a bulging disc in her back, and a nerve dysfunction in her leg, Duhamel also considered retiring but soon decided to continue competing.

=== 2010–2011 season: First season with Radford ===
At a coach's suggestion, Duhamel had a tryout with Eric Radford and they decided to compete together. They won a silver medal at the 2011 Canadian Championships and were assigned to the 2011 Four Continents Championships and the 2011 World Championships. At Four Continents, the pair won a silver medal.

During the short program at the 2011 World Championships, Radford's nose was broken when Duhamel's elbow hit him on the descent from a triple twist, their first element – she opened up too early. Seeing the blood, Duhamel suggested they stop but he decided to continue and they finished the program without a pause. Duhamel had not done a triple twist since 2005, and the new pair only began performing it before the Canadian Championships.

=== 2011–2012 season ===
Duhamel/Radford won bronze medals at their Grand Prix events, the 2011 Skate Canada and 2011 Trophée Eric Bompard. They won their first national title and finished 5th at the 2012 World Championships.

=== 2012–2013 season ===
The next season, Duhamel/Radford won silver at their Grand Prix events, the 2012 Skate Canada International and 2012 Trophée Eric Bompard. They then won their second national title and their first Four Continents title. Duhamel/Radford stepped onto the World podium for the first time at the 2013 World Championships in London, Ontario, where they won the bronze medal.

=== 2013–2014 season ===
Duhamel/Radford skated their short program to music composed by Radford. During the 2014 Olympics, Duhamel and Radford became the first pair team to land a side-by-side triple Lutz at any Winter Olympic competition. After finishing seventh at the 2014 Winter Olympics in Sochi, they returned to the podium at the 2014 World Championships, where they scored personal bests in both the short program and the free skate on their way to a second bronze medal.

=== 2014–2015 season ===
Duhamel/Radford practiced a quad throw Salchow during the summer of 2014. At the inaugural 2014 Autumn Classic International held in Barrie, Ontario, they successfully executed the quad throw Salchow and won the event. They were chosen to compete at the 2014 Skate Canada International and 2014 NHK Trophy in the 2014–15 Grand Prix season. They won both events and eventually won their first Grand Prix Final title. At the Grand Prix Final, they improved their personal best scores in the free skating and combined total. They continued their first place streak by winning their fourth Canadian title and their second Four Continents title. In March 2015, they won gold in pairs at the 2015 World Championships, capping a perfect season in which they won gold at every international event where they competed.

=== 2015–2016 season ===
Duhamel/Radford began their season by winning the 2015 Skate Canada Autumn Classic. Turning to the Grand Prix series, they won gold medals at the 2015 Skate Canada International and 2015 NHK Trophy. In December, they took silver behind Stolbova/Klimov at the Grand Prix Final in Barcelona.

In January 2016, Duhamel/Radford won their fifth consecutive national title, at the Canadian Championships. They withdrew from the 2016 Four Continents Championships in Taipei due to Duhamel's illness. In April, they competed at the 2016 World Championships in Boston, placing second in the short and first in the free. They were awarded the gold medal ahead of Sui/Han and Savchenko/Massot, who took silver and bronze respectively.

=== 2016–2017 season ===
Duhamel/Radford received the bronze medal at the Grand Prix Final in December 2016 before winning their sixth consecutive national title. In January 2017. In February, they took the silver medal behind Sui/Han at the 2017 Four Continents Championships. At the 2017 World Championships, held in March in Helsinki, Finland, Radford had trouble training due to a muscle spasm in his hip. The pair finished 7th at the competition.

=== 2017–2018 season ===
Duhamel/Radford began their final competitive season with silver at the 2017 CS Autumn Classic. Switching to the Grand Prix series, the pair took gold at the 2017 Skate Canada International after ranking second in the short program and first in the free skate. At the 2017 Skate America, they received the bronze medal after ranking first in the short and third in the free. Their scores at their two Grand Prix events qualified the pair to compete at the 2017–18 Grand Prix Final, held in December in Nagoya, Japan. They climbed from fifth after the short to obtain the bronze medal at the final.

In January, Duhamel/Radford won their seventh consecutive Canadian pairs' title, an all-time record, at the 2018 Canadian National Championships. In February, they represented Canada at their second Winter Olympics, which took place in PyeongChang, South Korea. Competing in the team event, they placed second in the short program, and first in the free skate, contributing to Canada's team gold medal. At 32 and 33 years old respectively, they were among the oldest Olympic champions in figure skating. They were the only top pair to skate both segments of the team competition, as individual pairs was to take place first of the individual figure skating events. In the individual event, Duhamel/Radford ranked third in the short program and second in the free skate, finishing in third place and earning the bronze medal. They became the first pair to complete a throw quad at any Winter Olympic competition.

On April 25, the two announced their retirement from competition. Duhamel expressed interest in becoming a technical specialist.

== Post-competitive career ==
In spring of 2019, it was announced that Duhamel would move to Oakville, Ontario to coach at the Skate Oakville Skating Club with husband, Bruno Marcotte. She is currently part of the coaching team of the Japanese pair team Riku Miura / Ryuichi Kihara.

Duhamel competed on the sixth season of the CBC series Battle of the Blades, partnered with retired NHL player Wojtek Wolski. Inspired by her own daughter Zoey's need for neonatal intensive care following birth, Duhamel competed on behalf of the Sandra Schmirler Foundation. Duhamel and Wolski won the contest.

In the spring of 2021, it was announced that Radford would be returning to competition with a new partner, Vanessa James. Duhamel stated that she and Radford had had a verbal agreement to continue doing show skating, which had included shows being arranged while he was trying out with James, and that she felt "blindsided" by the news. In May, Duhamel announced a return to the fall tour of Stars on Ice, in which she would perform with former domestic rival Dylan Moscovitch.

== Programs ==
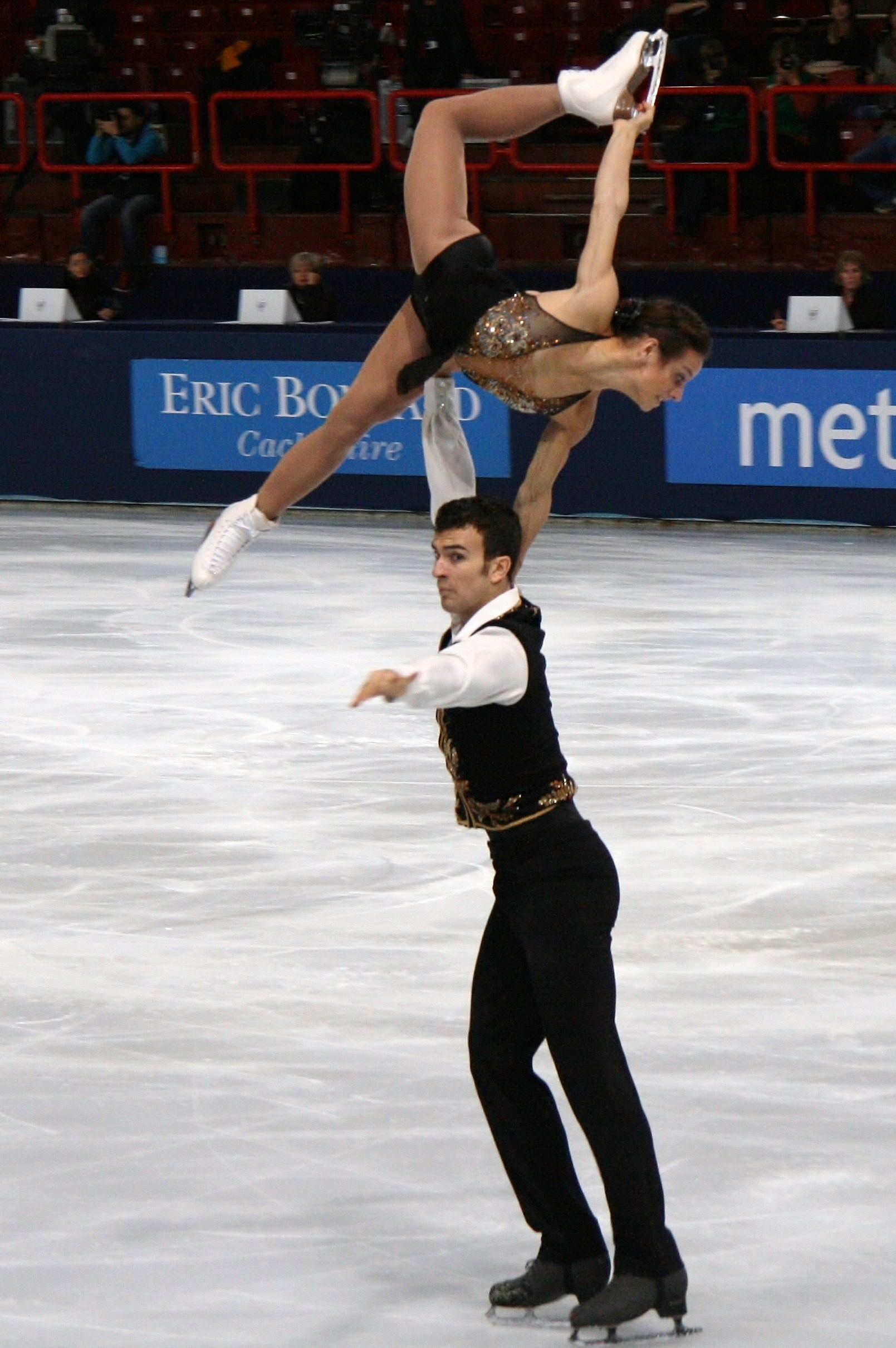
Duhamel and Radford in 2011

=== With Radford ===
| Season | Short program | Free skating | Exhibition |
|---|---|---|---|
| 2017–2018 | With or Without You by U2 performed by April Meservy choreo. by John Kerr, Julie Marcotte | Hometown Glory by Adele choreo. by Julie Marcotte; Neutron Star Collision by Muse; I Belong to You (from "Samson and Delilah") performed by Muse; Uprising by Muse choreo. by Julie Marcotte | Be Mine by Ofenbach choreo. by Jeffrey Buttle; Sign of the Times by Harry Styles; Piano Man by Billy Joel; "Selene, la dea della luna" - Chandelier by Sia; "Apollo and Daphne, a Love Chase"; Heroes by David Bowie and Brian Eno performed by Peter Gabriel |
| 2016–2017 | Killer by Adamski, Seal performed by Seal choreo. by Julie Marcotte | Non, je ne regrette rien by Charles Dumont, Michel Vaucaire performed by Patricia Kaas choreo. by Julie Marcotte | Heroes by David Bowie and Brian Eno; Piano Man by Billy Joel |
| 2015–2016 | Your Song (from Moulin Rouge!) by Elton John performed by Ewan McGregor choreo. by Julie Marcotte | Hometown Glory by Adele choreo. by Julie Marcotte | Piano Man by Billy Joel; Believe by Mumford & Sons; Smile (from Modern Times) performed by Nat King Cole |
| 2014–2015 | Un peu plus haut by Ginette Reno choreo. by Julie Marcotte | Neutron Star Collision by Muse; I Belong to You (from "Samson and Delilah") performed by Muse; Uprising by Muse choreo. by Julie Marcotte | One by Mary J. Blige and U2 choreo. by Julie Marcotte; Say Something by A Great Big World |
| 2013–2014 | Tribute original composition by Eric Radford arranged by Louis Babin choreo. by Julie Marcotte | Alice in Wonderland by Danny Elfman; Everlasting by Two Steps from Hell choreo. by Julie Marcotte | True Colors by Artists Against Bullying; Say Something by A Great Big World |
| 2012–2013 | La bohème performed by Roby Lakatos; La bohéme performed by Paul McCoy; La bohéme performed by Bruno Walker, Jean Kikteff choreo. by Julie Marcotte | Angel by Philippe Rombi choreo. by Julie Marcotte | Ho Hey by The Lumineers; Hometown Glory by Adele |
| 2011–2012 | Concierto de Aranjuez by Joaquín Rodrigo choreo. by Julie Marcotte | Viva la Vida by Coldplay; Yellow by Coldplay choreo. by Julie Marcotte | When She Loved Me performed by Josh Young; Don't Stop Believin' (from Glee) performed by Lea Michele and Cory Monteith |
| 2010–2011 | Concerto pour une Voix by Saint-Preux choreo. by Julie Marcotte | The Train by Konstantin Krimets; Meet Joe Black by Thomas Newman choreo. by Julie Marcotte | Don't Stop Believin' (from Glee) performed by Lea Michele and Cory Monteith |

=== With Buntin ===
| Season | Short program | Free skating | Exhibition |
|---|---|---|---|
| 2009–2010 | Hotel California by Eagles | Selection of music by Pierre Porte | |
| 2008–2009 | 4 Lamentations | Tosca by Giacomo Puccini | The Story by Brandi Carlile |
| 2007–2008 | Best Latin Tango by Rodrigo Buertillo | Tosca by Giacomo Puccini | Bolero (from Moulin Rouge!) |

=== With Arnold ===
| Season | Short program | Free skating |
|---|---|---|
| 2005–2006 | Quixote by Bond | Un homme et son péché by Michel Cusson |
| 2004–2005 | Adagio by Remo Giazotto, Tomaso Albinoni | Concierto de Aranjuez by Joaquín Rodrigo; Leyenda by Andy Hill performed by Vanessa-Mae |

=== Singles career ===
| Season | Short program | Free skating |
|---|---|---|
| 2005–2006 | Croatian Rhapsody by Maksim Mrvica | Rondo Capriccioso by Camille Saint-Saëns |
| 2004–2005 | Passacaglia by Rolf Løvland performed by Secret Garden | Rondo Capriccioso by Camille Saint-Saëns |
| 2003–2004 | Passacaglia by Rolf Løvland performed by Secret Garden | Piano Concerto No. 2; Rhapsody on a Theme of Paganini by Sergei Rachmaninoff |

== Competitive highlights ==
- GP – Event of the ISU Grand Prix Series
- JGP – Event of the ISU Junior Grand Prix Series
- CS – Event of the ISU Challenger Series
- WD – Withdrew from competition
- Medals at team events are awarded for the team results only. Individual placements at team events are listed in parentheses.

=== Pair skating with Eric Radford ===
Competition placements at senior level
| Season | 2010–11 | 2011–12 | 2012–13 | 2013–14 | 2014–15 | 2015–16 | 2016–17 | 2017–18 |
|---|---|---|---|---|---|---|---|---|
| Winter Olympics | | | | 7th | | | | 3rd |
| Winter Olympics (Team event) | | | | 2nd | | | | 1st |
| World Championships | 7th | 5th | 3rd | 3rd | 1st | 1st | 7th | WD |
| Four Continents Championships | 2nd | 4th | 1st | | 1st | WD | 2nd | |
| Grand Prix Final | | 5th | 4th | 5th | 1st | 2nd | 3rd | 3rd |
| Canadian Championships | 2nd | 1st | 1st | 1st | 1st | 1st | 1st | 1st |
| GP NHK Trophy | | | | | 1st | 1st | 1st | |
| GP Skate America | | | | | | | | 3rd |
| GP Skate Canada | 5th | 3rd | 2nd | 3rd | 1st | 1st | 1st | 1st |
| GP Trophée Éric Bompard | | 3rd | 2nd | 2nd | | | | |
| CS Autumn Classic | | | | | 1st | 1st | | 2nd |
| CS Finlandia Trophy | | | | | | | 1st | |
| Nebelhorn Trophy | 3rd | | | | | | | |
| Team Challenge Cup | | | | | | 1st (1st) | | |
| World Team Trophy | | 3rd (2nd) | 2nd (2nd) | | 4th (2nd) | | | |

=== Pair skating with Craig Buntin ===
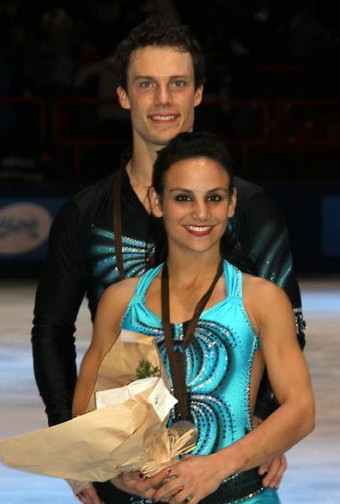
Duhamel and Buntin in 2008

Competition placements at senior level
| Season | 2007–08 | 2008–09 | 2009–10 |
|---|---|---|---|
| World Championships | 6th | 8th | |
| Four Continents Championships | | 4th | 3rd |
| Canadian Championships | 3rd | 2nd | 3rd |
| GP Cup of China | | | 4th |
| GP Skate America | | 4th | WD |
| GP Skate Canada | 6th | | |
| GP Trophée Éric Bompard | | 3rd | |
| Nebelhorn Trophy | 2nd | | |

=== Pair skating with Ryan Arnold ===
Competition placements at junior & senior level
| Season | 2004–05 | 2005–06 |
|---|---|---|
| Golden Spin of Zagreb | | 1st |
| Nebelhorn Trophy | | 2nd |
| World Junior Championships | 8th | |
| JGP Serbia | 5th | |
| Canadian Championships | 8th | 6th |

=== Singles skating ===
Competition placements at junior level
| Season | 2001–02 | 2002–03 | 2003–04 | 2004–05 |
|---|---|---|---|---|
| World Junior Championships | | 13th | | |
| Junior Grand Prix Final | | | | 5th |
| Canadian Championships | 4th | 1st | | |
| JGP France | | 4th | | 1st |
| JGP Romania | | | | 5th |
| JGP Slovakia | | 12th | 6th | |
| JGP Sweden | 8th | | | |
| Triglav Trophy | 5th | | | |

Competition placements at senior level
| Season | 2003–04 | 2004–05 | 2005–06 | 2006–07 |
|---|---|---|---|---|
| Four Continents Championships | | | 5th | |
| Canadian Championships | 10th | 7th | 4th | 6th |
| Golden Spin of Zagreb | | | 2nd | |

== Detailed results ==
- Small medals for the short program and free skating are only awarded at ISU Championships.
- Medals at team events are awarded for the team result only. The individual placements at team events are listed in parentheses.

=== Pair skating with Eric Radford ===
ISU personal best scores in the +3/-3 GOE System
| Segment | Type | Score | Event |
|---|---|---|---|
| Total | TSS | 231.99 | 2016 World Championships |
| Short program | TSS | 78.39 | 2016 Skate Canada International |
| Short program | TES | 43.90 | 2016 Skate Canada International |
| Short program | PCS | 36.25 | 2016 World Championships |
| Free skating | TSS | 153.81 | 2016 World Championships |
| Free skating | TES | 79.46 | 2016 World Championships |
| Free skating | PCS | 74.35 | 2016 World Championships |

Results in the 2010–11 season
| Date | Event | SP | | FS | | Total | |
| Date | Event | P | Score | P | Score | P | Score |
|---|---|---|---|---|---|---|---|
| Sep 23–26, 2010 | (Germany) 2010 Nebelhorn Trophy | 3 | 51.81 | 3 | 95.63 | 3 | 147.44 |
| Oct 28–31, 2010 | 2010 Skate Canada International | 4 | 54.80 | 4 | 103.73 | 5 | 158.53 |
| Jan 17–23, 2011 | (Canada) 2011 Canadian Championships | 4 | 57.71 | 2 | 113.63 | 2 | 171.34 |
| Jan 24–30, 2011 | (Taiwan) 2011 Four Continents Championships | 3 | 59.92 | 2 | 121.87 | 2 | 181.79 |
| Apr 27 – May 1, 2011 | (Russia) 2011 World Championships | 7 | 58.83 | 7 | 114.20 | 7 | 173.03 |

Results in the 2011–12 season
| Date | Event | SP | | FS | | Total | |
| Date | Event | P | Score | P | Score | P | Score |
|---|---|---|---|---|---|---|---|
| Oct 27–30, 2011 | 2011 Skate Canada International | 2 | 62.37 | 3 | 112.47 | 3 | 174.84 |
| Nov 17–20, 2011 | (France) 2011 Trophée Éric Bompard | 2 | 61.06 | 3 | 115.56 | 3 | 176.62 |
| Dec 8–11, 2011 | (Canada) 2011–12 Grand Prix Final | 5 | 61.04 | 5 | 109.39 | 5 | 170.43 |
| Jan 16–22, 2012 | (Canada) 2012 Canadian Championships | 1 | 60.92 | 1 | 129.19 | 1 | 190.11 |
| Feb 7–12, 2012 | (United States) 2012 Four Continents Championships | 8 | 57.53 | 4 | 114.23 | 4 | 171.76 |
| Mar 26 – Apr 1, 2012 | (France) 2012 World Championships | 5 | 63.69 | 5 | 121.72 | 5 | 185.41 |
| Apr 19–22, 2012 | (Japan) 2012 World Team Trophy | 4 | 59.27 | 2 | 112.64 | 3 | – |

Results in the 2012–13 season
| Date | Event | SP | | FS | | Total | |
| Date | Event | P | Score | P | Score | P | Score |
|---|---|---|---|---|---|---|---|
| Oct 26–28, 2012 | 2012 Skate Canada International | 2 | 64.49 | 2 | 126.00 | 2 | 190.49 |
| Nov 15–18, 2012 | (France) 2012 Trophée Éric Bompard | 2 | 62.28 | 1 | 124.43 | 2 | 186.71 |
| Dec 6–9, 2012 | (Russia) 2012–13 Grand Prix Final | 4 | 64.20 | 4 | 122.89 | 4 | 187.09 |
| Jan 13–20, 2013 | (Canada) 2013 Canadian Championships | 1 | 69.08 | 1 | 137.55 | 1 | 206.63 |
| Feb 6–11, 2013 | (Japan) 2013 Four Continents Championships | 1 | 70.44 | 2 | 128.74 | 1 | 199.18 |
| Mar 13–15, 2013 | (Canada) 2013 World Championships | 2 | 73.61 | 3 | 130.95 | 3 | 204.56 |
| Apr 11–14, 2013 | (Japan) 2013 World Team Trophy | 2 | 69.94 | 2 | 121.21 | 2 | – |

Results in the 2013–14 season
| Date | Event | SP | | FS | | Total | |
| Date | Event | P | Score | P | Score | P | Score |
|---|---|---|---|---|---|---|---|
| Oct 24–27, 2013 | 2013 Skate Canada International | 1 | 69.57 | 3 | 121.05 | 3 | 190.62 |
| Nov 15–17, 2013 | (France) 2013 Trophée Éric Bompard | 2 | 66.07 | 2 | 124.82 | 2 | 190.89 |
| Dec 5–8, 2013 | (Japan) 2013–14 Grand Prix Final | 4 | 73.07 | 6 | 120.31 | 5 | 193.38 |
| Jan 9–15, 2014 | (Canada) 2014 Canadian Championships | 1 | 75.80 | 1 | 137.82 | 1 | 213.62 |
| Feb 6–22, 2014 | (Russia) 2014 Winter Olympics (Team event) | 2 | 73.10 | – | – | 2 | – |
| Feb 6–22, 2014 | (Russia) 2014 Winter Olympics | 5 | 72.21 | 7 | 127.32 | 7 | 199.53 |
| Mar 24–30, 2014 | (Japan) 2014 World Championships | 2 | 77.01 | 4 | 133.83 | 3 | 210.84 |

Results in the 2014–15 season
| Date | Event | SP | | FS | | Total | |
| Date | Event | P | Score | P | Score | P | Score |
|---|---|---|---|---|---|---|---|
| Oct 15–16, 2014 | (Canada) 2014 CS Autumn Classic International | 1 | 68.92 | 1 | 134.24 | 1 | 203.16 |
| Oct 31 – Nov 2, 2014 | 2014 Skate Canada International | 1 | 72.70 | 1 | 138.04 | 1 | 210.74 |
| Nov 28–30, 2014 | (Japan) 2014 NHK Trophy | 1 | 72.70 | 1 | 127.08 | 1 | 199.78 |
| Dec 11–14, 2014 | (Spain) 2014–15 Grand Prix Final | 1 | 74.50 | 1 | 146.22 | 1 | 220.72 |
| Jan 19–25, 2015 | (Canada) 2015 Canadian Championships | 1 | 79.50 | 1 | 150.69 | 1 | 230.19 |
| Feb 9–15, 2015 | (South Korea) 2015 Four Continents Championships | 1 | 75.67 | 1 | 143.81 | 1 | 219.48 |
| Mar 23–29, 2015 | (China) 2015 World Championships | 1 | 76.98 | 1 | 144.55 | 1 | 221.53 |
| Apr 16–19, 2015 | (Japan) 2015 World Team Trophy | 2 | 68.68 | 1 | 140.70 | 4 | – |

Results in the 2015–16 season
| Date | Event | SP | | FS | | Total | |
| Date | Event | P | Score | P | Score | P | Score |
|---|---|---|---|---|---|---|---|
| Oct 12–15, 2015 | (Canada) 2015 Autumn Classic International | 1 | 68.97 | 1 | 133.64 | 1 | 202.61 |
| Oct 30 – Nov 1, 2015 | 2015 Skate Canada International | 1 | 72.46 | 1 | 143.70 | 1 | 216.16 |
| Nov 27–29, 2015 | (Japan) 2015 NHK Trophy | 1 | 71.04 | 1 | 131.68 | 1 | 202.72 |
| Dec 10–13, 2015 | (Spain) 2015–16 Grand Prix Final | 3 | 72.74 | 2 | 143.93 | 2 | 216.67 |
| Jan 18–24, 2016 | (Canada) 2016 Canadian Championships | 1 | 73.03 | 1 | 148.72 | 1 | 221.75 |
| Feb 16–21, 2016 | (Taiwan) 2016 Four Continents Championships | 2 | 71.90 | – | – | – | WD |
| Mar 28 – Apr 3, 2016 | (United States) 2016 World Championships | 2 | 78.18 | 1 | 153.81 | 1 | 231.99 |
| Apr 22–24, 2016 | (United States) 2016 Team Challenge Cup | – | – | 1 | 147.48 | 1 | – |

Results in the 2016–17 season
| Date | Event | SP | | FS | | Total | |
| Date | Event | P | Score | P | Score | P | Score |
|---|---|---|---|---|---|---|---|
| Oct 6–10, 2016 | (Finland) 2016 CS Finlandia Trophy | 1 | 66.49 | 1 | 131.29 | 1 | 197.78 |
| Oct 28–30, 2016 | 2016 Skate Canada International | 1 | 78.39 | 1 | 139.91 | 1 | 218.30 |
| Nov 25–27, 2016 | (Japan) 2016 NHK Trophy | 2 | 72.95 | 1 | 131.61 | 1 | 204.56 |
| Dec 8–11, 2016 | (France) 2016–17 Grand Prix Final | 3 | 71.44 | 2 | 134.55 | 3 | 205.99 |
| Jan 16–22, 2017 | (Canada) 2017 Canadian Championships | 1 | 80.72 | 1 | 146.51 | 1 | 227.23 |
| Feb 15–19, 2017 | (South Korea) 2017 Four Continents Championships | 3 | 74.31 | 2 | 137.92 | 2 | 212.23 |
| Mar 29 – Apr 2, 2017 | (Finland) 2017 World Championships | 7 | 72.67 | 7 | 133.39 | 7 | 206.06 |

Results in the 2017–18 season
| Date | Event | SP | | FS | | Total | |
| Date | Event | P | Score | P | Score | P | Score |
|---|---|---|---|---|---|---|---|
| Sep 20–23, 2017 | (Canada) 2017 CS Autumn Classic International | 1 | 77.14 | 3 | 125.84 | 2 | 202.98 |
| Oct 27–29, 2017 | 2017 Skate Canada International | 2 | 73.53 | 1 | 148.69 | 1 | 222.22 |
| Nov 24–26, 2017 | (United States) 2017 Skate America | 1 | 75.37 | 3 | 140.31 | 3 | 215.68 |
| Dec 7–10, 2017 | (Japan) 2017–18 Grand Prix Final | 5 | 72.18 | 3 | 138.65 | 3 | 210.83 |
| Jan 8–14, 2018 | (Canada) 2018 Canadian Championships | 1 | 81.78 | 1 | 152.77 | 1 | 234.55 |
| Feb 9–12, 2018 | (South Korea) 2018 Winter Olympics (Team event) | 2 | 76.57 | 1 | 148.51 | 1 | – |
| Feb 14–15, 2018 | (South Korea) 2018 Winter Olympics | 3 | 76.82 | 2 | 153.33 | 3 | 230.15 |
