= Look to Your Path =

"Look to Your Path (Vois sur ton Chemin)"

Song by Jean-Baptiste Maunier

from the album The Chorus
- Genre: Choral
- Songwriters: Bruno Coulais & Christophe Barratier

"Vois sur ton chemin" (in English, "Look to Your Path" or "See Upon Your Path") is a song from the 2004 film Les Choristes. Text and music are by Bruno Coulais and Christophe Barratier.

In the film, the song was performed by Jean-Baptiste Maunier from the choir Les Petits Chanteurs de Saint-Marc.

== Covers and remixes ==
- Candan Erçetin recorded a Turkish version, "Sevdim Anladım", with the Kuştepe Çocuk Korosu choir in her Remix'5 album.
- In 2005, the song was performed phonetically by Beyoncé and the American Boychoir at the 2005 Academy Awards.
- Techno remixes include:
  - In 2007, Le Bask sampled several parts of the song in his Frenchcore remix "Hardchoriste" from his album "Prostitution Sonore". In 2023, the video of the remix has 1 million views.
  - In 2023 Brazilian disc-jockey DJ Holanda remixed the song with a Brazilian funk twist. It garnered 9.5 million views in 4 months on YouTube.
  - On July 28, 2023, the German disc-jockey Bennett included the song in his remix "Vois sur ton chemin (Techno Mix)" on the single of the same name. The video of the remix reached over 10 million views in 2 months, with the record climbing to number one on the Offizielle Charts German singles Top 40 after 24 weeks.

=== Charts and certifications ===
==== Weekly charts ====
Weekly chart performance for "Vois sur ton chemin" Bennett edition
Chart (2023–2024)	Peak position
Austria (Ö3 Austria Top 40)	3
Belarus Airplay (TopHit)	374
Belgium (Ultratop 50 Flanders)	24
Belgium (Ultratop 50 Wallonia)	13
Czech Republic (Singles Digitál Top 100)	22
France (SNEP)	9
Germany (GfK)	1
Germany Dance (GfK)	1
Global 200 (Billboard)	129
Hungary (Single Top 40)	16
Italy (FIMI)	97
Luxembourg (Billboard)	5
Netherlands (Single Top 100)	4
Portugal (AFP)	111
Slovakia (Singles Digitál Top 100)	8
Spain (Promusicae)	83
Switzerland (Schweizer Hitparade)	4

==== Year-end charts ====
2024 year-end chart performance for "Vois sur ton chemin"
Chart (2024)	Position
Hungary (Single Top 40)	57

==== Certifications ====
Certifications for "Vois sur ton chemin" Bennett edition
Region	Certification	Certified units/sales
Austria (IFPI Austria)	2× Platinum	60,000^{‡}
Belgium (BRMA)	Platinum	40,000^{‡}
Denmark (IFPI Danmark)	Gold	45,000^{‡}
France (SNEP)	Diamond	333,333^{‡}
Germany (BVMI)	3× Gold	900,000^{‡}
Hungary (MAHASZ)	2× Platinum	8,000^{‡}
Italy (FIMI)	Platinum	100,000^{‡}
Netherlands (NVPI)	Platinum	93,000^{‡}
New Zealand (RMNZ)	Gold	15,000^{‡}
Poland (ZPAV)	Platinum	50,000^{‡}
Portugal (AFP)	Gold	5,000^{‡}
Spain (Promusicae)	Platinum	60,000^{‡}
Switzerland (IFPI Switzerland)	2× Platinum	60,000^{‡}
United Kingdom (BPI)	Silver	200,000^{‡}
^{‡} Sales+streaming figures based on certification alone.

== Nominations ==
- Oscars 2005: Nomination for the Academy Award for Best Original Song
