= Brigitte (duo) =

French indie folk musical duo

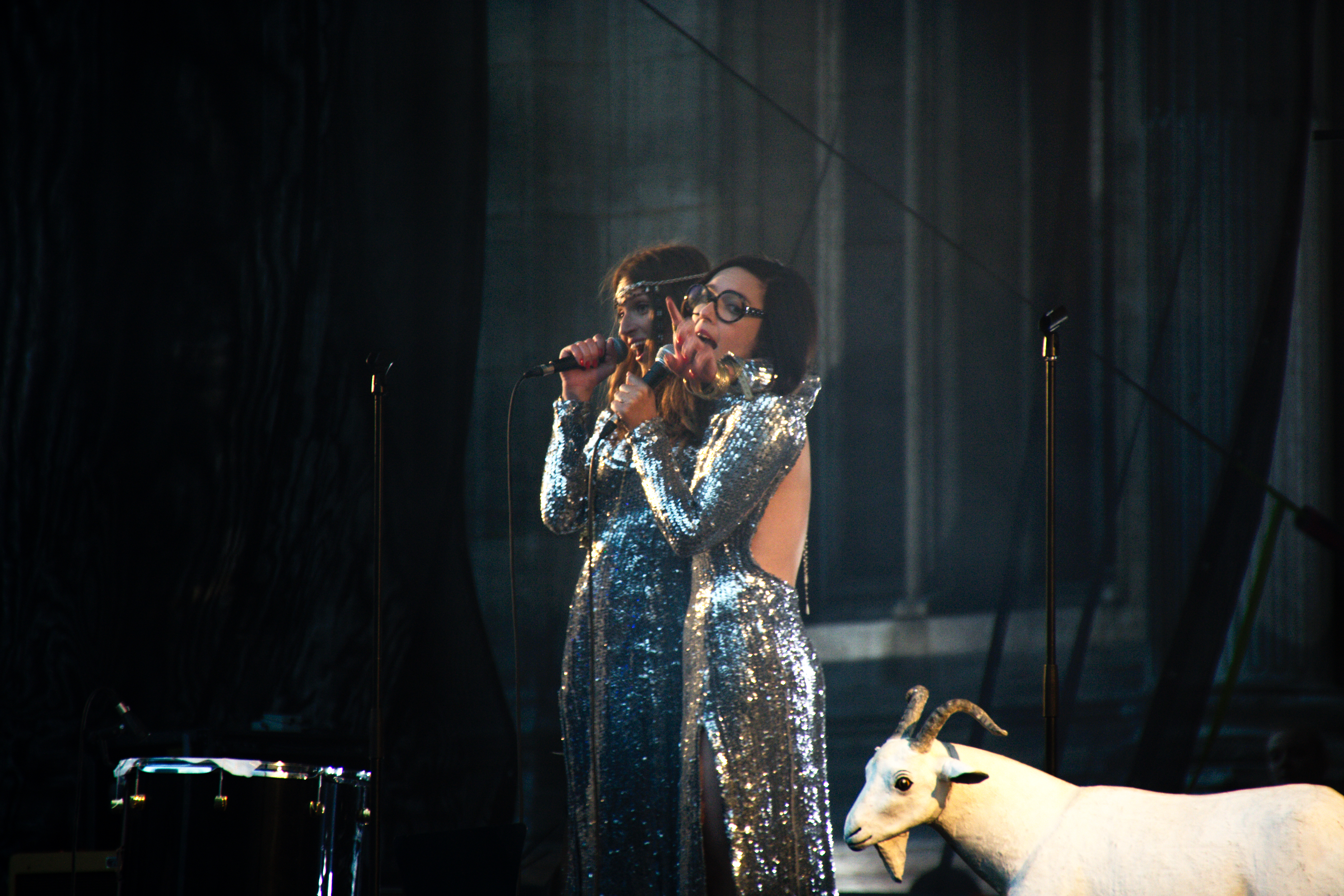
- Brigitte performing at the Festival Fnac Live, Paris, 23 July 2011

Background information
- Origin: Paris, France
- Genres: Indie folk, indie pop, neo soul
- Years active: 2008–2021
- Label: 3ème Bureau - Wagram
- Members: Sylvie Hoarau; Aurélie Saada
- Website: MySpace page

Brigitte is a French indie folk musical duo formed in 2008 by Sylvie Hoarau and Aurélie Saada . Their 2011 debut full-length album Et vous, tu m'aimes ?, went platinum in France. It is sold through both French and the U.S. iTunes Store.

On February 8, 2021, Saada said in an Instagram post that the duo had separated.

== Naming ==
Brigitte is a take on famous Brigittes of yore, such as Brigitte Bardot; in an interview, one of them said:

Brigitte, c'est rétro, notre style, c'est les années 50, c'est français, c'est Brigitte Bardot, c'est Brigitte Lahaie, c'est la tante qui cuisine, c'est la femme du cousin. Brigitte, c'est la femme au pluriel.

— Aurélie Maggiori, Sud Ouest, 21 July 2010

(Brigitte is retro, our style it's the 50s, it's French, it's Brigitte Bardot, it's Brigitte Lahaie, the aunt that cooks, the cousin's wife. Brigitte is the woman in plural)

== In popular culture ==
- English version of "Oh la la" was used for a Lancôme advertisement.
- "La Poudrière" was used as soundtrack for a short directed by Aurélie Saada for Vogue Eyewear.

== Discography ==
=== Albums ===
Year	Album	Peak positions			Certification	Notes
Year	Album	BEL Wa	FR	SWI	Certification	Notes
2011	Et vous, tu m'aimes?: Release date: 11 April 2011; Record label: 3ème Bureau - Wagram	4	14	64		
2012	Encore: Release date: 2012; Record label:	—	107	—		
2014	À bouche que veux-tu: Release date: 14 November 2014; Record label: Columbia Records (Sony)	23	7	39	SNEP: 2× Platinum	
2017	Nues: Release date: 17 November 2017; Record label: Columbia Records (Sony)	25	16	50	SNEP: Platinum	
2019	Toutes nues: Release date: 29 November 2019; Record label: Columbia Records (Sony)	124	15	—		

=== EPs ===
Year	EP
2011	Battez-vous (EP)

=== Singles ===
Year	Single	Peak positions		Album
Year	Single	BEL Wa	FR	Album
2010	"Ma Benz" (remake of a Suprême NTM hit)	33* (Ultratip)	72	
2011	"Battez-vous"	10	72	
2011	"Oh la la"	3* (Ultratip)	—	
2011	"Coeur de chewing gum"	14* (Ultratip)	—	
2014	"À bouche que veux-tu"	28* (Ultratip)	18	
2014	"J'sais pas"	—	68	
2017	"Palladium"	—	22	

*Did not appear in the official Belgian Ultratop 50 charts, but rather in the bubbling under Ultratip charts.

=== Covers ===
- "Ma Benz" by NTM
- "Rockin' Robin" by Michael Jackson
- "Concerto pour une Voix" by Saint Preux
- "Walk This Way" by Aerosmith and Run–D.M.C.
- "Allumer le feu" by Johnny Hallyday
- "Les Vacances au bord de la mer" by Michel Jonasz (Soundtrack of Thelma, Louise et Chantal)
- "Eye of the Tiger" by Survivor
- "Chez les Yéyés" by Serge Gainsbourg on France Inter - March 2011
- "I Want Your Sex" by George Michael on Taratata fête la Musique - 2011-06-21
- "L'amour est un oiseau rebelle", by Carmen for the ad Bledina - July 2011
- "The Bay" by Metronomy
