= Perfect Baby =

- Film poster
- Traditional Chinese: 巴黎寶貝
- Simplified Chinese: 巴黎宝贝
- Hanyu Pinyin: Bālí Bǎobèi
- Directed by: Wang Jing
- Written by: Wang Jing
- Produced by: Xu Jianhai; Yu Dongming
- Starring: Deng Chao; Jane March; Jean-Baptiste Maunier; Annie Yi; Liu Chenxi
- Cinematography: Charlie Lam Chi-Kin
- Edited by: Zhang Yifan; Chen Zhiwei
- Music by: Saint-Preux
- Production companies: Beijing Hairun Pictures Co., Ltd
- Distributed by: Huaxia Film Distribution
- Release date: 25 August 2011 (China)
- Running time: 92 minutes
- Country: China
- Languages: English; Mandarin

Perfect Baby (Chinese: 巴黎宝贝) is a 2011 Chinese romance film written and directed by Wang Jing and starring Deng Chao, Jane March, Jean-Baptiste Maunier, Annie Yi, and Liu Chenxi. The film premiered in China on August 25, 2011.

== Plot ==
Emma, a French writer, is very talented and pretty. She wishes to have a baby, but not finding her great love, she decides to use in vitro fertilization. Lio Ma, son of a wealthy Chinese man, wants to be a dancer. He went to France to study. He goes to donate sperm with his classmate Alex. Emma uses the wrong sperm, which makes the child a mixed race. She takes Leo Ma and Alex to court.

== Cast ==
- Deng Chao as Leo Ma, an overseas Chinese student in Paris.
- Jane March as Emma, a 38-year-old unmarried female writer.
- Jean-Baptiste Maunier as Alex, Leo Ma's classmate.
- Annie Yi as Rose
- Liu Chenxi as Claire, a test tube baby, Leo Ma and Emma's daughter.
- Cheng Qian as Lee
- Clémence Saint-Preux as Amy, Leo Ma's girlfriend.

== Production ==
This film was shot in Paris, capital of France. Jean-Jacques Annaud serves as its artist consultant.

== Release ==
The film was released on August 25, 2011, in China.
