= Jane March =

English actress (born 1973)

- Born: Jane March Horwood; 1973 (age 52–53); Edgware, London, England
- Occupation: Actress
- Years active: 1992–present
- Spouses: Carmine Zozzora (m. 1993; div. 2001); Steven Waddington
- Children: 1

Jane March Horwood (born 1973) is an English film actress and former model.

== Early life, family and education ==
March's father Bernard Horwood was a design and technology secondary school teacher of English and Spanish ancestry. Her mother is named Jean.

At age 14 and a student at Nower Hill High School in Pinner, north London, she won a Become a Model contest which launched her career.

== Career ==
After GCSEs, March moved to an apartment in Wimbledon with friends and continued to model before a call to audition in Paris on her 17th birthday following a cover shoot of Just Seventeen which had attracted the attention of French director Jean-Jacques Annaud's wife, Laurence Duval Annaud. March played the female lead in the 1992 film The Lover, based on a semi-autobiographical novel by Marguerite Duras.

Two years after The Lover, she co-starred with Bruce Willis in the erotic thriller Color of Night (1994), directed by Richard Rush. Maxim magazine ranked her sex scene in the film as "the Best Sex Scene in film history".

== Personal life ==
While Color of Night was in production, March began dating the film's co-producer, Carmine Zozzora. The couple married in June 1993, with Willis as the best man and Demi Moore as the maid of honour. According to Color of Night director Richard Rush, March still received many offers from Hollywood studios after the film's release, but Zozzora required the studios to also hire him as the producer for any film in which March would star, a condition most studios rejected. For this reason, March did not star in more films during their marriage.

March and Zozzora separated in 1997 and divorced in 2001. A few years later, March married Steven Waddington. They have one child.

== Filmography ==
Jane March's film credits
| Year | Title | Role | Notes |
|---|---|---|---|
| 1992 | The Lover | The Young Girl | |
| 1994 | Color of Night | Rose/Bonnie/Richie | |
| 1996 | Never Ever | Amanda Murray | |
| 1997 | Provocateur | Sook Hee | |
| 1998 | Tarzan and the Lost City | Jane Porter | |
| 2000 | Dark Prince: The True Story of Dracula | Lidia | |
| 2005 | Beauty and the Beast (a.k.a. Blood of Beasts) | Freya | |
| 2006 | The Stone Merchant | Leda | |
| 2009 | My Last Five Girlfriends | Olive | |
| 2010 | Clash of the Titans | Hestia | |
| 2010 | Stalker | Linda | |
| 2011 | Perfect Baby | Emma | |
| 2011 | Will | Sister Noell | |
| 2012 | Grimm's Snow White | Queen Gwendolyn | |
| 2013 | Jack the Giant Killer | Serena | |
