= Et vous, tu m'aimes? =

Studio album by Brigitte
- Released: 18 April 2011
- Recorded: 2011
- Genre: Indie folk; indie pop; neo soul
- Label: Wagram

Singles from Et vous, tu m'aimes ?
- 1. "Ma Benz" Released: 2010; 2. "Battez-vous" Released: 2010; 3. "Oh la la" Released: 2011; 4. "Cœur de chewing gum" Released: 2011

Et vous, tu m'aimes? is the debut album of French indie folk duo Brigitte.

== Track list (original) ==
1. "Battez-vous" (4:04)
2. "Cœur de chewing gum" (2:45)
3. "Big Bang (Au pays des Candides) (3:09)
4. "Monsieur je t'aime" (2:29)
5. "La Vengeance d'une louve" (3:21)
6. "English Song" (2:44)
7. "Je veux un enfant" (2:21)
8. "Ma Benz" (4:19)
9. "Oh la la" (2:59)
10. "Tumbleweed" (0:13)
11. "Après minuit" (2:57)
12. "Quel beau dimanche" (2:44)
13. "Et Claude François" (2:20)
14. "Hippocampe" (0:26)
15. "Jesus Sex Symbol" (2:00 empty) (7:44)
16. "Encore un verre" (hidden) (2:28)

Total duration = 47:30

== Track list (new edition) ==
1. "Battez-vous" (4:04)
2. "Cœur de chewing gum" (2:45)
3. "Big Bang (Au pays des Candides)" (3:09)
4. "Monsieur je t'aime" (2:29)
5. "La Vengeance d'une louve" (3:21)
6. "English Song" (2:44)
7. "Je veux un enfant" (2:21)
8. "Ma Benz" (4:19)
9. "Oh la la" (2:59)
10. "Tumbleweed" (0:13)
11. "Après minuit" (2:57)
12. "Quel beau dimanche" (2:44)
13. "Et Claude François" (2:20)
14. "Hippocampe" (0:26)
15. "Jesus Sex Symbol" (5:45)
16. "Ne me lâche pas" (3:16)
17. "Battez-vous" (Remix) (5:07)
18. "Encore un verre" (hidden) (2:27)

== Charts ==
Chart (2011)	Peak position
Belgian Albums (Ultratop Wallonia)	4
French Albums (SNEP)	14
Swiss Albums (Schweizer Hitparade)	64
