= The Lover (1992 film) =

- Theatrical release poster
- Directed by: Jean-Jacques Annaud
- Screenplay by: Jean-Jacques Annaud; Gérard Brach
- Based on: The Lover by Marguerite Duras
- Produced by: Claude Berri
- Starring: Jane March; Tony Leung Ka-fai
- Cinematography: Robert Fraisse
- Edited by: Noëlle Boisson
- Music by: Gabriel Yared
- Production companies: Films A2; Renn Productions; Burrill Productions
- Distributed by: AMLF (France); Guild Film Distribution (United Kingdom); Metro-Goldwyn-Mayer (United States)
- Release dates: 22 January 1992 (France); 19 June 1992 (United Kingdom); 30 October 1992 (United States)
- Running time: 115 minutes
- Countries: France; United Kingdom; Vietnam
- Languages: English; Cantonese; Vietnamese
- Budget: US$30 million
- Box office: US$34.2 million (France, UK and US)

The Lover (French: L'Amant) is a 1992 erotic romantic drama film produced by Claude Berri and directed by Jean-Jacques Annaud. Based on the semi-autobiographical 1984 novel of the same name by Marguerite Duras, the film details the illicit affair between a teenage French girl and a wealthy Chinese man in 1929 French Indochina. The protagonist is portrayed by Jane March and her lover is portrayed by Tony Leung Ka-fai. The film also features Jeanne Moreau as a narrator.

Development began in 1989, with principal photography commencing in 1991. The film made its theatrical debut on 22 January 1992 in France, on 19 June in the United Kingdom, and in the United States on 30 October of the same year. The film was nominated for the 1992 Academy Award for Best Cinematography and won the Motion Picture Sound Editors' 1993 Golden Reel Award for "Best Sound Editing — Foreign Feature". It was nominated for seven César Awards in France, winning the Award for Best Original Music. The film was a box office success in France and received generally positive reviews in Europe, while reviews from American critics were more mixed.

== Plot ==
In 1930s French Indochina, a 15-year-old French girl lives with her family in poverty in a rural area. Her mother, widowed and depressed, is a schoolteacher who lost all her savings in a failed agricultural venture after being swindled by the authorities. The older brother, Pierre, is an opium addict and violent, while the younger brother, Paul, has mental health issues. The girl, studious and solitary, dreams of becoming a writer.

On her return to Saigon from Sa Đéc after the school holidays, aboard a ferry crossing the Mekong River, the girl meets a 32-year-old Chinese man, the son of a wealthy property magnate. On the ferry's railing, the two have an awkward conversation, primarily due to the man's shyness in approaching a white French female. Having just returned from Paris, where he studied economics, he is captivated by the young female and offers her a lift to the city in his luxurious car. A silent connection and emotional tension begin to build between them as they speak little during the journey but hold hands. During this time, the girl claims to be 17.

The following day, the man waits for her outside the girl's boarding school and takes her to a room he rents in the Chinese quarter for his love affairs, where they have their first sexual encounter, and the girl loses her virginity. This marks the beginning of a secret relationship, consisting of passionate daily meetings, set against a backdrop of deep cultural, social, and racial barriers. The man falls deeply in love with the girl, despite her insistence that she does not want to be loved.

When the girl's family discovers the relationship, they initially react with anger but ultimately tolerate it, taking advantage of the gifts and money the man provides. The tension reaches a climax in a dramatic episode where the man, deeply wounded by the hostility of her family and overwhelmed by the circumstances, physically attacks her. The relationship deteriorates irreparably, also due to familial pressures: the man's father vehemently opposes the idea of his son marrying a white French female and insists that he enter into an arranged marriage with an Asian heiress, as was agreed many years earlier, to consolidate the families' business interests.

Later, the girl returns to France. On leaving, aboard the ship, the girl realises the depth of the feelings she had for the man now far away, and bursts into tears.

Many decades later, the protagonist, now a successful writer, receives a phone call from her former lover, who is visiting France with his wife. The man confesses that he has never stopped loving her and that he will continue to love her until his death.

== Cast ==
- Jane March as The Young Girl
- Tony Leung Ka-fai as The Chinese Man
- Frédérique Meininger as The Mother
- Arnaud Giovaninetti as The Elder Brother - Pierre
- Melvil Poupaud as The Younger Brother - Paul
- Lisa Faulkner as Helene Lagonelle
- Xiem Mang as The Chinese Man's Father
- Philippe Le Dem as The French Teacher
- Ann Schaufuss as Anne-Marie Stretter
- Jeanne Moreau as Narrator (voice)

== Soundtrack ==
The Lover: Original Motion Picture Soundtrack

Film score by Gabriel Yared
- Released: 13 October 1992
- Length: 39:14
- Label: Varèse Sarabande Records

All music is composed by Gabriel Yared.

Track listing
No.	Title	Length
1.	"A Kiss On The Window"	01:45
2.	"Blue Zoon"	02:46
3.	"One Day On The Mekong"	03:31
4.	"One Step Dance"	02:09
5.	"Promenade"	03:35
6.	"A Man From Cholon"	01:25
7.	"Helene"	02:37
8.	"Valse a L'Etage"	01:50
9.	"The Problems Of Life"	02:26
10.	"Foxtrot Dance"	02:27
11.	"The Lover"	03:11
12.	"Habanera"	01:48
13.	"The Barricades"	00:58
14.	"Nocturne"	03:51
15.	"La Marseillaise"	01:13
16.	"The Departure"	03:42
Total length:		39:14

== Production ==
Director Jean-Jacques Annaud initially collaborated with Marguerite Duras on the adaptation of her book, but creative differences between the pair led to Annaud working with writer Gérard Brach instead. Annaud and Brach changed the age of "The Girl" from 15 1/2 to 17 before deciding they would have her state in the beginning she is 15 while lying to her lover that she is 17, but tried to maintain the original structure and literary tone of the original novel. As with the Duras novel, none of the characters use names and are referred to in the credits as "The Girl" and "The Man". To find the actress who would play the girl, Annaud advertised in multiple cities in the United States and the United Kingdom and visited drama schools. However, it was Annaud's wife, Laurence Duval Annaud, who came upon a photograph of Jane March, a 16-year-old British model, in a teen fashion magazine and brought her to his attention.

When filming began 14 January 1991, March was two months away from turning 18. Annaud chose to shoot the film in English instead of French in order to secure international distribution and to accommodate the actress.

Annaud first flew to Ho Chi Minh City in Vietnam in 1989 to view the original novel's setting, but was greatly disappointed at the state of the country. In an interview with the Los Angeles Times, he stated that the "best colonial hotel" offered "rats as big as this running through the corridors, spiders everywhere, and no air conditioning, of course. When we tried to use the sink, three drops of brown water—I presume from the Red River—came out of the faucet." He initially decided against filming in the country and began scouting locations in Malaysia, Thailand and the Philippines—all countries that have been used as settings to represent Vietnam in other Western films. A year later, he returned to his original choice, feeling no other country could truly represent the "tired museum". According to Annaud and MGM Studios, it was the first Western film to be shot in the country since the reunification of the country in 1975. The government welcomed the crew, providing them with a governmental helicopter for use during filming. However, the filmmakers were required to clear all production storyboards with officials before they could be filmed, and an official remained on set at all times. All of the film's sexual scenes had to be shot in Paris as officials forbade them to be filmed on location. It took 135 days to complete filming, and due to the importation costs of shooting in Vietnam, the film cost $30 million to produce.

== Release ==
After its completion, the film was first screened in Saigon where it was well received by the "morally minded" Vietnamese guests and praised the dignified portrayal of the Asian male lead. The Lover debuted theatrically in France on 22 January 1992. Its first English release came in the United Kingdom on 19 June 1992. The film was licensed for release in the United States by MGM Studios, but for its theatrical debut, it first had to get past opposition by the Motion Picture Association of America. The organization gave the original film an MPAA rating of NC-17 and this version was shown in limited release in New York art house cinema. MGM appealed after cutting 12 minutes of the film. Coupled with pleas from Annaud, MGM, and a sex educator who argued that the cut version was no more illicit than the 1992 sexual thriller Basic Instinct, the film's rating was changed to R. The R film was released in American theaters on 30 October 1992.

Jane March was forced to deny rumours from British tabloids that she and Tony Leung Ka-fai did not simulate their sex scenes. Jean-Jacques Annaud had falsely implied the sex was real to boost publicity for the film, saying "Whether it is simulated or experienced is of little importance to me," leading the tabloids to trumpet the rumour on their front pages for days. The publicity became so difficult for March and her family that she had a nervous breakdown and fled to the Seychelles to escape scrutiny. Annaud later admitted the sex was not real, saying "I myself am flattered people believed [the sex]. But after a while it became embarrassing. I stopped doing press in England. It was a no-win situation."

=== Box office ===
The film was a box office success in France, taking in 626,891 admissions its opening weekend and playing in a total of 229 theaters. In total the film received 3,156,124 admissions in France, becoming the seventh-highest-grossing film of 1992. In the United States, The Lover grossed $4,899,194 in box office receipts during a limited release to 103 theaters. In the United Kingdom, it grossed £1,376,000.

== Home media ==
The LaserDisc was released in the United States on June 16, 1993. An uncut version of the film was released to Region 1 DVD on 11 December 2001 with audio tracks in English and French and subtitles in English, French, and Spanish.

The Lover was released on Blu-ray in Germany in 2011 under the title Der Liebhaber. It is not region locked and comes with subtitle and audio tracks available in German and English. It received a FSK ab 12 freigegeben rating.

== Critical response ==
On Rotten Tomatoes, The Lover holds a 28% approval rating based on 25 reviews, with an average rating of 4.8/10. Metacritic, which uses a weighted average, assigned the film a score of 59 out of 100, based on 25 critics, indicating "mixed or average" reviews.

Vincent Canby of The New York Times praised the film, calling it "something of a triumph" and a "tough, clear-eyed, utterly unsentimental" film that was "produced lavishly but with such discipline that the exotic locale never gets in the way of the minutely detailed drama at the center." He also complimented the performances of Tony Leung and Jane March, noting she is "wonderful" and a "nymphet beauty" in her film debut. The staff of Variety praised Leung's performance as well, writing that he "is excellent as the shiftless scion whose love for the girl makes him emotionally naked and vulnerable." David Ansen of Newsweek wrote: "The Lover's rarefied sensibility takes getting used to; once its spell is cast, you won't want to blink."

Roger Ebert of the Chicago Sun-Times compared the film to Emmanuelle or the Playboy and Penthouse erotic videos, "in which beautiful actors and elegant photography provide a soft-core sensuality. As an entry in that genre, The Lover is more than capable, and the movie is likely to have a long life on video as the sort of sexy entertainment that arouses but does not embarrass." He continued, "Is The Lover any good as a serious film? Not really. Annaud and his collaborators have got all of the physical details just right, but there is a failure of the imagination here; we do not sense the presence of real people behind the attractive facades of the two main actors."

Desson Thomson of the Washington Post observed, "Director Jean-Jacques Annaud and adapter Gerard Brach provide more than a few effective moments...But the story is dramatically not that interesting. After establishing the affair and its immediate problems, Lover never quite rises to the occasion. Scratch away the steamy, evocative surface, remove Jeanne Moreau's veteran-voiced narration, and you have only art-film banalities."

Owen Gleiberman of Entertainment Weekly gave the film a grade of C, calling it "one more movie that titillates us with the prospect of taking sex seriously and then dampens our interest by taking it too seriously. Why do so many filmmakers insist on staging erotic encounters as if they were some sort of hushed religious ritual? The answer, of course, is that they're trying to dignify sex. But sex isn't dignified — it's messy and playful and abandoned. In The Lover, director Jean-Jacques Annaud gives us the sweating and writhing without the spontaneity and surprise."

In the United Kingdom, Channel 4 wrote "the nameless characters bring to mind Last Tango's search for identity through passion, and there's a shade of Ai No Corrida's intensity. But there is none of the substance that made those two films such landmarks of their genre, and while March and Leung are an attractive pair, the glossy look and aloof direction of the film leaves you cold." The critic for Time Out London thought its "sombre quality dignifies an otherwise shoddily directed movie" that is "basically a melancholic piece about the remembrance of times, places and passions lost." The critic felt the role of the Young Girl was "altogether too complex for the inexperienced March to do more than simply embody."

Marguerite Duras distanced herself from the finished film and said she wrote another version of the book in response to Annaud's adaptation.

== Accolades ==
The Lover was nominated for the 1992 Academy Award for Best Cinematography and won the 1993 Motion Picture Sound Editors' Golden Reel Award for "Best Sound Editing — Foreign Feature". At the 1993 César Awards in France, it was nominated for seven awards, winning in the category of Best Original Music for Gabriel Yared's score.
