= Ryan Arnold =

Canadian pair skater

Personal information
- Full name: Ryan Arnold
- Born: September 18, 1984 (age 42) Huntsville, Ontario
- Height: 1.75 m (5 ft 9 in)

Figure skating career
- Country: Canada
- Skating club: Barrie FSC

Ryan Arnold (born September 18, 1984) is a Canadian pair skater. He competed with Carla Montgomery and Meagan Duhamel. In both partnerships, he was coached by Lee Barkell.

With Montgomery, Arnold qualified twice for the Junior Grand Prix Final and twice placed in the top ten at the World Junior Championships.

He teamed up with Meagan Duhamel in the spring of 2004. They were the first pair to land a side-by-side triple Lutz jump in competition, which they achieved at the 2005 Canadian Figure Skating Championships. At the 2005 World Junior Figure Skating Championships, they became the first team to land a throw triple Lutz jump in international competition.

Arnold also competed as a single skater on the national level and on the junior level internationally.

== Programs ==
=== With Duhamel ===
Season	Short program	Free skating
2005–2006	Quixote by Bond	Un homme et son péché by Michel Cusson
2004–2005	Adagio by Remo Giazotto, Tomaso Albinoni	Concierto de Aranjuez by Joaquín Rodrigo; Leyenda by Andy Hill performed by Vanessa-Mae

=== With Montgomery ===
Season	Short program	Free skating
2002–2003	Clubbed to Death (from The Matrix) by Rob Dougan	Dragonheart by Randy Edelman
2001–2002	A Whiter Shade of Pale by G. Brooker and K. Reid	Happy Valley 1997 Re-Unification Overture by Vanessa-Mae and A. Hill; Farewell (from Crouching Tiger, Hidden Dragon) by Tan Dun performed by Yo-Yo Ma

== Competitive highlights ==
=== Pair skating with Duhamel ===
International
Event	2004–05	2005–06
Golden Spin of Zagreb		1st
Nebelhorn Trophy		2nd
International: Junior
World Junior Champ.	8th	
JGP Serbia	5th	
National
Canadian Championships	8th	6th

=== Single skating ===
International
Event	2003–04	2004–05
JGP Croatia	9th	
National
Canadian Championships		19th

=== Pair skating with Montgomery ===
International
Event	2001–02	2002–03
World Junior Champ.	5th	6th
JGP Final	4th	6th
JGP China		4th
JGP France		1st
JGP Japan	1st	
JGP Netherlands	1st	
National
Canadian Championships	1st J.	6th
