= April Meservy =

American singer

- Born: Reno, Nevada, U.S.
- Occupations: Singer; songwriter; multi-instrumentalist; record producer
- Years active: 2004–present
- Spouse: David GrandPre (m. 2018)
- Musical career
- Genres: Pop music; Folk music
- Instruments: Vocals; guitar; piano
- Label: Forêt d'Musique
- Website: aprilmeservy.com

April Meservy (/mɪˈsɜːrvi/ mih-SUR-vee) is an independent singer/songwriter.

== History ==
Meservy performed in Salt Lake City's Olympic Square during the 2002 Winter Olympics.

She self-released her first album, Somewhere Between Sunsets, in early 2010, on her Forêt d'Musique (Jèrriais: "Forest of Music") label.

In 2017, her cover of U2's "With or Without You" was selected by Canadian pair figure skaters Eric Radford and Meagan Duhamel for their short program for the season and into the 2018 PyeongChang Winter Olympic Games, where they won team gold and individual bronze medals. Meservy's rendition reached the Top 40 on iTunes.

In 2018, she released an EP, The Good-Morrow.

In 2019, she starred as Charity Barnum, alongside Sam Humphrey, Chelsea Caso, Martha Nichols, Mishay Petronelli, Luciano Acuna Jr., and David Osmond, in a special production of The Greatest Showman, featuring live performances synchronized with film footage.

== Discography ==
=== Albums ===
- The Good-Morrow EP (2018)
  - "The Quiet Life" (Kasey Chambers cover song)
  - "Murder in the City" (Avett Brothers cover song)
  - "Angel" (Sarah McLachlan cover song)
  - "Fix You" (Coldplay cover song)
- Somewhere Between Sunsets (2010)
  - "Truth Speak"
  - "Not Going Under"
  - "Rainstorms & Calypso Rings"
  - "Marks of my Path (Mountain)"
  - "I Like Mondays"
  - "Looks Like Change"
  - "Decide"
  - "Will She"
  - "More of Less"
  - "All That I Can Be"
  - "Unbroken"
  - "I'll Sleep"

=== Released singles ===
- "Times" (2019)
- "Make You Feel My Love" (Bob Dylan cover) (2019)
- "With or Without You" (U2 cover) (2017)
- "I'll Be Home for Christmas" (2017)
- "Home Means Nevada" (SIERRA SUNSET MIX) (2017)
- "Home Means Nevada" (SAGE MIX) (2016)
- "Winter" (2008)
- "What Child Is This?" (2006)

=== Compilation albums ===
- The Best of Efy 2004-2006 (2007) - "The Light", "I Know He Lives"
- A Child's Prayer (2006) - "Mary's Lullaby"
- The Greatest Gift: Especially For Youth 2006 (2006) - "Light Will Rise"
- Stand in the Light: Especially For Youth 2004 (2004) - "The Light"

== Music videos ==
List of music videos, showing year released and director
Title	Details	Director(s)
"Looks Like Change"	Released 2013; Label: Forêt d'Musique; Format: Digital	Douglas A. Johnson
"Looks Like Change (Cuddly Critters Cut)"	Released 2013; Label: Forêt d'Musique; Format: Digital	Produced by Doug A. Johnson
"Truth Speak"	Released 2015; Label: Forêt d'Musique; Format: Digital	Produced by Dave Skousen & April Meservy
"What Child is This"	Released 2016; Label: Forêt d'Musique; Format: Digital	Produced by Doug A. Johnson & April Meservy
"I'll Be Home for Christmas"	Released 2017; Label: Forêt d'Musique; Format: Digital	Produced by Doug Johnson, Dave Skousen, & April Meservy

== Music label ==
In 2007, Meservy started an independent music label, Forêt d'Musique, (Jèrriais: "Forest of Music") to release her music.

== Personal life ==
On August 3, 2018, Meservy married David GrandPre in the Payson Utah Temple.
