= Clémence Saint-Preux =

French singer (born 1988)

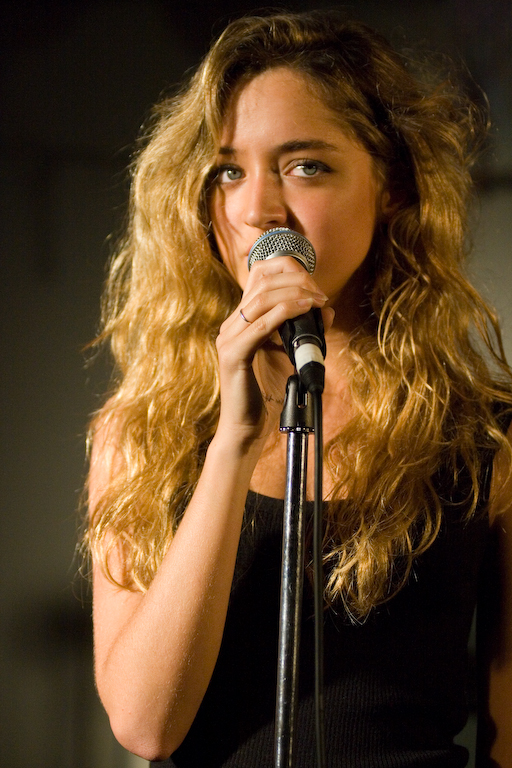
- Clémence at the "London Calling" concert of SellaBand, 2007.
- Born: November 29, 1988 (age 37); Neuilly-sur-Seine
- Website: www.clemence.fr

Clémence Saint-Preux (Neuilly-sur-Seine, November 29, 1988), who uses the stage name Clémence, is a French singer. She is the youngest daughter of the well known composer Saint-Preux. In France she became well known in 2000 while singing with Johnny Hallyday and later with Jean-Baptiste Maunier. In 2007 she received international attention by raising enough financial support on Sellaband. In 2011 she obtained a small role in the movie Perfect Baby as Amy.

== Biography ==
The daughter of composer Saint Preux and a painter/author mother, Clémence, from a young age, grew up in an artistic world, making it only natural for her to turn towards music and singing early in her life, learning piano and guitar and taking lessons in dance and comedy. When she was 12 years of age, the young girl met Johnny Hallyday. Enchanted by her voice, he recorded the song On a tous besoin d'amour with her. The song garnered great success in France (it attained 4th place on the top 50 in November 2001). Nevertheless, she had to wait until 2005 to be recognized at the fore of the music scene.

That year, she took part in a duet with Jean-Baptiste Maunier – who had also then just made his glowing debut with the success of Les Choristes – releasing the single Concerto pour deux voix. The song, which compares itself more to a vocal exercise because of the absence of words, is an adaptation of Concerto pour une Voix (Concerto for One Voice), composed by Saint Preux in 1969. The success was once more that of a partnership, however, and at the end of 2005, Clémence released a solo single, Sans défense (Without Defense), followed by La vie comme elle vient the following year.

On 18 March 2007, Clémence became the fourth artist to reach a grand total of $50,000 in "parts" sold on Sellaband, thereby allowing her to start recording an album.

Her first album, entitled Mes Jours (My Days), was recorded to follow directly after and scheduled to appear in shops in France on 12 December 2007. Clémence wrote three of the fourteen songs on the disc herself.

She has starred in a film called Perfect Baby, starring Jean-Baptiste Maunier, Deng Chao and Jane March.

Clémence married Joachim Lellouche in March 2017.

== Discography ==
=== Singles ===
- 2001 : On a tous besoin d'amour (with Johnny Hallyday)
- 2002 : Un seul mot d'amour
- 2005 : Concerto pour deux voix (with Jean-Baptiste Maunier)
- 2005 : Sans défense
- 2006 : La vie comme elle vient
- 2007 : Où es-tu
- 2013 : Sous les Sunlights des Tropiques
- 2013 : Cry Myself to sleep

=== Albums ===
- 2008 : Mes Jours [French Version]
- 2008 : Bewitching [English Version]
