= Les Petits Chanteurs de Saint-Marc =

Les Petits Chanteurs de Saint-Marc (English: The Little Singers of Saint Marc) was a children's choir, founded in September 1986 by Nicolas Porte. It was a mixed unit composed of seventy-five to eighty school-aged children from ten to fifteen years old. All were provided education from the Saint-Marc college in Lyon.

== Admittance ==
Children joined the choir in the sixth grade. After three years of training, they were integrated into The Holy-Ursule School. The school, on the same site as the Saint-Marc college, enrolled children in preparation for admittance into the college.

The choir belonged to the French Federation of Little Singers (French: Fédération française des petits chanteurs), itself a part of the Fédération internationale des Pueri Cantores.

The choir's repertoire varied widely from spiritual hymns to classical and contemporary music.

The children received special training in musical theory, harmony, choir singing, chamber music and more. No prior musical knowledge was required upon entry to the choir. The students practiced between six and eight hours a week, with increased times according to concerts and performances.

== Les Choristes ==
Les Petits Chanteurs acquired recognition with the release of the 2004 film Les Choristes, for which they provided the vocals for the soundtrack. One of the soloists, Jean-Baptiste Maunier was chosen to play a lead role in the film.

The choir held a performance, entitled Les Choristes en concert in which they sang a variety of songs, including several from the film. Jean-Baptiste Maunier and Emmanuel Lizé were the boy soloists for the concert. After Maunier's departure from the choir, Lizé moved to first soloist and his prior spot was filled by Rabi Ramadan.

== Other works ==
In addition to performances where they sung music from the film, the choir also performed Mozart's opera-comedy, Bastien and Bastienne.

In 1995, the choir was named the official choir of the Basilica Notre-Dame de Fourvière. The choir performed in France as well as abroad, giving performances in China, Canada, Hong Kong, Russia, the United Kingdom, Lebanon, Japan, the United States and more. They also performed at festivals and gave their patronage to humanitarian organizations.

== See also ==
- List of choirs
