= Saint-Preux =

French composer

Saint-Preux (born August 1948) is a French composer of contemporary classical music which also combines elements from popular music and electronic music. His real name is Christian Désiré Langlade.

== Biography ==
Saint-Preux grew up in the small village of Mervent en Vendée. By 1968 he had already released several 45 rpm recordings of his compositions, including Une étrange musique (A Strange Music) which reached #71 on the French charts that year. In August 1969, he took part in Poland's Sopot International Song Festival with his first major composition La valse de l'enfance (The Waltz of Youth). The song was Luxembourg's entry in the festival and was sung by Henri Seroka with Saint-Preux conducting the symphony orchestra. The song won the Grand Prix de la Presse award at the festival and was released in that same year on Seroka (Festival FX 1583) and as a single on the EMI/Odeon label. While in Poland he composed what was to become his biggest hit, Concerto pour une Voix (Concerto for One Voice).

When Saint-Preux returned to France, René Boyer, head of the music publishers Fantasia, took him under his wing and arranged to have Concerto pour une Voix recorded. Although originally written as a purely instrumental work for trumpet and strings, Saint-Preux heard the French singer, Danielle Licari rehearsing in another studio and decided to record it with her voice taking the part of the trumpet using a vocalise technique (similar to scat singing in jazz). The song, released on the Disc'AZ label in 1969, made both her career and his. In a few months it had sold over 3,000,000 copies in France alone, and gained recognition outside France as well. In the week of August 22, 1970, it entered the charts in Mexico at #10 and Japan at #20, eventually winning a Gold disc and a Japanese "Oscar" for the best original music. In 1970 Dalida recorded an adaptation of the song for Barclay Records with lyrics specially written for it by Eddy Marnay. Dalida's version is also known as "Chaque Nuit", the first line of the lyrics. Since that time Concerto pour une voix has been recorded by many other musicians, including Maxim Saury, Caravelli, Aimable Pluchard, and Raymond Lefèvre. An excerpt from the original Licari version appears in Wyclef Jean's 1997 album The Carnival, and the song was also performed in André Rieu's 2007/2008 In Wonderland tour. In the Rieu show, Concerto pour une Voix was performed by a woman dressed as an angel singing from high above the orchestra.

In 1972 Saint-Preux was signed by CBS France, and by 1973 he was listed as one of the artists on its roster who had achieved "consistent chart success". During the 1970s he released several LP albums, including Concerto, containing the Concerto pour une Voix sung by Danielle Licari as well as several other tracks of instrumental music with the trumpeter Pierre Thibaud and flautist Michel Plockyn as soloists and Saint-Preux on the piano. The title song from his 1975 album Your Hair, inspired by Baudelaire's prose poem Un Hemisphere dans une chevelure and sung by French vocalist André Allet, reached #1 in the French charts.

Two of Saint-Preux's larger scale works were his Symphonie pour la Pologne (Symphony for Poland), recorded in 1977 with the Polish Radio Symphony Orchestra, and Les Cris de la liberté (The Cries of Liberty). Saint-Preux composed Les Cris de la liberté, an hour long hymn to peace and human rights, to aid humanitarian projects. It was first performed on July 14, 1989, at the Place de la Concorde during the celebrations for the bicentennial of the French Revolution. During this event Saint-Preux met Pope John Paul II, to whom he also dedicated the work. In 2005, Saint-Preux adapted Concerto pour une Voix for two singers. This latter version, Concerto pour deux Voix (Concerto for Two Voices), was recorded in 2005 by the composer's daughter Clémence and Jean-Baptiste Maunier who starred in the film, Les Choristes. Clémence is also the soloist on Saint Preux's album Jeanne la Romantique (released in 2009).

== Discography ==
- Concerto pour une voix (1969)
- Le piano sous la mer (1972)
- La passion (1973)
- La fête triste (1974)
- Your hair & Missa Amoris (1975)
- Concerto pour piano (1975)
- Samara (1976)
- Symphonie pour la Pologne (1977)
- Expressions (1978)
- To be or not (1980)
- Le piano d'Abigaïl (1983)
- Atlantis (1983)
- Odyssée (1986)
- Phytandros (1991)
- The last opera (1994)
- Free Yourself (1999)
- Concerto pour deux voix (2005)
- Jeanne la Romantique (2007)
- Le Désir (2009)
