= Concerto pour une Voix =

Song by Danielle Licari

from the album Concerto pour une Voix
- Published: 1969
- Released: 1969
- Genre: contemporary classical music
- Length: 4:00
- Label: Sony, Disc'AZ
- Songwriter: Saint-Preux

Concerto pour une Voix (Concerto for one Voice) is a contemporary classical song written by the French composer Saint-Preux in 1969, combining elements from popular music and electronic music. The piece was first sung by Danielle Licari.

== History ==
Saint-Preux composed the Concerto, his biggest hit, in Poland, where he had been very well seen by the criticism after defending in August 1969, in the Sopot International Song Festival, La valse de l'enfance (The Waltz of Youth) with Saint-Preux conducting the symphony orchestra.

When Saint-Preux returned to France, René Boyer, head of the music publishers Fantasia, arranged Concerto pour une Voix and recorded it. Danielle Licari sang it using a vocalise technique similar to scat singing in jazz. The song, released on the Disc'AZ label in 1969, made both her career and his. In a few months it had sold over 3,000,000 copies in France alone, and gained recognition outside France as well. In the week of 22 August 1970 it entered the charts in Mexico at #10 and Japan at #20, He won Gold disc and a Japanese "Oscar" for the best original music.

Since that time Concerto pour une voix has been recorded by many other musicians, including Maxim Saury, Caravelli, Aimable Pluchard, and Raymond Lefèvre. An excerpt from the original Licari version appears in Wyclef Jean's 1997 album The Carnival, and the song was also performed in André Rieu's 2007/2008 In Wonderland tour. In the Rieu show, Concerto pour une Voix was performed by Mirusia Louwerse dressed as an angel singing from high above the orchestra.

In 2005, Saint-Preux adapted Concerto pour une Voix for two singers. This latter version, Concerto pour deux Voix (Concerto for Two Voices), was recorded in 2005 by the composer's daughter Clémence and Jean-Baptiste Maunier who starred in the film, Les Choristes.

== Arrangements ==
This song has seen dozens of arrangements and recordings.

- Sung by Raymond Lefèvre, 1977
- Sung by Mirla Castellanos, 1974
- Sung by Dalida, 1970
- Sung by Giorgia Fumanti, 2010
- Sung by Jean-Baptiste Maunier and Clemence, 2011
- Sung by Zhou Shen, 2022
