= The Chorus (2004 film) =

2004 French musical drama film

- French theatrical release poster
- Directed by: Christophe Barratier
- Written by: Christophe Barratier; Philippe Lopes-Curval
- Based on: A Cage of Nightingales
- Produced by: Arthur Cohn; Jacques Perrin; Nicolas Mauvernay
- Starring: Gérard Jugnot; François Berléand; Kad Merad; Jean-Baptiste Maunier
- Cinematography: Jean-Jacques Bouhon; Dominique Gentil; Carlo Varini
- Edited by: Yves Deschamps
- Music by: Bruno Coulais
- Production companies: Vega Film; Canal+ France 2 Cinéma; Galatée Films; Novo Arturo Films; Pathé Renn Productions
- Distributed by: Pathé Distribution (France, United Kingdom and Ireland); Constantin Film (Germany and Austria); Vega Film (Switzerland)
- Release date: 17 March 2004
- Running time: 96 minutes
- Countries: France; Germany; Switzerland
- Language: French
- Budget: $5.3 million
- Box office: $83.6 million

The Chorus (French: Les Choristes, pronounced [le kɔʁist], lit. 'The Choristers') is a 2004 German-French-Swiss musical drama film directed by Christophe Barratier. Co-written by Barratier and Philippe Lopes-Curval, it is an adaptation of the 1945 film A Cage of Nightingales (La Cage aux rossignols). The story is inspired by the origin of the boys' choir the Little Singers of Paris.

At the 77th Academy Awards, The Chorus was nominated for Best Foreign Language Film and Best Original Song (the latter for "Vois sur ton chemin", listed as "Look to Your Path", composed by Bruno Coulais).

== Plot ==
In 2004, Pierre Morhange, a famed French conductor performing in the United States, is informed before a concert that his mother has died. After the performance, he returns to his home in France for her funeral. An old friend named Pépinot arrives at his door with a diary which belonged to their teacher, Clément Mathieu. They proceed to read it together.

In 1949, fifty-four years earlier, Clément Mathieu, a failed musician, arrives at Fond de l'Étang ("Bottom of the Pond"), a French boarding school for troubled boys of all ages, to work as a supervisor and music teacher. At the gate, he sees a very young boy, Pépinot, waiting for Saturday, when he says his father will pick him up. Mathieu later learns that his parents were killed in the Second World War during the Nazi occupation of France, but Pépinot is unaware of this.

Mathieu discovers the boys being ruthlessly punished by the very strict headmaster, Rachin and attempts to use humour and kindness to win them over. When a booby trap set by one of the boys, Le Querrec, injures the school's elderly caretaker, Maxence, Mathieu keeps the culprit's identity from the headmaster, while encouraging Le Querrec to nurse Maxence during his recovery.

On discovering the boys singing rude songs about him, Mathieu forms a plan: he will teach them to sing and form a choir as a form of discipline. He groups the boys according to their voice types, but one student, Pierre Morhange, refuses to sing. Mathieu catches Morhange singing to himself, discovers he has a wonderful singing voice and awards him solo parts on the condition that he behaves.

Morhange's single mother, Violette, arrives at the school. When Mathieu goes to explain that Morhange cannot be visited because he has been locked up as a punishment, he finds himself pitying and being attracted to the boy's beleaguered mother and instead tells her that Morhange is at the dentist. Meanwhile, a cruel, uncontrollable boy named Mondain arrives and begins causing trouble by bullying the others, influencing others to be like him and generally being rebellious. After stealing a watch, he is locked up for two weeks.

The choir is improving rapidly with Morhange as its lead soloist; the children are happier, and the faculty less strict — even Rachin begins to loosen up, playing football with the boys and making a paper aeroplane. After Mondain is released from lock-up, he runs away and seemingly steals all the school's money. After Mondain is apprehended, Rachin repeatedly slaps him, until Mondain in turn attempts to strangle Rachin. Rachin hands Mondain over to the police, still not knowing the location of the stolen money, and disbands the choir. Mathieu begins teaching his choir "underground", practising at night in their dormitory.

Mathieu continues to meet Morhange's mother, who is unaware of his attraction to her. He plans to help her son win a scholarship to the music conservatory in Lyon. One day she blithely informs him that she has met someone: an engineer. Mathieu is dejected but expresses his feigned happiness and watches her leave in the engineer's car.

The Countess, a sponsor of the school, finds out about the choir; they perform before her and others, and Morhange enchants the audience with his solo. Mathieu discovers that another boy, Corbin, stole the money that Mondain was accused of taking. Despite this, Rachin refuses to accept Mondain back at the school, especially after Mathieu refuses to reveal who the real culprit is.

When Rachin departs to accept an award from the board after taking credit for the choir, Mathieu and Maxence suspend classes and take the boys on an outing. While they are out, Mondain returns and sets fire to the school. Mathieu is fired for breaking the rules, even though he saved the boys' lives, and Maxence is suspended. As Mathieu leaves, the boys —forbidden to say goodbye — lock themselves in their classroom, sing and throw farewell messages out of the window on paper planes. Touched, Mathieu walks away, musing about how he has failed and nobody knows of his existence.

Back in the present, the adult Morhange finishes reading the diary and recounts what happened afterwards: he won his scholarship to the conservatory, and Rachin was fired after his abuse towards the students was exposed. Mathieu, Pépinot relates, continued to give music lessons quietly for the rest of his life.

The final scene (in the past again) shows Mathieu waiting for his bus after being fired. As he boards it, he looks back and finds Pépinot running after him, insisting that he come too. Initially, Mathieu refuses because it is not allowed, and he leaves Pépinot behind. Suddenly, the bus stops and Mathieu gives in: the two board the bus together. Pépinot finally got his wish, for he and Mathieu left on a Saturday, and Mathieu raised him.

== Cast ==
- Gérard Jugnot as Clement Mathieu, a supervisor and failed musician
- François Berléand as Rachin, the strict headmaster of Fond de L'Étang
- Jean-Baptiste Maunier as Pierre Morhange, a poorly behaved boy with a beautiful singing voice
  - Jacques Perrin as adult Morhange, now a popular conductor
- Maxence Perrin as Pépinot, a young boy who refuses to believe his parents are dead
  - Didier Flamand as adult Pépinot
- Kad Merad as Chabert, a physical education teacher
- Jean-Paul Bonnaire as Maxence, the school's elderly caretaker
- Marie Bunel as Violette Morhange, the single mother of Pierre
- Grégory Gatignol as Pascal Mondain, a troubled and malevolent older boy who smokes
- Cyril Bernicot as Le Querrec, the perpetrator of a booby trap which injures Maxence

== Production ==
=== Development ===
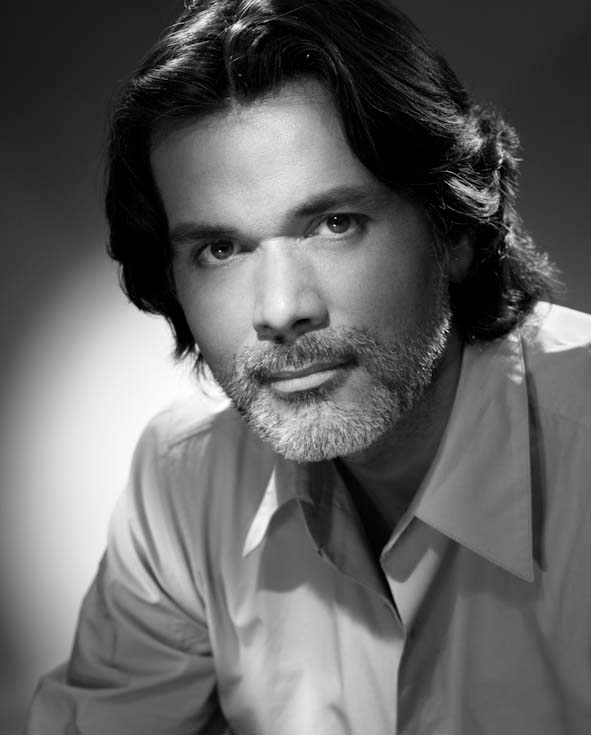
The Chorus was director Christophe Barratier's first feature film.

After making the short film Les Tombales, director Christophe Barratier was looking for a subject for his first feature film. He noticed that many of his ideas were linked to his childhood, and the emotions he felt between the ages of four and eight. Coming from a musical background, he also wanted to tell a story linked to music. The themes of childhood and music made him think of the film La Cage aux rossignols, which he had seen on television at a young age and which "touched [him] profoundly". Barratier told his idea to Gérard Jugnot, whom he had known for quite a long time and with whom he shared a taste for old French cinema and actors such as Noël-Noël; Jugnot liked it but thought that the film would have to be set in the past, otherwise his character would be transformed into someone who "teaches rapping in the suburbs". Barratier said he did not think about setting the film in the present time because "Clément Mathieu [would have] other priorities, he would have nothing in common with a 1950s music teacher". Barratier then began writing the script; Jugnot said that the first version somewhat "lacked roughness", and co-writer Philippe Lopes-Curval got involved. He collaborated with Barratier to strengthen the story and develop the psychology of characters such as Rachin—for whom the children are "the symbol of a failed professional life"—and Chabert.

=== Casting ===
The director was keen that the role of the young Pierre Morhange should be played by a real singer, and the search for him was tedious. While touring large French choirs to choose the one to record the film's soundtrack, they discovered the 12-year-old Jean-Baptiste Maunier of Les Petits Chanteurs de Saint-Marc: Barratier described his voice as "exceptional and very moving", and composer Bruno Coulais said it was "incredible". They decided to cast him as Morhange and use the choir for the soundtrack, but that the rest of the choir would not play his classmates because the director did not want them to be professional actors. Instead, they looked for children near the filming location in Auvergne: casting director Sylvie Brocheré visited primary and secondary schools in Clermont-Ferrand, looking for children between the ages of six and 15. After over 2000 auditions, the roles were cast. Of all the children, only the Parisians Théodule Carré Cassaigne and Thomas Blumenthal had some small acting experience.

=== Filming ===
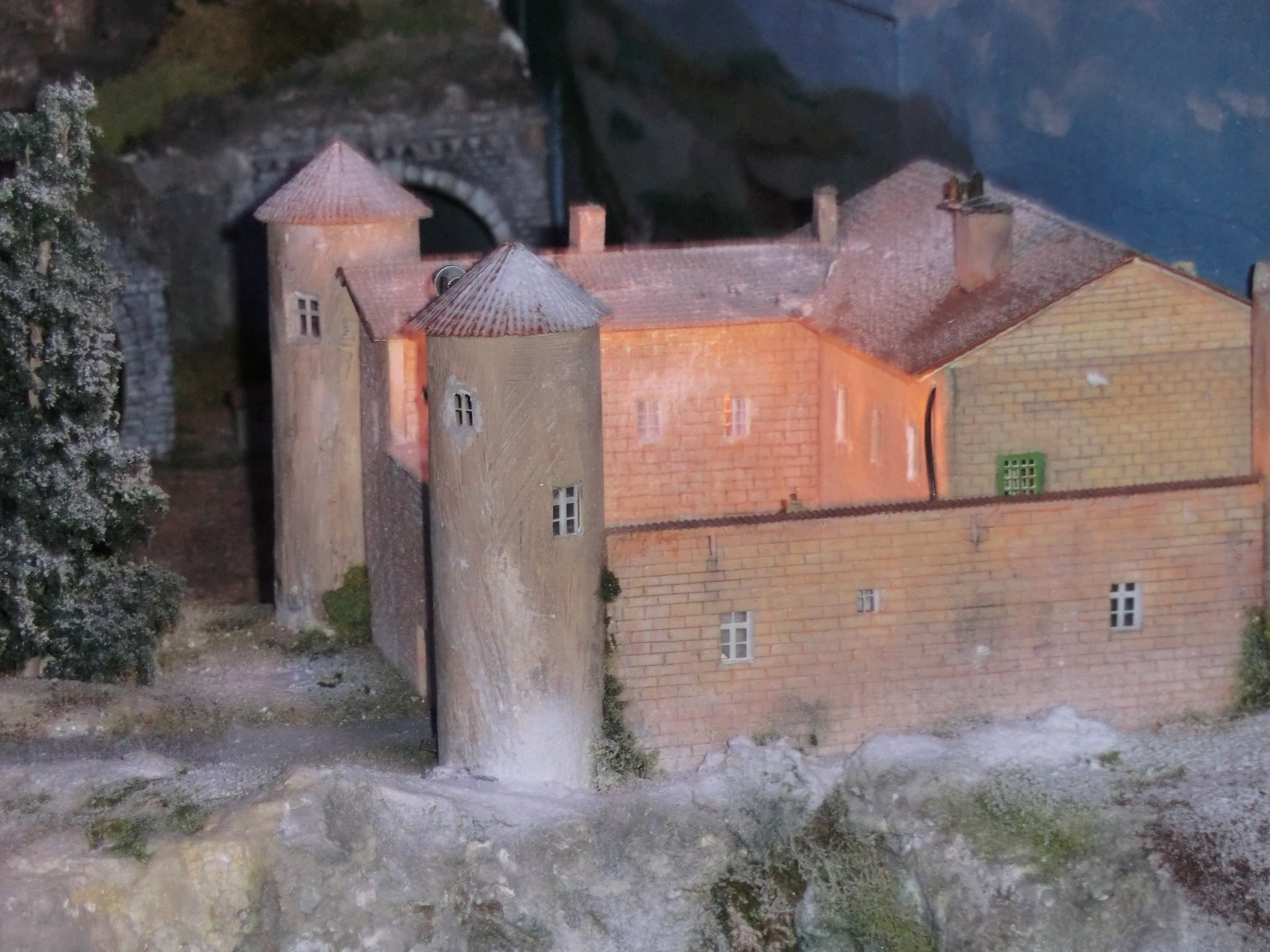
A model of the boarding school featured in the film at a miniature railway museum in Châtillon-sur-Chalaronne

Principal photography took place on location at the Château de Ravel in Puy-de-Dôme. Foam and salt were used as artificial snow and green leaves were removed from the grounds, since the beginning of the movie was filmed in the summer, but set in the winter. Fog machines were also used around the castle, and walls were deliberately scorched and stripped of paint to give the surroundings a "dilapidated" look, since boarding schools at the time often suffered from poor funding and management. When filming his first scene in which his character Mondain tries to intimidate Clément Mathieu, Gatignol had trouble behaving menacingly towards Jugnot, who described him as "too nice". For the scene in which Morhange drops ink on Mathieu's head, gouache was used. During choir scenes, song lyrics were written on large cue cards and the classroom's blackboard to aid actors. The children who played the choir described how their singing improved through the duration of the shoot; Nicolas Porte, the choirmaster of Les Petits Chanteurs de Saint-Marc, said that this "means that the story we tell is credible". Bruno Coulais, the composer of the film's score, said that the children "are passionate about music", which is "some kind of escape to them".

== Soundtrack ==
The soundtrack for The Chorus was released on 3 May 2004 by Warner Bros. Records, and subsequently by Nonesuch Records in 2005 and Varèse Sarabande in 2012. It features the film's original score, which was composed by Bruno Coulais and performed by the Bulgarian Symphony Orchestra (conducted by Deyan Pavlov) and the choir Les Petits Chanteurs de Saint-Marc. The album's 2012 release added five additional tracks, most of which are the orchestral backing tracks of other songs. Filmtracks summed it up by saying "for enthusiasts of boys' choirs and heartwarming, sentimental choral performances in general, The Chorus translates into a strong, albeit repetitive album." The soundtrack topped the albums chart in France for 11 weeks and reached number three in Belgium, before its United States release in early 2005. Around the same time, the live album Les Choristes en concert was released on both CD and DVD.

== Release ==
In the United States, the film was shown at multiple film festivals—including the Chicago International Film Festival, the Austin Film Festival, and the Heartland Film Festival—before opening in New York City and Los Angeles on 14 January 2005.

=== Box office ===
The film had a worldwide gross of $83,580,890 including $3,635,164 in the United States and Canada, $2,062,908 in the United Kingdom and $48,765,590 in its native France. It ranked 72 on the list of the highest-grossing films of 2005 worldwide, and 195 in the US and Canada.

=== Home media ===
The Chorus was released on DVD in France (as Les Choristes) on 27 October 2004 by Pathé. On 3 May 2005, Buena Vista Home Video released the film on DVD in the United States as The Chorus; on the same day, it was released by Alliance Films in Canada. On 11 July 2005, Pathé released a version with English subtitles in the United Kingdom.

== Reception ==
The Chorus received mixed to positive reviews from critics. Rotten Tomatoes gives it a 69% "Fresh" rating, based on 108 reviews, and an average rating of 6.5/10, indicating that most reviewed it positively, and summarises that "While predictable, this low-key heartwarmer manages to be uplifting without overdoing the sentiment." On Metacritic, the film holds an average score of 56 out of 100 based on 32 critics' reviews, indicating "mixed or average reviews".

Peter Howell of the Toronto Star commended the film's "credible acting and outstanding score", saying they allowed it to "[rise] above feelgood status". The BBC's Matthew Leyland said "even though all the notes are predictable, the film hits them with a wit, warmth and gusto." Many critics felt that the film's format was predictable, and it was widely compared to other films about inspirational teachers, such as Dead Poets Society, Goodbye, Mr. Chips and Mr. Holland's Opus; The Salt Lake Tribune commented "if you've seen one inspirational-teacher melodrama ... you've seen this one, too" and criticised the movie's "one-note characters" and "plodding predictability". Of the title characters, critic Roger Ebert said: "Their influence will forever change the lives of their students, and we can see that coming from the opening frame", and that The Chorus "should have added something new and unexpected". Ebert also commented that "This feels more like a Hollywood wannabe than a French film."

New York Times' Manohla Dargis wrote: "Like so many films ostensibly about children, 'The Chorus' isn't really interested in what kids think or what they want and why; the real point here is the adults, their passions, dreams and redemption."

== Awards and nominations ==
At the 77th Academy Awards, The Chorus was nominated for Best Foreign Language Film and Best Original Song (the latter for "Vois sur ton chemin", listed as "Look to Your Path").

Award	Category	Recipients	Result	Ref.
Academy Award	Best Foreign Language Film	The Chorus	Nominated	
Academy Award	Best Original Song	"Vois sur ton chemin"	Nominated	
British Academy Film Awards	Best Adapted Screenplay	Christophe Barratier, Philippe Lopes-Curval	Nominated	
British Academy Film Awards	Best Film Not in the English Language	The Chorus	Nominated	
British Academy Film Awards	Best Film Music	Bruno Coulais	Nominated	
César Awards	Best Sound	Nicolas Cantin, Nicolas Naegelen, Daniel Sobrino	Won	
César Awards	Best Music Written for a Film	Bruno Coulais	Won	
César Awards	Best Actor	Gérard Jugnot	Nominated	
César Awards	Best Debut	Christophe Barratier	Nominated	
César Awards	Best Director	Christophe Barratier	Nominated	
César Awards	Best Film	The Chorus	Nominated	
César Awards	Best Production Design	François Chauvaud	Nominated	
César Awards	Best Supporting Actor	François Berléand	Nominated	
European Film Awards	Best Composer	Bruno Coulais	Won	
European Film Awards	Best Actor	Gérad Jugnot	Nominated	
European Film Awards	Best Film	The Chorus	Nominated	
Golden Globe Awards	Best Foreign Language Film	The Chorus	Nominated	
Lumière Awards	Best Film	The Chorus	Nominated	
Young Artist Awards	Best Performance in an International Feature Film – Leading Young Performer	Jean-Baptiste Maunier	Nominated	
Young Artist Awards	Best International Feature Film	The Chorus	Nominated	

== Musical adaptation ==
In 2017, Christophe Barratier adapted the movie as a musical for the Folies Bergère in Paris.

== See also ==
- List of French films of 2004
- List of submissions to the 77th Academy Awards for Best Foreign Language Film
- List of French submissions for the Academy Award for Best Foreign Language Film
