= Jean-Baptiste Maunier =

French actor and singer (born 1990)

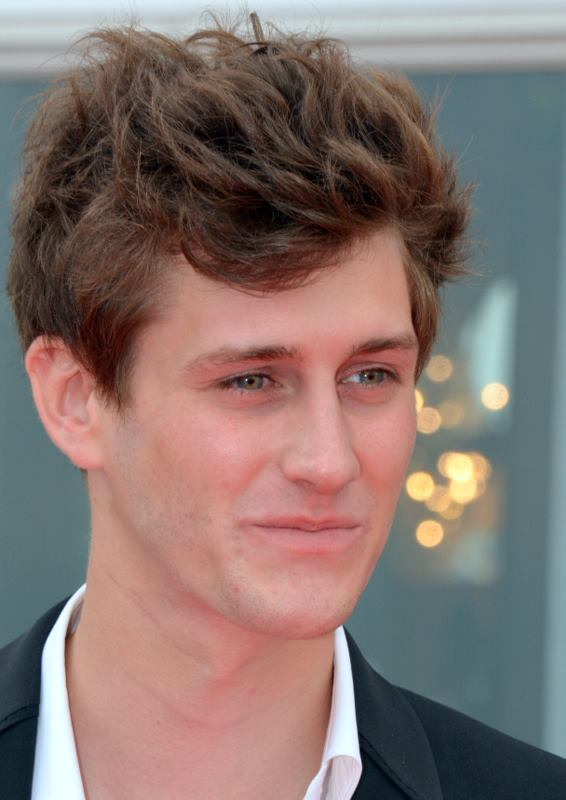
- Maunier in 2016
- Born: 22 December 1990 (age 35); Brignoles, Var, France
- Occupations: Actor; singer
- Years active: 2004–present
- Spouse: Léa Arnezeder
- Children: 2

Jean-Baptiste Maunier (French pronunciation: [ʒɑ̃ batist monje], born 22 December 1990) is a French actor and singer. He is best known for his role in the 2004 French film Les Choristes.

== Early life ==
Jean-Baptiste Maunier was born to Thierry Maunier, a cameraman, and Muriel Maunier. He has a younger brother, Benjamin. His father sang in a well-known church choir (Les Petits Chanteurs de Saint Marc). Jean-Baptiste attended a Roman Catholic school in Lyon, France. He studied at the Lee Strasberg Institute in New York between 2008 and 2009 to perfect his acting and English, returning to France to sing in Les Enfoirés charity concerts.

== Career ==
=== Acting career ===
Maunier gained fame for his starring role in the 2004 French film Les Choristes, in which he plays Pierre Morhange, a delinquent with an exceptional singing voice at the correctional school Fond de L'Étang. Christophe Barratier, the director of Les Choristes, chose Maunier because "he had the right look" and a marvellous voice. He was also exceptionally appealing for the role.

Following the release of the film, Maunier and the choir took part in numerous concerts all over the world, including Japan and Canada. In February 2005, he left the choir in order to devote more time to his studies and to his acting career. In April and August 2005, he took part in a four-episode television series for France 2, Le Cri, playing a young steelworker. The series was released in 2006.

Maunier appears in Le Grand Meaulnes (2006) as Francois Seurel. In Piccolo, Saxo et compagnie (2006), an animated film, he lent his voice to the character "Saxo". In the summer of 2006, Maunier acted in Hellphone, a full-length film directed by James Huth. In this film, Maunier plays the role of Sid. The film was released in March 2007. In L'Auberge rouge, directed by Gérard Krawczyk (an adaptation of the 1951 version) Maunier stars as Octave. It opened in theaters in France on 5 December 2007. Jean-Baptiste spent a year studying at New York's Lee Strasberg Institute in 2008 to unleash his acting potentials. Staying in the USA allowed him to perfect his English. He returned to France in 2010, and performed in the Enfoirés charity concert of 2010.

=== Singing career ===
Upon entering collège (middle school), Maunier was asked to make a choice between various activities. He chose singing and became a member of Les Petits Chanteurs de Saint-Marc (full name is "La Chorale des Petits Enfants De Saint-Marc"). In the choir, he was tutored by Nicolas Porte. In Les Choristes, the film that made him widely famous for his singing skills, both Maunier's solo and the chorus of "Les Petits Chanteurs de Saint-Marc" are featured on the original soundtrack.

In 2005, to keep a souvenir of his voice before it broke, Maunier decided to sing with Clemence Saint-Preux and had released the single, Concerto pour deux voix, which was in turn an adaptation of Concerto pour une Voix.

Since 2005 he has participated in Les Enfoirés, an ensemble of notable singers and performers in France that periodically performs charity concerts. He contributed a song named "Le Monde Qui Est Le Mien" for the album "We Love Disney 2" and also released a single, "Je Reviens".

== Filmography ==
Year	Title	Role	Director	Notes
2004	The Chorus	Pierre Morhange	Christophe Barratier	Nominated - Young Artist Award for Best Performance in an International Feature Film - Leading Young Performer
2006	Le Grand Meaulnes	François Seurel	Jean-Daniel Verhaeghe	
2006	Piccolo, Saxo et compagnie	Saxo	Eric Gutierrez & Andre Clavel	
2006	Le Cri	Young Robert	Hervé Baslé	TV mini-series
2007	Hellphone	Sid	James Huth	
2007	The Red Inn	Octave	Gérard Krawczyk	
2007	La lettre	Guy Môquet	François Hanss	Short
2011	Perfect Baby	Alex	Jing Wang	
2012	Merlin	Lancelot	Stéphane Kappes	TV mini-series
2013	I'm a Sharpener	Harris Tindall	Mahdi Lepart	Short
2014-2015	Mes chers disparus!	Alphonse	Stéphane Kappes	TV series (6 episodes)
2015	Vingt-six amis en commun	Eric	David Hammel	Short
2016	A/k	Joe	Olivier Van Hoofstadt	Short
2016	Murders in Strasbourg	Julian Mathis	Laurence Katrian	TV series (1 episode)
2017	Scènes de ménages	Léo	Francis Duquet	TV series (1 episode)
2019	Eva K.	Innkeeper	Hugo Parthonnaud	Short

== Theater ==
Year	Title	Author	Director	Notes
2013-2014	The Elephant Song	Nicolas Billon	Bruno Dupuis	Nominated - Molière Award for Best Male Newcomer
2017	On se refait Palmade !	Pierre Palmade	Pierre Palmade	
2018	Paprika	Pierre Palmade	Jeoffrey Bourdenet	
