= 2015–16 ISU Season's World Ranking =

Merit-based ice skating ranking

2015–16 ISU World Standings and Season's World Ranking
Season-end No. 1 skaters
- Men's singles: (Japan) Yuzuru Hanyu
- Ladies' singles: (Japan) Satoko Miyahara
- Pairs: (Canada) Meagan Duhamel / Eric Radford
- Ice dance: (United States) Madison Chock / Evan Bates

Season's No. 1 skaters
- Men's singles: (Japan) Yuzuru Hanyu
- Ladies' singles: (Russia) Evgenia Medvedeva
- Pairs: (Russia) Ksenia Stolbova / Fedor Klimov
- Ice dance: (United States) Madison Chock / Evan Bates

Season-end No. 1 teams
- Senior Synchronized: (Russia) Team Paradise
- Junior Synchronized: (Canada) Team Les Suprêmes Junior

Navigation

The 2015–16 ISU Season's World Ranking is based on the results of the 2015–16 season only.

== Season's World Ranking ==
The remainder of this section is a complete list, by discipline, published by the ISU.

=== Men's singles (144 skaters) ===
As of 2 April 2016

Rank	Nation	Skater	Points	Season	ISU Championships or Olympics	(Junior) Grand Prix and Final		Selected International Competition	
Rank	Nation	Skater	Points	Season	Best	Best	2nd Best	Best	2nd Best
1	JPN	Yuzuru Hanyu	2530	2015/2016 season (100%)	1080	800	400	250	0
2	ESP	Javier Fernandez	2320	2015/2016 season (100%)	1200	720	400	0	0
3	JPN	Shoma Uno	1884	2015/2016 season (100%)	638	648	400	198	0
4	CHN	Boyang Jin	1857	2015/2016 season (100%)	972	525	360	0	0
5	USA	Adam Rippon	1833	2015/2016 season (100%)	709	292	292	270	270
6	CAN	Patrick Chan	1823	2015/2016 season (100%)	840	583	400	0	0
7	USA	Max Aaron	1757	2015/2016 season (100%)	574	400	213	300	270
8	RUS	Mikhail Kolyada	1657	2015/2016 season (100%)	875	262	0	270	250
9	ISR	Daniel Samohin	1525	2015/2016 season (100%)	500	230	225	300	270
10	CZE	Michal Brezina	1371	2015/2016 season (100%)	517	213	191	225	225
11	RUS	Maxim Kovtun	1340	2015/2016 season (100%)	680	360	0	300	0
12	RUS	Dmitri Aliev	1333	2015/2016 season (100%)	295	315	250	270	203
13	RUS	Alexander Samarin	1316	2015/2016 season (100%)	365	250	182	300	219
14	CHN	Han Yan	1296	2015/2016 season (100%)	680	324	292	0	0
15	JPN	Keiji Tanaka	1253	2015/2016 season (100%)	496	262	0	270	225
16	KAZ	Denis Ten	1235	2015/2016 season (100%)	418	292	0	300	225
17	USA	Grant Hochstein	1209	2015/2016 season (100%)	465	292	292	160	0
18	LAT	Deniss Vasiljevs	1196	2015/2016 season (100%)	305	225	225	243	198
19	ISR	Alexei Bychenko	1166	2015/2016 season (100%)	756	0	0	250	160
20	ITA	Ivan Righini	1115	2015/2016 season (100%)	496	191	0	250	178
21	RUS	Alexander Petrov	1099	2015/2016 season (100%)	402	236	236	225	0
22	JPN	Takahito Mura	1078	2015/2016 season (100%)	551	324	0	203	0
23	PHI	Michael Christian Martinez	1067	2015/2016 season (100%)	362	236	0	250	219
24	RUS	Adian Pitkeev	1058	2015/2016 season (100%)	0	360	236	243	219
25	RUS	Konstantin Menshov	1048	2015/2016 season (100%)	0	262	236	300	250
26	ITA	Matteo Rizzo	1033	2015/2016 season (100%)	237	164	164	243	225
27	USA	Ross Miner	994	2015/2016 season (100%)	214	324	213	243	0
28	RUS	Sergei Voronov	944	2015/2016 season (100%)	0	262	236	243	203
29	USA	Jason Brown	894	2015/2016 season (100%)	0	324	0	300	270
30	BEL	Jorik Hendrickx	862	2015/2016 season (100%)	362	0	0	250	250
31	CAN	Nicolas Nadeau	839	2015/2016 season (100%)	450	225	164	0	0
32	FRA	Florent Amodio	831	2015/2016 season (100%)	612	0	0	219	0
33	USA	Vincent Zhou	808	2015/2016 season (100%)	328	255	225	0	0
34	JPN	Daisuke Murakami	796	2015/2016 season (100%)	0	472	324	0	0
35	MAS	Julian Zhi Jie Yee	777	2015/2016 season (100%)	192	182	133	270	0
36	USA	Tomoki Hiwatashi	772	2015/2016 season (100%)	405	203	164	0	0
37	SWE	Alexander Majorov	768	2015/2016 season (100%)	293	0	0	250	225
38	UZB	Misha Ge	766	2015/2016 season (100%)	275	191	0	300	0
39	FRA	Kevin Aymoz	760	2015/2016 season (100%)	215	182	0	203	160
40	UKR	Ivan Pavlov	713	2015/2016 season (100%)	192	203	120	198	0
41	CAN	Nam Nguyen	700	2015/2016 season (100%)	0	262	213	225	0
42	FRA	Chafik Besseghier	662	2015/2016 season (100%)	162	0	0	250	250
43	GER	Franz Streubel	658	2015/2016 season (100%)	214	0	0	225	219
44	USA	Timothy Dolensky	651	2015/2016 season (100%)	0	213	0	219	219
45	CAN	Liam Firus	647	2015/2016 season (100%)	237	0	0	250	160
46	AUS	Brendan Kerry	616	2015/2016 season (100%)	222	191	0	203	0
47	USA	Nathan Chen	600	2015/2016 season (100%)	0	350	250	0	0
48	ESP	Felipe Montoya	588	2015/2016 season (100%)	156	0	0	250	182
49	USA	Richard Dornbush	582	2015/2016 season (100%)	0	213	191	178	0
50	CHN	He Zhang	579	2015/2016 season (100%)	194	203	182	0	0
51	NOR	Sondre Oddvoll Bøe	576	2015/2016 season (100%)	74	97	97	164	144
52	RUS	Artur Dmitriev	550	2015/2016 season (100%)	0	0	0	300	250
53	CAN	Kevin Reynolds	543	2015/2016 season (100%)	293	0	0	250	0
54	JPN	Sota Yamamoto	534	2015/2016 season (100%)	0	284	250	0	0
55	SUI	Stephane Walker	511	2015/2016 season (100%)	126	0	0	203	182
56	GBR	Phillip Harris	500	2015/2016 season (100%)	140	0	0	182	178
56	UKR	Yaroslav Paniot	500	2015/2016 season (100%)	174	182	0	144	0
58	ARG	Denis Margalik	479	2015/2016 season (100%)	156	203	120	0	0
59	FIN	Roman Galay	476	2015/2016 season (100%)	0	148	0	164	164
60	RUS	Anton Shulepov	468	2015/2016 season (100%)	0	0	0	270	198
61	RUS	Gordei Gorshkov	462	2015/2016 season (100%)	0	0	0	243	219
62	CAN	Roman Sadovsky	457	2015/2016 season (100%)	0	250	207	0	0
63	ITA	Maurizio Zandron	450	2015/2016 season (100%)	0	0	0	225	225
64	RUS	Moris Kvitelashvili	441	2015/2016 season (100%)	0	0	0	243	198
65	FIN	Matthias Versluis	432	2015/2016 season (100%)	0	0	0	250	182
66	FIN	Valtter Virtanen	428	2015/2016 season (100%)	0	0	0	225	203
67	AZE	Larry Loupolover	406	2015/2016 season (100%)	0	0	0	203	203
68	SUI	Nicola Todeschini	401	2015/2016 season (100%)	55	0	0	182	164
69	ARM	Slavik Hayrapetyan	385	2015/2016 season (100%)	0	0	0	225	160
70	JPN	Ryuju Hino	381	2015/2016 season (100%)	0	0	0	203	178
71	ITA	Dario Betti	380	2015/2016 season (100%)	0	0	0	198	182
72	JPN	Daichi Miyata	379	2015/2016 season (100%)	83	148	148	0	0
73	CZE	Petr Kotlarik	369	2015/2016 season (100%)	0	108	97	164	0
74	USA	Alexei Krasnozhon	367	2015/2016 season (100%)	0	203	164	0	0
74	GBR	Charlie Parry-Evans	367	2015/2016 season (100%)	0	0	0	203	164
76	USA	Alexander Johnson	360	2015/2016 season (100%)	0	0	0	182	178
77	BLR	Pavel Ignatenko	356	2015/2016 season (100%)	0	0	0	178	178
78	POL	Krzysztof Gala	342	2015/2016 season (100%)	0	0	0	182	160
79	RUS	Petr Gumennik	330	2015/2016 season (100%)	0	182	148	0	0
80	KOR	Jin Seo Kim	325	2015/2016 season (100%)	325	0	0	0	0
81	CZE	Jiri Belohradsky	316	2015/2016 season (100%)	113	0	0	203	0
82	RUS	Daniil Bernadiner	312	2015/2016 season (100%)	0	164	148	0	0
83	AUT	Mario-Rafael Ionian	308	2015/2016 season (100%)	83	0	0	225	0
84	CAN	Elladj Balde	300	2015/2016 season (100%)	0	0	0	300	0
85	JPN	Koshiro Shimada	297	2015/2016 season (100%)	0	164	133	0	0
86	SLO	David Kranjec	295	2015/2016 season (100%)	92	0	0	203	0
87	TPE	Chih-I Tsao	284	2015/2016 season (100%)	102	0	0	182	0
88	USA	Tony Lu	281	2015/2016 season (100%)	0	148	133	0	0
89	KOR	Jun Hwan Cha	266	2015/2016 season (100%)	266	0	0	0	0
90	CHN	Nan Song	264	2015/2016 season (100%)	264	0	0	0	0
91	AUS	Andrew Dodds	257	2015/2016 season (100%)	113	0	0	144	0
92	JPN	Shu Nakamura	254	2015/2016 season (100%)	157	97	0	0	0
93	KOR	Se Jong Byun	248	2015/2016 season (100%)	140	108	0	0	0
94	RUS	Zhan Bush	243	2015/2016 season (100%)	0	0	0	243	0
95	KOR	Si Hyeong Lee	228	2015/2016 season (100%)	0	120	108	0	0
96	GBR	Peter James Hallam	225	2015/2016 season (100%)	0	0	0	225	0
97	CRO	Nicholas Vrdoljak	222	2015/2016 season (100%)	102	120	0	0	0
98	RUS	Artem Lezheev	219	2015/2016 season (100%)	0	0	0	219	0
99	GER	Niko Ulanovsky	217	2015/2016 season (100%)	0	120	97	0	0
100	BLR	Yakau Zenko	213	2015/2016 season (100%)	93	120	0	0	0
101	GER	Alexander Bjelde	203	2015/2016 season (100%)	0	0	0	203	0
101	JPN	Hiroaki Sato	203	2015/2016 season (100%)	0	0	0	203	0
101	GER	Martin Rappe	203	2015/2016 season (100%)	0	0	0	203	0
101	USA	Sean Rabbitt	203	2015/2016 season (100%)	0	0	0	203	0
105	CAN	Keegan Messing	198	2015/2016 season (100%)	0	0	0	198	0
105	GER	Peter Liebers	198	2015/2016 season (100%)	0	0	0	198	0
107	CHN	Yi Wang	191	2015/2016 season (100%)	0	191	0	0	0
108	BLR	Alexei Mialionkhin	182	2015/2016 season (100%)	0	0	0	182	0
108	CAN	Bennet Toman	182	2015/2016 season (100%)	0	0	0	182	0
108	ITA	Marco Zandron	182	2015/2016 season (100%)	0	0	0	182	0
108	CHN	Tangxu Li	182	2015/2016 season (100%)	0	182	0	0	0
108	FIN	Tomi Pulkkinen	182	2015/2016 season (100%)	0	0	0	182	0
108	SUI	Vincent Cuerel	182	2015/2016 season (100%)	0	0	0	182	0
114	KAZ	Abzal Rakimgaliev	178	2015/2016 season (100%)	0	0	0	178	0
115	KOR	June Hyoung Lee	173	2015/2016 season (100%)	173	0	0	0	0
115	GER	Paul Fentz	173	2015/2016 season (100%)	173	0	0	0	0
117	ITA	Adrien Bannister	164	2015/2016 season (100%)	0	0	0	164	0
117	ITA	Alberto Vanz	164	2015/2016 season (100%)	0	0	0	164	0
117	ITA	Alessandro Fadini	164	2015/2016 season (100%)	0	0	0	164	0
117	FIN	Juho Pirinen	164	2015/2016 season (100%)	0	0	0	164	0
117	TPE	Meng Ju Lee	164	2015/2016 season (100%)	0	0	0	164	0
117	FRA	Romain Ponsart	164	2015/2016 season (100%)	0	0	0	164	0
123	USA	Jordan Moeller	160	2015/2016 season (100%)	0	0	0	160	0
124	RUS	Vladimir Samoilov	148	2015/2016 season (100%)	0	148	0	0	0
125	KAZ	Artur Panikhin	144	2015/2016 season (100%)	0	0	0	144	0
125	CAN	Christophe Belley-Lemelin	144	2015/2016 season (100%)	0	0	0	144	0
127	ESP	Aleix Gabara	133	2015/2016 season (100%)	0	133	0	0	0
127	JPN	Hidetsugu Kamata	133	2015/2016 season (100%)	0	133	0	0	0
127	JPN	Mitsuki Sumoto	133	2015/2016 season (100%)	0	133	0	0	0
127	USA	Oleksiy Melnyk	133	2015/2016 season (100%)	0	133	0	0	0
131	RUS	Roman Savosin	127	2015/2016 season (100%)	127	0	0	0	0
132	JPN	Sena Miyake	120	2015/2016 season (100%)	0	120	0	0	0
133	JPN	Kazuki Tomono	114	2015/2016 season (100%)	114	0	0	0	0
134	RUS	Andrei Lazukin	108	2015/2016 season (100%)	0	108	0	0	0
134	USA	Kevin Shum	108	2015/2016 season (100%)	0	108	0	0	0
134	RUS	Vladislav Tarasenko	108	2015/2016 season (100%)	0	108	0	0	0
134	CHN	Yunda Lu	108	2015/2016 season (100%)	0	108	0	0	0
138	USA	Anthony Boucher	97	2015/2016 season (100%)	0	97	0	0	0
138	SWE	Illya Solomin	97	2015/2016 season (100%)	0	97	0	0	0
140	HKG	Leslie Ip	92	2015/2016 season (100%)	92	0	0	0	0
141	HKG	Harry Hau Yin Lee	83	2015/2016 season (100%)	83	0	0	0	0
142	EST	Aleksandr Selevko	75	2015/2016 season (100%)	75	0	0	0	0
143	GBR	Josh Brown	49	2015/2016 season (100%)	49	0	0	0	0
144	GEO	Irakli Maysuradze	44	2015/2016 season (100%)	44	0	0	0	0

=== Ladies' singles (152 skaters) ===
As of 3 April 2016

Rank	Nation	Skater	Points	Season	ISU Championships or Olympics	(Junior) Grand Prix and Final		Selected International Competition	
Rank	Nation	Skater	Points	Season	Best	Best	2nd Best	Best	2nd Best
1	RUS	Evgenia Medvedeva	2700	2015/2016 season (100%)	1200	800	400	300	0
2	JPN	Satoko Miyahara	2260	2015/2016 season (100%)	840	720	400	300	0
3	USA	Ashley Wagner	2063	2015/2016 season (100%)	1080	583	400	0	0
4	RUS	Anna Pogorilaya	1834	2015/2016 season (100%)	972	292	0	300	270
5	RUS	Elena Radionova	1804	2015/2016 season (100%)	756	648	400	0	0
6	USA	Gracie Gold	1800	2015/2016 season (100%)	875	525	400	0	0
7	JPN	Rika Hongo	1602	2015/2016 season (100%)	680	360	262	300	0
8	ITA	Roberta Rodeghiero	1588	2015/2016 season (100%)	551	324	213	250	250
9	USA	Mirai Nagasu	1516	2015/2016 season (100%)	756	262	0	300	198
10	JPN	Mao Asada	1510	2015/2016 season (100%)	638	472	400	0	0
11	KAZ	Elizabet Tursynbaeva	1422	2015/2016 season (100%)	377	292	213	270	270
12	LAT	Angelina Kuchvalska	1345	2015/2016 season (100%)	612	213	0	270	250
13	RUS	Maria Sotskova	1315	2015/2016 season (100%)	450	315	250	300	0
14	USA	Karen Chen	1250	2015/2016 season (100%)	264	262	262	243	219
15	CAN	Gabrielle Daleman	1234	2015/2016 season (100%)	517	262	236	219	0
16	RUS	Elizaveta Tuktamysheva	1222	2015/2016 season (100%)	0	360	262	300	300
17	JPN	Kanako Murakami	1190	2015/2016 season (100%)	446	292	292	160	0
18	RUS	Yulia Lipnitskaya	1116	2015/2016 season (100%)	0	360	236	270	250
19	JPN	Marin Honda	1034	2015/2016 season (100%)	500	284	250	0	0
20	CAN	Kaetlyn Osmond	1032	2015/2016 season (100%)	496	236	0	300	0
21	KOR	So Youn Park	1022	2015/2016 season (100%)	612	191	0	219	0
22	HUN	Ivett Tóth	1011	2015/2016 season (100%)	293	148	120	225	225
23	SVK	Nicole Rajicová	963	2015/2016 season (100%)	339	213	213	198	0
24	FIN	Viveca Lindfors	954	2015/2016 season (100%)	402	108	0	225	219
25	KOR	Da Bin Choi	952	2015/2016 season (100%)	402	203	203	144	0
26	JPN	Yuka Nagai	943	2015/2016 season (100%)	0	324	191	250	178
27	RUS	Alena Leonova	902	2015/2016 season (100%)	0	191	191	270	250
28	JPN	Yuna Shiraiwa	865	2015/2016 season (100%)	365	250	250	0	0
29	SWE	Joshi Helgesson	862	2015/2016 season (100%)	362	0	0	250	250
30	USA	Courtney Hicks	839	2015/2016 season (100%)	0	360	236	243	0
31	FRA	Laurine Lecavelier	800	2015/2016 season (100%)	325	0	0	250	225
32	JPN	Wakaba Higuchi	794	2015/2016 season (100%)	405	225	164	0	0
33	GER	Nathalie Weinzierl	788	2015/2016 season (100%)	446	0	0	178	164
34	SWE	Matilda Algotsson	784	2015/2016 season (100%)	237	133	0	250	164
35	USA	Tyler Pierce	781	2015/2016 season (100%)	295	0	0	243	243
36	RUS	Adelina Sotnikova	772	2015/2016 season (100%)	0	324	0	270	178
37	ARM	Anastasia Galustyan	768	2015/2016 season (100%)	192	108	0	243	225
38	CAN	Alaine Chartrand	748	2015/2016 season (100%)	293	236	0	219	0
39	AUS	Kailani Craine	681	2015/2016 season (100%)	237	120	0	164	160
40	TPE	Amy Lin	652	2015/2016 season (100%)	192	97	0	203	160
41	ITA	Giada Russo	642	2015/2016 season (100%)	214	0	0	225	203
42	USA	Angela Wang	637	2015/2016 season (100%)	0	191	0	243	203
43	CHN	Zijun Li	631	2015/2016 season (100%)	418	213	0	0	0
44	KOR	Na Hyun Kim	630	2015/2016 season (100%)	362	148	120	0	0
45	RUS	Serafima Sakhanovich	622	2015/2016 season (100%)	0	133	0	270	219
46	JPN	Rin Nitaya	610	2015/2016 season (100%)	0	203	182	225	0
47	RUS	Polina Tsurskaya	600	2015/2016 season (100%)	0	350	250	0	0
48	SWE	Isabelle Olsson	577	2015/2016 season (100%)	74	0	0	300	203
49	NOR	Anne Line Gjersem	543	2015/2016 season (100%)	156	0	0	243	144
50	LTU	Aleksandra Golovkina	531	2015/2016 season (100%)	173	0	0	198	160
51	USA	Polina Edmunds	528	2015/2016 season (100%)	0	292	236	0	0
52	CZE	Elizaveta Ukolova	525	2015/2016 season (100%)	0	97	0	225	203
53	AUT	Kerstin Frank	515	2015/2016 season (100%)	92	0	0	225	198
54	RUS	Maria Artemieva	513	2015/2016 season (100%)	0	0	0	270	243
55	FRA	Maé-Bérénice Méité	496	2015/2016 season (100%)	496	0	0	0	0
56	AUS	Brooklee Han	494	2015/2016 season (100%)	156	0	0	178	160
57	EST	Helery Hälvin	490	2015/2016 season (100%)	126	0	0	182	182
58	RUS	Alisa Fedichkina	480	2015/2016 season (100%)	0	255	225	0	0
59	CZE	Anna Dušková	478	2015/2016 season (100%)	0	97	0	203	178
60	GER	Lutricia Bock	475	2015/2016 season (100%)	0	0	0	250	225
61	CAN	Veronik Mallet	464	2015/2016 season (100%)	214	0	0	250	0
62	BRA	Isadora Williams	450	2015/2016 season (100%)	0	0	0	225	225
63	JPN	Mai Mihara	450	2015/2016 season (100%)	0	225	225	0	0
64	JPN	Mariko Kihara	428	2015/2016 season (100%)	0	0	0	250	178
65	HUN	Fruzsina Medgyesi	414	2015/2016 season (100%)	0	0	0	250	164
66	ITA	Ilaria Nogaro	407	2015/2016 season (100%)	0	0	0	225	182
66	EST	Johanna Allik	407	2015/2016 season (100%)	0	0	0	225	182
66	JPN	Kaori Sakamoto	407	2015/2016 season (100%)	0	225	182	0	0
69	USA	Vivian Le	406	2015/2016 season (100%)	0	203	203	0	0
70	GER	Nicole Schott	401	2015/2016 season (100%)	0	0	0	219	182
71	CZE	Michaela-Lucie Hanzlikova	399	2015/2016 season (100%)	0	120	97	182	0
72	KOR	Suh Hyun Son	391	2015/2016 season (100%)	49	0	0	182	160
73	FIN	Liubov Efimenko	389	2015/2016 season (100%)	0	0	0	225	164
74	RUS	Diana Pervushkina	385	2015/2016 season (100%)	0	203	182	0	0
74	KOR	Ji Hyun Byun	385	2015/2016 season (100%)	0	182	0	203	0
76	SLO	Dasa Grm	381	2015/2016 season (100%)	0	0	0	203	178
77	RUS	Ekaterina Mitrofanova	373	2015/2016 season (100%)	0	225	148	0	0
78	USA	Mariah Bell	369	2015/2016 season (100%)	0	191	0	178	0
79	CAN	Roxanne Rheault	367	2015/2016 season (100%)	0	0	0	203	164
80	FIN	Jenni Saarinen	364	2015/2016 season (100%)	0	0	0	182	182
80	CHN	Xiangning Li	364	2015/2016 season (100%)	68	148	148	0	0
82	UKR	Anna Khnychenkova	362	2015/2016 season (100%)	180	0	0	182	0
83	GER	Lea Johanna Dastich	360	2015/2016 season (100%)	157	0	0	203	0
84	LAT	Diana Nikitina	358	2015/2016 season (100%)	194	164	0	0	0
85	RUS	Valeriya Mikhailova	346	2015/2016 season (100%)	0	182	164	0	0
86	LUX	Fleur Maxwell	343	2015/2016 season (100%)	140	0	0	203	0
86	RSA	Michaela Du Toit	343	2015/2016 season (100%)	140	0	0	203	0
88	FIN	Juulia Turkkila	342	2015/2016 season (100%)	0	0	0	178	164
89	HKG	Maisy Hiu Ching Ma	339	2015/2016 season (100%)	114	0	0	225	0
90	CZE	Eliška Brezinová	333	2015/2016 season (100%)	83	0	0	250	0
91	KOR	So Hyun An	284	2015/2016 season (100%)	0	164	120	0	0
92	USA	Paige Rydberg	261	2015/2016 season (100%)	0	164	97	0	0
93	NOR	Camilla Gjersem	250	2015/2016 season (100%)	0	0	0	250	0
93	SWE	Linnea Mellgren	250	2015/2016 season (100%)	0	0	0	250	0
95	FIN	Anni Järvenpää	230	2015/2016 season (100%)	0	133	97	0	0
96	JPN	Haruka Imai	225	2015/2016 season (100%)	0	0	0	225	0
96	AUT	Lara Roth	225	2015/2016 season (100%)	0	0	0	225	0
98	KOR	Ha Nul Kim	215	2015/2016 season (100%)	215	0	0	0	0
99	ITA	Lucrezia Gennaro	208	2015/2016 season (100%)	75	133	0	0	0
100	ITA	Alessia Zardini	203	2015/2016 season (100%)	0	0	0	203	0
100	ITA	Carol Bressanutti	203	2015/2016 season (100%)	0	0	0	203	0
100	JPN	Miyu Nakashio	203	2015/2016 season (100%)	0	0	0	203	0
100	TUR	Sıla Saygı	203	2015/2016 season (100%)	0	0	0	203	0
100	SUI	Yasmine Kimiko Yamada	203	2015/2016 season (100%)	0	0	0	203	0
100	JPN	Yura Matsuda	203	2015/2016 season (100%)	0	203	0	0	0
106	UKR	Anastasia Gozhva	201	2015/2016 season (100%)	93	108	0	0	0
107	JPN	Riona Kato	198	2015/2016 season (100%)	0	0	0	198	0
107	CAN	Selena Zhao	198	2015/2016 season (100%)	0	0	0	198	0
109	USA	Brynne McIsaac	182	2015/2016 season (100%)	0	182	0	0	0
109	ITA	Chiara Calderone	182	2015/2016 season (100%)	0	0	0	182	0
109	FIN	Emilia Toikkanen	182	2015/2016 season (100%)	0	0	0	182	0
109	EST	Jelizaveta Leonova	182	2015/2016 season (100%)	0	0	0	182	0
109	GBR	Karly Robertson	182	2015/2016 season (100%)	0	0	0	182	0
109	USA	Maria Yang	182	2015/2016 season (100%)	0	0	0	182	0
109	DEN	Pernille Sorensen	182	2015/2016 season (100%)	0	0	0	182	0
109	GBR	Zoe Wilkinson	182	2015/2016 season (100%)	0	0	0	182	0
117	USA	Hannah Miller	178	2015/2016 season (100%)	0	0	0	178	0
118	USA	Bradie Tennell	174	2015/2016 season (100%)	174	0	0	0	0
119	CHN	Ziquan Zhao	173	2015/2016 season (100%)	173	0	0	0	0
120	AUT	Alexandra Philippova	164	2015/2016 season (100%)	0	0	0	164	0
120	USA	Amber Glenn	164	2015/2016 season (100%)	0	164	0	0	0
120	USA	Ashley Cain	164	2015/2016 season (100%)	0	0	0	164	0
120	SWE	Elin Hallberg	164	2015/2016 season (100%)	0	0	0	164	0
120	EST	Gerli Liinamäe	164	2015/2016 season (100%)	0	0	0	164	0
120	FIN	Hanna Kiviniemi	164	2015/2016 season (100%)	0	0	0	164	0
120	BUL	Hristina Vassileva	164	2015/2016 season (100%)	0	0	0	164	0
120	AUT	Natalie Klotz	164	2015/2016 season (100%)	0	0	0	164	0
120	ITA	Sara Casella	164	2015/2016 season (100%)	0	164	0	0	0
120	KOR	So Yeon Im	164	2015/2016 season (100%)	0	0	0	164	0
120	SLO	Ursa Krusec	164	2015/2016 season (100%)	0	0	0	164	0
131	ISR	Katarina Kulgeyko	160	2015/2016 season (100%)	0	0	0	160	0
132	USA	Emily Chan	148	2015/2016 season (100%)	0	148	0	0	0
132	USA	Tessa Hong	148	2015/2016 season (100%)	0	148	0	0	0
134	KAZ	Aiza Mambekova	144	2015/2016 season (100%)	0	0	0	144	0
135	CAN	Sarah Tamura	141	2015/2016 season (100%)	141	0	0	0	0
136	USA	Megan Wessenberg	133	2015/2016 season (100%)	0	133	0	0	0
136	KOR	Se Bin Park	133	2015/2016 season (100%)	0	133	0	0	0
136	JPN	Yuna Aoki	133	2015/2016 season (100%)	0	133	0	0	0
139	NED	Niki Wories	131	2015/2016 season (100%)	131	0	0	0	0
140	CHN	Lu Zheng	126	2015/2016 season (100%)	126	0	0	0	0
141	USA	Akari Nakahara	120	2015/2016 season (100%)	0	120	0	0	0
141	KOR	Yu Jin Choi	120	2015/2016 season (100%)	0	120	0	0	0
143	SWE	Anita Östlund	108	2015/2016 season (100%)	0	108	0	0	0
143	UKR	Kim Cheremsky	108	2015/2016 season (100%)	0	108	0	0	0
143	CAN	Kim Decelles	108	2015/2016 season (100%)	0	108	0	0	0
143	USA	Nina Ouellette	108	2015/2016 season (100%)	0	108	0	0	0
147	AUS	Katie Pasfield	102	2015/2016 season (100%)	102	0	0	0	0
148	KOR	Hee Soo Cho	97	2015/2016 season (100%)	0	97	0	0	0
149	THA	Thita Lamsam	92	2015/2016 season (100%)	92	0	0	0	0
150	NED	Kyarha Van Tiel	83	2015/2016 season (100%)	83	0	0	0	0
151	FRA	Alizee Crozet	61	2015/2016 season (100%)	61	0	0	0	0
152	NOR	Juni Marie Benjaminsen	55	2015/2016 season (100%)	55	0	0	0	0

=== Pairs (72 couples) ===
As of 2 April 2016

Rank	Nation	Couple	Points	Season	ISU Championships or Olympics	(Junior) Grand Prix and Final		Selected International Competition	
Rank	Nation	Couple	Points	Season	Best	Best	2nd Best	Best	2nd Best
1	RUS	Ksenia Stolbova / Fedor Klimov	2375	2015/2016 season (100%)	875	800	400	300	0
2	CAN	Meagan Duhamel / Eric Radford	2320	2015/2016 season (100%)	1200	720	400	0	0
3	USA	Alexa Scimeca / Chris Knierim	2010	2015/2016 season (100%)	756	360	324	300	270
4	RUS	Evgenia Tarasova / Vladimir Morozov	1903	2015/2016 season (100%)	787	360	213	300	243
5	CHN	Wenjing Sui / Cong Han	1840	2015/2016 season (100%)	1080	400	360	0	0
6	USA	Tarah Kayne / Danny O'Shea	1683	2015/2016 season (100%)	612	292	236	300	243
7	FRA	Vanessa James / Morgan Ciprès	1676	2015/2016 season (100%)	612	360	236	243	225
8	GER	Aliona Savchenko / Bruno Massot	1572	2015/2016 season (100%)	972	0	0	300	300
9	CHN	Xiaoyu Yu / Yang Jin	1565	2015/2016 season (100%)	680	525	360	0	0
10	RUS	Tatiana Volosozhar / Maxim Trankov	1540	2015/2016 season (100%)	840	400	0	300	0
11	USA	Marissa Castelli / Mervin Tran	1492	2015/2016 season (100%)	496	292	236	270	198
12	RUS	Kristina Astakhova / Alexei Rogonov	1461	2015/2016 season (100%)	446	262	213	270	270
13	CAN	Kirsten Moore-Towers / Michael Marinaro	1354	2015/2016 season (100%)	574	324	213	243	0
14	RUS	Yuko Kavaguti / Alexander Smirnov	1348	2015/2016 season (100%)	0	648	400	300	0
15	CAN	Lubov Iliushechkina / Dylan Moscovitch	1332	2015/2016 season (100%)	638	262	213	219	0
16	ITA	Valentina Marchei / Ondrej Hotárek	1287	2015/2016 season (100%)	551	236	0	250	250
17	ITA	Nicole Della Monica / Matteo Guarise	1271	2015/2016 season (100%)	496	262	0	270	243
18	AUT	Miriam Ziegler / Severin Kiefer	1212	2015/2016 season (100%)	362	236	191	225	198
19	GER	Mari Vartmann / Ruben Blommaert	1178	2015/2016 season (100%)	402	236	0	270	270
20	CHN	Cheng Peng / Hao Zhang	1173	2015/2016 season (100%)	377	472	324	0	0
21	CAN	Julianne Séguin / Charlie Bilodeau	1105	2015/2016 season (100%)	0	583	324	198	0
22	CZE	Anna Dušková / Martin Bidař	1040	2015/2016 season (100%)	500	315	225	0	0
23	CAN	Vanessa Grenier / Maxime Deschamps	1025	2015/2016 season (100%)	402	213	191	219	0
24	RUS	Ekaterina Borisova / Dmitry Sopot	1005	2015/2016 season (100%)	405	350	250	0	0
25	PRK	Tae Ok Ryom / Ju Sik Kim	847	2015/2016 season (100%)	446	0	0	203	198
26	UKR	Renata Oganesian / Mark Bardei	845	2015/2016 season (100%)	365	250	230	0	0
27	CHN	Xuehan Wang / Lei Wang	829	2015/2016 season (100%)	275	292	262	0	0
28	RUS	Vera Bazarova / Andrei Deputat	804	2015/2016 season (100%)	0	292	262	250	0
29	LTU	Goda Butkutė / Nikita Ermolaev	779	2015/2016 season (100%)	293	0	0	243	243
30	RUS	Natalia Zabiiako / Alexander Enbert	751	2015/2016 season (100%)	0	262	0	270	219
31	BLR	Tatiana Danilova / Mikalai Kamianchuk	742	2015/2016 season (100%)	325	0	0	219	198
32	RUS	Anastasia Gubanova / Alexei Sintsov	679	2015/2016 season (100%)	174	255	250	0	0
33	FRA	Lola Esbrat / Andrei Novoselov	653	2015/2016 season (100%)	247	0	0	203	203
34	RUS	Anastasia Mishina / Vladislav Mirzoev	614	2015/2016 season (100%)	450	164	0	0	0
35	USA	Chelsea Liu / Brian Johnson	612	2015/2016 season (100%)	328	164	120	0	0
35	JPN	Sumire Suto / Francis Boudreau Audet	612	2015/2016 season (100%)	362	0	0	250	0
37	CAN	Bryn Hoffman / Bryce Chudak	603	2015/2016 season (100%)	239	182	182	0	0
38	CAN	Justine Brasseur / Mathieu Ostiguy	578	2015/2016 season (100%)	266	164	148	0	0
39	USA	Joy Weinberg / Maximiliano Fernandez	552	2015/2016 season (100%)	194	225	133	0	0
40	RUS	Amina Atakhanova / Ilia Spiridonov	534	2015/2016 season (100%)	0	284	250	0	0
41	ITA	Bianca Manacorda / Niccolo Macii	493	2015/2016 season (100%)	295	0	0	198	0
42	USA	Lindsay Weinstein / Jacob Simon	456	2015/2016 season (100%)	215	133	108	0	0
43	GBR	Amani Fancy / Christopher Boyadji	434	2015/2016 season (100%)	0	191	0	243	0
44	RUS	Anastasia Poluianova / Stepan Korotkov	432	2015/2016 season (100%)	0	225	207	0	0
44	USA	Jessica Calalang / Zack Sidhu	432	2015/2016 season (100%)	0	213	0	219	0
46	ISR	Adel Tankova / Evgeni Krasnopolski	419	2015/2016 season (100%)	237	0	0	182	0
47	GER	Minerva Fabienne Hase / Nolan Seegert	407	2015/2016 season (100%)	0	0	0	225	182
48	FRA	Camille Mendoza / Pavel Kovalev	406	2015/2016 season (100%)	0	0	0	203	203
49	SUI	Ioulia Chtchetinina / Noah Scherer	367	2015/2016 season (100%)	0	0	0	203	164
50	SUI	Alexandra Herbrikova / Nicolas Roulet	355	2015/2016 season (100%)	173	0	0	182	0
51	RUS	Elena Ivanova / Tagir Khakimov	351	2015/2016 season (100%)	0	203	148	0	0
52	CRO	Lana Petranovic / Michael Lueck	346	2015/2016 season (100%)	0	0	0	182	164
53	GBR	Chloe Curtin / Steven Adcock	277	2015/2016 season (100%)	157	120	0	0	0
54	CHN	Ying Zhao / Zhong Xie	253	2015/2016 season (100%)	0	133	120	0	0
55	RUS	Alisa Efimova / Alexander Korovin	225	2015/2016 season (100%)	0	0	0	225	0
56	RUS	Arina Cherniavskaia / Antonino Souza-Kordyeru	219	2015/2016 season (100%)	0	0	0	219	0
57	HUN	Anna Marie Pearce / Márk Magyar	214	2015/2016 season (100%)	214	0	0	0	0
58	USA	Gretchen Donlan / Nathan Bartholomay	198	2015/2016 season (100%)	0	0	0	198	0
58	USA	Madeline Aaron / Max Settlage	198	2015/2016 season (100%)	0	0	0	198	0
60	ITA	Irma Caldara / Edoardo Caputo	194	2015/2016 season (100%)	0	97	97	0	0
61	ESP	Marcelina Lech / Aritz Maestu	192	2015/2016 season (100%)	192	0	0	0	0
62	CAN	Hayleigh Bell / Rudi Swiegers	191	2015/2016 season (100%)	0	191	0	0	0
63	USA	Jessica Pfund / Joshua Santillan	191	2015/2016 season (100%)	0	191	0	0	0
64	RUS	Alina Ustimkina / Nikita Volodin	164	2015/2016 season (100%)	0	164	0	0	0
64	JPN	Marin Ono / Wesley Killing	164	2015/2016 season (100%)	0	0	0	164	0
66	CAN	Hope McLean / Trennt Michaud	148	2015/2016 season (100%)	0	148	0	0	0
67	CHN	Yumeng Gao / Bowen Li	141	2015/2016 season (100%)	141	0	0	0	0
68	USA	Sarah Rose / Joseph Goodpaster	133	2015/2016 season (100%)	0	133	0	0	0
69	KAZ	Ekaterina Khokhlova / Abish Baytkanov	127	2015/2016 season (100%)	127	0	0	0	0
70	USA	Gabriella Marvaldi / Cody Dolkiewicz	120	2015/2016 season (100%)	0	120	0	0	0
71	GER	Minori Yuge / Jannis Bronisefski	108	2015/2016 season (100%)	0	108	0	0	0
71	CHN	Yue Han / Ziyu Kang	108	2015/2016 season (100%)	0	108	0	0	0

=== Ice dance (111 couples) ===
As of 1 April 2016

Rank	Nation	Couple	Points	Season	ISU Championships or Olympics	(Junior) Grand Prix and Final		Selected International Competition	
Rank	Nation	Couple	Points	Season	Best	Best	2nd Best	Best	2nd Best
1	USA	Madison Chock / Evan Bates	2392	2015/2016 season (100%)	972	720	400	300	0
2	USA	Maia Shibutani / Alex Shibutani	2306	2015/2016 season (100%)	1080	583	400	243	0
3	CAN	Kaitlyn Weaver / Andrew Poje	2287	2015/2016 season (100%)	787	800	400	300	0
4	ITA	Anna Cappellini / Luca Lanotte	2173	2015/2016 season (100%)	875	648	400	250	0
5	USA	Madison Hubbell / Zachary Donohue	1881	2015/2016 season (100%)	709	472	400	300	0
6	GBR	Penny Coomes / Nicholas Buckland	1712	2015/2016 season (100%)	638	292	262	270	250
7	ITA	Charlene Guignard / Marco Fabbri	1649	2015/2016 season (100%)	465	292	292	300	300
8	RUS	Ekaterina Bobrova / Dmitri Soloviev	1565	2015/2016 season (100%)	680	525	360	0	0
9	CAN	Piper Gilles / Paul Poirier	1558	2015/2016 season (100%)	574	360	324	300	0
10	DEN	Laurence Fournier Beaudry / Nikolaj Sørensen	1350	2015/2016 season (100%)	362	262	213	270	243
11	RUS	Victoria Sinitsina / Nikita Katsalapov	1296	2015/2016 season (100%)	612	360	324	0	0
12	FRA	Gabriella Papadakis / Guillaume Cizeron	1200	2015/2016 season (100%)	1200	0	0	0	0
13	SVK	Federica Testa / Lukáš Csölley	1183	2015/2016 season (100%)	402	292	0	270	219
14	RUS	Alexandra Stepanova / Ivan Bukin	1167	2015/2016 season (100%)	551	324	292	0	0
15	USA	Lorraine McNamara / Quinn Carpenter	1100	2015/2016 season (100%)	500	350	250	0	0
16	TUR	Alisa Agafonova / Alper Uçar	1027	2015/2016 season (100%)	264	213	0	300	250
17	USA	Rachel Parsons / Michael Parsons	984	2015/2016 season (100%)	450	284	250	0	0
18	RUS	Alla Loboda / Pavel Drozd	970	2015/2016 season (100%)	405	315	250	0	0
19	USA	Anastasia Cannuscio / Colin McManus	960	2015/2016 season (100%)	0	262	236	243	219
20	KOR	Rebeka Kim / Kirill Minov	957	2015/2016 season (100%)	293	236	0	250	178
21	ISR	Isabella Tobias / Ilia Tkachenko	947	2015/2016 season (100%)	377	0	0	300	270
22	CAN	Elisabeth Paradis / Francois-Xavier Ouellette	930	2015/2016 season (100%)	496	191	0	243	0
23	RUS	Elena Ilinykh / Ruslan Zhiganshin	886	2015/2016 season (100%)	0	324	262	300	0
24	JPN	Kana Muramoto / Chris Reed	884	2015/2016 season (100%)	446	213	0	225	0
25	BLR	Viktoria Kavaliova / Yurii Bieliaiev	875	2015/2016 season (100%)	173	213	0	270	219
26	UKR	Renata Oganesian / Mark Bardei	845	2015/2016 season (100%)	365	250	230	0	0
27	JPN	Emi Hirai / Marien De La Asuncion	838	2015/2016 season (100%)	264	191	0	219	164
28	POL	Natalia Kaliszek / Maksim Spodirev	813	2015/2016 season (100%)	293	0	0	270	250
29	RUS	Betina Popova / Yuri Vlasenko	800	2015/2016 season (100%)	295	255	250	0	0
30	UKR	Alexandra Nazarova / Maxim Nikitin	790	2015/2016 season (100%)	180	213	0	219	178
31	CHN	Shiyue Wang / Xinyu Liu	789	2015/2016 season (100%)	362	236	191	0	0
32	KOR	Yura Min / Alexander Gamelin	782	2015/2016 season (100%)	402	0	0	198	182
33	USA	Kaitlin Hawayek / Jean-Luc Baker	781	2015/2016 season (100%)	0	292	0	270	219
34	USA	Elliana Pogrebinsky / Alex Benoit	750	2015/2016 season (100%)	365	203	182	0	0
35	FRA	Marie-Jade Lauriault / Romain Le Gac	719	2015/2016 season (100%)	239	250	230	0	0
36	FIN	Cecilia Törn / Jussiville Partanen	693	2015/2016 season (100%)	200	0	0	250	243
37	GER	Kavita Lorenz / Panagiotis Polizoakis	691	2015/2016 season (100%)	222	0	0	250	219
38	FRA	Angelique Abachkina / Louis Thauron	673	2015/2016 season (100%)	266	225	182	0	0
39	KOR	Ho Jung Lee / Richard Kang In Kam	640	2015/2016 season (100%)	325	182	133	0	0
40	ARM	Tina Garabedian / Simon Proulx-Senecal	608	2015/2016 season (100%)	140	0	0	243	225
41	AUT	Barbora Silná / Juri Kurakin	606	2015/2016 season (100%)	162	0	0	225	219
42	CZE	Cortney Mansour / Michal Ceska	597	2015/2016 season (100%)	237	0	0	182	178
43	CAN	Mackenzie Bent / Dmitre Razgulajevs	588	2015/2016 season (100%)	215	225	148	0	0
44	KAZ	Anastasia Khromova / Daryn Zhunussov	560	2015/2016 season (100%)	214	0	0	182	164
45	USA	Danielle Thomas / Daniel Eaton	525	2015/2016 season (100%)	0	0	0	300	225
46	FRA	Lorenza Alessandrini / Pierre Souquet	520	2015/2016 season (100%)	113	0	0	225	182
47	RUS	Anastasia Shpilevaya / Grigory Smirnov	510	2015/2016 season (100%)	328	182	0	0	0
48	CAN	Alexandra Paul / Mitchell Islam	506	2015/2016 season (100%)	0	236	0	270	0
49	CAN	Melinda Meng / Andrew Meng	503	2015/2016 season (100%)	157	182	164	0	0
50	ITA	Misato Komatsubara / Andrea Fabbri	495	2015/2016 season (100%)	0	0	0	270	225
51	ITA	Sara Ghislandi / Giona Terzo Ortenzi	491	2015/2016 season (100%)	194	164	133	0	0
52	RUS	Anna Yanovskaya / Sergey Mozgov	472	2015/2016 season (100%)	0	236	236	0	0
53	FIN	Olesia Karmi / Max Lindholm	446	2015/2016 season (100%)	0	0	0	243	203
54	CZE	Nicole Kuzmich / Alexandr Sinicyn	440	2015/2016 season (100%)	174	133	133	0	0
55	RUS	Anastasia Skoptcova / Kirill Aleshin	432	2015/2016 season (100%)	0	225	207	0	0
56	USA	Christina Carreira / Anthony Ponomarenko	407	2015/2016 season (100%)	0	225	182	0	0
57	CAN	Carolane Soucisse / Simon Tanguay	406	2015/2016 season (100%)	0	0	0	203	203
57	GER	Katharina Müller / Tim Dieck	406	2015/2016 season (100%)	0	0	0	203	203
57	RUS	Sofia Shevchenko / Igor Eremenko	406	2015/2016 season (100%)	0	203	203	0	0
60	LAT	Olga Jakushina / Andrey Nevskiy	403	2015/2016 season (100%)	0	0	0	225	178
61	UKR	Valeria Gaistruk / Alexei Olejnik	385	2015/2016 season (100%)	0	0	0	203	182
62	USA	Julia Biechler / Damian Dodge	367	2015/2016 season (100%)	0	203	164	0	0
62	RUS	Sofia Evdokimova / Egor Bazin	367	2015/2016 season (100%)	0	203	164	0	0
62	RUS	Sofia Polishchuk / Alexander Vakhnov	367	2015/2016 season (100%)	0	203	164	0	0
65	FRA	Peroline Ojardias / Michael Bramante	360	2015/2016 season (100%)	0	0	0	182	178
66	UKR	Anzhelika Yurchenko / Volodymyr Byelikov	342	2015/2016 season (100%)	114	120	108	0	0
67	USA	Chloe Lewis / Logan Bye	328	2015/2016 season (100%)	0	164	164	0	0
67	FRA	Laureline Aubry / Kevin Bellingard	328	2015/2016 season (100%)	0	0	0	164	164
69	UKR	Maria Golubtsova / Kirill Belobrov	313	2015/2016 season (100%)	83	133	97	0	0
70	CHN	Xibei Li / Guangyao Xiang	300	2015/2016 season (100%)	192	108	0	0	0
71	BLR	Maria Oleynik / Yuri Hulitski	298	2015/2016 season (100%)	93	108	97	0	0
72	CAN	Payten Howland / Simon-Pierre Malette-Paque	296	2015/2016 season (100%)	0	148	148	0	0
73	ESP	Celia Robledo / Luis Fenero	290	2015/2016 season (100%)	126	0	0	164	0
74	CAN	Marjorie Lajoie / Zachary Lagha	274	2015/2016 season (100%)	141	133	0	0	0
75	RUS	Ksenia Monko / Kirill Khaliavin	262	2015/2016 season (100%)	0	262	0	0	0
75	CHN	Yue Zhao / Xun Zheng	262	2015/2016 season (100%)	0	262	0	0	0
77	CAN	Audrey Croteau-Villeneuve / Jeff Hough	256	2015/2016 season (100%)	0	148	108	0	0
78	CAN	Nicole Orford / Asher Hill	250	2015/2016 season (100%)	0	0	0	250	0
78	RUS	Tiffany Zahorski / Jonathan Guerreiro	250	2015/2016 season (100%)	0	0	0	250	0
80	RUS	Ludmila Sosnitskaia / Pavel Golovishnokov	243	2015/2016 season (100%)	0	0	0	243	0
81	FRA	Sarah Marine Rouffanche / Geoffrey Brissaud	240	2015/2016 season (100%)	0	120	120	0	0
82	CHN	Yiyi Zhang / Nan Wu	237	2015/2016 season (100%)	237	0	0	0	0
83	CAN	Andreanne Poulin / Marc-Andre Servant	225	2015/2016 season (100%)	0	0	0	225	0
84	GER	Ria Schwendinger / Valentin Wunderlich	223	2015/2016 season (100%)	103	120	0	0	0
85	BLR	Emilia Kalehanava / Uladzislau Palkhouski	217	2015/2016 season (100%)	0	120	97	0	0
86	GBR	Carter Marie Jones / Richard Sharpe	203	2015/2016 season (100%)	0	0	0	203	0
86	USA	Karina Manta / Joseph Johnson	203	2015/2016 season (100%)	0	0	0	203	0
86	NOR	Thea Rabe / Timothy Koleto	203	2015/2016 season (100%)	0	0	0	203	0
89	CAN	Lauren Collins / Shane Firus	198	2015/2016 season (100%)	0	0	0	198	0
90	USA	Charlotte Maxwell / Ryan Devereaux	182	2015/2016 season (100%)	0	0	0	182	0
90	RUS	Ksenia Konkina / Georgy Reviya	182	2015/2016 season (100%)	0	182	0	0	0
90	ITA	Victoria Manni / Saverio Giacomelli	182	2015/2016 season (100%)	0	0	0	182	0
93	CAN	Brianna Delmaestro / Timothy Lum	178	2015/2016 season (100%)	0	0	0	178	0
93	LTU	Taylor Tran / Saulius Ambrulevičius	178	2015/2016 season (100%)	0	0	0	178	0
95	AUS	Matilda Friend / William Badaoui	173	2015/2016 season (100%)	173	0	0	0	0
96	USA	Alissandra Aronow / Collin Brubaker	164	2015/2016 season (100%)	0	0	0	164	0
97	USA	Emily Day / Kevin Leahy	148	2015/2016 season (100%)	0	148	0	0	0
97	USA	Gigi Becker / Luca Becker	148	2015/2016 season (100%)	0	148	0	0	0
97	CAN	Haley Sales / Nikolas Wamsteeker	148	2015/2016 season (100%)	0	148	0	0	0
100	CAN	Hannah Whitley / Elliott Graham	133	2015/2016 season (100%)	0	133	0	0	0
101	FRA	Adelina Galayavieva / Laurent Abecassis	120	2015/2016 season (100%)	0	120	0	0	0
101	CAN	Ashlynne Stairs / Lee Royer	120	2015/2016 season (100%)	0	120	0	0	0
103	UKR	Angelina Sinkevych / Yegor Yegorov	108	2015/2016 season (100%)	0	108	0	0	0
103	LTU	Guoste Damuleviciute / Deividas Kizala	108	2015/2016 season (100%)	0	108	0	0	0
103	CAN	Valerie Taillefer / Jason Chan	108	2015/2016 season (100%)	0	108	0	0	0
106	UKR	Darya Popova / Volodymyr Nakisko	97	2015/2016 season (100%)	0	97	0	0	0
106	GBR	Ekaterina Fedyushchenko / Lucas Kitteridge	97	2015/2016 season (100%)	0	97	0	0	0
106	USA	Eliana Gropman / Ian Somerville	97	2015/2016 season (100%)	0	97	0	0	0
106	GBR	Gweneth Sletten / Elliot Verburg	97	2015/2016 season (100%)	0	97	0	0	0
110	JPN	Rikako Fukase / Aru Tateno	75	2015/2016 season (100%)	75	0	0	0	0
111	POL	Alexandra Borisova / Cezary Zawadzki	68	2015/2016 season (100%)	68	0	0	0	0

== See also ==
- 2015–16 ISU World Standings
- ISU World Standings
- ISU Season's World Ranking
- 2015–16 figure skating season
- 2015–16 synchronized skating season
