= 2015 World Junior Figure Skating Championships =

Figure skating event

- Type: ISU Championship
- Date: March 2 – 8
- Season: 2014–15
- Location: Tallinn, Estonia
- Host: Estonian Skating Union
- Venue: Tondiraba Ice Hall

Champions
- Men's singles: (Japan) Shoma Uno
- Ladies' singles: (Russia) Evgenia Medvedeva
- Pairs: (China) Yu Xiaoyu / Jin Yang
- Ice dance: (Russia) Anna Yanovskaya / Sergey Mozgov
- Previous: 2014 World Junior Championships
- Next: 2016 World Junior Championships

The 2015 World Junior Figure Skating Championships was an international figure skating competition in the 2014–15 season. The event was held on 2–8 March 2015 at the newly constructed Tondiraba Ice Hall in Tallinn, Estonia. It determined the World Junior champions in the disciplines of men's singles, ladies' singles, pair skating, and ice dance.

== Records ==
The following new junior records were set during this competition:

Event	Component	Skater(s)	Score	Date	Ref
Ladies	Short program	(Russia) Evgenia Medvedeva	68.48	4 March 2015	
Pairs	Total score	(Canada) Julianne Séguin / Charlie Bilodeau	176.32	5 March 2015	
Pairs	Total score	(China) Yu Xiaoyu / Jin Yang	178.79	5 March 2015	
Men	Short program	(Russia) Adian Pitkeev	76.94	6 March 2015	
Men	Short program	(Japan) Shoma Uno	84.87	6 March 2015	
Ice dancing	Free dance	(Russia) Anna Yanovskaya / Sergey Mozgov	93.70	7 March 2015	

== Qualification ==
The competition was open to skaters from ISU member nations who were at least 13 but not 19—or 21 for male pair skaters and ice dancers—before July 1, 2014, in their place of birth. National associations selected their entries according to their own criteria but the ISU mandated that their selections achieve a minimum technical elements score (TES) at an international event prior to the Junior Worlds.

The term "Junior" in ISU competition refers to age, not skill level. Skaters may remain age-eligible for Junior Worlds even after competing nationally and internationally at the senior level. At junior events, the ISU requires that all programs conform to junior-specific rules regarding program length, jumping passes, types of elements, etc.

=== Number of entries per discipline ===
Based on the results of the 2014 World Junior Championships, the ISU allowed each country one to three entries per discipline.

Spots	Men	Ladies	Pairs	Dance
3	Japan; Russia; United States	Japan; Russia	Canada; China; Russia	Russia; United States
2	Canada; China; Czech Republic; Latvia	Canada; South Korea; United States	Czech Republic; Italy; United States	Canada; France; South Korea; Ukraine (United Kingdom) Great Britain
If not listed above, one entry is allowed.

== Entries ==
Member nations began announcing their selections in January 2015. The ISU published the complete list of entries on 16 February 2015.

Country	Men	Ladies	Pairs	Ice dancing
Argentina	Denis Margalik			
Armenia	Slavik Hayrapetyan	Anastasia Galustyan		Tina Garabedian / Alexandre Laliberté
Australia	James Min	Kailani Craine		
Austria		Lara Roth		Christine Smith / Simon Eisenbauer
Azerbaijan	Larry Loupolover			
Belarus	Anton Karpuk	Daria Batura		Eugenia Tkachenka / Yuri Hulitski
Canada	Roman Sadovsky; Nicolas Nadeau	Selena Zhao; Kim DeGuise-Léveillée	Julianne Séguin / Charlie Bilodeau; Mary Orr / Phelan Simpson; Shalena Rau / Sébastian Arcieri	Mackenzie Bent / Garrett MacKeen; Madeline Edwards / Zhao Kai Pang
China	Jin Boyang; Zhang He	Li Xiangning	Yu Xiaoyu / Jin Yang	
Chinese Taipei	Chih-I Tsao			
Czech Republic	Jiří Bělohradský; Petr Kotlařík	Elizaveta Ukolova	Anna Dušková / Martin Bidař	Nicole Kuzmich / Alexandr Sinicyn
Denmark		Pernille Sørensen		
Estonia	Samuel Koppel	Kristina Škuleta-Gromova		Marina Elias / Denis Koreline
Finland	Roman Galay	Jenni Saarinen		
France	Simon Hocquaux	Léa Serna		Angelique Abachkina / Louis Thauron; Sarah Marine Rouffanche / Geoffrey Brissaud
Georgia	Irakli Maysuradze			
Germany	Niko Ulanovsky	Lutricia Bock		Katharina Müller / Tim Dieck
(United Kingdom) Great Britain	Graham Newberry	Danielle Harrison		Katia Fedyushchenko / Lucas Kitteridge; Robynne Tweedale / Edward Carstairs
Hong Kong		Maisy Hiu Ching Ma		
Hungary		Ivett Tóth		Carolina Moscheni / Ádám Lukács
Israel	Daniel Samohin	Netta Schreiber		Kimberly Berkovich / Ronald Zilberberg
Italy	Matteo Rizzo	Guia Maria Tagliapietra	Bianca Manacorda / Niccolò Macii	Sofia Sforza / Leo Luca Sforza
Japan	Shoma Uno; Sota Yamamoto; Hiroaki Sato	Wakaba Higuchi; Yuka Nagai; Kaori Sakamoto	Ami Koga / Francis Boudreau-Audet	
Kazakhstan		Elizabet Tursynbayeva		
Latvia	Gļebs Basins; Deniss Vasiļjevs	Diāna Ņikitina		
Lithuania		Deimantė Kizalaitė		Guostė Damulevičiūtė / Deividas Kizala
Malaysia	Julian Zhi Jie Yee			
Netherlands		Niki Wories		
Norway	Sondre Oddvoll Bøe	Juni Marie Benjaminsen		
Poland	Krzysztof Gała			Natalia Kaliszek / Maksym Spodyriev
Romania		Julia Sauter		
Russia	Alexander Petrov; Adian Pitkeev; Alexander Samarin	Evgenia Medvedeva; Serafima Sakhanovich; Maria Sotskova	Daria Beklemisheva / Maxim Bobrov; Anastasia A. Gubanova / Alexei Sintsov; Lina Fedorova / Maxim Miroshkin	Sofia Evdokimova / Egor Bazin; Betina Popova / Yuri Vlasenko; Anna Yanovskaya / Sergey Mozgov
Singapore		Shuran Yu		
Slovakia	Marco Klepoch	Nicole Rajičová		
South Africa		Michaela Du Toit		
South Korea	Kim Jin-seo	Choi Da-bin; Yoon Eun-su		Lee Ho-jung / Richard Kang-in Kam
Spain	Aleix Gabara	Mäeva Gallarda Rossell		
Sweden	Nicky Obreykov	Anita Östlund		
Switzerland	Nicola Todeschini	Matilde Gianocca		Valentina Schär / Carlo Röthlisberger
Thailand		Thita Lamsam		
Turkey		Elif Erdem		
Ukraine	Ivan Pavlov	Alina Biletska	Renata Ohanesian / Mark Bardei	Valeria Haistruk / Oleksiy Oliynyk; Oleksandra Nazarova / Maxim Nikitin
United States	Nathan Chen; Kevin Shum; Andrew Torgashev	Karen Chen; Tyler Pierce	Caitlin Fields / Ernie Utah Stevens; Chelsea Liu / Brian Johnson	Lorraine McNamara / Quinn Carpenter; Rachel Parsons / Michael Parsons; Elliana Pogrebinsky / Alex Benoit

- On 21 February 2015, Sara Ghislandi / Giona Terzo Ortenzi withdrew from the ice dancing event. Italy selected Sofia Sforza / Leo Luca Sforza to replace them.
- On 27 February 2015, 2014 World Junior bronze medalists Maria Vigalova / Egor Zakroev withdrew from the pairs event. Russia named Daria Beklemisheva / Maxim Bobrov as their replacements.
- On 2 March 2015, Sweden's Illya Solomin withdrew from the men's event and was replaced by Nicky Obreykov.

== Schedule ==
Day	Date	Start	Finish	Discipline	Event
Day 1	Wednesday 4 March	10:30	17:00	Ladies	Short program
Day 1	Wednesday 4 March	18:00	18:30		Opening ceremony
Day 1	Wednesday 4 March	18:45	20:55	Pairs	Short program
Day 2	Thursday 5 March	13:45	17:55	Dance	Short dance
Day 2	Thursday 5 March	19:00	21:25	Pairs	Free skating
Day 2	Thursday 5 March	21:25		Pairs	Victory ceremony
Day 3	Friday 6 March	10:45	16:55	Men	Short program
Day 3	Friday 6 March	18:00	21:45	Ladies	Free skating
Day 3	Friday 6 March	21:45		Ladies	Victory ceremony
Day 4	Saturday 7 March	13:30	16:40	Dance	Free dance
Day 4	Saturday 7 March	16:40		Dance	Victory ceremony
Day 4	Saturday 7 March	18:00	21:55	Men	Free skating
Day 4	Saturday 7 March	21:55		Men	Victory ceremony
Day 5	Sunday 8 March	15:00	17:00		Exhibition gala
Updated: 21 February 2015. All times are Eastern European Time (UTC+2).

== Results ==
=== Men ===
Rank	Name	Nation	Total points	SP		FS	
1	Shoma Uno	Japan	232.54	1	84.87	2	147.67
2	Jin Boyang	China	229.70	5	72.85	1	156.85
3	Sota Yamamoto	Japan	215.45	7	69.99	3	145.46
4	Nathan Chen	United States	213.85	9	69.87	4	143.98
5	Adian Pitkeev	Russia	210.71	2	76.94	7	133.77
6	Alexander Petrov	Russia	206.23	3	75.28	10	130.95
7	Deniss Vasiļjevs	Latvia	202.73	8	69.95	8	132.78
8	Daniel Samohin	Israel	202.39	12	67.00	5	135.39
9	Kim Jin-seo	South Korea	202.25	4	74.43	11	127.82
10	Andrew Torgashev	United States	201.74	10	67.78	6	133.96
11	Alexander Samarin	Russia	201.70	6	70.61	9	131.09
12	Denis Margalik	Argentina	187.26	14	62.43	12	124.83
13	Zhang He	China	186.91	11	67.49	13	119.42
14	Roman Sadovsky	Canada	177.99	13	66.36	17	111.63
15	Hiroaki Sato	Japan	176.66	17	59.94	14	116.72
16	Ivan Pavlov	Ukraine	171.02	21	55.10	15	115.92
17	Niko Ulanovsky	Germany	170.37	15	62.32	18	108.05
18	Irakli Maysuradze	Georgia	168.45	24	54.10	16	114.35
19	Julian Zhi Jie Yee	Malaysia	160.20	18	57.46	19	102.74
20	Kevin Shum	United States	158.61	16	61.61	22	97.00
21	Graham Newberry	(United Kingdom) Great Britain	154.94	23	54.56	20	100.38
22	Matteo Rizzo	Italy	154.62	20	55.61	21	99.01
23	Nicola Todeschini	Switzerland	152.56	19	56.05	23	96.51
24	Slavik Hayrapetyan	Armenia	135.06	22	54.95	24	80.11
Did not advance to free skating
25	Nicolas Nadeau	Canada		25	53.45	—N/a	
26	Sondre Oddvoll Bøe	Norway		26	53.43	—N/a	
27	Chih-I Tsao	Chinese Taipei		27	52.55	—N/a	
28	Petr Kotlařík	Czech Republic		28	51.24	—N/a	
29	Simon Hocquaux	France		29	51.19	—N/a	
30	Marco Klepoch	Slovakia		30	50.44	—N/a	
31	James Min	Australia		31	48.69	—N/a	
32	Aleix Gabara	Spain		31	46.60	—N/a	
33	Larry Loupolover	Azerbaijan		33	45.92	—N/a	
34	Nicky Obreykov	Sweden		34	45.68	—N/a	
35	Anton Karpuk	Belarus		35	45.67	—N/a	
36	Roman Galay	Finland		36	45.06	—N/a	
37	Samuel Koppel	Estonia		37	41.53	—N/a	
38	Krzysztof Gała	Poland		38	41.00	—N/a	
39	Jiří Bělohradský	Czech Republic		39	37.06	—N/a	
40	Gļebs Basins	Latvia		40	36.62	—N/a	

=== Ladies ===
Rank	Name	Nation	Total points	SP		FS	
1	Evgenia Medvedeva	Russia	192.27	1	68.48	1	124.49
2	Serafima Sakhanovich	Russia	186.15	2	63.09	3	123.06
3	Wakaba Higuchi	Japan	185.57	3	61.27	2	124.30
4	Elizabet Tursynbayeva	Kazakhstan	173.44	7	55.95	4	117.49
5	Maria Sotskova	Russia	169.04	10	53.95	5	115.09
6	Kaori Sakamoto	Japan	166.25	4	58.72	6	107.53
7	Yuka Nagai	Japan	163.93	6	56.93	7	107.00
8	Karen Chen	United States	157.30	12	51.64	8	105.66
9	Choi Da-bin	South Korea	156.38	9	54.32	9	102.06
10	Diāna Ņikitina	Latvia	148.63	13	51.22	10	97.41
11	Nicole Rajičová	Slovakia	143.77	5	57.15	13	86.62
12	Anastasia Galustyan	Armenia	140.74	11	53.10	12	87.64
13	Jenni Saarinen	Finland	139.50	8	55.43	15	84.07
14	Lutricia Bock	Germany	137.90	17	47.78	11	90.12
15	Guia Maria Tagliapietra	Italy	134.06	14	49.78	14	84.28
16	Kailani Craine	Australia	125.94	18	47.76	16	78.18
17	Elizaveta Ukolova	Czech Republic	123.44	20	46.39	17	77.05
18	Deimantė Kizalaitė	Lithuania	120.02	16	48.04	19	71.98
19	Tyler Pierce	United States	118.21	19	46.77	22	71.44
20	Léa Serna	France	118.07	21	45.35	18	72.72
21	Li Xiangning	China	116.98	24	45.06	20	71.92
22	Juni Marie Benjaminsen	Norway	116.85	22	45.30	21	71.55
23	Niki Wories	Netherlands	115.73	15	48.56	24	67.17
24	Yu Shuran	Singapore	112.61	23	45.24	23	67.37
Did not advance to free skating
25	Julia Sauter	Romania		25	45.00	—N/a	
26	Selena Zhao	Canada		26	44.22	—N/a	
27	Danielle Harrison	(United Kingdom) Great Britain		27	44.17	—N/a	
28	Ivett Tóth	Hungary		28	44.03	—N/a	
29	Kim DeGuise-Léveillée	Canada		29	43.75	—N/a	
30	Yoon Eun-su	South Korea		30	43.38	—N/a	
31	Lara Roth	Austria		31	42.20	—N/a	
32	Anita Östlund	Sweden		32	40.88	—N/a	
33	Netta Schreiber	Israel		33	40.60	—N/a	
34	Kristina Škuleta-Gromova	Estonia		34	40.54	—N/a	
35	Elif Erdem	Turkey		35	39.94	—N/a	
36	Alina Biletska	Ukraine		36	39.41	—N/a	
37	Michaela Du Toit	South Africa		37	38.69	—N/a	
38	Mäeva Gallarda Rossell	Spain		38	37.26	—N/a	
39	Pernille Sørensen	Denmark		39	36.64	—N/a	
40	Daria Batura	Belarus		40	35.90	—N/a	
41	Maisy Hiu Ching Ma	Hong Kong		41	35.48	—N/a	
42	Matilde Gianocca	Switzerland		42	34.18	—N/a	
43	Thita Lamsam	Thailand		43	29.76	—N/a	

=== Pairs ===
Rank	Name	Nation	Total points	SP		FS	
1	Yu Xiaoyu / Jin Yang	China	178.79	1	62.56	1	116.23
2	Julianne Séguin / Charlie Bilodeau	Canada	176.32	2	61.32	2	115.00
3	Lina Fedorova / Maxim Miroshkin	Russia	154.33	3	58.27	3	96.06
4	Anastasia Gubanova / Alexei Sintsov	Russia	140.39	4	50.36	5	90.03
5	Caitlin Fields / Ernie Utah Stevens	United States	138.62	7	46.84	4	91.78
6	Ami Koga / Francis Boudreau Audet	Japan	134.97	6	48.45	6	86.52
7	Chelsea Liu / Brian Johnson	United States	133.57	5	49.96	8	83.61
8	Anna Dušková / Martin Bidař	Czech Republic	128.80	9	45.51	9	83.29
9	Shalena Rau / Sébastian Arcieri	Canada	128.66	8	46.18	10	82.48
10	Mary Orr / Phelan Simpson	Canada	128.25	11	43.73	7	84.52
11	Daria Beklemisheva / Maxim Bobrov	Russia	121.98	10	44.45	12	77.53
12	Bianca Manacorda / Niccolò Macii	Italy	118.27	13	40.07	11	78.20
WD	Renata Ohanesian / Mark Bardei	Ukraine	withdrew	12	43.61	withdrew from competition	

=== Ice dancing ===
Rank	Name	Nation	Total points	SD		FD	
1	Anna Yanovskaya / Sergey Mozgov	Russia	155.92	1	62.22	1	93.70
2	Lorraine McNamara / Quinn Carpenter	United States	146.90	3	59.10	3	87.80
3	Oleksandra Nazarova / Maxim Nikitin	Ukraine	146.08	5	55.77	2	90.31
4	Rachel Parsons / Michael Parsons	United States	140.94	4	58.39	5	82.55
5	Mackenzie Bent / Garrett MacKeen	Canada	140.30	2	61.09	8	79.21
6	Madeline Edwards / Zhao Kai Pang	Canada	135.12	6	52.34	4	82.78
7	Natalia Kaliszek / Maksym Spodyriev	Poland	131.78	10	50.55	6	81.23
8	Angélique Abachkina / Louis Thauron	France	131.31	8	51.69	7	79.62
9	Carolina Moscheni / Ádám Lukács	Hungary	130.41	7	52.05	9	78.36
10	Sofia Evdokimova / Egor Bazin	Russia	126.94	11	50.44	10	76.50
11	Betina Popova / Yuri Vlasenko	Russia	125.43	9	51.17	11	74.26
12	Katharina Müller / Tim Dieck	Germany	122.48	13	48.71	12	73.77
13	Elliana Pogrebinsky / Alex Benoit	United States	120.10	12	49.37	14	70.73
14	Valeria Haistruk / Oleksiy Oliynyk	Ukraine	118.92	14	46.74	13	72.18
15	Sarah Marine Rouffanche / Geoffrey Brissaud	France	110.18	16	45.37	16	64.81
16	Tina Garabedian / Alexandre Laliberté	Armenia	109.34	18	42.57	15	66.77
17	Eugenia Tkachenka / Yuri Hulitski	Belarus	107.89	15	46.14	18	61.75
18	Sofia Sforza / Leo Luca Sforza	Italy	107.80	17	45.20	17	62.60
19	Lee Ho-jung / Richard Kang-in Kam	South Korea	101.92	20	40.49	19	61.43
20	Marina Elias / Denis Koreline	Estonia	99.79	19	41.62	20	58.17
Did not advance to free skating
21	Ekaterina Fedyushchenko / Lucas Kitteridge	(United Kingdom) Great Britain		21	39.05	—N/a	
22	Nicole Kuzmich / Alexandr Sinicyn	Czech Republic		22	38.95	—N/a	
23	Kimberly Berkovich / Ronald Zilberberg	Israel		23	37.50	—N/a	
24	Guostė Damulevičiūtė / Deividas Kizala	Lithuania		24	37.10	—N/a	
25	Christine Smith / Simon Eisenbauer	Austria		25	34.67	—N/a	
26	Robynne Tweedale / Edward Carstairs	(United Kingdom) Great Britain		26	33.89	—N/a	
27	Valentina Schär / Carlo Röthlisberger	Switzerland		27	31.13	—N/a	

== Medals summary ==
=== Medalists ===
Medals for overall placement:

Discipline	Gold	Silver	Bronze
Men	(Japan) Shoma Uno	(China) Jin Boyang	(Japan) Sota Yamamoto
Ladies	(Russia) Evgenia Medvedeva	(Russia) Serafima Sakhanovich	(Japan) Wakaba Higuchi
Pairs	(China) Yu Xiaoyu / Jin Yang	(Canada) Julianne Séguin / Charlie Bilodeau	(Russia) Lina Fedorova / Maxim Miroshkin
Ice dancing	(Russia) Anna Yanovskaya / Sergey Mozgov	(United States) Lorraine McNamara / Quinn Carpenter	(Ukraine) Oleksandra Nazarova / Maxim Nikitin

Small medals for placement in the short segment:

Discipline	Gold	Silver	Bronze
Men	(Japan) Shoma Uno	(Russia) Adian Pitkeev	(Russia) Alexander Petrov
Ladies	(Russia) Evgenia Medvedeva	(Russia) Serafima Sakhanovich	(Japan) Wakaba Higuchi
Pairs	(China) Yu Xiaoyu / Jin Yang	(Canada) Julianne Séguin / Charlie Bilodeau	(Russia) Lina Fedorova / Maxim Miroshkin
Ice dancing	(Russia) Anna Yanovskaya / Sergey Mozgov	(Canada) Mackenzie Bent / Garrett MacKeen	(United States) Lorraine McNamara / Quinn Carpenter

Small medals for placement in the free segment:

Discipline	Gold	Silver	Bronze
Men	(China) Jin Boyang	(Japan) Shoma Uno	(Japan) Sota Yamamoto
Ladies	(Russia) Evgenia Medvedeva	(Japan) Wakaba Higuchi	(Russia) Serafima Sakhanovich
Pairs	(China) Yu Xiaoyu / Jin Yang	(Canada) Julianne Séguin / Charlie Bilodeau	(Russia) Lina Fedorova / Maxim Miroshkin
Ice dancing	(Russia) Anna Yanovskaya / Sergey Mozgov	(Ukraine) Oleksandra Nazarova / Maxim Nikitin	(United States) Lorraine McNamara / Quinn Carpenter

=== By country ===
Table of medals for overall placement:

Rank	Nation	Gold	Silver	Bronze	Total
1	Russia (RUS)	2	1	1	4
2	China (CHN)	1	1	0	2
3	Japan (JPN)	1	0	2	3
4	Canada (CAN)	0	1	0	1
4	United States (USA)	0	1	0	1
6	Ukraine (UKR)	0	0	1	1
Totals (6 entries)		4	4	4	12
