= Phelan Simpson =

Canadian pair skater

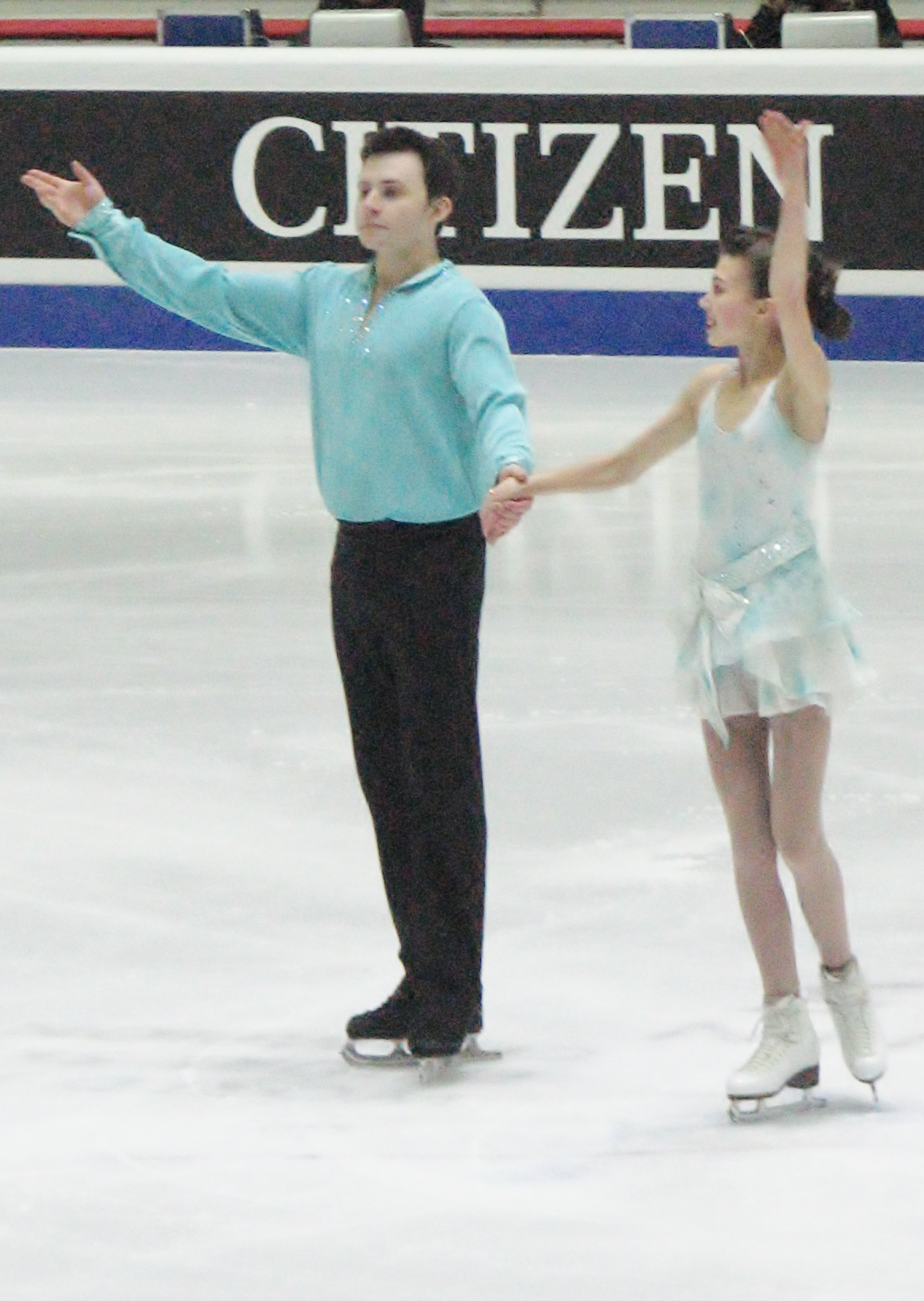
- Orr/Simpson at the 2015 World Junior Championships

Personal information
- Born: January 24, 1996 (age 30) Comox, British Columbia
- Height: 1.68 m (5 ft 6 in)

Figure skating career
- Country: Canada
- Partner: Mary Orr, Shalena Rau
- Coach: Kristy Sargeant-Wirtz, Kris Wirtz
- Skating club: Kitchener-Waterloo FSC
- Began skating: 2004
- Retired: 2015

Phelan Simpson (born January 24, 1996) is a Canadian former competitive pair skater. With Mary Orr, he finished in the top ten at the 2014 and 2015 World Junior Championships.

== Career ==
Phelan was born in Comax British Columbia to Jill Simpson and Michael Knisley after his brother, Connor. Simpson started learning to skate in 2004. He moved from Calgary, Alberta to Waterloo, Ontario after being paired with Shalena Rau in 2008. Rau/Simpson were coached by Kristy Sargeant-Wirtz and Kris Wirtz at the Kitchener-Waterloo Skating Club. They parted ways following the 2013 Canadian Championships.

Simpson teamed up with Mary Orr in 2013. The pair won the junior bronze medal at the 2014 Canadian Championships. They were assigned to the 2014 World Junior Championships in Sofia, Bulgaria, where they finished sixth.

Orr/Simpson won the national junior title at the 2015 Canadian Championships and were named in Canada's team to the 2015 World Junior Championships in Tallinn, Estonia, where they finished tenth. Simpson then retired from competitive skating to pursue other interests.

== Programs ==
=== With Mary Orr ===
Season	Short program	Free skating
2014–2015	Illumination by Secret Garden	Dueling Banjos; Farewell Cheyenne (from Once Upon a Time in the West) by Ennio Morricone; Country by Didier Riey
2013–2014	Cigarette Girl by Elliott Mayers and Telecast Orchestra; La Mer by Macklin Marrow; Cigarette Girl by Elliott Mayers and Telecast Orchestra	Dueling Banjos; Farewell Cheyenne (from Once Upon a Time in the West) by Ennio Morricone; Country by Didier Riey

=== With Shalena Rau ===
Season	Short program	Free skating
2012–2013	Chim Chim Cher-ee (from Mary Poppins) by the Sherman Brothers	My Fair Lady by Frederick Loewe

== Competitive highlights ==
JGP: Junior Grand Prix

=== With Mary Orr ===
International
Event	2013–14	2014–15
World Junior Champ.	6th	10th
JGP Croatia		7th
JGP Estonia		6th
JGP Latvia	7th	
National
Canadian Champ.	3rd J	1st J
J = Junior level

=== With Shalena Rau ===
International
Event	08–09	09–10	10–11	11–12	12–13
JGP Germany					8th
JGP United States					8th
National
Canadian Champ.	1st V	3rd N	1st N	4th J	4th J
Levels: V = Juvenile; N = Novice; J = Junior
