= Valeria Gaistruk =

Ukrainian ice dancer

Valeria Haistruk
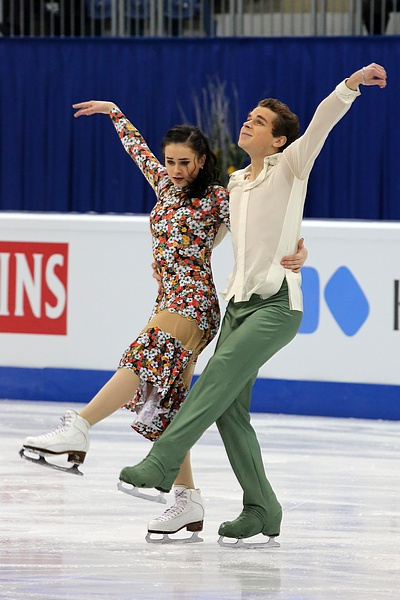

Personal information
- Native name: Валерія Гайструк
- Other names: Valeria Gaistruk
- Born: 20 July 1998 (age 28) Kyiv, Ukraine
- Height: 1.61 m (5 ft 3 1/2 in)

Figure skating career
- Country: Ukraine
- Partner: Oleksii Oliinyk
- Coach: Maria Tumanovska; Halyna Kukhar
- Skating club: Suita Kyiv
- Began skating: 2002
- Retired: 2016

Valeria Haistruk (Ukrainian: Валерія Гайструк; born 20 July 1998) is a Ukrainian former competitive ice dancer. With Oleksii Oliinyk, she won the 2016 Ukrainian national title. They placed 14th at the 2015 World Junior Championships in Tallinn, Estonia, and 26th at the 2016 European Championships in Bratislava, Slovakia. They were coached by Maria Tumanovska.

== Programs ==
(with Oliinyk)

Season	Short dance	Free dance
2015–2016	Waltz: La bohème by Charles Aznavour; Foxtrot; Waltz	Sarabande Suite by George Frideric Handel arranged by Globus
2014–2015	Samba: Mille Pasos; Samba: Samba-Reggae; Samba: Butterfly	Magic World of the Ocean (from Cirque du Soleil) by Benoît Jutras, René Dupéré
2013–2014	Quickstep: Boyfriend by Lou Bega; Foxtrot: I Can't Dance by Genesis; Quickstep: Boyfriend by Lou Bega	Magic World of the Ocean (from Cirque du Soleil) by Benoît Jutras, René Dupéré
2012–2013	Hip Hop; Blues: Ain't No Sunshine by Bill Withers	Baron Münchhausen by Roman Surzha

== Competitive highlights ==
CS: Challenger Series; JGP: Junior Grand Prix

With Oliinyk

International
Event	2012–13	2013–14	2014–15	2015–16
Europeans				26th
CS Golden Spin			11th	
CS Tallinn Trophy				9th
Cup of Nice				4th
Santa Claus Cup				3rd
Ukrainian Open		11th		
International: Junior
Junior Worlds			14th	
JGP Belarus		8th		
JGP Croatia	12th		5th	
JGP Germany			5th	
JGP Slovakia		9th		
Pavel Roman	6th			
Toruń Cup		1st	5th	
National
Ukraine		5th	3rd	1st
Ukraine, Junior			1st	
