= Sarkis Hayrapetyan =

Armenian figure skater

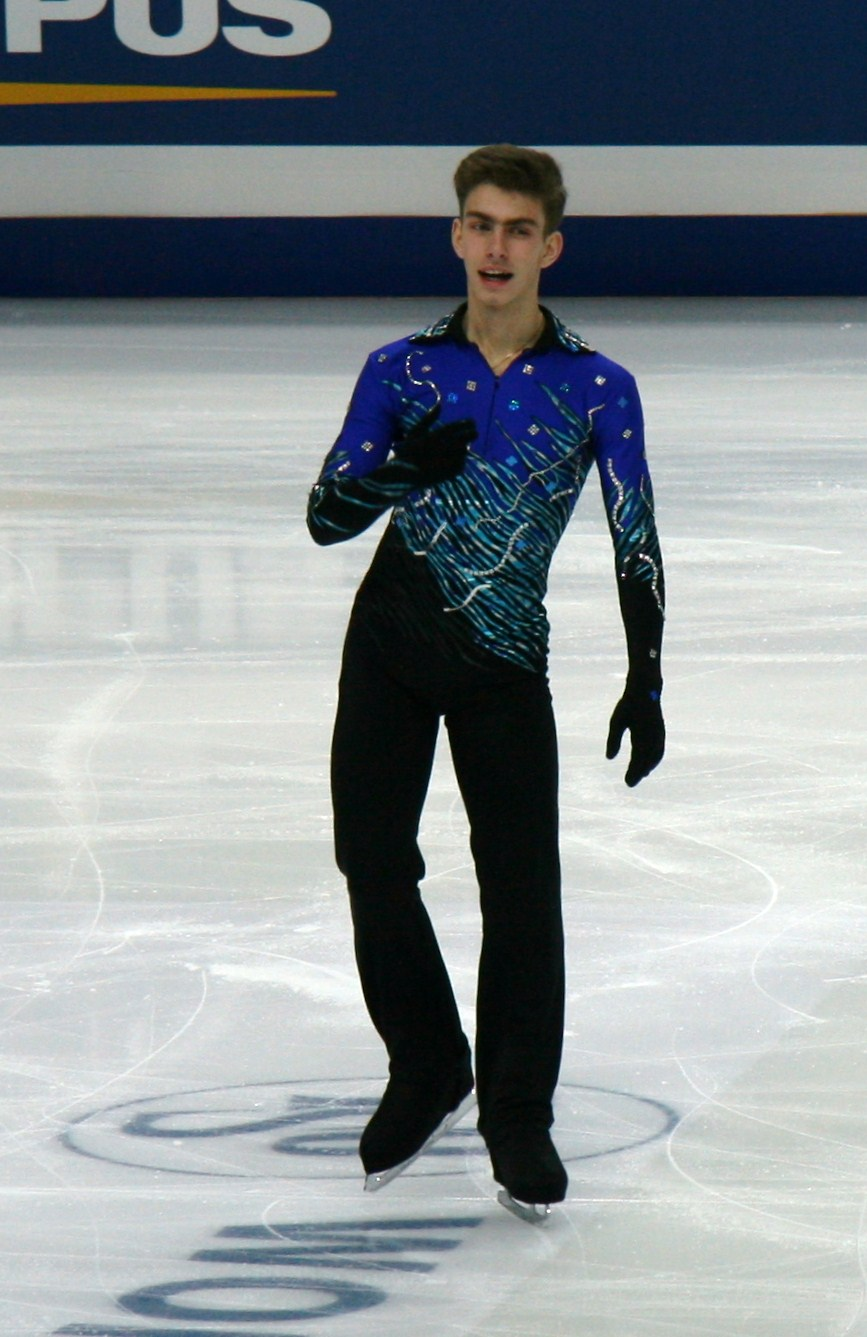
- Sarkis Hayrapetyan in 2011

Personal information
- Native name: Սարգիս Հայրապետյանը
- Born: 22 July 1992 (age 34) Yerevan, Armenia
- Height: 1.77 m (5 ft 9 1/2 in)

Figure skating career
- Country: Armenia
- Coach: Samvel Hayrapetyan
- Began skating: 2000

Sarkis Hayrapetyan (Armenian: Սարգիս Հայրապետյանը Sargis Hayrapetyany; born 22 July 1992) is an Armenian figure skater. His father, Samvel Hayrapetyan, is his coach, and his younger brother, Slavik Hayrapetyan, is also a competitive skater.

== Programs ==
Season	Short program	Free skating
2013–2014	Joda Sen	Requiem for a Dream by Clint Mansell; Matrix
2010–2012	Tchaikovski Remix by Edvin Marton	Requiem for a Dream by Clint Mansell; Matrix
2009–2010	Classical medley	Requiem for a Dream by Clint Mansell; Matrix
2007–2009	The Mask of Zorro by James Horner	Pirates of the Caribbean by Klaus Badelt

== Competitive highlights ==
JGP: Junior Grand Prix

International
Event	2004–05	2007–08	2008–09	2009–10	2010–11	2011–12	2012–13	2013–14
Worlds				42nd	23rd PR			
Europeans								35th
Bavarian Open						12th	21st	
Gardena							11th	
Ice Challenge								16th
New Year's Cup								1st
Seibt Memorial							6th	
Tallinn Trophy						1st		
Warsaw Cup								12th
International: Junior
Junior Worlds		40th	32nd					
JGP Belarus			25th					
JGP Estonia						11th		
EYOF			16th J.					
Dragon Trophy					5th J.			
Toruń Cup					2nd J.			
National
Armenian	3rd				2nd			
J. = Junior level; PR = Preliminary round
