= Mary Orr (figure skater) =

Canadian pair skater

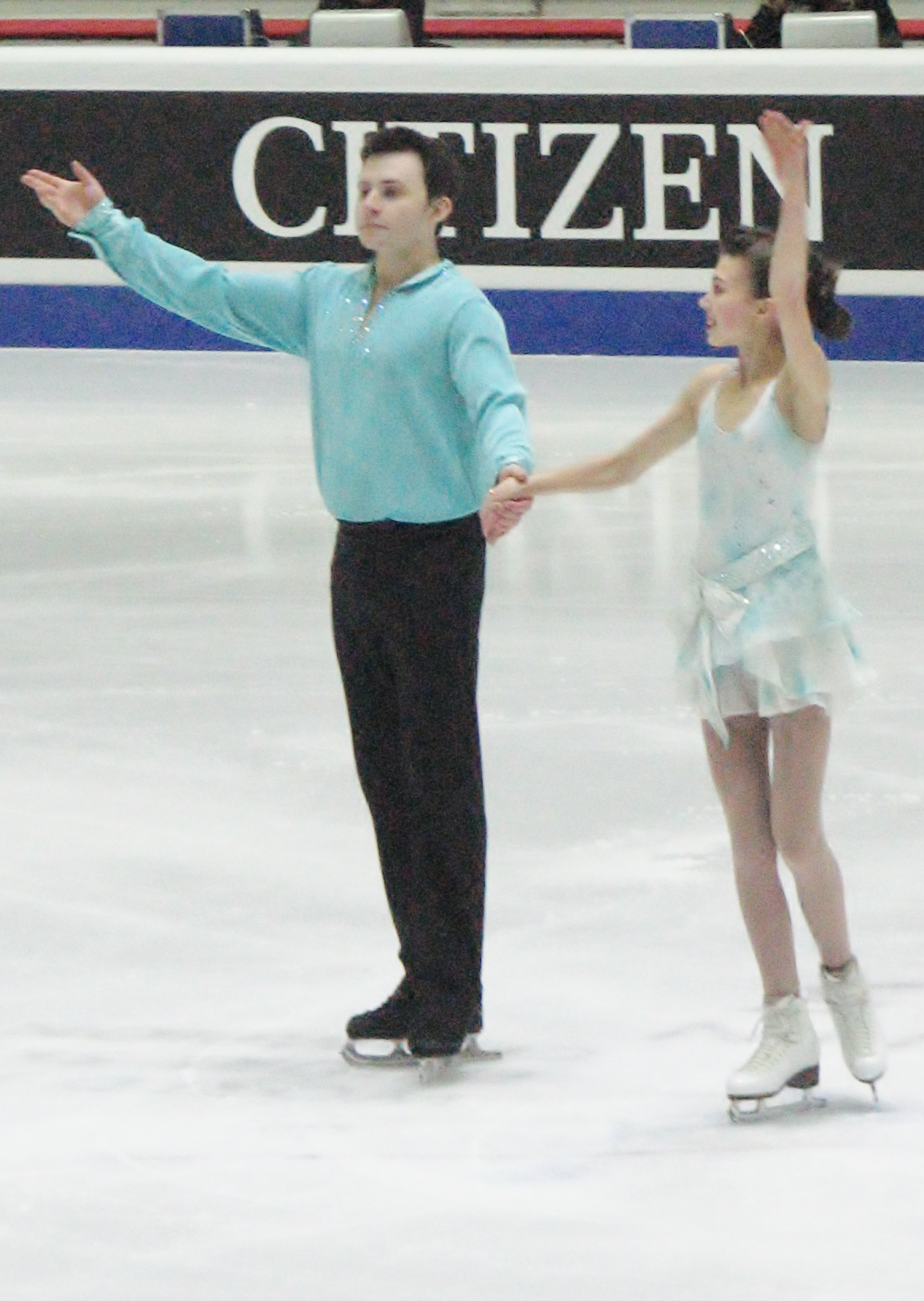
- Orr/Simpson at the 2015 World Junior Championships

Personal information
- Born: September 17, 1996 (age 29) Burlington, Ontario
- Home town: Brantford, Ontario
- Height: 1.52 m (5 ft 0 in)

Figure skating career
- Country: Canada
- Partner: Brett Varley
- Coach: Kristy Sargeant-Wirtz, Kris Wirtz
- Skating club: Kitchener-Waterloo FSC
- Began skating: 2000

Mary Orr (born September 17, 1996) is a Canadian pair skater. With former partner Phelan Simpson, she finished in the top ten at the 2014 and 2015 World Junior Championships.

== Career ==
Orr started learning to skate in 2000. She trained as a single skater at the Brantford Skating Club before moving to the Kitchener-Waterloo Skating Club, where she began skating pairs. In January 2013, she and Anthony Furiano became the Canadian junior bronze medalists for the second year in a row.

Orr teamed up with Phelan Simpson in 2013. The pair won the junior bronze medal at the 2014 Canadian Championships. They were assigned to the 2014 World Junior Championships in Sofia, Bulgaria, where they finished sixth.

Orr/Simpson won the national junior title at the 2015 Canadian Championships and were named in Canada's team to the 2015 World Junior Championships in Tallinn, Estonia, where they finished tenth. After the event, Simpson retired from competitive skating. Orr teamed up with Brett Varley in 2016.

Orr has also competed in running, mainly in 5 kilometre races.

== Programs ==
(with Simpson)

Season	Short program	Free skating
2014–2015	Illumination by Secret Garden	Dueling Banjos; Farewell Cheyenne (from Once Upon a Time in the West) by Ennio Morricone; Country by Didier Riey
2013–2014	Cigarette Girl by Elliott Mayers and Telecast Orchestra; La Mer by Macklin Marrow; Cigarette Girl by Elliott Mayers and Telecast Orchestra	Dueling Banjos; Farewell Cheyenne (from Once Upon a Time in the West) by Ennio Morricone; Country by Didier Riey

== Competitive highlights ==
JGP: Junior Grand Prix

=== With Simpson ===
International
Event	2013–14	2014–15
World Junior Champ.	6th	10th
JGP Croatia		7th
JGP Estonia		6th
JGP Latvia	7th	
National
Canadian Champ.	3rd J	1st J
J = Junior level

=== With Furiano ===
National
Event	2009–10	2010–11	2011–12	2012–13
Canadian Champ.	5th N	2nd N	3rd J	3rd J
Levels: N = Novice; J = Junior
