= Slavik Hayrapetyan =

Armenian figure skater

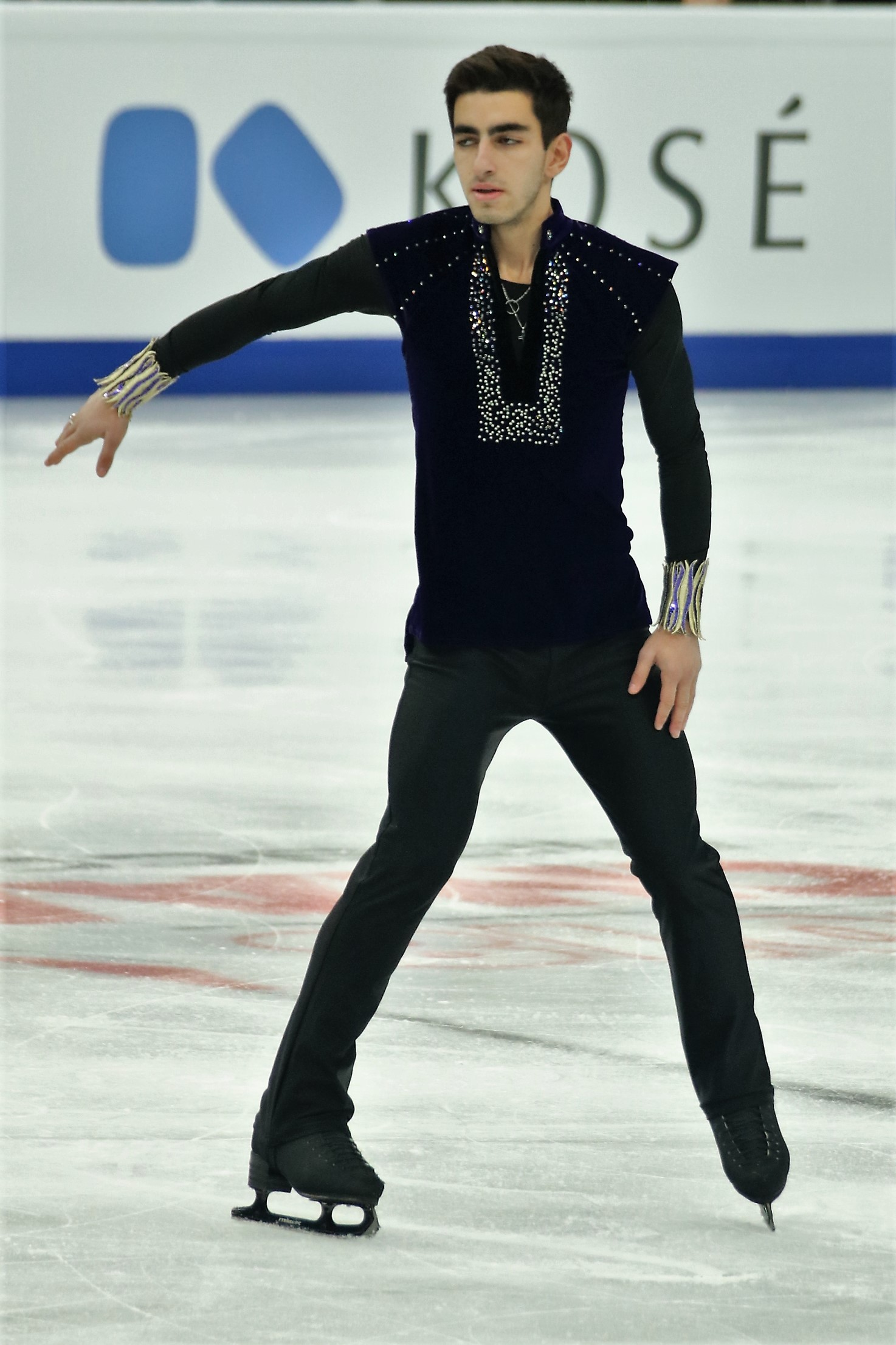
- Hayrapetyan at the 2018 European Championships

Personal information
- Native name: Սլավիկ Հայրապետյան, Славик Айрапетян
- Born: 16 March 1996 (age 30) Yerevan, Armenia
- Height: 1.72 m (5 ft 7 1/2 in)

Figure skating career
- Country: Armenia
- Coach: Samvel Hayrapetyan, Alexei Urmanov
- Skating club: Erevan CYFSC
- Began skating: 2005

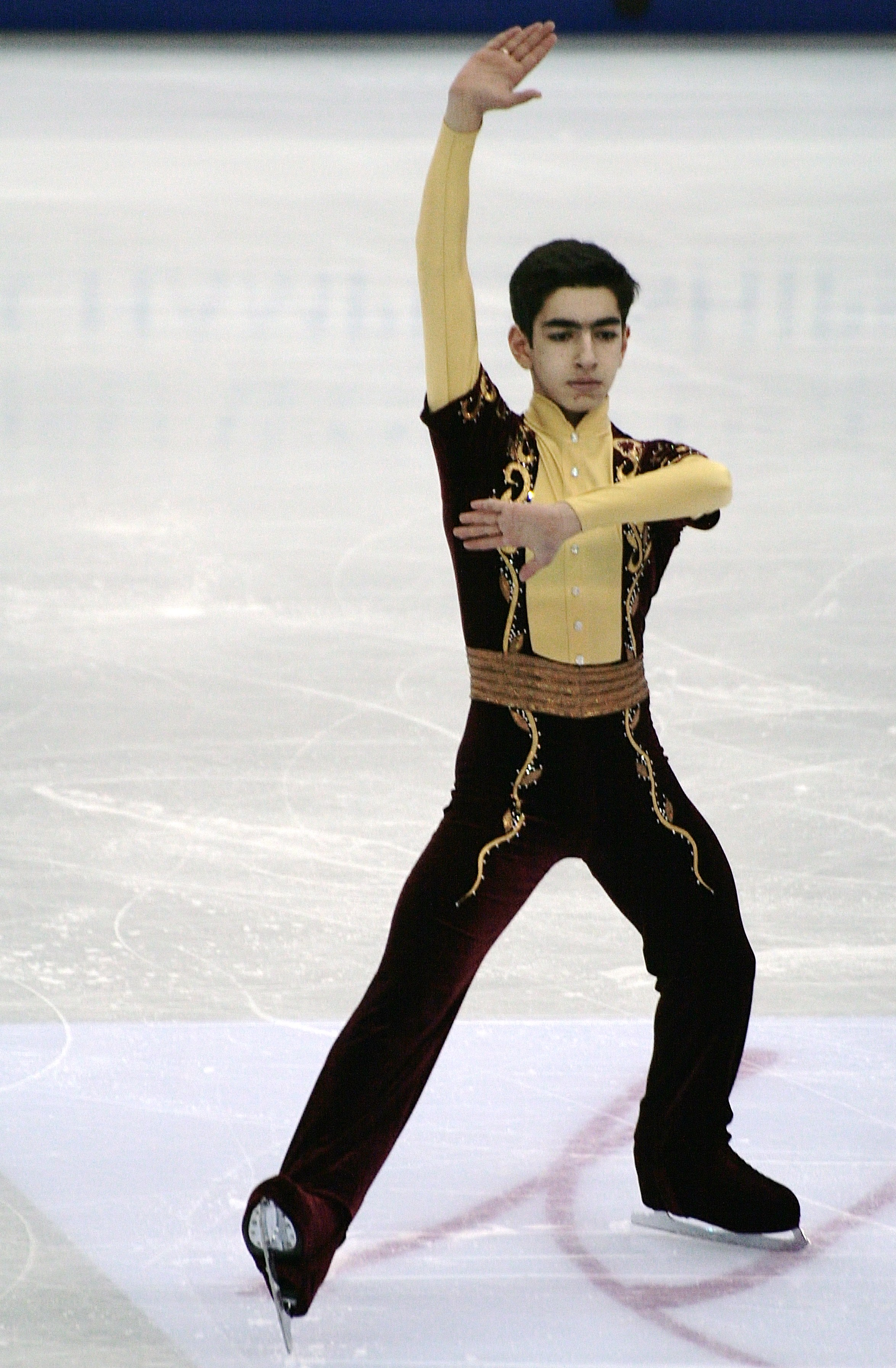
Hayrapetyan at the 2012 Worlds

Slavik Hayrapetyan (Armenian: Սլավիկ Հայրապետյան; born 16 March 1996) is an Armenian figure skater. A seven-time Armenian national champion, he has won five senior international medals and competed in the final segment at seven ISU Championships, including the 2018 World Championships, four European Championships, and two World Junior Championships.

== Personal life ==
Slavik Hayrapetyan was born on 16 March 1996 in Yerevan, Armenia. He is the son of Samvel Hayrapetyan, a figure skating coach, and the younger brother of Sarkis Hayrapetyan, a competitive skater.

== Career ==
Hayrapetyan debuted on the ISU Junior Grand Prix series in 2009. In March 2010, he was sent to The Hague, Netherlands to compete at his first World Junior Championships but was eliminated after placing 34th in the short program. He was also unsuccessful in 2011 and 2012.

Ranked 23rd in the short program, Hayrapetyan advanced to the free skate at the 2013 World Junior Championships in Milan, Italy, and finished 21st overall. He also reached the final segment at the 2015 World Junior Championships in Tallinn, Estonia, where he finished 24th, and at the 2017 European Championships in Ostrava, Czech Republic.

Hayrapetyan qualified to the free skate at the 2018 World Championships in Milan, finishing 23rd overall.

== Programs ==
Season	Short program	Free skating
2020–2021	The Dance of Peace by Tigran Grigorian choreo. by Ekaterina Proskurina	Une vie d’amour; Non je n’ai rien oublie by Charles Aznavour choreo. by Ekaterina Proskurina
2019–2020		
2018–2019	Caruso by Andrea Bocelli choreo. by Ekaterina Proskurina	God Bless Armenia by Vig Zartmen choreo. by Ekaterina Proskurina
2017–2018	Strangers in the Night by Frank Sinatra	God Bless Armenia by Vig Zartmen choreo. by Ekaterina Proskurina
2016–2017	The Godfather by Maksim Mrvica	Flamenco
2015–2016	Mouse Hunt by Alan Silvestri	Requiem for a Dream by Clint Mansell
2014–2015	Nostradamus by Maksim Mrvica	Requiem for a Dream by Clint Mansell
2013–2014	Nostradamus by Maksim Mrvica	Day of Doom by various artists
2010–2013	Jewish folk music	Armenian Both by Ara Gevorgyan
2009–2010	Charlie Chaplin medley	Tango

== Competitive highlights ==
CS: Challenger Series; JGP: Junior Grand Prix

International
Event	09–10	10–11	11–12	12–13	13–14	14–15	15–16	16–17	17–18	18–19	19–20	20–21	21–22
World Championships			36th				30th	35th	23rd	31st	C	WD	WD
Europeans Championships			28th			25th	31st	21st	15th	26th	18th		24th
CS Alpen Trophy										14th			
CS Denkova-Staviski Cup							8th						
CS Golden Spin								14th					
CS Mordovian Ornament							7th						
CS Nebelhorn Trophy									12th				11th
CS Nepela Memorial									13th				
CS Tallinn Trophy							13th	12th	8th	4th			
CS U.S. Classic										5th			
CS Warsaw Cup						15th							WD
Bavarian Open			5th	20th									
Coupe du Printemps								3rd	6th				
Egna Spring Trophy				13th									
Hellmut Seibt				8th	7th								
Ice Challenge					11th								
Ice Star					5th					3rd			
Nebelhorn Trophy					28th								
Nordics			7th										
Sarajevo Open						2nd	5th						
Sofia Trophy							1st	3rd					
Tallinn Trophy			2nd			3rd					4th		3rd
Tallink Hotels Cup											4th		
Toruń Cup							2nd	8th					
Universiade										9th			
Volvo Open Cup											10th		
Warsaw Cup					7th								
International: Junior
Junior Worlds	34th	37th	26th	21st	29th	24th							
JGP Belarus	14th												
JGP Croatia						12th							
JGP Czech Republic		17th			14th								
JGP Estonia						16th							
JGP Latvia			18th										
JGP Poland	14th				22nd								
JGP Romania			14th										
EYOF		5th											
Crystal Skate						1st							
RU Crystal Skate						4th							
Toruń Cup		3rd											
National
Armenian Champ.		1st				1st	1st	1st	1st	1st		1st	
J = Junior level; P = Preliminary round TBD = Assigned; WD = Withdrew; C = Event cancelled
