= Aleix Gabara =

Spanish figure skater (born 1999)

Aleix Gabara (born 26 August 1999 in Buenos Aires, Argentina) is a Spanish figure skater. He won the men's singles division in the 2019 Spanish Figure Skating Championships. He was the only competitor in the division.

== Competition history ==
Gabara won the junior men's division of the Spanish Figure Skating Championships in 2014, 2017, and 2018.
