= Tallinn Trophy =

International figure skating competition

- Status: Active
- Genre: ISU Challenger Series
- Frequency: Annual
- Venue: Tondiraba Ice Hall
- Location: Tallinn
- Country: Estonia
- Inaugurated: 2011
- Previous event: 2025 Tallinn Trophy
- Next event: 2026 Tallinn Trophy
- Organizer: Estonian Skating Union

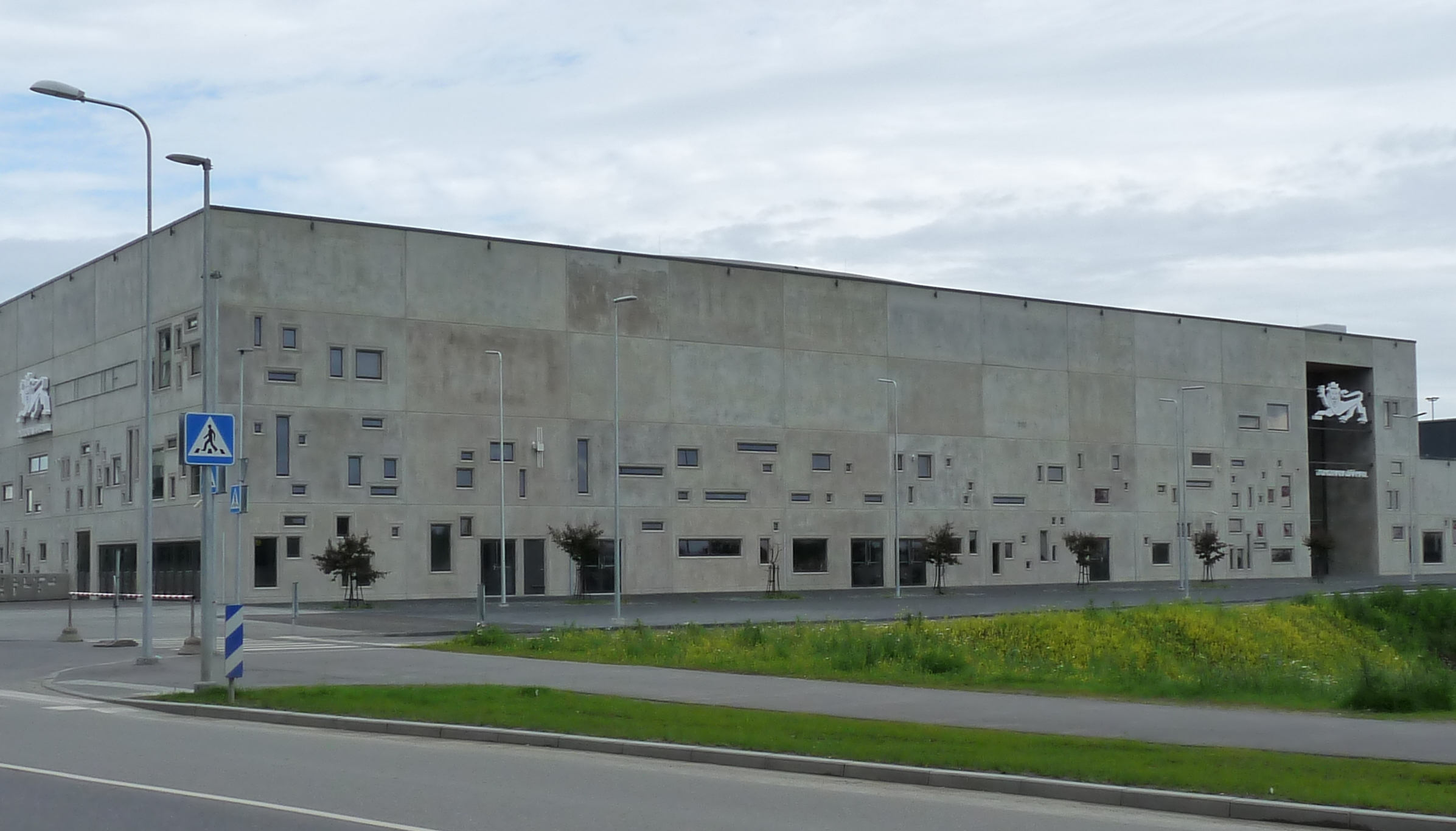
The Tondiraba Ice Hall in Tallinn has hosted the Tallinn Trophy since 2015.

The Tallinn Trophy is an annual figure skating competition sanctioned by the International Skating Union (ISU), organized and hosted by the Estonian Skating Union (Estonian: Eesti Uisuliit) at the Tondiraba Ice Hall in Tallinn, Estonia. It debuted in 2002 as a regional competition before expanding as an international event in 2011 and joining the ISU Challenger Series in 2015. Medals are awarded in men's singles, women's singles, pair skating, and ice dance at the senior and junior levels, although each discipline may not necessarily be held every year, and when the event is part of the Challenger Series, skaters earn points towards the World Standings and Season's World Ranking based on their results.

== History ==
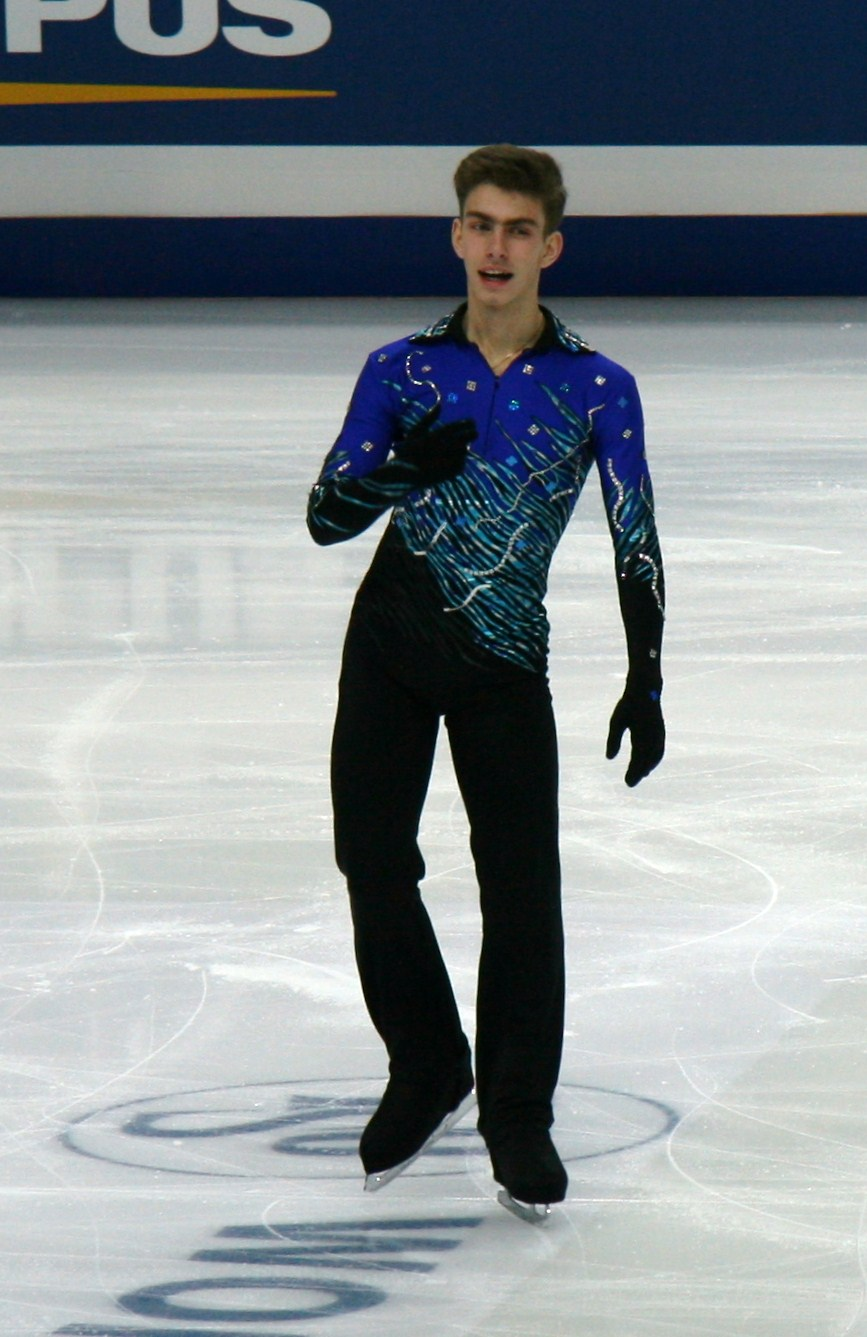
Sarkis Hayrapetyan of Armenia, the men's champion at the 2011 Tallinn Trophy

The Tallinn Trophy debuted in 2002 as a local competition. It debuted as an international skating competition in 2011; Sarkis Hayrapetyan of Armenia won the men's event, Yulia Starikova of Russia won the women's event, and Irina Štork and Taavi Rand of Estonia won the ice dance event.

The ISU Challenger Series was introduced in 2014. It is a series of international figure skating competitions sanctioned by the International Skating Union and organized by ISU member nations. The objective is to ensure consistent organization and structure within a series of international competitions linked together, providing opportunities for senior-level skaters to compete at the international level and also earn points towards the World Standings and Season's World Ranking. When an event is held as part of the Challenger Series, it must host at least three of the four disciplines (men's singles, women's singles, pair skating, and ice dance) and representatives from at least ten different ISU member nations. The minimum number of entrants required for each discipline is eight skaters each in men's singles and women's singles, five teams in pair skating, and six teams in ice dance. Each ISU member nation is eligible to enter up to three skaters or teams per discipline in each competition, although the Estonian Skating Union may enter an unlimited number of entrants in their own event.

The Tallinn Trophy was a Challenger Series event from 2015 through 2018, and again in 2024 and 2025. Due to the COVID-19 pandemic, the 2020 Tallinn Trophy was held exclusively for skaters in Estonia. It is currently hosted by the Estonian Skating Union, and It has been held at the Tondiraba Ice Hall in Tallinn since 2015.

== Senior medalists ==
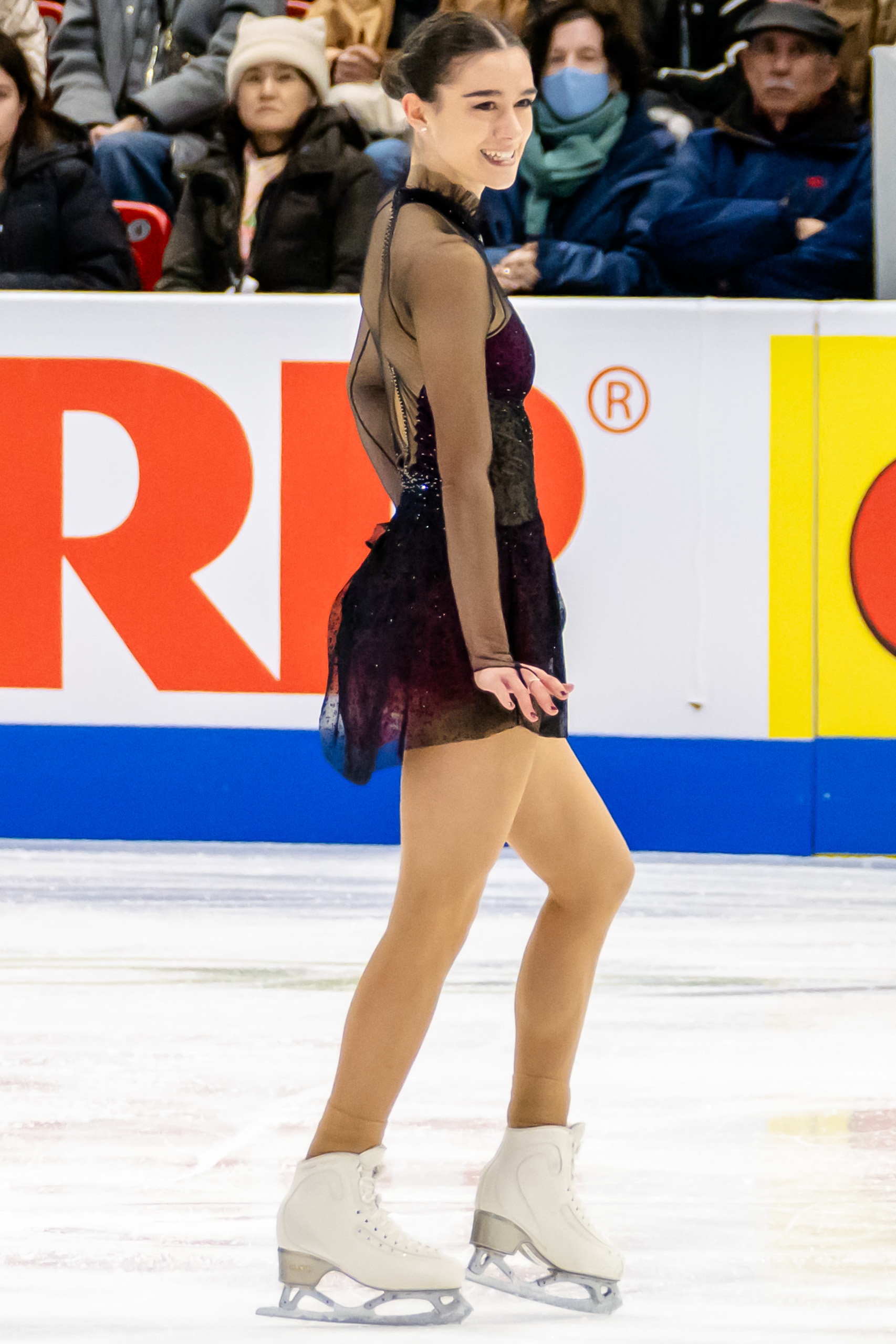
The reigning Tallinn Trophy champions (from left to right): Gabriele Frangipani of Italy (men's singles); Lara Naki Gutmann of Italy (women's singles); and Holly Harris and Jason Chan of Australia (ice dance)
Not pictured: Linzy Fitzpatrick and Keyton Bearinger of Canada (pair skating)

CS: Challenger Series event

=== Men's singles ===
Senior men's event medalists
Year	Gold	Silver	Bronze	Ref.
2011	(Armenia) Sarkis Hayrapetyan	(Armenia) Slavik Hayrapetyan	(Latvia) Girts Jekabsons	
2012	(Estonia) Viktor Romanenkov	(Estonia) Daniel Albert Naurits	(Estonia) Samuel Koppel	
2013	No men's competition			
2014	(Israel) Alexei Bychenko	(Israel) Daniel Samohin	(Armenia) Slavik Hayrapetyan	
2015 CS	(United States) Max Aaron	(Russia) Dmitri Aliev	(Latvia) Deniss Vasiļjevs	
2016 CS	(Russia) Roman Savosin	(Russia) Anton Shulepov	(United States) Andrew Torgashev	
2017 CS	(Russia) Dmitri Aliev	(United States) Alexei Krasnozhon	(Ukraine) Yaroslav Paniot	
2018 CS	(Russia) Maxim Kovtun	(United States) Vincent Zhou	(Russia) Anton Shulepov	
2019	(Estonia) Mihhail Selevko	(Estonia) Aleksandr Selevko	(Bulgaria) Nicky-Leo Obreykov	
2020	(Estonia) Aleksandr Selevko	No other competitors		
2021	(Estonia) Aleksandr Selevko	(Finland) Valtter Virtanen	(Armenia) Slavik Hayrapetyan	
2022	(France) Samy Hammi	(Ukraine) Hlib Smotrov	(Ukraine) Kyrylo Marsak	
2023	(Israel) Lev Vinokur	(Kazakhstan) Rakhat Bralin	(Ukraine) Kyrylo Marsak	
2024 CS	(United States) Jacob Sanchez	(United States) Daniel Martynov	(Canada) Roman Sadovsky	
2025 CS	(Estonia) Aleksandr Selevko	(Italy) Matteo Rizzo	(Estonia) Arlet Levandi	
2026 CS	(Italy) Gabriele Frangipani	(Canada) Anthony Paradis	(South Korea) Kim Hyun-gyeom	

=== Women's singles ===
Senior women's event medalists
Year	Gold	Silver	Bronze	Ref.
2011	(Russia) Yulia Starikova	(Estonia) Helery Hälvin	(Latvia) Stasija Rage	
2012	(Estonia) Elke Langerbaur	(Estonia) Svetlana Issakova	(Estonia) Helery Hälvin	
2013	(Estonia) Helery Hälvin	(Finland) Oona Lindhal	(Finland) Tuuli Lipiäinen	
2014	(Latvia) Angelina Kučvaļska	(Armenia) Anastasiya Galustyan	(Finland) Liubov Efimenko	
2015 CS	(Russia) Maria Sotskova	(Kazakhstan) Elizabet Tursynbaeva	(United States) Tyler Pierce	
2016 CS	(Russia) Stanislava Konstantinova	(Russia) Serafima Sakhanovich	(United States) Bradie Tennell	
2017 CS	(Russia) Stanislava Konstantinova	(Russia) Alisa Fedichkina	(Germany) Nicole Schott	
2018 CS	(Russia) Serafima Sakhanovich	(United States) Ting Cui	(Finland) Viveca Lindfors	
2019	(Russia) Ksenia Tsibinova	(Russia) Anastasiia Guliakova	(Austria) Olga Mikutina	
2020	(Estonia) Nataly Langerbaur	No other competitors		
2021	(Sweden) Josefin Taljegård	(Latvia) Angelīna Kučvaļska	(Finland) Olivia Lisko	
2022	(Sweden) Josefin Taljegård	(Latvia) Angelīna Kučvaļska	(Estonia) Kristina Škuleta-Gromova	
2023	(Italy) Sarina Joos	(Sweden) Josefin Taljegård	(Estonia) Kristina Lisovskaja	
2024 CS	(Belgium) Nina Pinzarrone	(Kazakhstan) Sofia Samodelkina	(Canada) Sara-Maude Dupuis	
2025 CS	(Finland) Olivia Lisko	(United States) Sarah Everhardt	(United States) Alina Bonillo	
2026 CS	(Italy); Lara Naki Gutmann	(Estonia); Maria Eliise Kaljuvere	(Canada); Breken Brezden	

=== Pairs ===
Senior pairs event medalists
Year	Gold	Silver	Bronze	Ref.
No senior pairs competitions prior to 2015
2015 CS	(Germany); Aljona Savchenko; Bruno Massot	(Germany); Mari Vartmann; Ruben Blommaert	(United Kingdom); Amani Fancy; Christopher Boyadji	
2016 CS	(Russia); Alina Ustimkina; Nikita Volodin	(Russia); Alisa Efimova; Aleksandr Korovin	(Lithuania); Goda Butkutė; Nikita Ermolaev	
2017 CS	(Australia); Ekaterina Alexandrovskaya; Harley Windsor	(Russia); Alisa Efimova; Aleksandr Korovin	(Russia); Anastasia Poluianova; Dmitry Sopot	
2018 CS	(Austria); Miriam Ziegler; Severin Kiefer	(United States); Tarah Kayne; Daniel O'Shea	(United States); Jessica Calalang; Brian Johnson	
2019–25	No pairs competitions			
2026 CS	(United States); Linzy Fitzpatrick; Keyton Bearinger	(Canada); Miyu Yunoki; Tristan Taylor	(United States); Reagan Moss; Jakub Galbavy	

=== Ice dance ===
Senior ice dance event medalists
Year	Gold	Silver	Bronze	Ref.
2011	(Estonia); Irina Štork; Taavi Rand	(Estonia); Hanna-Maria Tammo; Geido Kapp	No other competitors	
2012–13	No ice dance competitions			
2014	(Israel); Allison Reed; Vasili Rogov	(Georgia (country)); Tatiana Kozmava; Aleksandr Zolotarev	(Latvia); Olga Jakušina; Andrey Nevskiy	
2015 CS	(Israel); Isabella Tobias; Ilia Tkachenko	(Slovakia); Federica Testa; Lukáš Csölley	(Finland); Cecilia Törn; Jussiville Partanen	
2016 CS	(Russia); Elena Ilinykh; Ruslan Zhiganshin	(Israel); Isabella Tobias; Ilia Tkachenko	(United States); Elliana Pogrebinsky; Alex Benoit	
2017 CS	(Poland); Natalia Kaliszek; Maksym Spodyriev	(Turkey); Alisa Agafonova; Alper Uçar	(United States); Elliana Pogrebinsky; Alex Benoit	
2018 CS	(United States); Christina Carreira; Anthony Ponomarenko	(Russia); Anastasia Skoptsova; Kirill Aleshin	(Poland); Natalia Kaliszek; Maksym Spodyriev	
2019–23	No ice dance competitions			
2024 CS	(France); Evgeniia Lopareva; Geoffrey Brissaud	(United States); Emily Bratti; Ian Somerville	(Czech Republic); Kateřina Mrázková; Daniel Mrázek	
2025 CS	(Spain); Olivia Smart; Tim Dieck	(Germany); Jennifer Janse van Rensburg; Benjamin Steffan	(Czech Republic); Natálie Taschlerová; Filip Taschler	
2026 CS	(Australia); Holly Harris; Jason Chan	(Canada); Alicia Fabbri; Marko Jevgeni Gaidajenko	(United States); Amy Cui; Jonathan Rogers	

== Junior results ==
=== Men's singles ===
Junior men's event medalists
Year	Gold	Silver	Bronze	Ref.
2011	(Estonia) Samuel Koppel	(Estonia) German Frolov	No other competitors	
2012	(Russia) Daniil Parkman	(Russia) Konstantin Mavromatti	(Russia) Ilia Chernykh	
2013	(Finland) Roman Galay	(Finland) Juho Pirinen	(Russia) Ilia Chernykh	
2014	(Israel) Artem Tsoglin	(Georgia (country)) Armen Agaian	(Finland) Roman Galay	
2015	(Russia) Dmitry Bushlanov	(Russia) Igor Efimchuk	(Estonia) Daniil Zurav	
2016	(Czech Republic) Matyáš Bělohradský	(Germany) Thomas Stoll	(Russia) Nikita Starostin	
2017	(Russia) Andrei Mozalev	(Russia) Maksim Fedotov	(Czech Republic) Matyáš Bělohradský	
2018	(Russia) Artur Danielian	(Switzerland) Tomás Guarino Sabaté	(Germany) Nikita Starostin	
2019	(France) François Pitot	(France) Xan Rols	(Sweden) Oliver Praetorius	
2020	(Estonia) Arlet Levandi	(Estonia) Jegor Martshenko	No other competitors	
2021	(Sweden) Andreas Nordebäck	(Sweden) Casper Johansson	(Estonia) Jegor Martshenko	
2022	(Ukraine) Kyrylo Lishenko	(Estonia) Jegor Martshenko	(Latvia) Kirills Korkacs	
2023	(Poland) Matvii Yefymenko	(Latvia) Kirills Korkacs	(Sweden) Hugo Bostedt	
2024	(Switzerland) Ean Weiler	(Kazakhstan) Nikita Krivosheyev	(Sweden) Hugo Bostedt	
2025	(United States) Patrick Blackwell	(United States) Lorenzo Elano	(United States) Zachary Lopinto	
2026	(Estonia) Ilya Nesterov	(Switzerland) Sandro de Angelo	(Italy) Matteo Marchioni	

=== Women's singles ===
Junior women's event medalists
Year	Gold	Silver	Bronze	Ref.
2011	(Estonia) Sindra Kriisa	(Russia) Viktoria Proshina	(Latvia) Karine Rutlauka	
2012	(Russia) Stanislava Konstantinova	(Russia) Viktoria Proshina	(Russia) Ekaterina Kozlovskaya	
2013	(Norway) Jemima Rasmuss	(Russia) Ksenia Kochueva	(Estonia) Diana Reinsalu	
2014	(Finland) Anni Järvenpää	(Russia) Stanislava Konstantinova	(Estonia) Kristina Škuleta-Gromova	
2015	Group I: (Switzerland) Shaline Rügger	Group I: (Israel) Ella Mizrahi	Group I: (France) Séréna Giraud	
2015	Group II: (Russia) Stanislava Konstantinova	Group II: (Russia) Alisa Fedichkina	Group II: (Latvia) Diāna Ņikitina	
2016	(Russia) Alisa Fedichkina	(Russia) Elizaveta Nugumanova	(Czech Republic) Dahyun Ko	
2017	(Russia) Anastasiia Gubanova	(Ukraine) Anastasiia Arkhypova	(Russia) Anastasia Gracheva	
2018	(South Korea) You Young	(Finland) Selma Välitalo	(Estonia) Niina Petrõkina	
2019	(Estonia) Niina Petrokina	(Switzerland) Anais Coraducci	(Denmark) Maia Sorensen	
2020	(Estonia) Amalia Zelenjak	(Estonia) Marianne Must	(Estonia) Polina Jurtsenko	
2021	(Estonia) Amalia Zelenjak	(Latvia) Nikola Fomchenkova	(Latvia) Anastasija Konga	
2022	(Poland) Noelle Streuli	(Latvia) Nikola Fomchenkova	(Finland) Rosa Reponen	
2023	(Finland) Iida Karhunen	(Switzerland) Carla Anthea Gradinaru	(Estonia) Nataly Langerbaur	
2024	(Estonia) Maria Eliise Kaljuvere	(Switzerland) Leandra Tzimpoukakis	(United States) Josephine Lee	
2025	(Switzerland) Leandra Tzimpoukakis	(United States) Emilia Nemirovsky	(Estonia) Maria Eliise Kaljuvere	
2026	(Estonia) Sofia Nekrassova	(Cyprus) Oliviia Bazlova	(Germany) Sophie Erhardt	

=== Pairs ===
Junior pairs event medalists
Year	Gold	Silver	Bronze	Ref.
No junior pairs competitions prior to 2016
2016	(Russia); Daria Kvartalova; Alexei Sviatchenko	(Israel); Hailey Kops; Artem Tsoglin	No other competitors	
2017	(Russia); Daria Kvartalova; Alexei Sviatchenko	(France); Cléo Hamon; Denys Strekalin	No other competitors	
2018–25	No junior pairs competitions			
2026	(Georgia (country)); Zlata Kamalova; Danil Panov	(Italy); Jolena Grohne; Manuel Rossi	(Slovakia); Laura Heckova; Alex Valky	

=== Ice dance ===
Junior ice dance event medalists
Year	Gold	Silver	Bronze	Ref.
2011	(Estonia); Victoria-Laura Löhmus; Andrei Davõdov	No other competitors		
2012	(Estonia); Marina Elias; Denis Koreline	(Estonia); Ksenia Shevchenko; German Frolov	No other competitors	
2013	(Russia); Ksenia Konkina; Georgy Reviya	(Russia); Ekaterina Chernikina; Andrey Filatov	(Estonia); Marina Elias; Denis Koreline	
2014	(Belarus); Eugenia Tkachenka; Yuri Hulitski	(Israel); Kimberly Berkovich; Ronald Zilberberg	(Belarus); Emilia Kalehanova; Uladzislau Palhkhouski	
2015	(Russia); Aleksandra Amelkina; Andrey Filatov	(Russia); Ksenia Konkina; Georgy Reviya	(France); Sarah-Marine Rouffanche; Geoffrey Brissaud	
2016	(Russia); Anastasia Skoptsova; Kirill Aleshin	(Russia); Ksenia Konkina; Grigory Yakushev	(Russia); Polina Ivanenko; Daniil Karpov	
2017	(Russia); Anastasia Skoptsova; Kirill Aleshin	(Russia); Elizaveta Khudaiberdieva; Nikita Nazarov	(Russia); Julia Tultseva; Anatoliy Belovodchenko	
2018	(Russia); Elizaveta Khudaiberdieva; Nikita Nazarov	(Russia); Diana Davis; Gleb Smolkin	(Russia); Ekaterina Katashinskaya; Aleksandr Vaskovich	
2019	No junior ice dance competitions			
2020	(Estonia); Tatjana Bunina; Ivan Kuznetsov	No other competitors		
2021–23	No junior ice dance competitions			
2024	(Germany); Alexia Kruk; Jan Eisenhaber	(United Kingdom); Mimi Marler Davies; Joseph Black	(Poland); Zofia Grzegorzewska; Oleg Muratov	
2025	(Italy); Zoe Bianchi; Daniel Basile	(Switzerland); Seraina Tscharner; Laurin Wiederkehr	(Spain); Lara Sundberg; Héctor González	
2026	(Italy); Zoe Bianchi; Daniel Basile	(France); Léa Hienne; Louis Varescon	(Germany); Alexia Kruk; Jan Eisenhaber	

== Cumulative medal count (senior medalists) ==
=== Men's singles ===
Total number of Tallinn Trophy medals in men's singles by nation
Rank	Nation	Gold	Silver	Bronze	Total
1	Estonia	5	2	2	9
2	Russia	3	2	1	6
3	United States	2	3	1	6
4	Israel	2	1	0	3
5	Armenia	1	1	2	4
6	Italy	1	1	0	2
7	France	1	0	0	1
8	Ukraine	0	1	3	4
9	Canada	0	1	1	2
10	Finland	0	1	0	1
10	Kazakhstan	0	1	0	1
12	Latvia	0	0	2	2
13	Bulgaria	0	0	1	1
13	South Korea	0	0	1	1
Totals (14 entries)		15	14	14	43

=== Women's singles ===
Total number of Tallinn Trophy medals in women's singles by nation
Rank	Nation	Gold	Silver	Bronze	Total
1	Russia	6	3	0	9
2	Estonia	3	3	3	9
3	Sweden	2	1	0	3
4	Italy	2	0	0	2
5	Latvia	1	2	1	4
6	Finland	1	1	4	6
7	Belgium	1	0	0	1
8	United States	0	2	3	5
9	Kazakhstan	0	2	0	2
10	Armenia	0	1	0	1
11	Canada	0	0	2	2
12	Austria	0	0	1	1
12	Germany	0	0	1	1
Totals (13 entries)		16	15	15	46

=== Pairs ===
Total number of Tallinn Trophy medals in pairs by nation
Rank	Nation	Gold	Silver	Bronze	Total
1	Russia	1	2	1	4
2	United States	1	1	2	4
3	Germany	1	1	0	2
4	Australia	1	0	0	1
4	Austria	1	0	0	1
6	Canada	0	1	0	1
7	Great Britain	0	0	1	1
7	Lithuania	0	0	1	1
Totals (8 entries)		5	5	5	15

=== Ice dance ===
Total number of Tallinn Trophy medals in ice dance by nation
Rank	Nation	Gold	Silver	Bronze	Total
1	Israel	2	1	0	3
2	United States	1	1	3	5
3	Estonia	1	1	0	2
3	Russia	1	1	0	2
5	Poland	1	0	1	2
6	Australia	1	0	0	1
6	France	1	0	0	1
6	Spain	1	0	0	1
9	Canada	0	1	0	1
9	Georgia	0	1	0	1
9	Germany	0	1	0	1
9	Slovakia	0	1	0	1
9	Turkey	0	1	0	1
14	Czech Republic	0	0	2	2
15	Finland	0	0	1	1
15	Latvia	0	0	1	1
Totals (16 entries)		9	9	8	26

=== Total medals ===
Total number of Tallinn Trophy medals by nation
Rank	Nation	Gold	Silver	Bronze	Total
1	Russia	11	8	2	21
2	Estonia	9	6	5	20
3	United States	4	7	9	20
4	Israel	4	2	0	6
5	Italy	3	1	0	4
6	Sweden	2	1	0	3
7	Australia	2	0	0	2
7	France	2	0	0	2
9	Finland	1	2	5	8
10	Latvia	1	2	4	7
11	Armenia	1	2	2	5
12	Germany	1	2	1	4
13	Austria	1	0	1	2
14	Belgium	1	0	0	1
14	Poland	1	0	0	1
14	Spain	1	0	0	1
17	Canada	0	3	3	6
18	Kazakhstan	0	3	1	4
19	Ukraine	0	1	3	4
20	Georgia	0	1	0	1
20	Slovakia	0	1	0	1
20	Turkey	0	1	0	1
23	Czech Republic	0	0	2	2
24	Bulgaria	0	0	1	1
24	Great Britain	0	0	1	1
24	Lithuania	0	0	1	1
24	South Korea	0	0	1	1
Totals (27 entries)		45	43	42	130
