= 2014 Canadian Figure Skating Championships =

Figure skating competition

2014 Canadian Tire National Skating Championships
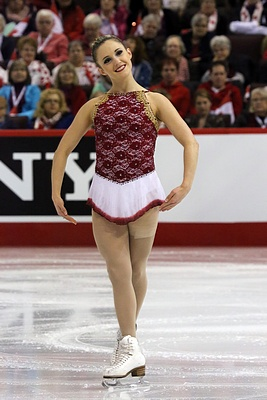
- Paige Lawrence, winner of a Bronze medal
- Type: National championship
- Date: January 9 – 15
- Season: 2013–14
- Location: Ottawa, Ontario
- Host: Skate Canada
- Venue: Canadian Tire Centre
- Previous: 2013 Canadian Championships
- Next: 2015 Canadian Championships

The 2014 Canadian Tire National Skating Championships was held from January 9 to 15, 2014 at the Canadian Tire Centre, then-named Scotiabank Place. The event determines the national champions of Canada and was organized by Skate Canada, the nation's figure skating governing body as well as sponsored by Canadian Tire. Medals were awarded in the disciplines of men's singles, women's singles, pair skating, and ice dancing on the senior, junior, and novice levels. Although the official International Skating Union terminology for female skaters in the singles category is ladies, Skate Canada uses women officially. The results of this competition are among the selection criteria for the 2014 Winter Olympics, 2014 World Championships, the 2014 Four Continents Championships, and the 2014 World Junior Championships.

In December 2012, it was announced that Ottawa, Ontario would host the 100th anniversary event.

== Senior results ==
=== Men ===
Rank	Name	Section	Total points	SP		FS	
1	Patrick Chan	CO	277.42	1	89.12	1	188.30
2	Kevin Reynolds	BC/YK	242.45	3	78.29	2	164.16
3	Liam Firus	BC/YK	238.13	2	78.93	3	159.20
4	Elladj Baldé	QC	219.89	4	75.80	5	144.09
5	Nam Nguyen	CO	218.43	7	70.97	4	147.46
6	Jeremy Ten	BC/YK	213.92	6	72.68	7	141.24
7	Andrei Rogozine	CO	213.11	5	74.60	8	138.51
8	Roman Sadovsky	CO	212.43	8	68.59	6	143.84
9	Peter O Brien	EO	195.80	10	65.50	9	130.30
10	Charles Dion	QC	195.74	9	67.75	10	127.99
11	Mitchell Gordon	BC/YK	186.57	11	65.17	11	121.40
12	Garrett Gosselin	SK	174.31	13	56.74	12	117.57
13	Shaquille Davis	CO	168.08	12	59.74	14	108.34
14	Anthony Kan	CO	165.54	15	55.63	13	109.91
15	Samuel Angers	QC	161.22	16	53.56	15	107.66
16	Mathieu Nepton	QC	159.28	17	53.18	16	106.10
17	Sasha Alcoloumbre	QC	158.00	14	56.01	18	101.99
18	Christophe Belley	QC	156.23	18	50.82	17	105.41

=== Women ===
Rank	Name	Section	Total points	SP		FS	
1	Kaetlyn Osmond	AB/NT/NU	207.24	1	70.30	1	136.94
2	Gabrielle Daleman	CO	182.47	3	58.38	2	124.09
3	Amélie Lacoste	QC	166.69	2	61.27	5	105.42
4	Veronik Mallet	QC	165.20	4	57.00	3	108.20
5	Alaine Chartrand	EO	161.46	5	53.89	4	107.57
6	Alexandra Najarro	CO	153.35	7	50.21	6	103.14
7	Julianne Séguin	QC	151.25	6	51.50	7	99.75
8	Marianne Rioux Ouellet	QC	140.06	9	47.57	8	92.49
9	Roxanne Cournoyer	QC	138.33	8	49.95	9	88.38
10	Larkyn Austman	BC/YK	133.58	10	46.58	10	87.00
11	Justine Gosselin	QC	126.18	11	46.15	11	80.03
12	Jessica Sergeant	AB/NT/NU	123.43	13	43.94	12	79.49
13	Roxanne Rheault	QC	122.46	12	45.77	14	76.69
14	Eri Nishimura	CO	121.77	14	43.42	13	78.35
15	Véronique Cloutier	NO	117.71	16	41.20	15	76.51
16	Kelsey McNeil	NB	114.26	15	42.31	16	71.95
17	Camille Ruest	QC	104.32	17	38.75	17	65.57
18	Marika Steward	NO	86.25	18	34.82	18	51.43

=== Pairs ===
Rank	Name	Section	Total points	SP		FS	
1	Meagan Duhamel / Eric Radford	QC	213.62	1	75.80	1	137.82
2	Kirsten Moore-Towers / Dylan Moscovitch	WO	209.44	2	74.96	2	134.48
3	Paige Lawrence / Rudi Swiegers	SK	176.31	3	61.67	3	114.64
4	Natasha Purich / Mervin Tran	QC	170.40	4	60.04	4	110.36
5	Margaret Purdy / Michael Marinaro	WO	147.35	5	54.23	6	93.12
6	Shalena Rau / Rob Schultz	WO	146.44	7	48.63	5	97.81
7	Brittany Jones / Joshua Reagan	WO	144.98	6	52.47	7	92.51

=== Ice dancing ===
Rank	Name	Section	Total points	SD		FD	
1	Tessa Virtue / Scott Moir	WO	194.03	1	76.16	1	117.87
2	Kaitlyn Weaver / Andrew Poje	NO	183.54	2	72.68	2	110.86
3	Alexandra Paul / Mitchell Islam	CO	170.64	3	67.67	3	102.97
4	Piper Gilles / Paul Poirier	CO	164.52	4	65.11	4	99.41
5	Nicole Orford / Thomas Williams	BC/YK	152.08	5	61.97	6	90.11
6	Kharis Ralph / Asher Hill	CO	150.30	6	60.94	7	89.36
7	Madeline Edwards / Zhao Kai Pang	BC/YK	143.90	7	55.51	8	88.39
8	Élisabeth Paradis / François-Xavier Ouellette	QC	143.80	8	52.59	5	91.21
9	Mariève Cyr / Benjamin Brisebois Gaudreau	QC	132.89	10	49.14	9	83.75
10	Victoria Hasegawa / Connor Hasegawa	QC	124.12	9	49.87	10	74.25
11	Mélissande Dumas / Simon Proulx-Sénécal	QC	116.94	11	43.95	11	72.99
12	Bianka Gadosy / Benjamin Smyth	QC	110.56	12	43.15	12	67.41
WD	Andréanne Poulin / Marc-André Servant	QC					

== Junior results ==
=== Men ===
Rank	Name	Section	Total points	SP		FS	
1	Denis Margalik	CO	181.43	2	61.84	1	119.59
2	Bennet Toman	QC	173.83	3	57.76	2	116.07
3	Eric Liu	BC/YK	171.54	4	57.57	3	113.97
4	Nicolas Nadeau	QC	165.97	1	65.60	6	100.37
5	Daniel-Olivier Boulanger-Trottier	QC	162.18	6	53.32	4	108.86
6	Hugh Brabyn-Jones	EO	156.11	12	48.44	5	107.67
7	Drew Wolfe	AB/NT/NU	154.04	5	54.98	7	99.06
8	Christopher Mostert	AB/NT/NU	140.57	11	49.28	9	91.29
9	Alexander Zahariev	CO	139.82	8	50.91	10	88.91
10	Nicolas Tondreau-Alin	QC	137.88	7	50.97	13	86.91
11	Laurent Guay	QC	135.64	10	49.32	14	86.32
12	Leslie Ip	CO	135.09	13	46.83	11	88.26
13	Mitchell Brennan	CO	134.69	16	41.45	8	93.24
14	Mathieu Ostiguy	QC	131.78	15	44.28	12	87.50
15	Antony Cheng	CO	130.24	9	50.38	17	79.86
16	Shawn Cuevas	BC/YK	126.00	14	45.83	16	80.17
17	Bryce Chudak	AB/NT/NU	121.29	17	40.96	15	80.33
18	Olivier Bergeron	QC	111.29	18	37.05	18	74.24

=== Women ===
Rank	Name	Section	Total points	SP		FS	
1	Kim DeGuise Léveillée	QC	128.17	3	43.51	1	84.66
2	Julianne Delaurier	BC/YK	120.06	2	44.22	4	75.84
3	Madelyn Dunley	CO	119.60	1	45.66	5	73.94
4	Jayda Jurome	BC/YK	117.79	11	38.86	2	78.93
5	Sandrine Martin	QC	116.37	10	38.95	3	77.42
6	Emy Decelles	QC	114.26	6	41.85	7	72.41
7	Justine Belzile	QC	113.87	7	41.03	6	72.84
8	Valerie Lavergne	QC	107.02	5	42.88	11	64.14
9	Zoe Gong	EO	106.91	9	39.98	10	66.93
10	Belvina Mao	BC/YK	106.64	4	43.32	14	63.32
11	Taylor LeClaire	AB/NT/NU	105.96	15	34.58	8	71.38
12	Kelsey Wong	BC/YK	104.15	14	34.89	9	69.26
13	Maysie Poliziani	WO	103.97	8	40.56	13	63.41
14	Alex-Anne Aubé Kubel	QC	98.28	12	36.44	16	61.84
15	Keiko Marshall	WO	96.37	16	33.69	15	62.68
16	Taylor Hunsley	WO	96.33	17	32.45	12	63.88
17	Shelby Hall	SK	90.39	18	32.36	17	58.03
18	Nicole Joe	AB/NT/NU	79.80	13	35.18	18	44.62

=== Pairs ===
Rank	Name	Section	Total points	SP		FS	
1	Vanessa Grenier / Maxime Deschamps	QC	149.51	2	50.69	1	98.82
2	Julianne Séguin / Charlie Bilodeau	QC	147.82	1	56.54	2	91.28
3	Mary Orr / Phelan Simpson	WO	121.90	6	42.28	3	79.62
4	Dylan Conway / Dustin Sherriff-Clayton	CO	120.63	3	43.77	4	76.86
5	Rachael Dobson / Alexander Sheldrick	WO	119.43	5	43.01	5	76.42
6	Taylor LeClaire / Christopher Mostert	AB/NT/NU	117.80	4	43.45	7	74.35
7	Tara Hancherow / Wesley Killing	SK	116.22	7	41.55	6	74.67
8	Julia Mercer / Samuel Morais	QC	110.52	8	37.66	8	72.86

=== Ice dancing ===
Rank	Name	Section	Total points	SD		FD	
1	Mackenzie Bent / Garrett MacKeen	EO	142.61	1	59.63	1	82.98
2	Melinda Meng / Andrew Meng	QC	134.54	2	56.89	4	77.65
3	Brianna Delmaestro / Timothy Lum	BC/YK	134.25	3	54.60	3	79.65
4	Danielle Wu / Spencer Soo	BC/YK	128.44	4	53.55	5	74.89
5	Carolane Soucisse / Simon Tanguay	QC	126.95	7	46.52	2	80.43
6	Lauren Collins / Danny Seymour	CO	119.93	9	45.78	6	74.15
7	Audrey Croteau-Villeneuve / Dominic Barthe	QC	111.30	8	46.27	9	65.03
8	Samantha Glavine / Jeff Hough	EO	110.84	10	44.61	8	66.23
9	Tina Garabedian / Alexandre Laliberté	QC	108.63	6	48.24	11	60.39
10	Laura-Maude Verret / Simon Desrochers	QC	108.41	5	48.75	12	59.66
11	Katie Desveaux / Dmitre Razgulajevs	CO	107.42	13	40.90	7	66.52
12	Courtney Royer / Addison Voldeng	SK	105.27	12	41.71	10	63.56
13	Caroline Falardeau / Benjamin Mulder	QC	101.79	11	43.67	13	58.12
14	Alexa Linden / Eric Streichsbier	BC/YK	96.14	14	39.04	14	57.10
15	Catherine Daigle-Roy / Alexis St-Louis	QC	93.91	15	37.60	15	56.31

== Novice results ==
=== Men ===
Rank	Name	Section	Total points	SP		FS	
1	Joseph Phan	QC	119.84	1	42.40	2	77.44
2	Edrian Paul Celestino	QC	115.60	7	34.27	1	81.33
3	Josh Allen	EO	107.36	2	37.11	5	70.25
4	Alexander Lawrence	BC/YK	105.63	5	34.98	4	70.65
5	Zachary Daleman	CO	105.29	3	37.09	6	68.20
6	William Turcotte Miao	QC	104.66	9	33.26	3	71.40
7	Grayson Rosen	AB/NT/NU	102.33	4	35.64	8	66.69
8	Andriyko Goyaniuk	EO	102.23	6	34.79	7	67.44
9	Liam Mahood	CO	98.91	10	32.83	9	66.08
10	Zoé Duval-Yergeau	QC	91.75	12	32.35	10	59.40
11	Christian Reekie	EO	91.51	8	33.72	12	57.79
12	William Langlois	QC	88.64	15	29.71	11	58.93
13	Kelly Batisty	BC/YK	88.43	14	30.80	13	57.63
14	Kurtis Schreiber	BC/YK	86.97	13	31.46	14	55.51
15	Thierry Ferland	QC	84.51	11	32.47	16	52.04
16	Cameron Hines	EO	80.69	16	28.32	15	52.37
17	Justin Wong	MB	75.11	17	24.86	17	50.25
18	Steven Lapointe	QC	71.18	18	24.11	18	47.07

=== Women ===
Rank	Name	Section	Total points	SP		FS	
1	Sarah Tamura	BC/YK	108.29	1	42.48	3	65.81
2	Kim Decelles	QC	105.72	2	41.38	6	64.34
3	Megan Yim	BC/YK	105.31	3	39.72	5	65.59
4	Jordyn Harper	CO	104.84	4	38.19	2	66.65
5	Triena Robinson	AB/NT/NU	104.72	6	35.99	1	68.73
6	Emma Cullen	EO	103.37	5	37.72	4	65.65
7	Rachel Lafleche	WO	91.09	7	35.74	11	55.35
8	Aislinn Ganci	AB/NT/NU	89.73	10	33.27	8	56.46
9	Alexis Dion	EO	88.83	9	33.28	9	55.55
10	Semi Won	CO	88.70	11	33.19	10	55.51
11	Alison Schumacher	WO	88.64	15	30.08	7	58.56
12	Grace Lin	QC	87.09	8	34.86	15	52.23
13	Maude Poulin	QC	85.22	12	32.58	14	52.64
14	Sabrina Vigneault	QC	84.94	13	32.11	13	52.83
15	Lily Markovski	CO	84.58	14	31.58	12	53.00
16	Sara Daoust	QC	81.68	16	29.89	17	51.79
17	Olivia Marleau	BC/YK	80.60	17	28.47	16	52.13
18	Valeriya Shkvarchuk	QC	74.06	18	25.66	18	48.40

=== Pairs ===
Rank	Name	Section	Total points	SP		FS	
1	Keelee Gingrich / Davin Portz	AB/NT/NU	108.06	2	38.62	1	69.44
2	Allison Eby / Brett Varley	WO	106.00	1	40.25	2	65.75
3	Naomie Boudreau / Cedric Savard	QC	97.60	3	38.17	3	59.43
4	Justine Brasseur / Jason Lapointe	QC	97.21	4	37.98	4	59.23
5	Lori-Ann Matte / Thierry Ferland	QC	91.56	9	32.89	5	58.67
6	Sarah-Jade Latulippe / Alex Leak	QC	89.02	6	33.80	6	55.22
7	Kendall Glen / Devon Stock	CO	88.11	8	33.00	7	55.11
8	Jamie Knoblauch / Nathan O Brien	WO	86.83	7	33.33	8	53.50
9	Kendra Digness / Eric Thiessen	AB/NT/NU	85.78	5	35.23	9	50.55
10	Lianna Thomas / Aaron Kugler	QC	79.28	10	30.41	10	48.87
WD	Renata Wong / Henry Su						
WD	Bryn Hoffman / Bryce Chudak						

=== Ice dancing ===
Rank	Name	Section	Total points	PD1		PD2		FD	
1	Valérie Taillefer / Jason Chan	QC	90.54	1	10.27	2	16.74	1	63.53
2	Hannah Whitley / Elliott Graham	CO	87.12	2	10.05	1	17.13	2	59.94
3	Megan Koenig-Croft / Jake Richardson	CO	80.54	6	9.06	3	16.39	3	55.09
4	Ceduna Magee / Lucas Kitteridge	AB/NT/NU	76.78	5	9.13	7	12.65	4	55.00
5	Ashlynne Stairs / Bradley Keeping-Myra	NS	76.10	4	9.18	4	15.01	7	51.91
6	Jazlyn Tabachniuk / Nikolas Wamsteeker	BC/YK	73.53	8	8.46	8	12.34	6	52.73
7	Ekaterina Fedyushchenko / Kaelan Dunker	CO	73.00	7	8.60	6	12.75	8	51.65
8	Vanessa Chartrand / Christian Reekie	EO	72.93	3	9.56	5	13.95	9	49.42
9	Sabrina Bédard / Zoé Duval-Yergeau	QC	72.41	9	7.47	9	11.96	5	52.98
10	Mira Samoisette / Alexander Seidel	QC	61.80	10	7.45	10	10.69	11	43.66
11	Sara Marier / Anthony Campanelli	QC	60.19	12	5.91	11	9.68	10	44.60
12	Natascha Collier / Lee Royer	AB/NT/NU	49.98	14	4.81	13	8.21	13	36.96
13	Nicola Salimova / Paul Ayer	AB/NT/NU	49.97	13	4.92	14	7.20	12	37.85
14	Alycia O leary / Oliver Grütter	QC	49.97	11	6.23	12	8.54	14	35.30
15	Emilie Huynh / Jeffery Wong	QC	42.76	15	4.51	15	6.23	15	32.02

== International team selections ==
=== Winter Olympics ===
The Olympic team was announced on January 12, 2014:

	Men	Ladies	Pairs	Ice dancing
1	Patrick Chan	Kaetlyn Osmond	Meagan Duhamel / Eric Radford	Tessa Virtue / Scott Moir
2	Kevin Reynolds	Gabrielle Daleman	Kirsten Moore-Towers / Dylan Moscovitch	Kaitlyn Weaver / Andrew Poje
3	Liam Firus		Paige Lawrence / Rudi Swiegers	Alexandra Paul / Mitchell Islam

=== Four Continents Championships ===
Skate Canada announced the Canadian team to the 2014 Four Continents Championships on January 20, 2014:

	Men	Ladies	Pairs	Ice dancing
1	Elladj Baldé	Amélie Lacoste	Natasha Purich / Mervin Tran	Piper Gilles / Paul Poirier
2	Nam Nguyen	Veronik Mallet	Margaret Purdy / Michael Marinaro	Nicole Orford / Thomas Williams
3	Jeremy Ten	Alaine Chartrand		Kharis Ralph / Asher Hill

=== World Junior Championships ===
Skate Canada announced the Canadian team to the 2014 World Junior Championships on Mar 7, 2014:

	Men	Ladies	Pairs	Ice dancing
1	Nam Nguyen	Alaine Chartrand	Tara Hancherow / Wesley Killing	Madeline Edwards / Zhao Kai Pang
2	Roman Sadovsky	Larkyn Austman	Mary Orr / Phelan Simpson	Mackenzie Bent / Garrett MacKeen

=== World Championships ===
Skate Canada announced the Canadian team to the 2014 World Championships on Mar 20, 2014:

	Men	Ladies	Pairs	Ice dancing
1	Kevin Reynolds	Kaetlyn Osmond	Meagan Duhamel / Eric Radford	Kaitlyn Weaver / Andrew Poje
2	Elladj Baldé	Gabrielle Daleman	Kirsten Moore-Towers / Dylan Moscovitch	Alexandra Paul / Mitchell Islam
3	Nam Nguyen		Paige Lawrence / Rudi Swiegers	Piper Gilles / Paul Poirier
