= Zang Wenbo =

Chinese figure skater (born 1996)

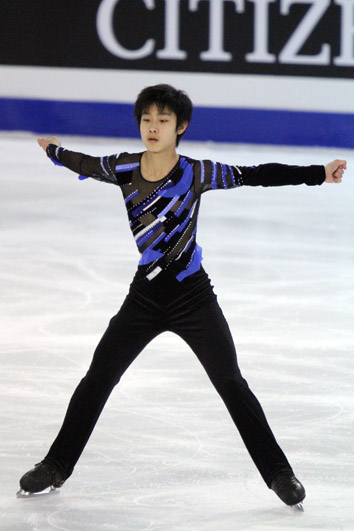
- 2010 World Junior Figure Skating Championships

Personal information
- Born: June 19, 1996 (age 30) Qiqihar, China
- Height: 1.73 m (5 ft 8 in)

Figure skating career
- Country: China
- Coach: Xu Ming
- Began skating: 2001

Zang Wenbo (Chinese: 臧文博; born June 19, 1996) is a Chinese figure skater. He competed at the 2010 World Junior Championships in The Hague, Netherlands and the 2014 World Junior Championships in Sofia, Bulgaria. At both events, he qualified for the free skate and finished 17th overall.

== Programs ==
Season	Short program	Free skating
2013–2014	La cumparsita by Gerardo Matos Rodríguez	The Matrix
2009–2010	Crouching Tiger, Hidden Dragon by Tan Dun	National Treasure by Trevor Rabin

== Competitive highlights ==
JGP: Junior Grand Prix

International
Event	09–10	10–11	11–12	12–13	13–14	14–15	15–16
Junior Worlds	17th				17th		
JGP Poland					4th		
JGP Slovakia					6th		
National
Chinese Champ.		8th	10th	7th	7th	13th	3rd
WD = Withdrew
