= Maria Sotskova =

Russian figure skater (born 2000)

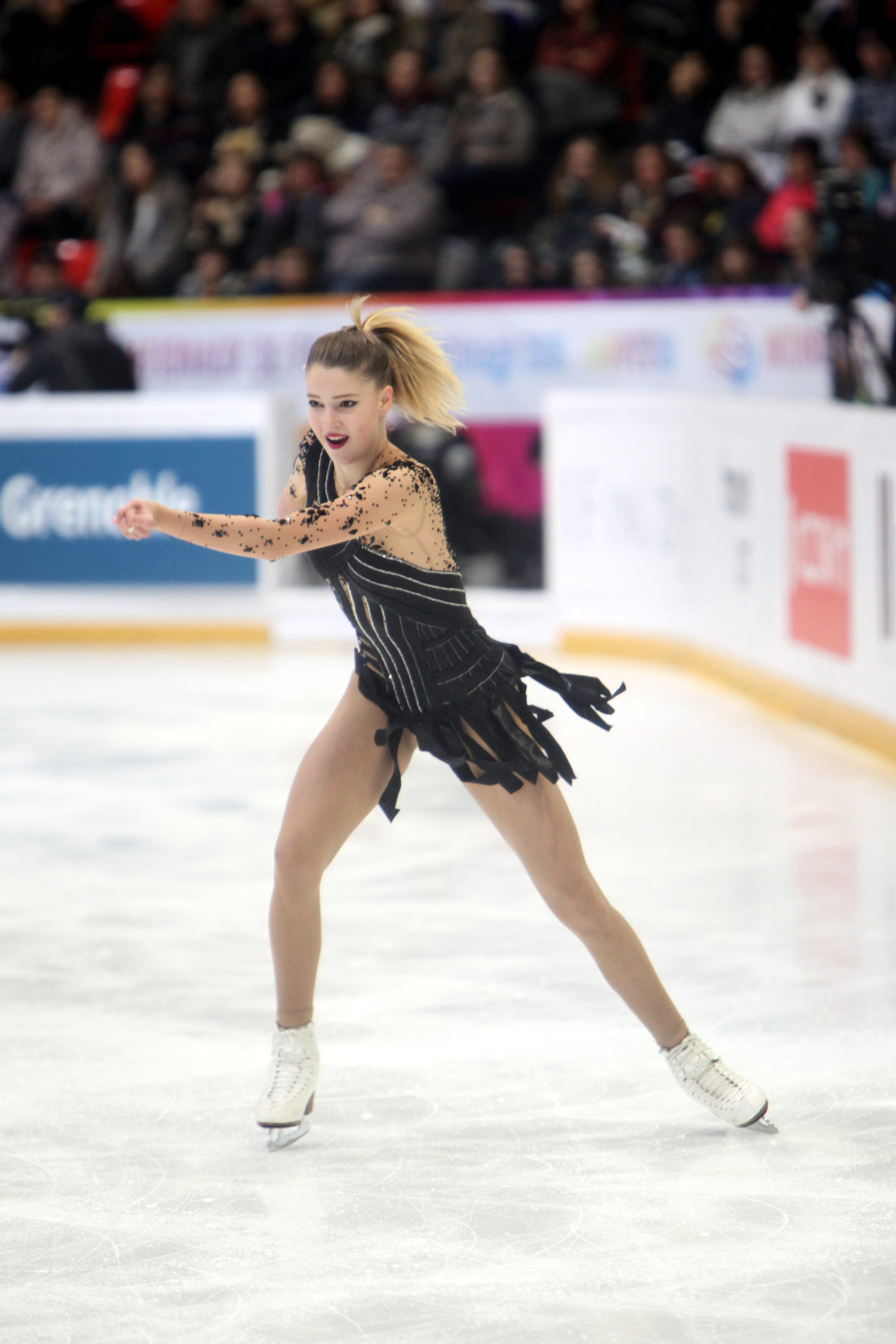
- Sotskova at the 2018 Internationaux de France

Personal information
- Native name: Мария Романовна Сотскова (Russian)
- Full name: Maria Romanovna Sotskova
- Born: 12 April 2000 (age 26) Reutov, Russia
- Home town: Reutov, Russia
- Height: 1.73 m (5 ft 8 in)

Figure skating career
- Country: Russia; Olympic Athletes from Russia (Russia not recognised in 2018 Olympics Winter Games)
- Coach: Svetlana Sokolovskaya
- Skating club: CSKA Moscow
- Began skating: 2003
- Retired: 2020
Medal record
Representing Russia
Figure skating: Ladies' singles
Grand Prix Final
Silver medal – second place	2017–18 Nagoya	Ladies' singles
Russian Championships
Silver medal – second place	2018 Saint Petersburg	Ladies' singles
Bronze medal – third place	2017 Chelyabinsk	Ladies' singles
Winter Youth Olympics
Silver medal – second place	2016 Lillehammer	Ladies' singles
World Junior Championships
Silver medal – second place	2016 Debrecen	Ladies' singles
Junior Grand Prix Final
Gold medal – first place	2013–14 Fukuoka	Ladies' singles
Silver medal – second place	2015–16 Barcelona	Ladies' singles

Maria Romanovna Sotskova (pron. SOT-skoh-vah; Russian: Мария Романовна Сотскова; born 12 April 2000) is a retired Russian figure skater. She is the 2017 Grand Prix Final silver medalist, a two-time Internationaux de France silver medalist (2016, 2017), the 2016 NHK Trophy bronze medalist, the 2017 CS Finlandia Trophy champion, and the 2018 Russian national silver medalist. She placed 8th at the 2017 and 2018 World Figure Skating Championships and at the 2018 Winter Olympics.

Earlier in her career, Sotskova won silver at the 2016 Winter Youth Olympics, silver at the 2016 World Junior Championships, and gold at the 2013 Junior Grand Prix Final.

== Personal life ==
Maria Romanovna Sotskova was born on 12 April 2000 in Reutov, Moscow Oblast, Russia. As a young child, she was engaged in both skating and rhythmic gymnastics but dropped gymnastics after her coach said that she needed to choose.

Sotskova plans to work in choreography and will begin an undergraduate degree at the Russian University of Theatre Arts - GITIS in the Ballet Masters program, from which graduates become either choreographers or tutors in the field of theatre, variety or sports choreography.

Sotskova's father died in June 2019.

== Skating career ==
=== Early years ===
Sotskova began skating as a four-year-old after her mother decided to bring her to an ice rink. Her first coach was Svetlana Panova. She won a bronze medal behind Serafima Sakhanovich at the 2013 Russian Junior Championships.

=== 2013–2014 season: JGP Final champion ===
Sotskova made her junior international debut at the 2013 Junior Grand Prix (JGP) event in Riga, Latvia; she won the silver medal behind Evgenia Medvedeva by a margin of 3.03 points. At her next JGP assignment, in Ostrava, Czech Republic, she finished second to Alexandra Proklova by over 15 points. Sotskova's silver medals qualified her for the JGP Final in Fukuoka, Japan, where she defeated teammates Sakhanovich and Medvedeva for the gold. She then took silver behind Sakhanovich at the 2014 Russian Junior Championships and was assigned to the 2014 World Junior Championships in Sofia, Bulgaria. She withdrew due to a meniscus injury.

=== 2014–2015 season: The second Junior season ===
During the 2014 JGP series, Sotskova took silver in Tallinn, Estonia, finishing second to Japan's Miyu Nakashio by 0.97, and then won gold in Zagreb, Croatia, by a margin of 1.4 points over Karen Chen of the United States. She finished fourth in Barcelona, Spain at her second JGP Final. Making her senior national debut, she placed sixth at the Russian Championships before winning the junior silver medal. Concluding her season, she placed fifth at the 2015 World Junior Championships in Tallinn.

=== 2015–2016 season: World Junior silver medalist ===
Sotskova at the 2016 World Junior Championships

In June 2015, Sotskova travelled to Artesia, California to have her programs choreographed, and to work with Rafael Arutyunyan on her jumps. Competing in the 2015 JGP series, she won gold in Riga, Latvia, and Linz, Austria, resulting in qualification to her third JGP Final. Her first senior gold medal came at the Tallinn Trophy, an ISU Challenger Series event in November. In December, at the JGP Final in Barcelona, Sotskova placed fourth in the short and second in the free skate, which brought her the silver medal behind teammate Polina Tsurskaya and ahead of Japan's Marin Honda.

At the Russian Championships, she finished fifth on the senior level, in December, and went on to win the junior silver medal behind Tsurskaya, in January. In February, Sotskova represented Russia at the 2016 Winter Youth Olympics in Hamar, Norway, winning the silver medal behind teammate Tsurskaya again. In March, she was awarded silver at the 2016 World Junior Championships in Debrecen, Hungary, between two Japanese Honda and Wakaba Higuchi. She was the only Russian to finish the competition, as her two teammates Polina Tsurskaya and Alisa Fedichkina withdrew right before the short skate and the free respectively, due to unexpected ankle injuries for both. Sotskova's silver medal secured the three spots for Russia in the next Junior World Champions, yet ended the Russia's five-year streak of World Junior ladies' titles.

Following the end of the season, she switched from Svetlana Panova to Elena Buianova due to CSKA Moscow's better training conditions.

Sotskova performing at the 2016–17 Grand Prix Final

=== 2016–2017 season: Senior debut ===
Sotskova began her season at the 2016 CS Ondrej Nepela Memorial, where she placed second in the short and first in the free skate to win the gold medal ahead of teammate Yulia Lipnitskaya. Making her Grand Prix debut, she won silver at the 2016 Trophée de France and bronze at the 2016 NHK Trophy, earning qualification to the Grand Prix Final in Marseille, France. In December, she finished fifth in France and then received the bronze medal at the Russian Championships, having ranked second in the short and third in the free skate, which made her qualify for European and World Champions in her first senior season. In January 2017, she placed fourth at the 2017 European Championships in Ostrava, Czech Republic, behind the bronze medalist Carolina Kostner by 18 points due to a messy free program. Two months later, at the 2017 World Championships in Helsinki, Finland, she placed sixth in the short, eleventh in the free, and eighth overall.

=== 2017–2018 season: Winter Olympics ===
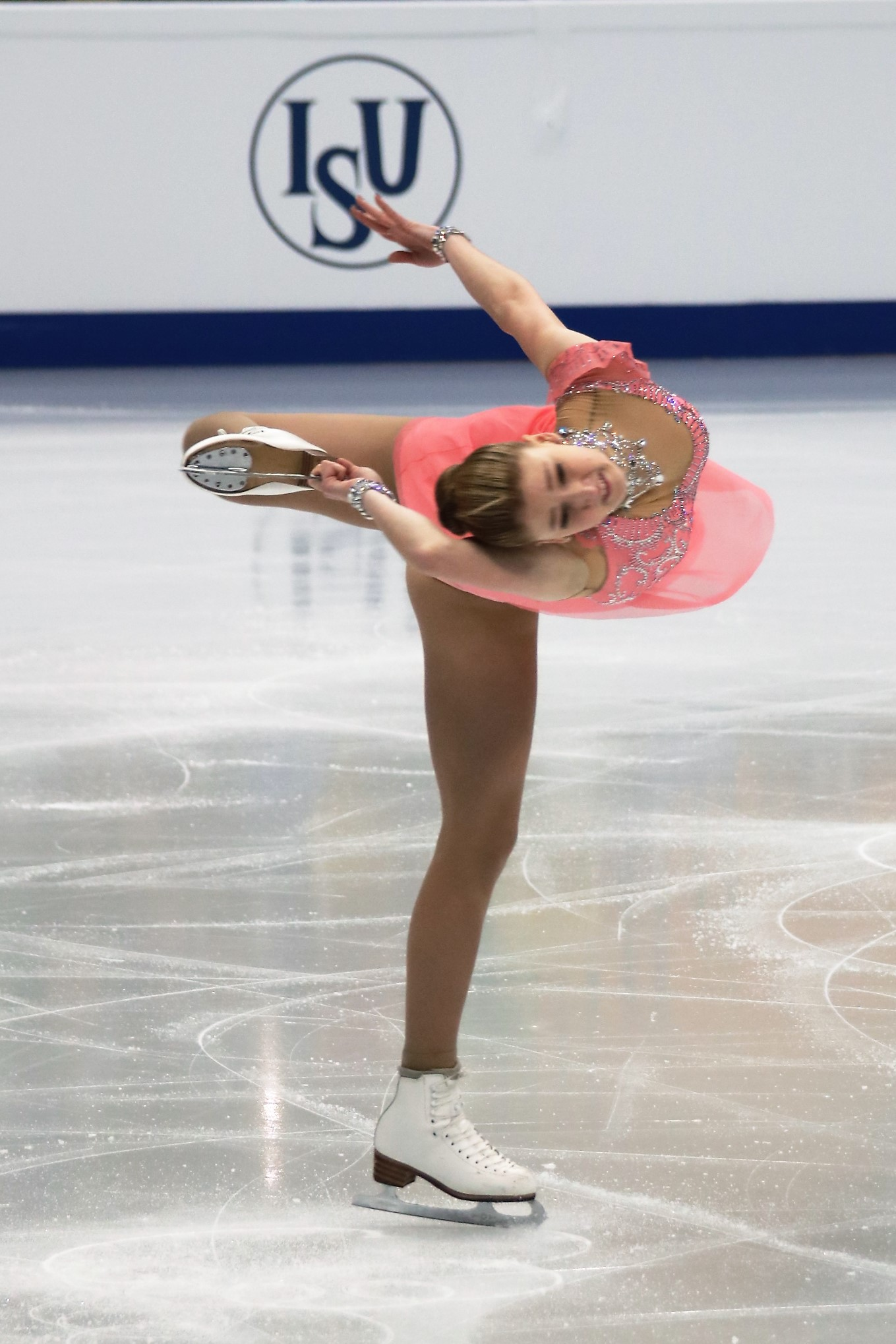
Sotskova performing a donut camel spin variation at the 2018 European Championships

After winning silver at the 2017 Skate Canada International and 2017 Internationaux de France, Sotskova qualified to her second Grand Prix Final. In December, she won two more silver medals, at the Grand Prix Final in Nagoya, Japan, and 2018 Russian Championships in Saint Petersburg.

At the 2018 European Championships, held in January in Moscow, Sotskova finished fourth, losing to teammates Alina Zagitova and Evgenia Medvedeva and Italy's Carolina Kostner. On the next day, she was named to the Russian Olympic team (together with Medvedeva and Zagitova). In February, Sotskova represented OAR (Olympic Athletes from Russia) in Pyeongchang, South Korea. She was not selected for the team event. Competing in individual ladies' singles, she placed twelfth in the short program, seventh in the free skate, and eighth overall. The following month, she ended up with the same final result at the 2018 World Championships in Milan, Italy, after placing fifth in the short and ninth in the free.

=== 2018–2019 season ===
Sotskova competing at the 2019 Russian Figure Skating Championships

Sotskova made her season debut at the 2018 Japan Open, where she placed sixth individually. Competing in her third Grand Prix season, she placed ninth at the 2018 NHK Trophy and seventh at the 2018 Internationaux de France. This was the first time Maria had not qualified for the Grand Prix Final. In early December she finished fifth at the 2018 CS Golden Spin of Zagreb after obtaining a season's best score of 179.18 points. It was the first time that season that she executed a triple flip-Euler-triple Salchow combination.

At the 2019 Russian Championships, Sotskova placed twelfth in the short program due to doubling her triple Lutz, therefore losing 3.8 points in base value. In the free skate, she made many errors on her jumps, including multiple falls and underrotations. She placed sixteenth in the free skate and sixteenth overall. She was named as the second alternate to the 2019 Winter Universiade, and after the withdrawals of teammates Elizaveta Tuktamysheva and Evgenia Medvedeva, she was added to the team along with Stanislava Konstantinova. She placed seventh there with a total score of 170.20, the lowest score of her senior career.

At the end of her season, Sotskova made the decision to part ways with coach Elena Buianova and joined Svetlana Sokolovskaya's training group. The parting was amicable.

=== 2019–2020 season ===
In the early season, Sotskova was ninth at the 2019 CS Ondrej Nepela Memorial and eighth at the Denis Ten Memorial Challenge. At her lone Grand Prix assignment, the 2019 Internationaux de France, she was eleventh of eleven skaters. She later withdrew from the Russian Nationals.

In July 2020, she announced her retirement from competitive skating.

Over two months after her retirement, she received a 10-year disqualification from the sport by the Russian Anti-Doping Agency for forging a medical certificate to explain a doping violation; it was later reported that Sotskova was using the banned diuretic furosemide. The Figure Skating Federation of Russia issued a verdict in March 2021 based on the RUSADA decision to disqualify Sotskova until April 5, 2030, backdating the start of her ban to April 2020.

== Programs ==
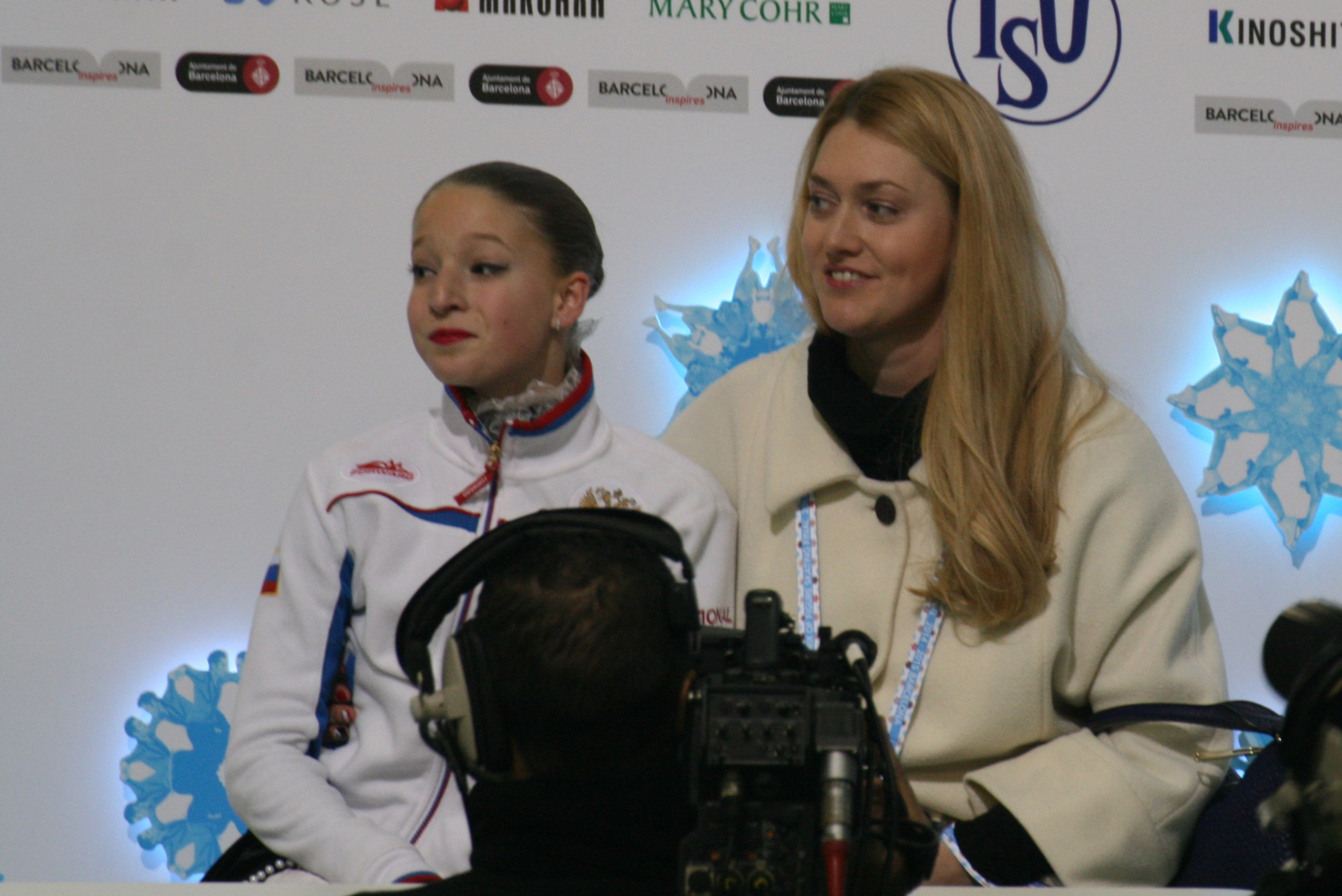
Sotskova with her former coach, Svetlana Panova

Season	Short program	Free skating	Exhibition
2019–2020	To Build a Home by The Cinematic Orchestra, Patrick Watson choreo. by Nikolai Morozov	Fifty Shades of Grey choreo. by Nikita Mikhailov	
2018–2019	Santana choreo. by Peter Tchernyshev	Summertime by George Gershwin choreo. by Peter Tchernyshev	Kalinka by Ivan Larionov; L-O-V-E by Natalie Cole
2017–2018	Swan Lake by Pyotr Ilyich Tchaikovsky	Clair de Lune by Claude Debussy	Kalinka by Ivan Larionov
2016–2017	Agitato I; Waltz of Farewell (from The Story of an Unknown Actor); V. Rondo: Agitato (from Concerto Grosso No. 1) by Alfred Schnittke choreo. by Nikita Mikhailov	At the Manilovs (from Dead Souls) by Alfred Schnittke choreo. by Peter Tchernyshev	All by Myself performed by Celine Dion
2015–2016	Black Magic Woman performed by Carlos Santana choreo. by Nadezda Kanaeva, Ilona Protasenia	Romeo and Juliet; The Young Juliet; Montagues and Capulets by Sergei Prokofiev choreo. by Vera Arutyunyan	Writing's on the Wall by Sam Smith
2014–2015	Winter (from The Four Seasons) by Antonio Vivaldi choreo. by Ilona Protasenia	Funny Face by George Gershwin, Ira Gershwin; Breakfast at Tiffany's by Henry Mancini choreo. by Vera Arutyunyan	Tous les garçons et les filles by Françoise Hardy
2013–2014	Winter (from The Four Seasons) by Antonio Vivaldi choreo. by Ilona Protasenia; Nuevo Tango by Viejos Aires choreo. by Ilona Protasenia	Pina by Thomas Hanreich choreo. by Ilona Protasenia	Nuevo Tango by Viejos Aires choreo. by Ilona Protasenia
2012–2013	Nuevo Tango by Viejos Aires choreo. by Ilona Protasenia	Pina by Thomas Hanreich choreo. by Ilona Protasenia	
2011–2012	Nuevo Tango by Viejos Aires choreo. by Ilona Protasenia	Nocturne No. 20 in C-sharp minor by Frédéric Chopin choreo. by Ilona Protasenia	

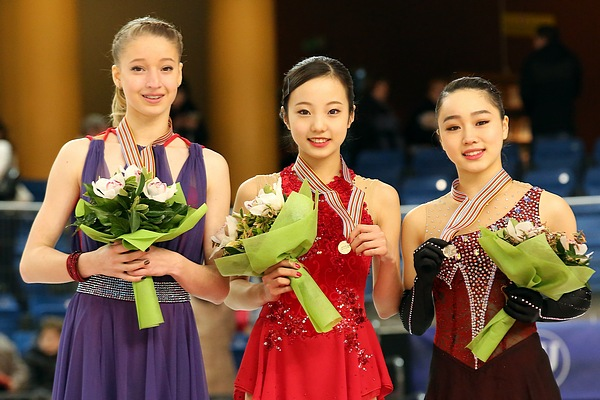
Sotskova at the 2016 World Junior Championships podium

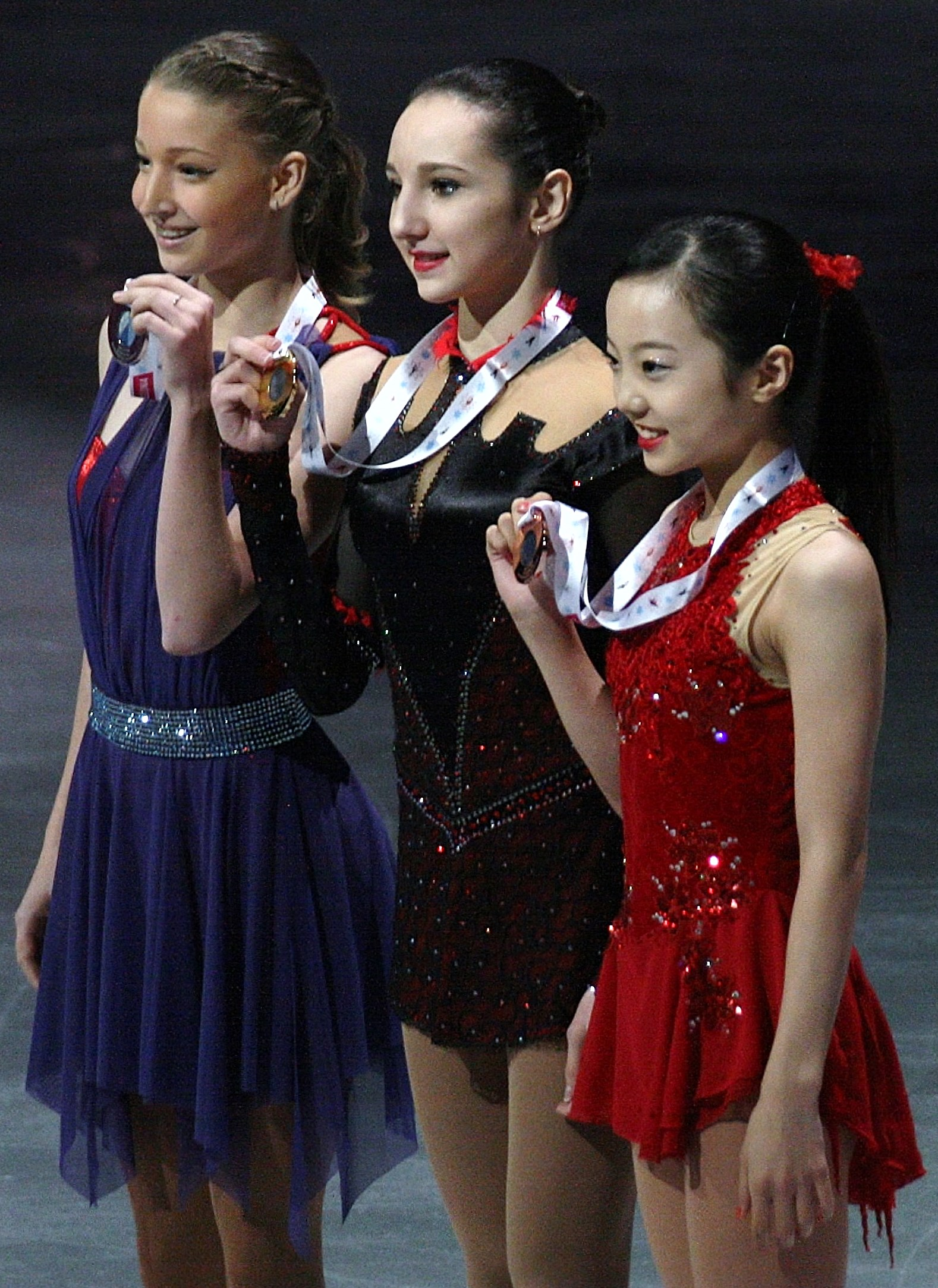
Sotskova (left) alongside medalists at the 2015 Junior Grand Prix Final

== Competitive highlights ==
GP: Grand Prix; CS: Challenger Series; JGP: Junior Grand Prix

International
Event	12–13	13–14	14–15	15–16	16–17	17–18	18–19	19–20
Olympics						8th		
Worlds					8th	8th		
Europeans					4th	4th		
GP Final					5th	2nd		
GP France					2nd	2nd	7th	11th
GP NHK Trophy					3rd		9th	
GP Skate Canada						2nd		
CS Finlandia						1st	WD	
CS Golden Spin							5th	
CS Ondrej Nepela					1st			9th
CS Tallinn Trophy				1st				
Denis Ten MC								8th
Shanghai Trophy						3rd		
Universiade							7th	
International: Junior
Youth Olympics				2nd				
Junior Worlds		WD	5th	2nd				
JGP Final		1st	4th	2nd				
JGP Austria				1st				
JGP Croatia			1st					
JGP Czech Rep.		2nd						
JGP Estonia			2nd					
JGP Latvia		2nd		1st				
National
Russia			6th	5th	3rd	2nd	16th	WD
Russia: Junior	3rd	2nd	2nd	2nd				
Team events
Japan Open							2nd T 6th P	

== Detailed results ==
=== Senior level ===
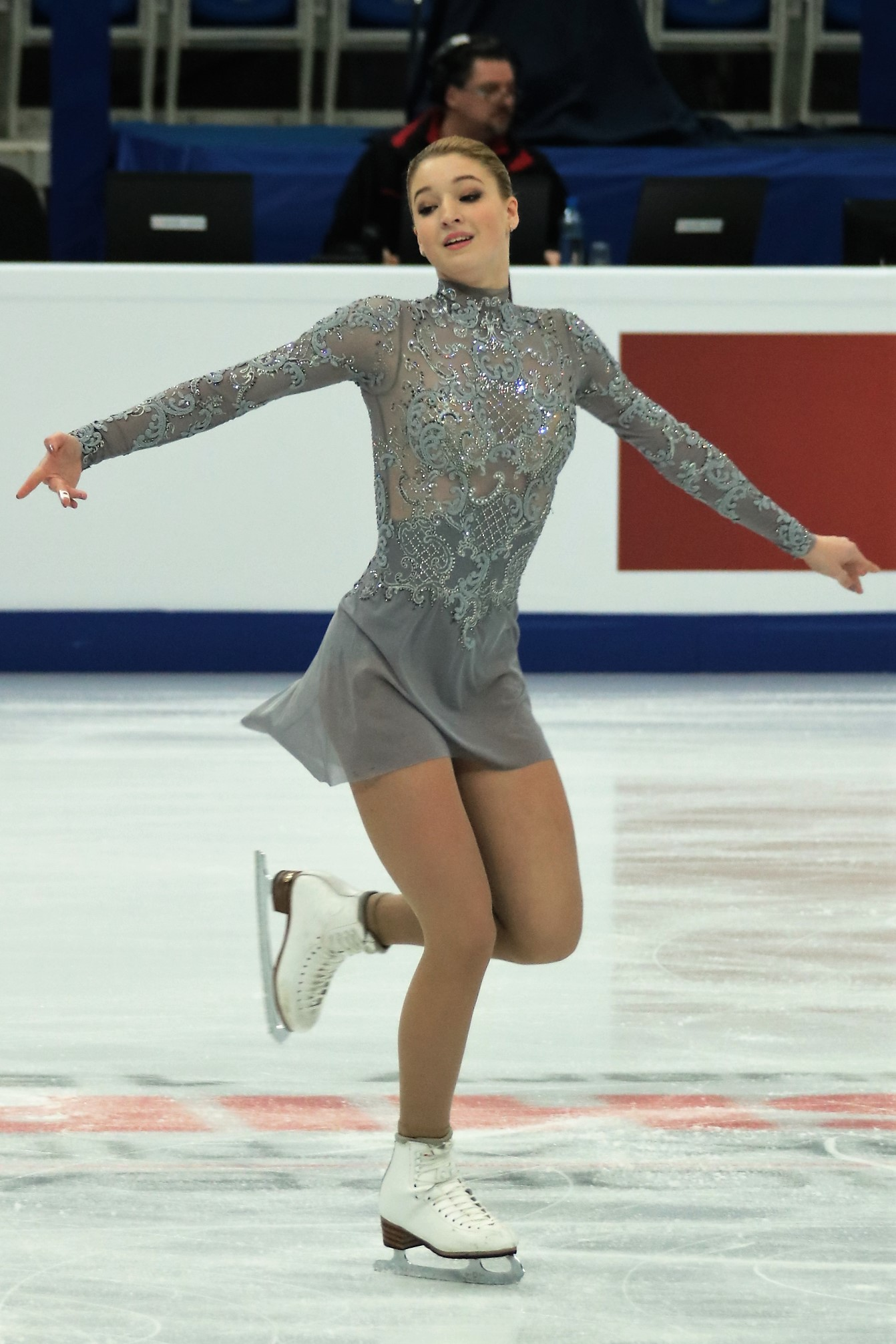
Sotskova at the 2018 European Championships.

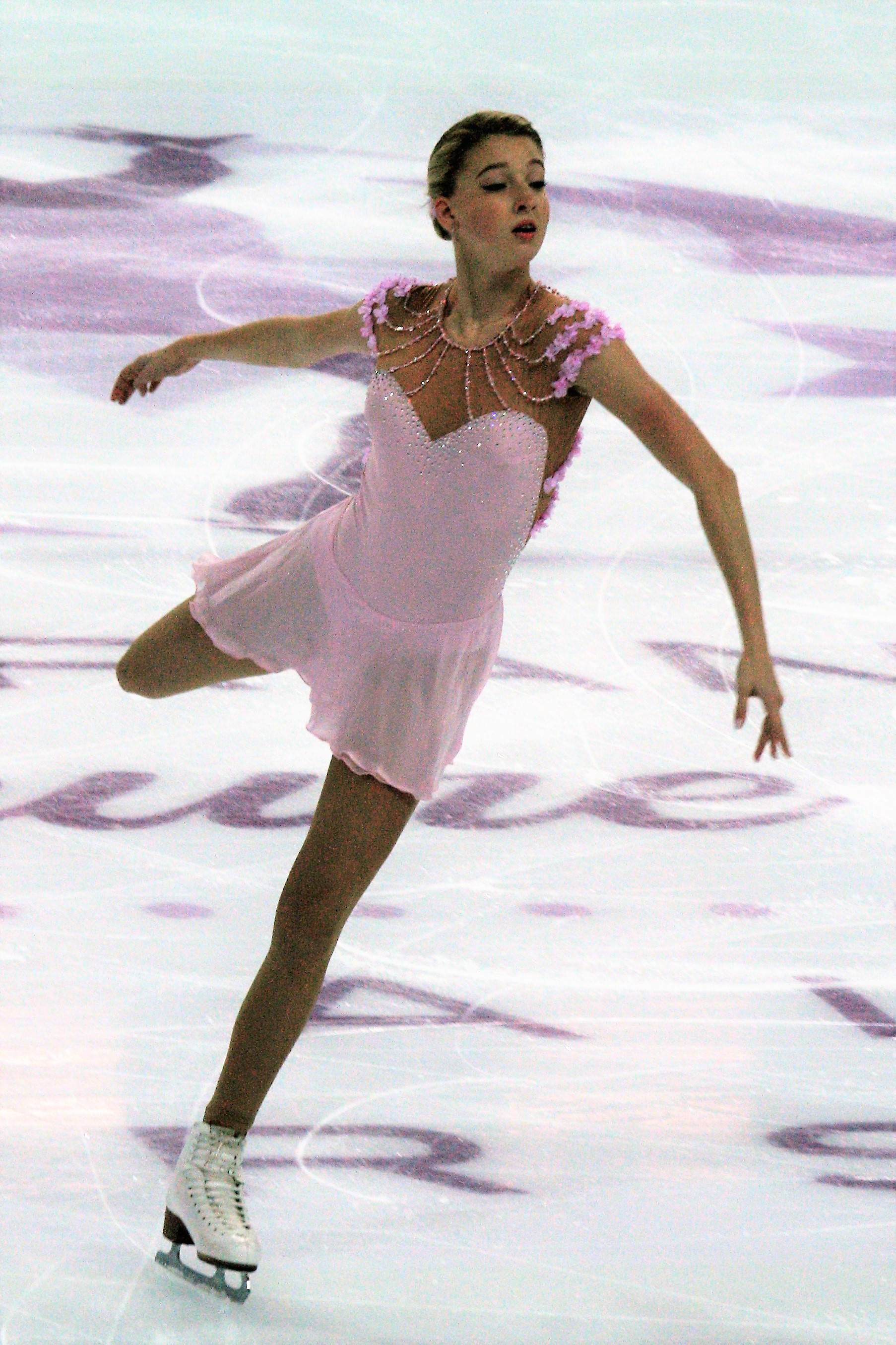
Sotskova at the 2016–17 Grand Prix Final

Small medals for short and free programs awarded only at ISU Championships.

2019–20 season
Date	Event	SP	FS	Total
1–3 November 2019	2019 Internationaux de France	11; 50.38	11; 94.51	11; 144.89
9–12 October 2019	2019 Denis Ten Memorial Challenge	7; 49.80	8; 84.77	8; 134.57
19–21 September 2019	2019 CS Ondrej Nepela Memorial	10; 48.93	7; 106.32	9; 155.25
2018–19 season
Date	Event	SP	FS	Total
7–9 March 2019	2019 Winter Universiade	7; 58.43	6; 111.77	7; 170.20
19–23 December 2018	2019 Russian Championships	12; 65.73	16; 114.17	16; 179.90
5–8 December 2018	2018 CS Golden Spin of Zagreb	5; 60.35	5; 119.37	5; 179.72
23–25 November 2018	2018 Internationaux de France	5; 61.76	7; 115.83	7; 177.59
9–11 November 2018	2018 NHK Trophy	9; 60.75	9; 116.24	9; 176.99
6 October 2018	2018 Japan Open	–	6; 111.78	6P/2T
2017–18 season
Date	Event	SP	FS	Total
19–25 March 2018	2018 World Championships	5; 71.80	9; 124.81	8; 196.61
14–25 February 2018	2018 Winter Olympics	12; 63.86	7; 134.24	8; 198.10
15–21 January 2018	2018 European Championships	4; 68.70	3; 132.11	4; 200.81
21–24 December 2017	2018 Russian Championships	2; 76.39	2; 145.37	2; 221.76
7–10 December 2017	2017–18 Grand Prix Final	4; 74.00	2; 142.28	2; 216.28
24–26 November 2017	2017 Shanghai Trophy	–	3; 128.18	3
17–19 November 2017	2017 Internationaux de France	2; 67.79	2; 140.99	2; 208.78
27–29 October 2017	2017 Skate Canada	3; 66.10	2; 126.42	2; 192.52
6–8 October 2017	2017 CS Finlandia Trophy	2; 67.69	1; 137.61	1; 205.30
2016-17 season
Date	Event	SP	FS	Total
29 March – 2 April 2017	2017 World Championships	6; 69.76	11; 122.44	8; 192.20
25–29 January 2017	2017 European Championships	4; 72.17	5; 120.35	4; 192.52
20–26 December 2016	2017 Russian Championships	2; 74.39	3; 145.51	3; 219.90
8–11 December 2016	2016–17 Grand Prix Final	6; 65.74	5; 133.05	5; 198.79
25–27 November 2016	2016 NHK Trophy	2; 69.96	3; 125.92	3; 195.88
11–13 November 2016	2016 Trophée de France	3; 68.71	2; 131.64	2; 200.35
29 September - 1 October	2016 Ondrej Nepela Trophy	2; 61.58	1; 128.38	1; 189.96

=== Junior level ===
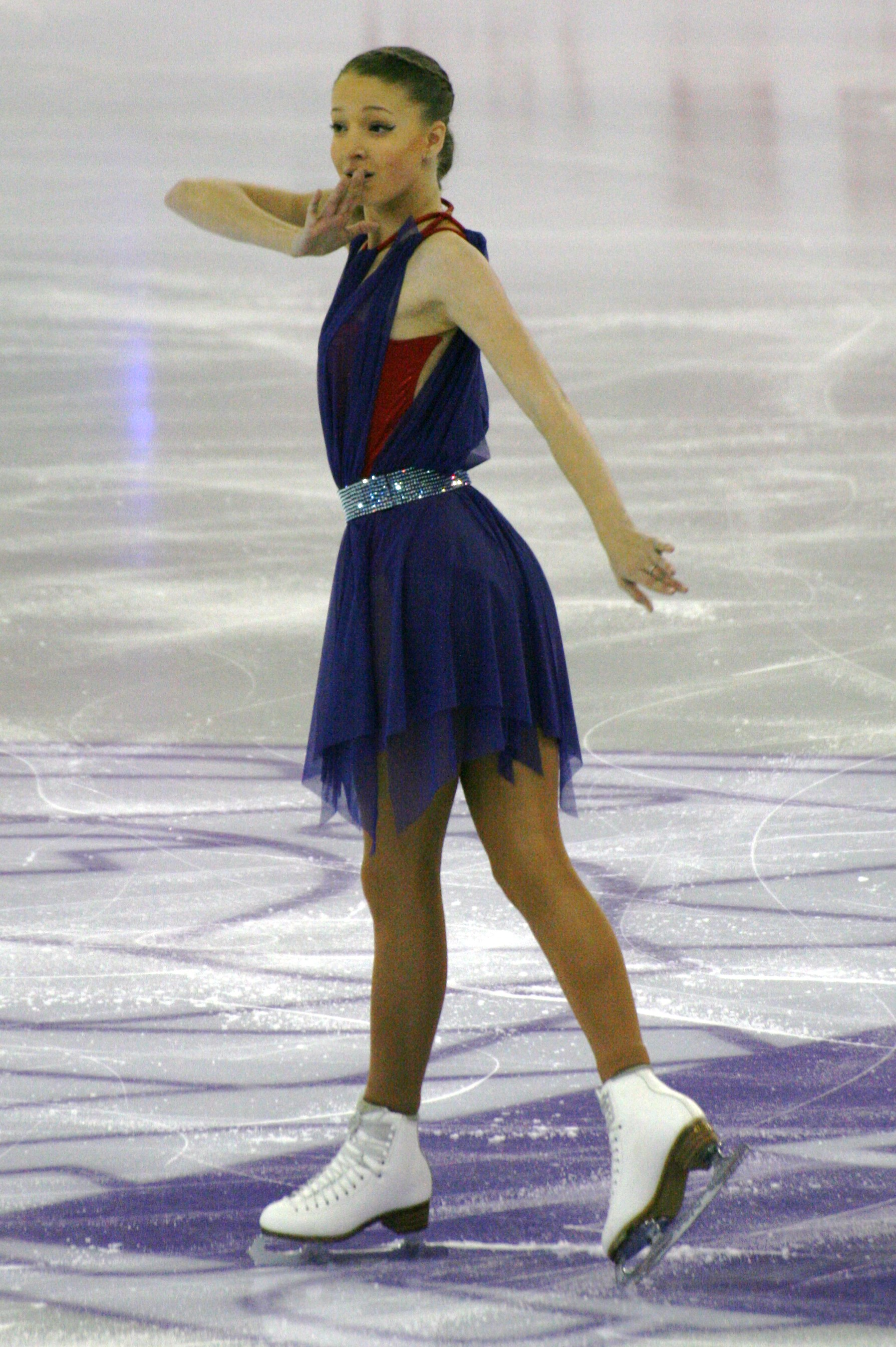
Sotskova at the 2015–16 Junior Grand Prix Final

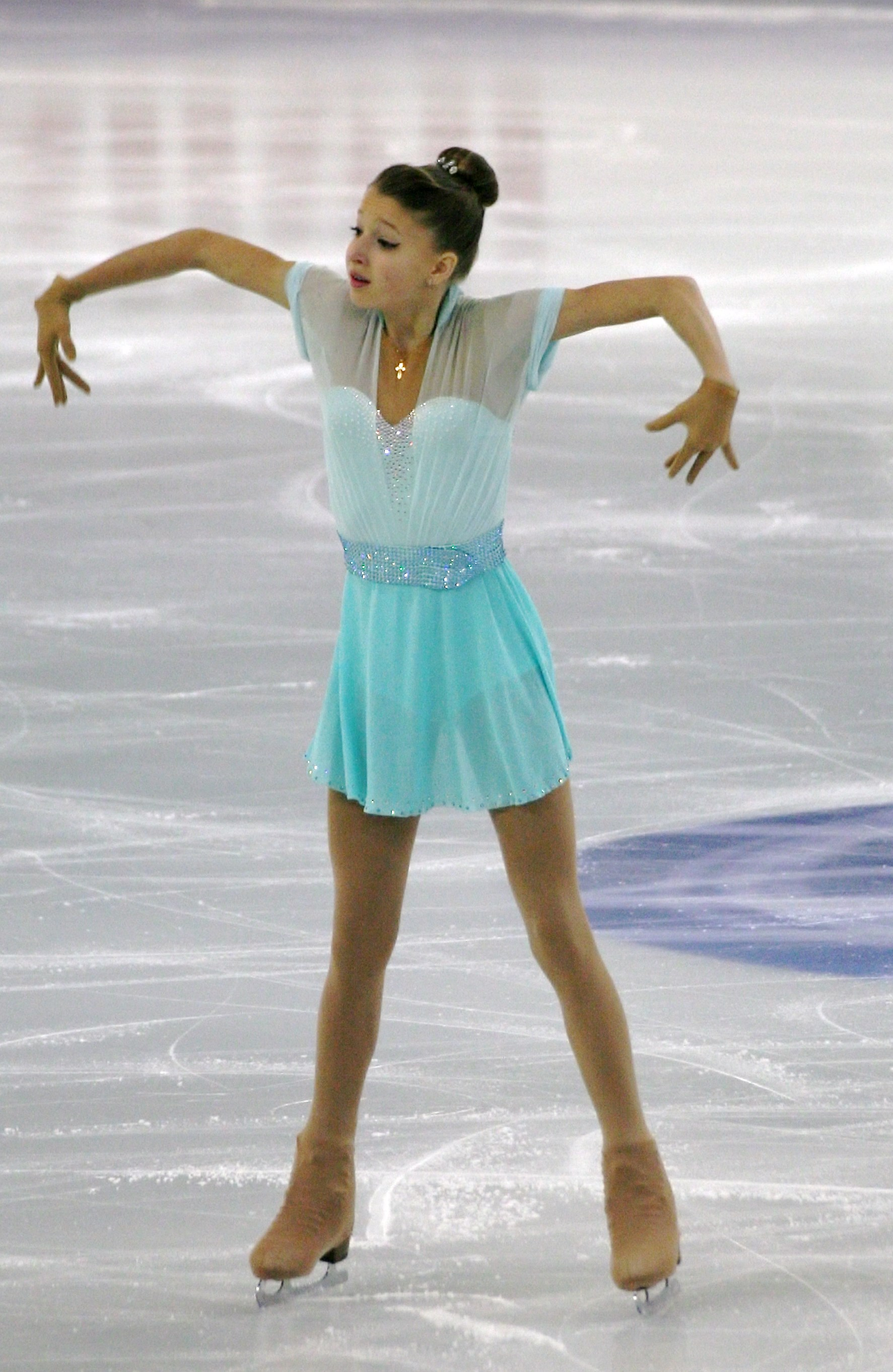
Sotskova at the 2014–15 Junior Grand Prix Final

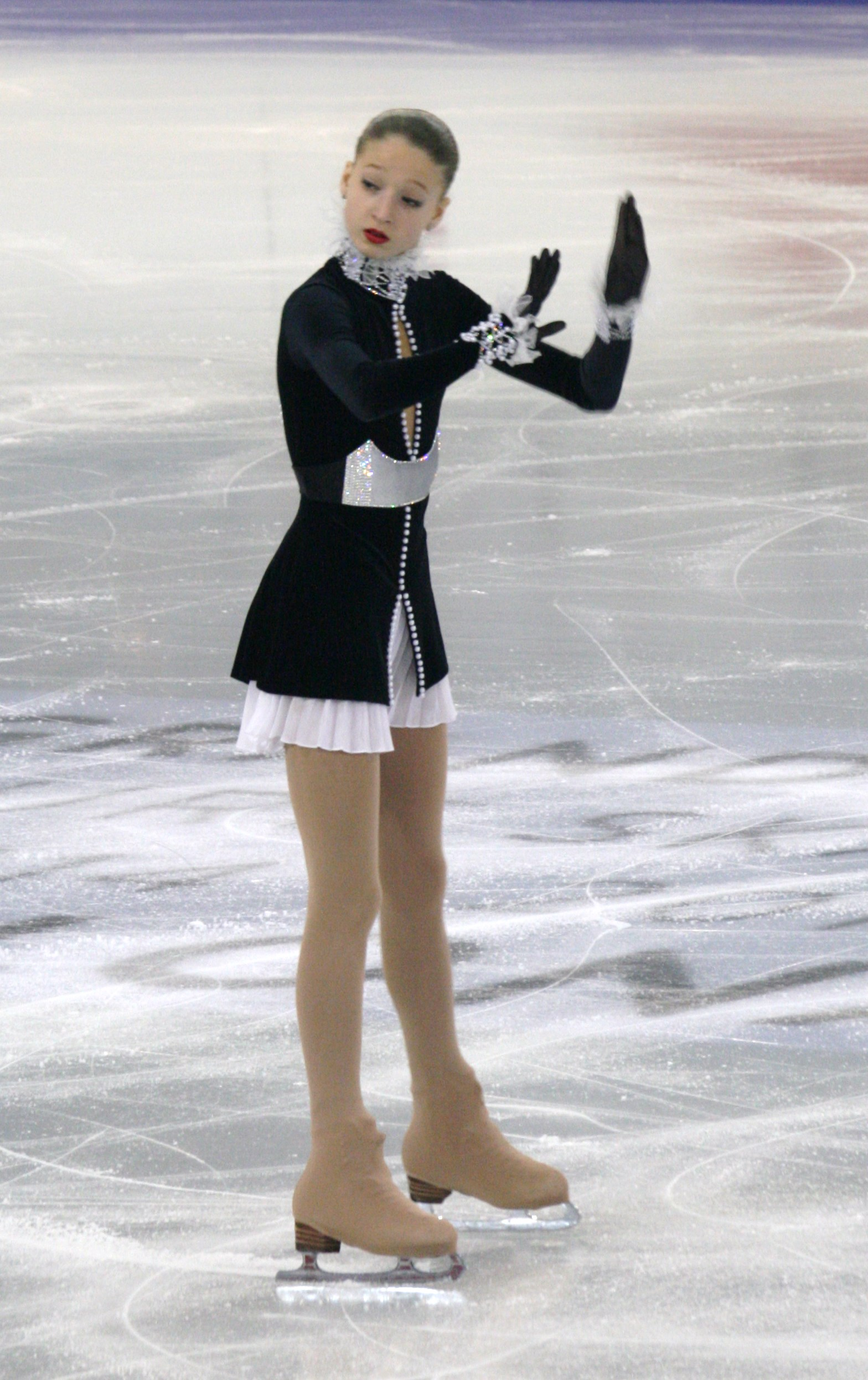
Sotskova at the 2013–14 Junior Grand Prix Final

Small medals for short and free programs awarded only at ISU Championships.

2015–16 season
Date	Event	Level	SP	FS	Total
14–20 March 2016	2016 World Junior Championships	Junior	3; 64.78	3; 123.94	2; 188.72
12–21 February 2016	2016 Winter Youth Olympics	Junior	8; 53.40	2; 116.10	2; 169.50
19–23 January 2016	2016 Russian Junior Championships	Junior	2; 67.70	2; 124.11	2; 191.81
24–27 December 2015	2016 Russian Championships	Senior	8; 66.14	4; 135.18	5; 201.32
10–13 December 2015	2015−16 JGP Final	Junior	4; 62.64	2; 121.37	2; 184.01
17–22 November 2015	2015 Tallinn Trophy	Senior	1; 64.82	1; 121.48	1; 186.30
9–12 September 2015	2015 JGP Austria	Junior	2; 62.97	1; 122.47	1; 185.44
27–30 August 2015	2015 JGP Latvia	Junior	2; 62.73	1; 121.72	1; 184.45
2014–15 season
Date	Event	Level	SP	FS	Total
2–8 March 2015	2015 World Junior Championships	Junior	10; 53.95	5; 115.09	5; 169.04
4–7 February 2015	2015 Russian Junior Championships	Junior	2; 65.93	3; 120.37	2; 186.30
24–27 December 2014	2015 Russian Championships	Senior	8; 61.66	6; 124.40	6; 186.06
11–14 December 2014	2014–15 JGP Final	Junior	4; 62.28	4; 113.71	4; 175.99
8–11 October 2014	2014 JGP Croatia	Junior	2; 58.48	1; 112.33	1; 170.81
24–27 September 2014	2014 JGP Estonia	Junior	2; 52.06	2; 107.61	2; 159.67
2013–14 season
Date	Event	Level	SP	FS	Total
23–25 January 2014	2014 Russian Junior Championships	Junior	2; 64.26	2; 127.43	2; 191.69
5–6 December 2013	2013–14 JGP Final	Junior	1; 61.29	1; 115.46	1; 176.75
3–5 October 2013	2013 JGP Czech Republic	Junior	3; 57.74	2; 107.85	2; 165.59
29–30 August 2013	2013 JGP Latvia	Junior	1; 59.45	2; 107.04	2; 166.49
2012–13 season
Date	Event	Level	SP	FS	Total
2–3 February 2013	2013 Russian Junior Championships	Junior	7; 58.83	3; 122.29	3; 181.12
