= Madeline Edwards =

Canadian ice dancer

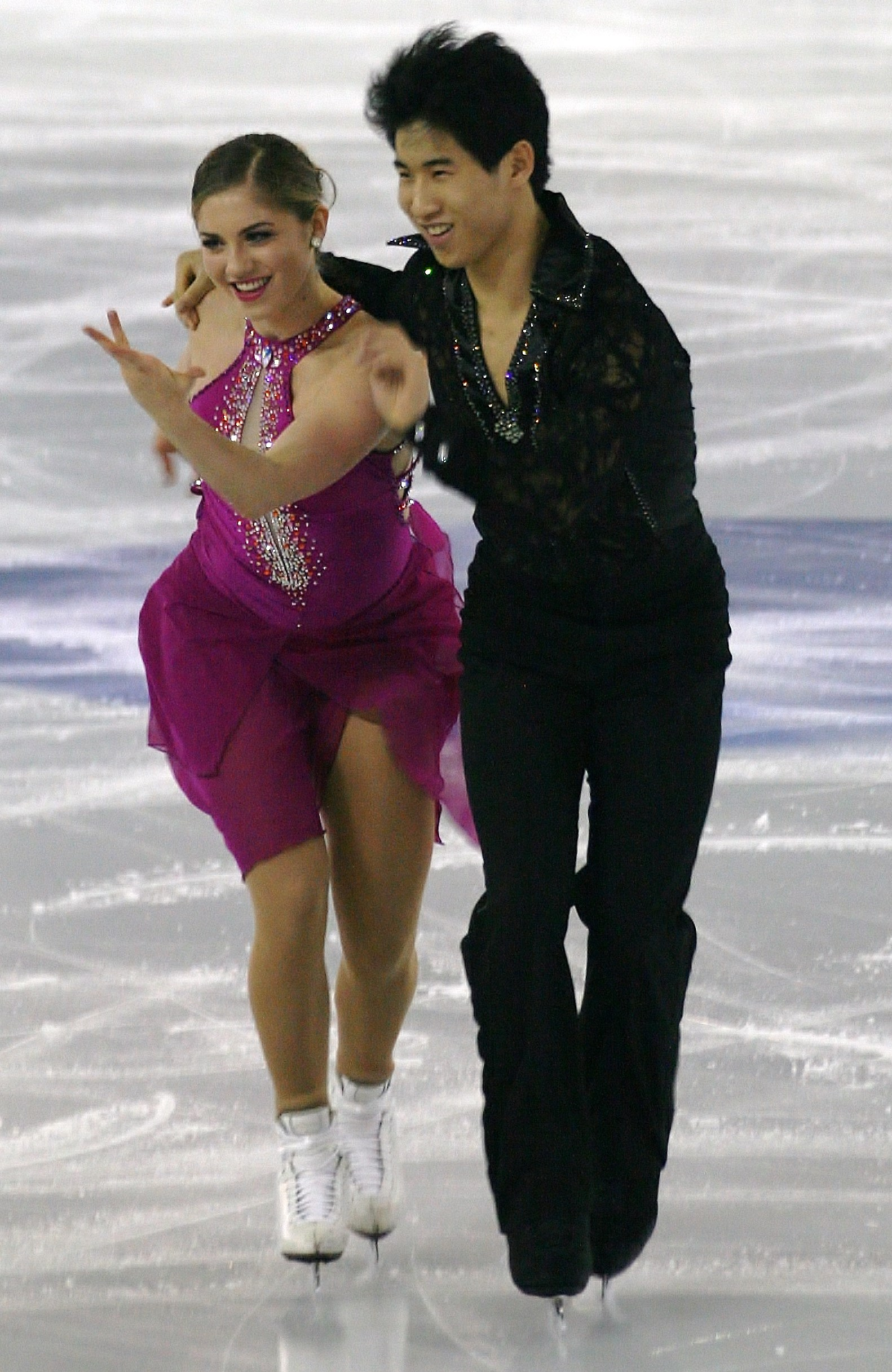
- Edwards/Pang in 2014

Personal information
- Born: June 14, 1996 (age 30) Trail, British Columbia
- Home town: Port Moody, British Columbia
- Height: 1.64 m (5 ft 4 1/2 in)

Figure skating career
- Country: Canada
- Coach: Megan Wing; Aaron Lowe
- Skating club: Inlet SC Port Moody
- Began skating: 2000
Medal record
Representing Canada
Figure skating: Ice dancing
World Junior Championships
| Bronze medal – third place | 2014 Sofia | Ice dancing |

Madeline Edwards (born June 14, 1996) is a Canadian ice dancer. With former partner Zhao Kai Pang, she is the 2014 World Junior bronze medalist and 2013 Canadian Junior Champion.

== Career ==
Madeline Edwards teamed with Zhao Kai Pang in December 2007. They debuted on the ISU Junior Grand Prix series in 2011, placing fifth in Austria. The following season, they won a pair of bronze medals at their JGP assignments, in France and Turkey, and gold in the junior event at the 2013 Canadian Championships. They were sent to the 2013 World Junior Championships, where they finished 12th.

In the 2013–14 season, Edwards and Pang won two JGP medals, silver in Mexico and bronze in the Czech Republic. Because Skate Canada required junior champions to move up, they competed on the senior level domestically, with a different pattern in the short dance and an additional 30 seconds in the free dance. They finished seventh at the 2014 Canadian Championships. At the 2014 World Junior Championships, they won the bronze medal after placing fifth in the short dance and third in the free dance.

Edwards and Pang continued competing on the JGP series in the 2014–15 season. They were awarded silver in Courchevel, France, finishing second to Russia's Alla Loboda / Pavel Drozd by a margin of 2.82 points. After edging Loboda/Drozd by 0.44 to win gold in Aichi, Japan, they qualified for the JGP Final in Barcelona, where they placed fifth. Edwards injured her ankle during training in late December 2014. Ranked sixth in the short and fourth in the free dance, the duo finished sixth at the 2015 World Junior Championships in Tallinn, Estonia.

Edwards and Pang sat out the 2015–16 season to allow her ankle to fully heal. His retirement in July 2016 ended the partnership.

== Programs ==
(with Pang)

| Season | Short dance | Free dance | Exhibition |
|---|---|---|---|
| 2015–16 | | Misa Tango by Luis Bacalov choreo. by Mark Pillay | |
| 2014–15 | Junior-level: Chi Samba by Toni Braxton, Edmundo Ros; Rhumba: Eres todo en me by Ana Gabriel; Chi Samba by Toni Braxton, Edmundo Ros; Senior-level: Paso: Flamenco: | Beautiful That Way; Il Tema Della Tata by Nicola Piovani; Hobson's Choice: Act 3, Finale by Paul Reade | You and I by Ingrid Michaelson |
| 2013–14 | Foxtrot: It's De-Lovely; Quickstep: Anything Goes | Les Misérables; Bring Him Home performed by Colm Wilkinson; Master of the House; One Day More | I Put a Spell on You performed by Nina Simone |
| 2012–13 | Why Don't You Do Right; Mr. Pinstripe Suit by Big Bad Voodoo Daddy | The Artist by Ludovic Bource; George Valentin; Waltz for Peppy; Peppy and George | |
| 2011–12 | Rie Y Lora by Celia Cruz; Mujer Latina by Thalia | Notre-Dame de Paris by Riccardo Cocciante; Les Temps des Cathedrales; Dechiré; Les Oiseaux Qu'on Met en Cage performed by Garou and Hélène Ségara; Les Temps des Cathedrales | |
| 2010–11 | | The Muppets; Happy Feet | |
| 2009–10 | | Tango Innominato by Caravan Gypsy Swing Ensemble; Minor Swing (from Chocolat) by Rachel Portman | |
| 2008–09 | | Cuban Pete by Tito Puente; Mambo Jambo | |

== Competitive highlights ==
JGP: Junior Grand Prix

With Pang

International
| Event | 10–11 | 11–12 | 12–13 | 13–14 | 14–15 |
|---|---|---|---|---|---|
| Junior Worlds | | | 12th | 3rd | 6th |
| JGP Final | | | | | 5th |
| JGP Austria | | 5th | | | |
| JGP Czech Rep. | | | | 3rd | |
| JGP France | | | 3rd | | 2nd |
| JGP Japan | | | | | 1st |
| JGP Mexico | | | | 2nd | |
| JGP Turkey | | | 3rd | | |
National
| Canadian Champ. | 1st N | 2nd J | 1st J | 7th | 7th |
Levels – N: Novice, J: Junior
