= 2014–15 Grand Prix of Figure Skating Final =

2014–15 Grand Prix Final
- Type: Grand Prix
- Date: December 11 – 14, 2014
- Season: 2014–15
- Location: Barcelona, Spain
- Host: Spanish Ice Sports Federation
- Venue: CCIB - Centre de Convencions Internacional de Barcelona

Champions
- Men's singles: (Japan) Yuzuru Hanyu (S) (Japan) Shoma Uno (J)
- Ladies' singles: (Russia) Elizaveta Tuktamysheva (S) (Russia) Evgenia Medvedeva (J)
- Pairs: (Canada) Meagan Duhamel / Eric Radford (S) (Canada) Julianne Séguin / Charlie Bilodeau (J)
- Ice dance: (Canada) Kaitlyn Weaver / Andrew Poje (S) (Russia) Anna Yanovskaya / Sergey Mozgov (J)
- Previous: 2013–14 Grand Prix Final
- Next: 2015–16 Grand Prix Final
- Previous Grand Prix: 2014 NHK Trophy

The 2014–15 Grand Prix of Figure Skating Final and ISU Junior Grand Prix Final were held from December 11–14, 2014, in Barcelona, Spain. The combined event was the culmination of two international series: the Grand Prix of Figure Skating and the Junior Grand Prix. Medals were awarded in men's singles, women's singles, pair skating, and ice dance at both the senior and junior levels.

== Records ==
The following new junior ISU best scores were set during this competition:

Disc.	Segment	Skater(s)	Score	Date	Ref.
Ladies	Short program	(Russia) Evgenia Medvedeva	67.09	December 11, 2014	
Men	Short program	(Japan) Sota Yamamoto	76.14	December 11, 2014	
Men	Free skating	(Japan) Shoma Uno	163.06	December 12, 2014	
Men	Total score	(Japan) Shoma Uno	238.27	December 12, 2014	

== Qualifiers ==
=== Senior qualifiers ===
No.	Men	Ladies	Pairs	Ice dance
1	(Russia) Maxim Kovtun	(Russia) Elena Radionova	(Russia) Ksenia Stolbova / Fedor Klimov	(United States) Madison Chock / Evan Bates
2	(Spain) Javier Fernández	(Russia) Elizaveta Tuktamysheva	(Canada) Meagan Duhamel / Eric Radford	(Canada) Kaitlyn Weaver / Andrew Poje
3	(Japan) Tatsuki Machida	(Russia) Anna Pogorilaya	(Russia) Yuko Kavaguti / Alexander Smirnov	(France) Gabriella Papadakis / Guillaume Cizeron
4	(Japan) Takahito Mura	(United States) ~~Gracie Gold~~ (withdrew)	(China) Peng Cheng / Zhang Hao	(United States) Maia Shibutani / Alex Shibutani
5	(Russia) Sergei Voronov	(Russia) Yulia Lipnitskaya	(China) Sui Wenjing / Han Cong	(Canada) Piper Gilles / Paul Poirier
6	(Japan) Yuzuru Hanyu	(United States) Ashley Wagner	(China) Yu Xiaoyu / Jin Yang	(Russia) Elena Ilinykh / Ruslan Zhiganshin

Alternates

No.	Men	Women	Pairs	Ice dance
1	(United States) Jason Brown	(Japan) Rika Hongo (called up)	(Russia) Evgenia Tarasova / Vladimir Morozov	(Russia) Ksenia Monko / Kirill Khaliavin
2	(Kazakhstan) Denis Ten	(Japan) Satoko Miyahara	(United States) Haven Denney / Brandon Frazier	(United States) Madison Hubbell / Zachary Donohue
3	(Canada) Nam Nguyen	(Japan) Kanako Murakami	(China) Wang Xuehan / Wang Lei	(United Kingdom) Penny Coomes / Nicholas Buckland

Gracie Gold was forced to withdraw due to an injury. She was replaced by Rika Hongo.

=== Junior qualifiers ===
No.	Men	Ladies	Pairs	Ice dance
1	(China) Jin Boyang	(Russia) Serafima Sakhanovich	(Canada) Julianne Séguin / Charlie Bilodeau	(Russia) Anna Yanovskaya / Sergey Mozgov
2	(Japan) Shoma Uno	(Russia) Evgenia Medvedeva	(Russia) Maria Vigalova / Egor Zakroev	(Russia) Betina Popova / Yuri Vlasenko
3	(Russia) Alexander Petrov	(Japan) Wakaba Higuchi	(Russia) Lina Fedorova / Maxim Miroshkin	(Canada) Mackenzie Bent / Garrett MacKeen
4	(South Korea) Lee June-hyoung	(Russia) Maria Sotskova	(Russia) Kamilla Gainetdinova / Sergei Alexeev	(Russia) Alla Loboda / Pavel Drozd
5	(Japan) Sota Yamamoto	(Japan) Yuka Nagai	(Russia) Daria Beklemisheva / Maxim Bobrov	(Canada) Madeline Edwards / Zhao Kai Pang
6	(Canada) Roman Sadovsky	(Japan) Miyu Nakashio	(United States) Chelsea Liu / Brian Johnson	(Russia) Daria Morozova / Mikhail Zhirnov

Alternates

No.	Men	Women	Pairs	Ice dance
1	(China) Zhang He	(United States) Karen Chen	(Russia) Anastasia A. Gubanova / Alexei Sintsov	(United States) Rachel Parsons / Michael Parsons
2	(Russia) Alexander Samarin	(Kazakhstan) Elizabet Tursynbayeva	(Ukraine) Renata Oganesian / Mark Bardei	(United States) Lorraine McNamara / Quinn Carpenter
3	(Russia) Dmitri Aliev	(Japan) Rin Nitaya	(Japan) Ami Koga / Francis Boudreau Audet	(Canada) Brianna Delmaestro / Timothy Lum

== Medal summary ==
=== Senior medalists ===
Discipline	Gold	Silver	Bronze
Men	(Japan) Yuzuru Hanyu	(Spain) Javier Fernández	(Russia) Sergei Voronov
Ladies	(Russia) Elizaveta Tuktamysheva	(Russia) Elena Radionova	(United States) Ashley Wagner
Pairs	(Canada) Meagan Duhamel / Eric Radford	(Russia) Ksenia Stolbova / Fedor Klimov	(China) Sui Wenjing / Han Cong
Ice dance	(Canada) Kaitlyn Weaver / Andrew Poje	(United States) Madison Chock / Evan Bates	(France) Gabriella Papadakis / Guillaume Cizeron

=== Junior medalists ===
Discipline	Gold	Silver	Bronze
Men	(Japan) Shoma Uno	(Japan) Sota Yamamoto	(Russia) Alexander Petrov
Ladies	(Russia) Evgenia Medvedeva	(Russia) Serafima Sakhanovich	(Japan) Wakaba Higuchi
Pairs	(Canada) Julianne Séguin / Charlie Bilodeau	(Russia) Lina Fedorova / Maxim Miroshkin	(Russia) Maria Vigalova / Egor Zakroev
Ice dance	(Russia) Anna Yanovskaya / Sergey Mozgov	(Russia) Alla Loboda / Pavel Drozd	(Russia) Betina Popova / Yuri Vlasenko

== Medals table ==
=== Senior ===
Rank	Nation	Gold	Silver	Bronze	Total
1	Canada (CAN)	2	0	0	2
2	Russia (RUS)	1	2	1	4
3	Japan (JPN)	1	0	0	1
4	United States (USA)	0	1	1	2
5	Spain (ESP)	0	1	0	1
6	China (CHN)	0	0	1	1
6	France (FRA)	0	0	1	1
Totals (7 entries)		4	4	4	12

=== Junior ===
Rank	Nation	Gold	Silver	Bronze	Total
1	Russia (RUS)	2	3	3	8
2	Japan (JPN)	1	1	1	3
3	Canada (CAN)	1	0	0	1
Totals (3 entries)		4	4	4	12

== Senior-level results ==
=== Men ===
Rank	Name	Nation	Total points	SP		FS	
1	Yuzuru Hanyu	Japan	288.16	1	94.08	1	194.08
2	Javier Fernández	Spain	253.90	5	79.18	2	174.72
3	Sergei Voronov	Russia	244.53	4	84.48	3	160.05
4	Maxim Kovtun	Russia	242.27	3	87.02	5	155.25
5	Takahito Mura	Japan	235.37	6	78.35	4	157.02
6	Tatsuki Machida	Japan	216.13	2	87.82	6	128.31

=== Ladies ===
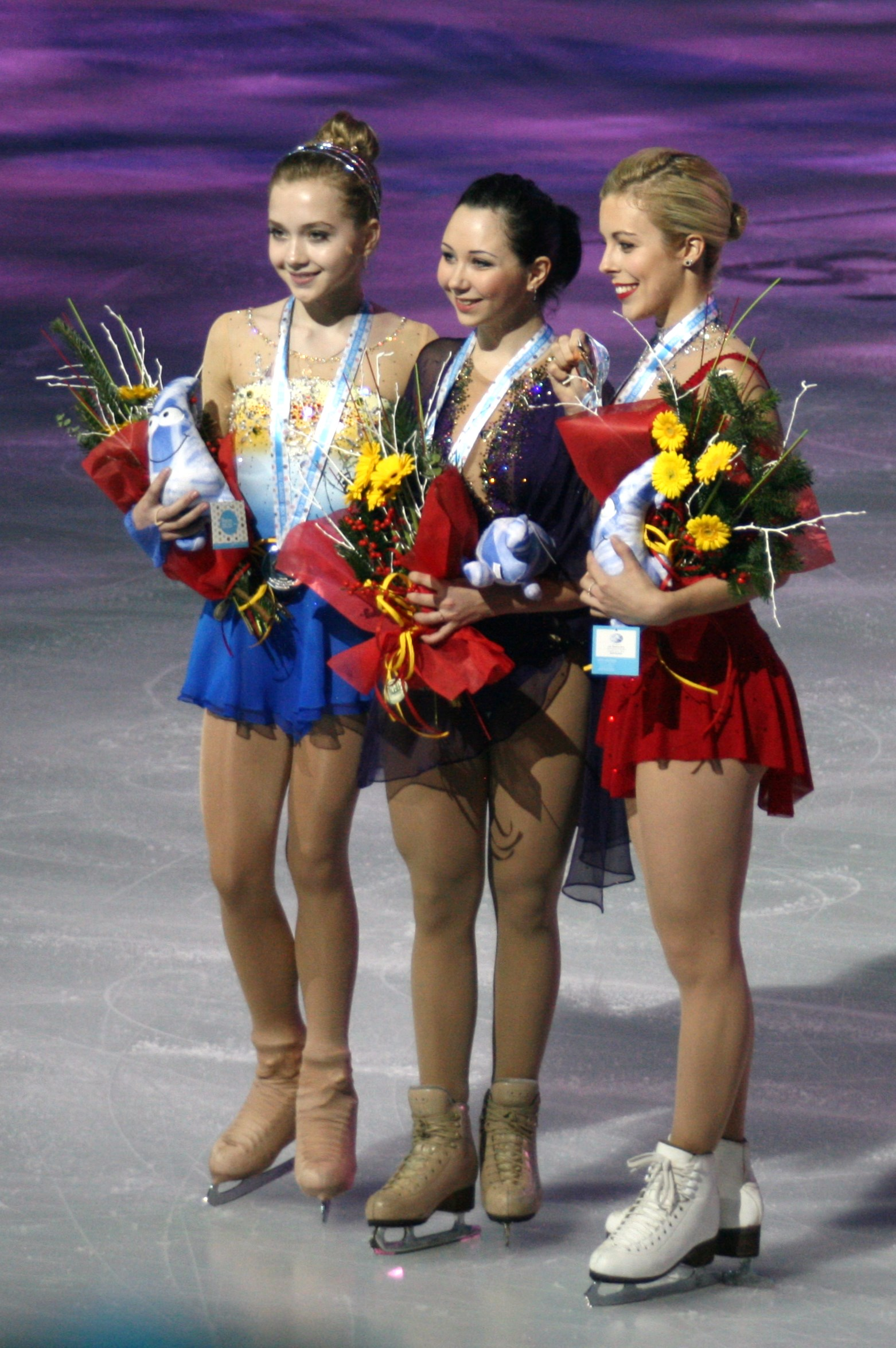
From left to right: Elena Radionova (2nd), Elizaveta Tuktamysheva (1st), and Ashley Wagner (3rd).

Rank	Name	Nation	Total points	SP		FS	
1	Elizaveta Tuktamysheva	Russia	203.58	1	67.52	1	136.06
2	Elena Radionova	Russia	198.74	3	63.89	2	134.85
3	Ashley Wagner	United States	189.50	6	60.24	3	129.26
4	Anna Pogorilaya	Russia	180.29	4	61.34	4	118.95
5	Yulia Lipnitskaya	Russia	177.79	2	66.24	6	111.55
6	Rika Hongo	Japan	176.13	5	61.10	5	115.03

=== Pairs ===
Rank	Name	Nation	Total points	SP		FS	
1	Meagan Duhamel / Eric Radford	Canada	220.72	1	74.50	1	146.22
2	Ksenia Stolbova / Fedor Klimov	Russia	213.72	2	72.33	2	141.39
3	Sui Wenjing / Han Cong	China	194.31	3	66.66	5	127.65
4	Peng Cheng / Zhang Hao	China	191.79	5	62.46	3	129.33
5	Yu Xiaoyu / Jin Yang	China	187.79	4	62.71	6	125.08
6	Yuko Kavaguti / Alexander Smirnov	Russia	184.54	6	55.97	4	128.57

=== Ice dancing ===
Rank	Name	Nation	Total points	SD		FD	
1	Kaitlyn Weaver / Andrew Poje	Canada	181.14	1	71.34	1	109.80
2	Madison Chock / Evan Bates	United States	167.09	2	65.06	2	102.03
3	Gabriella Papadakis / Guillaume Cizeron	France	162.39	5	61.48	3	100.91
4	Maia Shibutani / Alex Shibutani	United States	158.94	3	63.90	6	95.04
5	Piper Gilles / Paul Poirier	Canada	158.16	4	62.49	5	95.67
6	Elena Ilinykh / Ruslan Zhiganshin	Russia	156.46	6	60.25	4	96.21

== Junior-level results ==
=== Men ===
Rank	Name	Nation	Total points	SP		FS	
1	Shoma Uno	Japan	238.27	3	75.21	1	163.06
2	Sota Yamamoto	Japan	213.12	1	76.14	3	136.98
3	Alexander Petrov	Russia	207.14	4	70.07	2	137.07
4	Jin Boyang	China	201.02	2	75.30	5	125.72
5	Roman Sadovsky	Canada	185.47	6	56.98	4	128.49
6	Lee June-hyoung	South Korea	180.39	5	57.42	6	122.97

=== Ladies ===
Rank	Name	Nation	Total points	SP		FS	
1	Evgenia Medvedeva	Russia	190.89	1	67.09	1	123.80
2	Serafima Sakhanovich	Russia	186.01	2	66.05	2	119.96
3	Wakaba Higuchi	Japan	178.09	5	60.37	3	117.72
4	Maria Sotskova	Russia	175.99	4	62.28	4	113.71
5	Yuka Nagai	Japan	172.34	3	62.99	5	109.35
6	Miyu Nakashio	Japan	144.44	6	51.74	6	92.70

=== Pairs ===
Rank	Name	Nation	Total points	SP		FS	
1	Julianne Séguin / Charlie Bilodeau	Canada	175.57	1	59.22	1	116.35
2	Lina Fedorova / Maxim Miroshkin	Russia	165.78	2	59.04	2	106.74
3	Maria Vigalova / Egor Zakroev	Russia	161.75	3	57.41	3	104.34
4	Daria Beklemisheva / Maxim Bobrov	Russia	131.57	4	48.61	6	82.96
5	Kamilla Gainetdinova / Sergei Alexeev	Russia	130.14	5	46.59	5	83.55
6	Chelsea Liu / Brian Johnson	United States	124.86	6	39.05	4	85.81

=== Ice dancing ===
Rank	Name	Nation	Total points	SD		FD	
1	Anna Yanovskaya / Sergey Mozgov	Russia	148.58	1	59.12	1	89.46
2	Alla Loboda / Pavel Drozd	Russia	136.31	2	53.72	2	82.59
3	Betina Popova / Yuri Vlasenko	Russia	131.88	3	50.52	3	81.36
4	Mackenzie Bent / Garrett MacKeen	Canada	128.61	4	49.28	4	79.33
5	Madeline Edwards / Zhao Kai Pang	Canada	122.39	5	47.60	5	74.79
6	Daria Morozova / Mikhail Zhirnov	Russia	113.26	6	46.99	6	66.27
