= Zhao Kai Pang =

Canadian ice dancer

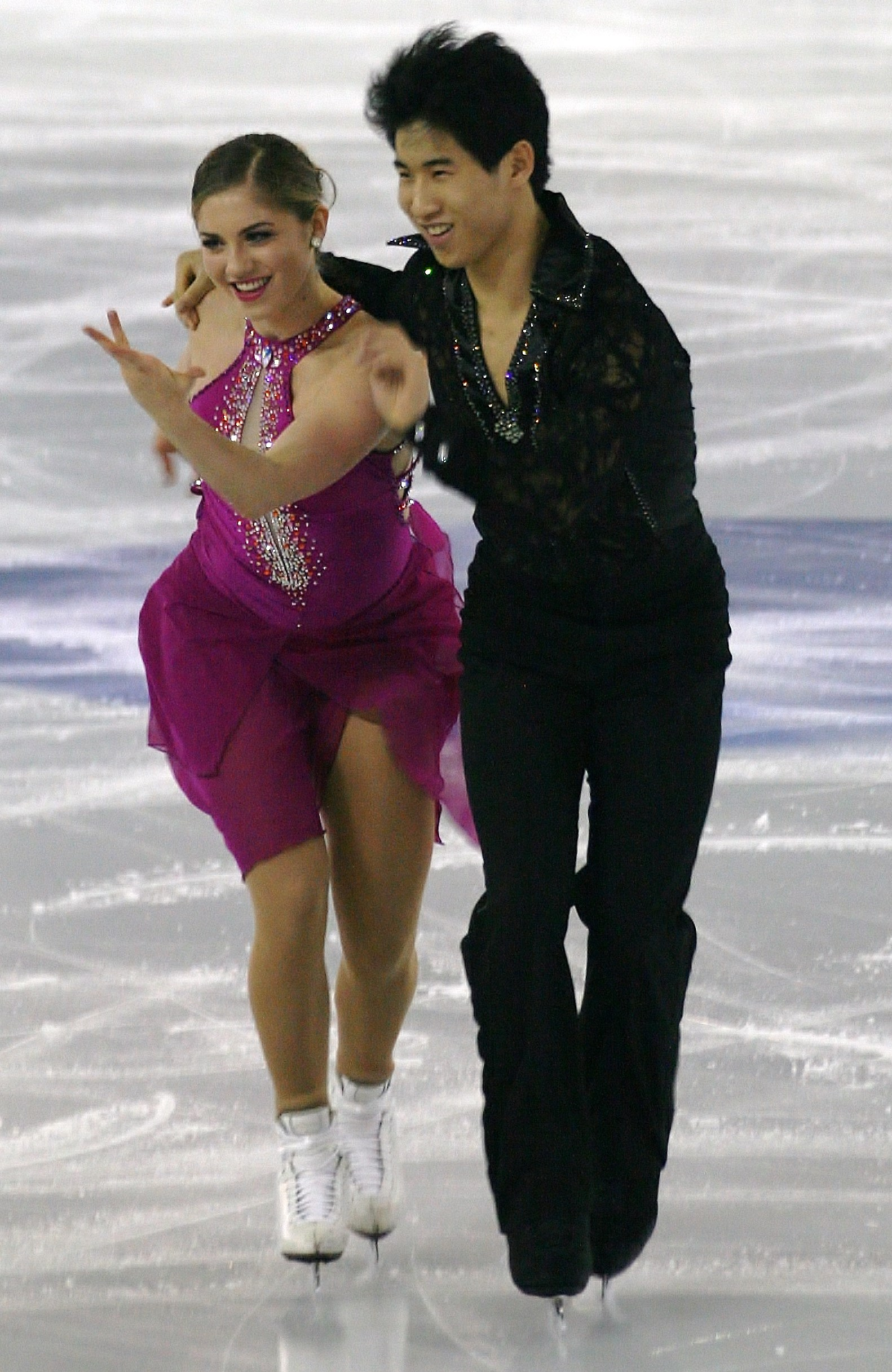
- Edwards/Pang in 2014

Personal information
- Born: March 5, 1995 (age 31) Kitimat, British Columbia
- Home town: Burnaby, British Columbia
- Height: 1.76 m (5 ft 9 1/2 in)

Figure skating career
- Country: Canada
- Partner: Madeline Edwards
- Coach: Megan Wing; Aaron Lowe
- Skating club: Inlet FSC Burnaby
- Began skating: 1998
- Retired: July 13, 2016
Medal record
Representing Canada
Figure skating: Ice dancing
World Junior Championships
Bronze medal – third place	2014 Sofia	Ice dancing

Zhao Kai Pang (born March 5, 1995) is a Canadian former competitive ice dancer. With partner Madeline Edwards, he is the 2014 World Junior bronze medalist and 2013 Canadian national junior champion.

== Career ==
Zhao Kai Pang teamed up with Madeline Edwards in December 2007. They debuted on the ISU Junior Grand Prix series in 2011, placing fifth in Austria. The following season, they won a pair of bronze medals at their JGP assignments, in France and Turkey, and gold in the junior event at the 2013 Canadian Championships. They were sent to the 2013 World Junior Championships, where they finished 12th.

In the 2013–14 season, Edwards/Pang won two JGP medals, silver in Mexico and bronze in the Czech Republic. Because Skate Canada required junior champions to move up, they competed on the senior level domestically, with a different pattern in the short dance and an additional 30 seconds in the free dance. They finished seventh at the 2014 Canadian Championships. At the 2014 World Junior Championships, they won the bronze medal after placing fifth in the short dance and third in the free dance.

Edwards/Pang decided to continue competing on the JGP series in the 2014–15 season. They were awarded silver in Courchevel, France, finishing second to Russia's Alla Loboda / Pavel Drozd by a margin of 2.82 points. After edging Loboda/Drozd by 0.44 to win gold in Aichi, Japan, they qualified for the JGP Final in Barcelona, where they placed fifth. Edwards injured her ankle during training in late December 2014. Ranked sixth in the short and fourth in the free dance, the duo finished sixth at the 2015 World Junior Championships in Tallinn, Estonia.

Edwards/Pang decided to sit out the 2015–16 season to allow her ankle to heal fully. On July 13, 2016, Pang announced his decision to retire from competition.

In 2019, Pang was accepted into the University of British Columbia's Faculty of Medicine.

== Programs ==
(with Edwards)

Season	Short dance	Free dance	Exhibition
2015–16		Misa Tango by Luis Bacalov choreo. by Mark Pillay	
2014–15	Junior-level: Chi Samba by Toni Braxton, Edmundo Ros; Rhumba: Eres todo en me by Ana Gabriel; Chi Samba by Toni Braxton, Edmundo Ros; Senior-level: Paso: Flamenco:	Beautiful That Way; Il Tema Della Tata by Nicola Piovani; Hobson's Choice: Act 3, Finale by Paul Reade	You and I by Ingrid Michaelson
2013–14	Foxtrot: It's De-Lovely; Quickstep: Anything Goes	Les Misérables; Bring Him Home performed by Colm Wilkinson; Master of the House; One Day More	
2012–13	Why Don't You Do Right; Mr. Pinstripe Suit by Big Bad Voodoo Daddy	The Artist by Ludovic Bource; George Valentin; Waltz for Peppy; Peppy and George	
2011–12	Rie Y Lora by Celia Cruz; Mujer Latina by Thalia	Notre-Dame de Paris by Riccardo Cocciante; Les Temps des Cathedrales; Dechiré; Les Oiseaux Qu'on Met en Cage performed by Garou and Hélène Ségara; Les Temps des Cathedrales	
2010–11		The Muppets; Happy Feet	
2009–10		Tango Innominato by Caravan Gypsy Swing Ensemble; Minor Swing (from Chocolat) by Rachel Portman	
2008–09		Cuban Pete by Tito Puente; Mambo Jambo	

== Competitive highlights ==
JGP: Junior Grand Prix

With Edwards

International
Event	10–11	11–12	12–13	13–14	14–15
Junior Worlds			12th	3rd	6th
JGP Final					5th
JGP Austria		5th			
JGP Czech Rep.				3rd	
JGP France			3rd		2nd
JGP Japan					1st
JGP Mexico				2nd	
JGP Turkey			3rd		
National
Canadian Champ.	1st N	2nd J	1st J	7th	7th
Levels – N: Novice, J: Junior
