= Tara Hancherow =

Canadian pair skater

Personal information
- Born: October 30, 1995 (age 30) Saskatoon, Saskatchewan, Canada
- Height: 1.55 m (5 ft 1 in)

Figure skating career
- Country: Canada
- Coach: Annie Barabé, Maximin Coia
- Skating club: Skate Tisdale
- Began skating: 1999

Tara Hancherow (born October 30, 1995) is a Canadian pair skater. With partner Wesley Killing, she placed seventh at the 2014 World Junior Championships.

== Programs ==
(with Killing)

| Season | Short program | Free skating |
|---|---|---|
| 2013–2014 | Historia de un Amor performed by Pérez Prado | Méditation (from Thaïs) by Jules Massenet |

== Competitive highlights ==
=== With Killing ===
International
| Event | 2013–14 |
|---|---|
| World Junior Championships | 7th |
| JGP Estonia | 6th |
| JGP Slovakia | 5th |
National
| Canadian Championships | 7th J. |
J. = Junior level; JGP = Junior Grand Prix

=== With Wolfe ===
National
| Event | 2010 | 2011 |
|---|---|---|
| Canadian Championships | 2nd J. | 2nd J. |
J. = Junior level

=== With Poulin ===
National
| Event | 2007 |
|---|---|
| Canadian Championships | 1st Jv. |
Jv. = Juvenile level
