= 2014 World Junior Figure Skating Championships =

- Type: ISU Championship
- Date: March 10 – 16
- Season: 2013–14
- Location: Sofia, Bulgaria
- Host: Bulgarian Skating Federation
- Venue: Winter Sports Hall

Champions
- Men's singles: (Canada) Nam Nguyen
- Ladies' singles: (Russia) Elena Radionova
- Pairs: (China) Yu Xiaoyu / Jin Yang
- Ice dance: (United States) Kaitlin Hawayek / Jean-Luc Baker
- Previous: 2013 World Junior Championships
- Next: 2015 World Junior Championships

The 2014 World Junior Figure Skating Championships was an international figure skating competition in the 2013–14 season. Commonly called "World Juniors" and "Junior Worlds", the event determined the World Junior champions in the disciplines of men's singles, ladies' singles, pair skating, and ice dancing. It was held in Sofia, Bulgaria.

== Records ==
The following new junior records were set during this competition:

Event	Component	Skater(s)	Score	Date	Ref
Pairs	Short program	(China) Yu Xiaoyu / Jin Yang	62.58	12 March 2014	
Ice dancing	Short dance	(United States) Kaitlin Hawayek / Jean-Luc Baker	66.73	12 March 2014	
Ice dancing	Free dance	(Russia) Anna Yanovskaya / Sergey Mozgov	91.36	14 March 2014	
Ice dancing	Total score	(Russia) Anna Yanovskaya / Sergey Mozgov	155.16	14 March 2014	
Ice dancing	Total score	(United States) Kaitlin Hawayek / Jean-Luc Baker	157.12	14 March 2014	
Ladies	Short program	(Russia) Elena Radionova	66.90	15 March 2014	
Ladies	Free skating	(Russia) Elena Radionova	127.39	16 March 2014	
Ladies	Total score	(Russia) Elena Radionova	194.29	16 March 2014	

== Qualification ==
Skaters from all ISU member nations were eligible for the competition if they were at least 13 years old but not 19—or 21 for male pair skaters and ice dancers—before 1 July 2013 in their place of birth. National associations select their entries according to their own criteria but the ISU mandates that their selections achieve a minimum technical elements score (TES) at an international event prior to the World Junior Championships.

The term "Junior" in ISU competition refers to age, not skill level. Skaters may remain age-eligible for Junior Worlds even after competing nationally and internationally at the senior level. At junior events, the ISU requires that all programs conform to junior-specific rules regarding program length, jumping passes, types of elements, etc.

=== Minimum TES ===
Minimum technical scores (TES)
Discipline	Short	Free
Men	20	40
Ladies	20	35
Pairs	20	30
Ice dancing	18	28
Must be achieved at an ISU-recognized international event in the ongoing or preceding season. SP and FS scores may be attained at different events.

=== Number of entries per discipline ===
Based on the results of the 2013 World Junior Championships, the ISU allowed each country one to three entries per discipline.

Spots	Men	Ladies	Pairs	Dance
3	China; United States	Russia; United States	Canada; Russia; United States	Russia; United States
2	Canada; Japan; Philippines; Russia	Canada; Germany; Japan; South Korea	China; Germany	Canada; France; Germany; Uzbekistan
If not listed above, one entry is allowed.

== Entries ==
Member nations selected the following entries:

Country	Men	Ladies	Pairs	Ice dancing
Armenia	Slavik Hayrapetyan	Anastasia Galustyan		
Australia	Brendan Kerry	Kailani Craine	Eliza Smyth / Jordan Dodds	
Austria	Albert Mück	Lara Roth		Christine Smith / Simon Eisenbauer
Azerbaijan	Larry Loupolover			
Belarus	Pavel Ignatenko	Daria Batura		Viktoria Kavaliova / Yurii Bieliaiev
Bulgaria	Ivo Gatovski	Anna Afonkina		Slavyana Tsenova / Egor Zaytsev
Canada	Nam Nguyen; Roman Sadovsky	Alaine Chartrand; Larkyn Austman	Tara Hancherow / Wesley Killing; Mary Orr / Phelan Simpson	Mackenzie Bent / Garrett MacKeen; Madeline Edwards / Zhao Kai Pang
China	Jin Boyang; Zang Wenbo; Zhang He	Zhao Ziquan	Yu Xiaoyu / Jin Yang	Zhao Yue / Liu Chang
Chinese Taipei	Chih-I Tsao	Melanie Yuung-Hui Chang		
Croatia		Valentina Mikac		
Czech Republic	Petr Coufal	Anna Dušková	Anna Dušková / Martin Bidař	Cortney Mansour / Michal Češka
Denmark		Pernille Sørensen		Sarah Vadskjaer Grapek / Malcolm Jones
Estonia	Daniil Zurav	Gerli Liinamäe		Marina Elias / Denis Koreline
Finland	Juho Pirinen	Jenni Saarinen		
France	Simon Hocquaux	Anaïs Ventard		Angélique Abachkina / Louis Thauron; Estelle Elizabeth / Romain Le Gac
Georgia	Armen Agaian			
Germany	Alexander Bjelde	Lutricia Bock; Maria-Katharina Herceg	Julia Linckh / Konrad Hocker-Scholler	Florence Clarke / Tim Dieck; Ria Schiffner / Julian Salatzki
(United Kingdom) Great Britain	Graham Newberry	Emily Hayward		Olivia Smart / Joseph Buckland
Greece				Carina Glastris / Nicholas Lettner
Hong Kong		Maisy Hiu Ching Ma	Marin Ono / Hon Lam To	
Hungary	Alexander Borovoj	Ivett Tóth		Carolina Moscheni / Ádám Lukács
Israel	Daniel Samohin	Netta Schreiber		Kimberly Berkovich / Ronald Zilberberg
Italy	Matteo Rizzo	Guia Maria Tagliapietra	Alessandra Cernuschi / Filippo Ambrosini	Sara Ghislandi / Giona Terzo Ortenzi
Japan	Keiji Tanaka; Shoma Uno	Rika Hongo; Satoko Miyahara	Sumire Suto / Konstantin Chizhikov	
Kazakhstan		Elizabet Tursynbayeva		
Latvia	Deniss Vasiļjevs	Angelina Kučvaļska	Jekaterina Pribilova / Jegors Ņikita Admiralovs	
Lithuania	Arturas Ganzela	Deimantė Kizalaitė		
Malaysia	Julian Zhi Jie Yee			
Netherlands	Thomas Kennes	Niki Wories		
Norway	Sondre Oddvoll Boe			
Philippines		Alisson Krystle Perticheto		
Poland	Krzysztof Gała	Agata Kryger		Beatrice Tomczak / Damian Binkowski
Romania	Daniel Patriche	Julia Sauter		
Russia	Adian Pitkeev; Alexander Petrov	Serafima Sakhanovich; Elena Radionova; Evgenia Medvedeva	Evgenia Tarasova / Vladimir Morozov; Maria Vigalova / Egor Zakroev; Vasilisa Davankova / Andrei Deputat	Anna Yanovskaya / Sergey Mozgov; Betina Popova / Yuri Vlasenko; Evgenia Kosigina / Nikolai Moroshkin
Slovakia	Marco Klepoch	Bronislava Dobiášová		
Slovenia		Pina Umek		
South Africa	Ancio Van Tonder	Michaela Du Toit		
South Korea	Lee June-hyoung	Choi Da-bin; Kim Na-hyun		Rebeka Kim / Kirill Minov
Spain	Victor Bustamante	Elena Mangas		
Sweden	Illya Solomin	Matilda Algotsson		
Switzerland	Carlo Röthlisberger	Matilde Gianocca		
Thailand		Thita Lamsam		
Turkey	Burak Demirboğa	Selin Hafızoğlu		Çağla Demirsal / Berk Akalın
Ukraine	Ivan Pavlov	Anna Khnychenkova		Oleksandra Nazarova / Maxim Nikitin
United States	Nathan Chen; Jordan Moeller; Shotaro Omori	Karen Chen; Amber Glenn; Tyler Pierce	Madeline Aaron / Max Settlage; Kaitlin Budd / Nikita Cheban; Aya Takai / Brian Johnson	Kaitlin Hawayek / Jean-Luc Baker; Lorraine McNamara / Quinn Carpenter; Rachel Parsons / Michael Parsons

Switzerland replaced Nicola Todeschini with Carlo Röthlisberger and Belarus replaced Janina Makeenka with Daria Batura. On 5 March 2014, U.S. Figure Skating stated that the American pair of Chelsea Liu / Devin Perini had withdrawn due to injury and would be replaced by Aya Takai / Brian Johnson. On 6 March 2014, the Russian federation announced that Elena Radionova, having recovered from injury, would replace the lower-ranked Alexandra Proklova, and Evgenia Kosigina / Nikolai Moroshkin would take the place of Alexandra Stepanova / Ivan Bukin, who withdrew due to illness. On 7 March, Canada named Larkyn Austman to replace Julianne Séguin in singles but their third pairs' spot was left unfilled after the withdrawal of Séguin and Charlie Bilodeau. Russia's Maria Sotskova withdrew due to injury and was replaced by Evgenia Medvedeva.

== Schedule ==
Day	Date	Start	Finish	Discipline	Event
Day 1	Wednesday 12 March	13:00	17:15	Ice dancing	Short dance
Day 1	Wednesday 12 March	18:30	19:00		Opening ceremony
Day 1	Wednesday 12 March	19:15	22:15	Pairs	Short program
Day 2	Thursday 13 March	11:30	18:00	Men	Short program
Day 2	Thursday 13 March	19:15	22:05	Pairs	Free skating
Day 2	Thursday 13 March	22:05		Pairs	Victory ceremony
Day 3	Friday 14 March	11:00	18:15	Ladies	Short program
Day 3	Friday 14 March	19:00	22:10	Ice dancing	Free dance
Day 3	Friday 14 March	22:10		Ice dancing	Victory ceremony
Day 4	Saturday 15 March	13:00	16:55	Men	Free skating
Day 4	Saturday 15 March	16:55		Men	Victory ceremony
Day 5	Sunday 16 March	11:00	14:45	Ladies	Free skating
Day 5	Sunday 16 March	14:45		Ladies	Victory ceremony
Day 5	Sunday 16 March	16:00	18:00		Exhibition gala
Updated: 27 February 2014. All times are Eastern European Time (UTC+2).

== Overview ==
Kaitlin Hawayek / Jean-Luc Baker of the United States finished first in the short dance by a margin of 2.93 points over Russia's Anna Yanovskaya / Sergey Mozgov, the 2013 JGP Final champions, while another American team, Lorraine McNamara / Quinn Carpenter, placed third. Yanovskaya/Mozgov narrowly came in first in the free dance but it was not enough to continue Russian ice dancers' four-year streak of gold medals at the World Junior Championships. Hawayek/Baker became the first American ice dancers to win the title since 2009. Rising from fifth after the short dance, Canada's Madeline Edwards / Zhao Kai Pang took the bronze medal ahead of McNamara/Carpenter who finished fourth.

The pairs' short program saw 2012 World Junior silver medalists, Yu Xiaoyu / Jin Yang of China, take a lead of 3.12 points over Russia's Evgenia Tarasova / Vladimir Morozov, who were trailed closely by Vasilisa Davankova / Andrei Deputat, the 2012 bronze medalists. In the free skating, Yu/Jin were again ranked first, this time by 2.45 points, and won the gold medal by a total margin of 5.57 points. Tarasova/Morozov took the silver medal while another Russian pair, Maria Vigalova / Egor Zakroev, edged past Davankova/Deputat to take the bronze medal.

Canada's Nam Nguyen won the men's short program by a margin of 1.36 over China's Jin Boyang. Several skaters, led by Japan's Shoma Uno and Keiji Tanaka, trailed closely behind. In the free skating, Nguyen narrowly outscored Russia's Adian Pitkeev (by 0.44) and American Nathan Chen (by 1.81). The gold medal was awarded to Nguyen, silver to Pitkeev (4.55 point deficit in the combined score), and bronze to Chen (0.52 of a point behind Pitkeev).

2013 World Junior champion Elena Radionova won the ladies' short program, outscoring teammates Serafima Sakhanovich by a margin of 2.15 and Evgenia Medvedeva by 3.18. Ten points ahead of her nearest rival in the free skating and 12.16 overall, Radionova became the first ladies' single skater to repeat as World Junior champion. Sakhanovich won the silver medal, finishing a total of 3.7 points ahead of Medvedeva, who took the bronze medal. It was the second year in a row that Russia swept the ladies' podium at the World Junior Championships. Japan's Satoko Miyahara finished fourth, less than a point behind Medvedeva.

== Results ==
=== Men ===
Rank	Name	Nation	Total points	SP		FS	
1	Nam Nguyen	Canada	217.06	1	72.87	1	144.19
2	Adian Pitkeev	Russia	212.51	7	68.76	2	143.75
3	Nathan Chen	United States	212.03	6	69.65	3	142.38
4	Alexander Petrov	Russia	210.03	5	69.72	4	140.31
5	Shoma Uno	Japan	206.50	3	70.67	5	135.83
6	Jin Boyang	China	203.64	2	71.51	6	132.13
7	Keiji Tanaka	Japan	192.76	4	70.57	8	122.19
8	Deniss Vasiļjevs	Latvia	189.33	11	62.50	7	126.83
9	Jordan Moeller	United States	188.14	9	66.38	9	121.76
10	Petr Coufal	Czech Republic	182.28	10	63.92	11	118.36
11	Zhang He	China	180.35	8	67.72	13	112.63
12	Daniel Samohin	Israel	179.48	17	58.84	10	120.64
13	Roman Sadovsky	Canada	178.44	14	60.79	12	117.65
14	Simon Hocquaux	France	173.95	13	62.01	14	111.94
15	Ivan Pavlov	Ukraine	171.04	16	59.39	16	111.65
16	Lee June-hyoung	South Korea	170.00	18	58.11	15	111.89
17	Zang Wenbo	China	163.20	20	57.77	18	105.43
18	Chih-I Tsao	Chinese Taipei	162.88	15	59.83	19	103.05
19	Graham Newberry	(United Kingdom) Great Britain	162.37	21	55.17	17	107.20
20	Pavel Ignatenko	Belarus	160.92	12	62.18	21	98.74
21	Brendan Kerry	Australia	156.96	19	58.10	20	98.86
22	Illya Solomin	Sweden	147.62	23	53.87	22	93.75
23	Victor Bustamante	Spain	142.99	24	53.74	23	89.25
24	Sondre Oddvoll Boe	Norway	135.89	22	54.31	24	81.58
Did not advance to free skating
25	Alexander Bjelde	Germany		25	51.81		
26	Shotaro Omori	United States		26	51.81		
27	Marco Klepoch	Slovakia		27	49.45		
28	Carlo Röthlisberger	Switzerland		28	47.87		
29	Slavik Hayrapetyan	Armenia		29	47.53		
30	Matteo Rizzo	Italy		30	46.65		
31	Armen Agaian	Georgia		31	46.22		
32	Thomas Kennes	Netherlands		32	46.09		
33	Juho Pirinen	Finland		33	45.11		
34	Ivo Gatovski	Bulgaria		34	45.08		
35	Julian Zhi Jie Yee	Malaysia		35	42.02		
36	Daniil Zurav	Estonia		36	40.84		
37	Krzysztof Gała	Poland		37	39.34		
38	Larry Loupolover	Azerbaijan		38	35.98		

=== Ladies ===
Rank	Name	Nation	Total points	SP		FS	
1	Elena Radionova	Russia	194.29	1	66.90	1	127.39
2	Serafima Sakhanovich	Russia	182.13	2	64.75	2	117.38
3	Evgenia Medvedeva	Russia	178.43	3	63.72	3	114.71
4	Satoko Miyahara	Japan	177.69	4	63.47	4	114.12
5	Alaine Chartrand	Canada	164.35	7	54.68	5	109.67
6	Choi Da-bin	South Korea	162.35	9	53.69	6	108.66
7	Amber Glenn	United States	158.88	5	56.58	8	102.30
8	Rika Hongo	Japan	157.88	11	51.47	7	106.41
9	Karen Chen	United States	155.83	6	56.09	9	99.74
10	Kim Na-hyun	South Korea	144.21	14	47.79	10	96.42
11	Elizabet Tursynbayeva	Kazakhstan	141.72	16	45.62	11	96.10
12	Lutricia Bock	Germany	141.53	12	51.09	12	90.44
13	Jenni Saarinen	Finland	141.02	8	53.76	13	87.26
14	Tyler Pierce	United States	138.58	10	51.84	14	86.74
15	Anaïs Ventard	France	129.66	17	45.00	15	84.66
16	Larkyn Austman	Canada	125.80	18	44.87	16	80.93
17	Anna Khnychenkova	Ukraine	123.95	15	46.62	18	77.33
18	Pernille Sørensen	Denmark	119.90	23	42.24	17	77.66
19	Angelīna Kučvaļska	Latvia	113.14	20	42.77	20	70.37
20	Gerli Liinamäe	Estonia	113.09	21	42.65	19	70.44
21	Matilde Gianocca	Switzerland	111.65	19	43.54	21	68.11
22	Deimantė Kizalaitė	Lithuania	106.32	24	42.05	22	64.27
23	Bronislava Dobiášová	Slovakia	105.72	22	42.35	23	63.37
WD	Maria-Katharina Herceg	Germany		13	48.28		
Did not advance to free skating
25	Zhao Ziquan	China		25	41.62		
26	Netta Schreiber	Israel		26	41.25		
27	Anastasia Galustyan	Armenia		27	41.12		
28	Matilda Algotsson	Sweden		28	39.85		
29	Lara Roth	Austria		29	39.82		
30	Guia Maria Tagliapietra	Italy		30	39.21		
31	Ivett Tóth	Hungary		31	38.85		
32	Anna Dušková	Czech Republic		32	38.49		
33	Agata Kryger	Poland		33	38.34		
34	Julia Sauter	Romania		34	36.87		
35	Kailani Craine	Australia		35	36.67		
36	Maisy Hiu Ching Ma	Hong Kong		36	36.45		
37	Michaela Du Toit	South Africa		37	35.48		
38	Thita Lamsam	Thailand		38	34.81		
39	Selin Hafızoğlu	Turkey		39	34.19		
40	Pina Umek	Slovenia		40	34.08		
41	Daria Batura	Belarus		41	34.06		
WD	Alisson Krystle Perticheto	Philippines					

=== Pairs ===
Rank	Name	Nation	Total points	SP		FS	
1	Yu Xiaoyu / Jin Yang	China	173.77	62.58	1	111.19	1
2	Evgenia Tarasova / Vladimir Morozov	Russia	168.20	59.46	2	108.74	2
3	Maria Vigalova / Egor Zakroev	Russia	152.48	55.32	4	97.16	3
4	Vasilisa Davankova / Andrei Deputat	Russia	150.67	58.35	3	92.32	5
5	Madeline Aaron / Max Settlage	United States	144.91	51.95	5	92.96	4
6	Mary Orr / Phelan Simpson	Canada	132.02	45.14	6	86.88	6
7	Tara Hancherow / Wesley Killing	Canada	128.68	42.35	8	86.33	7
8	Alessandra Cernuschi / Filippo Ambrosini	Italy	123.95	44.90	7	79.05	8
9	Kaitlin Budd / Nikita Cheban	United States	117.36	41.74	9	75.62	9
10	Anna Dušková / Martin Bidař	Czech Republic	113.85	41.29	10	72.56	10
11	Aya Takai / Brian Johnson	United States	111.90	40.24	11	71.66	11
12	Sumire Suto / Konstantin Chizhikov	Japan	107.41	39.70	13	67.71	13
13	Julia Linckh / Konrad Hocker-Scholler	Germany	105.07	36.09	14	68.98	12
14	Marin Ono / Hon Lam To	Hong Kong	103.41	40.05	12	63.36	14
15	Ekaterina Pribylova / Jegors Nikita Admiralovs	Latvia	95.04	31.88	15	63.16	15

=== Ice dancing ===
Rank	Name	Nation	Total points	SD		FD	
1	Kaitlin Hawayek / Jean-Luc Baker	United States	157.12	1	66.73	2	90.39
2	Anna Yanovskaya / Sergey Mozgov	Russia	155.16	2	63.80	1	91.36
3	Madeline Edwards / Zhao Kai Pang	Canada	139.65	5	57.92	3	81.73
4	Lorraine McNamara / Quinn Carpenter	United States	138.53	3	58.65	5	79.88
5	Oleksandra Nazarova / Maxim Nikitin	Ukraine	134.65	7	53.47	4	81.18
6	Rebeka Kim / Kirill Minov	South Korea	133.35	6	55.33	7	78.02
7	Betina Popova / Yuri Vlasenko	Russia	132.47	8	53.47	6	79.18
8	Rachel Parsons / Michael Parsons	United States	131.82	4	58.08	8	73.74
9	Evgenia Kosigina / Nikolai Moroshkin	Russia	126.72	10	53.09	9	73.63
10	Olivia Smart / Joseph Buckland	(United Kingdom) Great Britain	121.01	12	49.28	10	71.73
11	Estelle Elizabeth / Romain Le Gac	France	118.07	11	51.44	11	66.63
12	Mackenzie Bent / Garrett MacKeen	Canada	117.81	9	53.21	12	64.60
13	Cortney Mansour / Michal Češka	Czech Republic	112.70	14	48.52	14	64.18
14	Carolina Moscheni / Ádám Lukács	Hungary	111.35	16	47.13	13	64.22
15	Viktoria Kavaliova / Yurii Bieliaiev	Belarus	108.56	15	47.72	16	60.84
16	Ria Schiffner / Julian Salatzki	Germany	108.22	13	49.03	18	59.19
17	Çağla Demirsal / Berk Akalın	Turkey	102.11	18	42.20	17	59.91
18	Angélique Abachkina / Louis Thauron	France	100.68	19	39.11	15	61.57
19	Zhao Yue / Liu Chang	China	99.00	17	42.44	20	56.56
20	Carina Glastris / Nicholas Lettner	Greece	96.48	20	38.45	19	58.03
Did not advance to free dance
21	Kimberly Berkovich / Ronald Zilberberg	Israel		21	37.00		
22	Christine Smith / Simon Eisenbauer	Austria		22	34.78		
23	Beatrice Tomczak / Damian Binkowski	Poland		23	34.18		
24	Slavyana Tsenova / Egor Zaytsev	Bulgaria		24	34.17		
25	Marina Elias / Denis Koreline	Estonia		25	33.94		
26	Sara Ghislandi / Giona Terzo Ortenzi	Italy		26	33.50		
27	Florence Clarke / Tim Dieck	Germany		27	32.56		
28	Sarah Vadskjaer Grapek / Malcolm Jones	Denmark		28	28.41		

== Medals summary ==
=== Medalists ===
Medals for overall placement:

Discipline	Gold	Silver	Bronze
Men	(Canada) Nam Nguyen	(Russia) Adian Pitkeev	(United States) Nathan Chen
Ladies	(Russia) Elena Radionova	(Russia) Serafima Sakhanovich	(Russia) Evgenia Medvedeva
Pairs	(China) Yu Xiaoyu / Jin Yang	(Russia) Evgenia Tarasova / Vladimir Morozov	(Russia) Maria Vigalova / Egor Zakroev
Ice dancing	(United States) Kaitlin Hawayek / Jean-Luc Baker	(Russia) Anna Yanovskaya / Sergey Mozgov	(Canada) Madeline Edwards / Zhao Kai Pang

Small medals for placement in the short segment:

Discipline	Gold	Silver	Bronze
Men	(Canada) Nam Nguyen	(China) Jin Boyang	(Japan) Shoma Uno
Ladies	(Russia) Elena Radionova	(Russia) Serafima Sakhanovich	(Russia) Evgenia Medvedeva
Pairs	(China) Yu Xiaoyu / Jin Yang	(Russia) Evgenia Tarasova / Vladimir Morozov	(Russia) Vasilisa Davankova / Andrei Deputat
Ice dancing	(United States) Kaitlin Hawayek / Jean-Luc Baker	(Russia) Anna Yanovskaya / Sergey Mozgov	(United States) Lorraine McNamara / Quinn Carpenter

Small medals for placement in the free segment:

Discipline	Gold	Silver	Bronze
Men	(Canada) Nam Nguyen	(Russia) Adian Pitkeev	(United States) Nathan Chen
Ladies	(Russia) Elena Radionova	(Russia) Serafima Sakhanovich	(Russia) Evgenia Medvedeva
Pairs	(China) Yu Xiaoyu / Jin Yang	(Russia) Evgenia Tarasova / Vladimir Morozov	(Russia) Maria Vigalova / Egor Zakroev
Ice dancing	(Russia) Anna Yanovskaya / Sergey Mozgov	(United States) Kaitlin Hawayek / Jean-Luc Baker	(Canada) Madeline Edwards / Zhao Kai Pang

=== By country ===
Table of medals for overall placement:

Rank	Nation	Gold	Silver	Bronze	Total
1	Russia (RUS)	1	4	2	7
2	Canada (CAN)	1	0	1	2
2	United States (USA)	1	0	1	2
4	China (CHN)	1	0	0	1
Totals (4 entries)		4	4	4	12
