= Wesley Killing =

Canadian pair skater

Personal information
- Born: January 11, 1993 (age 33) Woodstock, Ontario, Canada
- Height: 1.83 m (6 ft 0 in)

Figure skating career
- Country: Japan
- Partner: Marin Ono
- Coach: Annie Barabé, Maximin Coia
- Skating club: Champions Training centre
- Began skating: 1997

Wesley Killing (born January 11, 1993) is a Canadian pair skater. With partner Tara Hancherow, he placed seventh at the 2014 World Junior Championships.

== Programs ==
(with Ono)

Season	Short program	Free skating
2016–2017	from Masquerade by Aram Khachaturian	from Corteo by Cirque du Soleil
2014–2015	from Interstellar by Hans Zimmer	Lay Me Down by Sam Smith

(with Hancherow)

Season	Short program	Free skating
2013–2014	Historia de un Amor performed by Pérez Prado	Méditation (from Thaïs) by Jules Massenet

== Competitive highlights ==
=== With Ono ===
International
Event	2015–16	2016–17
Asian Open		4th
Toruń Cup	5th	
National
Japan Championships	2nd	3rd

=== With Hancherow ===
International
Event	2013–14
World Junior Championships	7th
JGP Estonia	6th
JGP Slovakia	5th
National
Canadian Championships	7th J.
J. = Junior level; JGP = Junior Grand Prix

=== Earlier partnerships ===
National
Event	2010 (with Whicher)	2011 (with Whicher)	2012 (with Dunley)	2013 (with Mercer)
Canadian Championships	8th N.	5th N.	4th N.	8th J.
Levels: N. = Novice; J. = Junior
