= 2010 Canadian Figure Skating Championships =

Figure skating competition

- Type: National Championship
- Date: January 11 – 17
- Season: 2009–10
- Location: London, Ontario
- Host: Skate Canada
- Venue: John Labatt Centre; Western Fair Sports Centre

Champions
- Men's singles: Patrick Chan
- Ladies' singles: Joannie Rochette
- Pairs: Jessica Dubé / Bryce Davison
- Ice dance: Tessa Virtue / Scott Moir
- Previous: 2009 Canadian Championships
- Next: 2011 Canadian Championships

The 2010 Canadian Figure Skating Championships were held from January 11 to 17, 2010 in London, Ontario. The event determines the national champions of Canada and was organized by Skate Canada, the nation's figure skating governing body. The senior-level events were held at the John Labatt Centre and the junior- and novice-level events were held at the Western Fair Sports Centre. Skaters competed at the senior, junior, and novice levels in the disciplines of men's singles, women's singles, pair skating, and ice dancing. Although the official International Skating Union terminology for female skaters in the singles category is ladies, Skate Canada uses women officially. The results of this competition were used to pick the Canadian teams to the 2010 Winter Olympics, the 2010 World Championships, the 2010 Four Continents Championships, and the 2010 World Junior Championships, as well as the Canadian national team.

The novice event had been held separately in previous years; the last time it was held with the senior events was 1997.

== Schedule ==
All times are Eastern Standard Time (UTC-5).

- Monday, January 11
  - 19:40: Novice Compulsory Dance
- Tuesday, January 12
  - 9:15: Junior Pair Short
  - 11:05: Novice Men Short
  - 13:30: Novice Pair Short
  - 15:25: Junior Compulsory Dance
  - 17:30: Opening Ceremony
  - 17:55: Novice Women Short
  - 20:20: Junior Men Short
- Wednesday, January 13
  - 9:00: Novice Free Dance
  - 11:20: Novice Men Free
  - 14:05: Novice Pair Free
  - 16:10: Junior Original Dance
  - 18:20: Novice Women Free
  - 20:55: Junior Women Short
- Thursday, January 14
  - 9:25: Junior Free Dance
  - 11:45: Junior Men Free
  - 17:00: Novice Gala Exhibition And Opening Ceremonies
  - 17:10: Junior Women Free
  - 18:00: Senior Compulsory Dance
  - 20:00 Junior Pair Free
- Friday, January 15
  - 9:55: Senior Women Short Program
  - 12:55: Senior Pair Short Program
  - 16:55: Senior Original Dance
  - 19:25: Senior Men Short Program
- Saturday, January 16
  - 11:30: Senior Pair Free
  - 15:00: Senior Women Free
  - 19:00: Senior Free Dance
- Sunday, January 17
  - 14:30: Medal Presentations – Senior Pairs, Women, Dance
  - 15:00: Hall Of Fame Special Presentations
  - 16:00: Senior Men Free
  - 19:00: Olympic Team Announcement
  - 19:30: Medal Presentations – Men
  - 20:15: Junior/Senior Exhibition Gala

== Senior results ==
=== Men ===
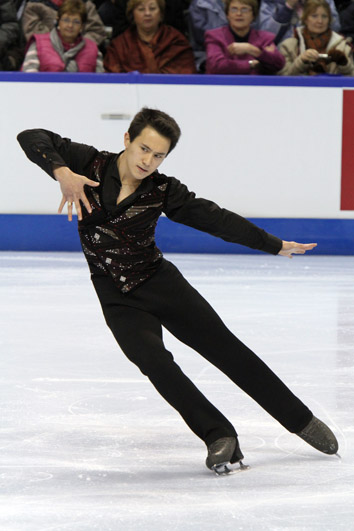
Patrick Chan during the 2010 Canadian Figure Skating Championships

Rank	Name	Section	Total points	SP		FS	
1	Patrick Chan	CO	268.02	1	90.14	1	177.88
2	Vaughn Chipeur	AB/NT/NU	222.10	2	78.87	3	143.23
3	Kevin Reynolds	BC/YT	216.49	5	67.39	2	149.10
4	Shawn Sawyer	QC	210.35	4	72.93	4	137.42
5	Joey Russell	NL	202.16	3	74.04	5	128.12
6	Ian Martinez	QC	184.99	8	60.76	6	124.23
7	Jeremy Ten	BC/YT	172.95	11	53.85	7	119.10
8	Sébastien Wolfe	QC	169.15	9	56.49	8	112.66
9	Ronald Lam	BC/YT	169.13	7	64.61	9	104.52
10	Marc-André Craig	QC	168.48	6	65.32	11	103.16
11	Andrei Rogozine	CO	152.88	14	48.95	10	103.93
12	Louis-Philippe Sirois	QC	148.67	16	46.52	12	102.15
13	Ehren Jaleel	AB/NT/NU	146.62	12	49.81	14	96.81
14	Patrick Wong	BC/YT	144.93	10	54.51	17	90.42
15	Dave Ferland	QC	144.36	17	45.22	13	99.14
16	David Struthers	QC	143.45	13	49.71	16	93.74
17	Andrew Lum	BC/YT	141.72	15	47.89	15	93.83
18	Evan Gammon	WO	121.25	18	39.75	18	81.50

=== Women ===
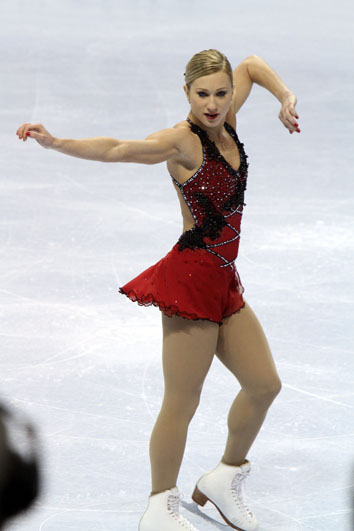
Joannie Rochette during the 2010 Canadian Figure Skating Championships

Rank	Name	Section	Total points	SP		FS	
1	Joannie Rochette	QC	208.23	2	64.15	1	144.08
2	Cynthia Phaneuf	QC	182.55	1	66.30	2	116.25
3	Myriane Samson	QC	151.10	4	53.51	4	97.59
4	Diane Szmiett	WO	148.47	6	48.19	3	100.28
5	Amélie Lacoste	QC	147.43	3	53.99	5	93.44
6	Adriana DeSanctis	CO	140.52	5	48.58	6	91.94
7	Kate Charbonneau	MB	130.93	7	47.90	8	83.03
8	Vanessa Grenier	QC	124.25	11	44.67	9	79.58
9	Rylie McCulloch-Casarsa	WO	119.75	16	34.96	7	84.79
10	Dallas Daniel	AB/NT/NU	119.15	7	47.90	12	71.25
11	Daniela-Bella Favot	WO	117.87	12	40.98	10	76.89
12	Izabel Valiquette	QC	116.25	10	46.21	13	70.04
13	Vanessa Sauriol	QC	115.87	9	46.24	14	69.63
14	Kristy Bell	WO	109.57	13	40.21	15	69.36
15	Alexandra Najarro	CO	109.32	18	32.88	11	76.44
16	Erin Scherrer	WO	104.21	14	40.02	16	64.19
17	McKenzie Crawford	WO	95.65	17	33.90	17	61.75
WD	Mira Leung	BC/YT		15	36.45		

=== Pairs ===
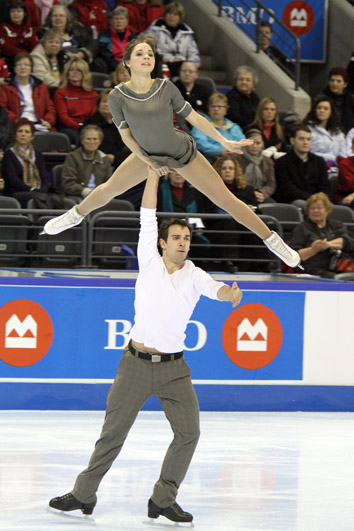
Jessica Dubé and Bryce Davison doing a lift during the 2010 Canadian Figure Skating Championships

Rank	Name	Section	Total points	SP		FS	
1	Jessica Dubé / Bryce Davison	QC	198.27	2	62.87	1	135.40
2	Anabelle Langlois / Cody Hay	QC	183.42	1	65.47	2	117.95
3	Meagan Duhamel / Craig Buntin	QC	172.18	3	62.38	3	109.80
4	Mylène Brodeur / John Mattatall	NS	167.01	4	60.33	4	106.68
5	Kirsten Moore-Towers / Dylan Moscovitch	WO	160.13	6	54.46	5	105.67
6	Paige Lawrence / Rudi Swiegers	SK	157.56	5	58.22	6	99.34
7	Kaleigh Hole / Adam Johnson	WO	143.20	10	46.00	7	97.20
8	Anne-Marie Giroux / Eric Radford	QC	138.26	8	48.75	8	89.51
9	Brittany Jones / Kurtis Gaskell	WO	133.63	7	49.11	9	84.52
10	Monica Pisotta / Michael Stewart	CO	126.17	11	44.79	10	81.38
11	Jade-Savannah Godin / Andrew Evans	QC	126.13	9	46.26	11	79.87
12	Noemie Arseneault / Simon-Pierre Côté	QC	116.18	12	42.35	12	73.83

=== Ice dancing ===
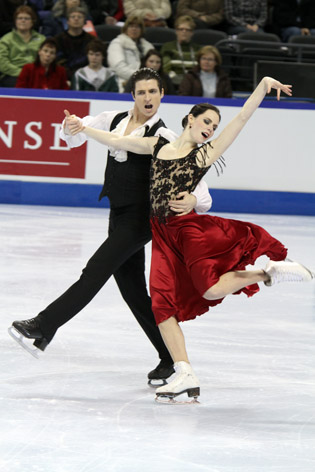
Tessa Virtue and Scott Moir during the 2010 Canadian Figure Skating Championships

Rank	Name	Section	Total points	CD		OD		FD	
1	Tessa Virtue / Scott Moir	WO	221.95	1	43.98	1	70.15	1	107.82
2	Vanessa Crone / Paul Poirier	CO	184.70	2	37.27	3	57.50	2	89.93
3	Kaitlyn Weaver / Andrew Poje	NO	184.40	3	36.87	2	57.92	3	89.61
4	Kharis Ralph / Asher Hill	CO	170.04	9	31.43	4	52.77	4	85.84
5	Allie Hann-McCurdy / Michael Coreno	EO	168.31	5	33.59	5	52.05	6	82.67
6	Tarrah Harvey / Keith Gagnon	BC/YT	166.91	7	33.11	6	49.59	5	84.21
7	Andrea Chong / Guillaume Gfeller	QC	162.58	4	34.11	7	49.43	8	79.04
8	Mylène Girard / Jonathan Pelletier	QC	160.20	6	33.45	9	46.34	7	80.41
9	Karen Routhier / Eric Saucke-Lacelle	QC	156.98	8	32.03	8	49.40	9	75.55
10	Sarah Arnold / Justin Trojek	WO	142.19	12	23.79	10	43.93	10	74.47
11	Megan Wilson / Marcus Connolly	QC	136.27	10	25.73	11	43.36	12	67.18
12	Sophie Knippel / Benjaman Westenberger	CO	134.39	13	23.59	12	41.66	11	69.14
13	Helene Letourneau / Kevin Boczar	EO	125.67	11	24.97	15	36.09	14	64.61
14	Sarah Lysne / Christopher Steeves	AB/NT/NU	124.66	14	23.49	14	36.29	13	64.88
15	Rebecca Fowler / Iliya Koreshev	BC/YT	118.39	15	22.15	13	36.39	15	59.85

== Junior results ==
=== Men ===
Rank	Name	Section	Total points	SP		FS	
1	Liam Firus	BC/YT	159.00	1	55.85	1	103.15
2	Samuel Morais	QC	155.49	2	52.69	2	102.80
3	Nam Nguyen	BC/YT	148.81	4	52.30	3	96.51
4	Shaquille Davis	CO	148.64	3	52.56	4	96.08
5	Garrett Gosselin	SK	138.61	5	50.63	6	87.98
6	Raphael Yacobi-Harris	CO	136.19	7	47.70	5	88.49
7	Ian Beharry	WO	128.62	6	48.04	8	80.58
8	Joel Bond	NO	127.75	12	40.40	7	87.35
9	Rhys Anderson	BC/YT	122.79	9	43.82	10	78.97
10	Charles Dion	QC	122.70	10	43.15	9	79.55
11	Maxime Deschamps	QC	121.30	11	43.09	11	78.21
12	Michael Marinaro	WO	118.69	8	46.38	13	72.31
13	Christopher Boutilier	WO	112.05	14	36.28	12	75.77
14	Sasha Alcoloumbre	QC	102.88	13	37.54	14	65.34
15	Patrick Myzyk	CO	99.69	16	35.52	16	64.17
16	Benjamin Guthrie	NO	97.94	15	35.65	17	62.29
17	Kevin Caron	BC/YT	93.73	17	33.88	18	59.85
18	Nic Van Der Merwe	AB/NT/NU	91.36	18	27.02	15	64.34

=== Women ===
Rank	Name	Section	Total points	SP		FS	
1	Eri Nishimura	CO	115.55	4	42.82	1	72.73
2	Alana Tidy	QC	114.25	2	43.22	3	71.03
3	Kaetlyn Osmond	AB/NT/NU	112.62	5	41.32	2	71.30
4	Roxanne Rheault	QC	109.12	3	42.90	5	66.22
5	Maggie Mackinnon	NB	104.07	7	40.44	7	63.63
6	Andrea Poapst	CO	103.10	12	35.92	4	67.18
7	Kitty Qian	BC/YT	102.97	1	47.02	13	55.95
8	Devon Kippen	AB/NT/NU	101.99	6	41.18	10	60.81
9	Morgan Jmaiff	BC/YT	100.79	13	35.24	6	65.55
10	Ann-Julie Dion	QC	100.03	8	38.74	9	61.29
11	Maude Gagnon	QC	98.12	9	36.74	8	61.38
12	Elizabeth Liao	WO	91.99	15	34.58	12	57.41
13	Laurence Gasse	QC	90.94	16	32.60	11	58.34
14	Anastasia Loginova	CO	89.96	11	35.94	15	54.02
15	Gloria Chong	BC/YT	89.40	10	36.08	16	53.32
16	Ashley Simond	WO	86.70	14	34.70	17	52.00
17	Alexandra Rynn	AB/NT/NU	86.00	17	30.20	14	55.80
18	Christina Pulla	EO	77.10	18	28.44	18	48.66

=== Pairs ===
Rank	Name	Section	Total points	SP		FS	
1	Margaret Purdy / Michael Marinaro	WO	129.59	1	48.80	1	80.79
2	Tara Hancherow / Sébastien Wolfe	QC	115.61	3	41.02	2	74.59
3	Katherine Bobak / Matthew Penasse	WO	112.48	2	43.58	5	68.90
4	Taylor Steele / Robert Schultz	WO	112.21	5	40.02	3	72.19
5	Andrea Tou / Garnet Suidy	WO	108.62	7	36.70	4	71.92
6	Kristen Tikel / Ian Beharry	WO	106.21	4	40.30	6	65.91
7	Sara Jones / Jeremy Sandor	QC	92.55	6	36.84	8	55.71
8	Mariève Cyr / Jean-Marie Dessureault-Yesilada	QC	89.40	9	30.78	7	58.62
9	Marianne Rioux Ouellet / Thomas Potvin	QC	84.84	8	32.10	9	52.74

=== Ice dancing ===
Rank	Name	Section	Total points	CD		OD		FD	
1	Alexandra Paul / Mitchell Islam	CO	169.39	1	34.42	1	55.26	1	79.71
2	Olivia Martins / Alvin Chau	CO	145.22	2	32.23	2	45.93	4	67.06
3	Abby Carswell / Andrew Doleman	WO	143.12	3	28.45	3	44.39	2	70.28
4	Alexa-Marie Arrotta / Martin Nickel	MB	139.80	4	27.76	5	43.76	3	68.28
5	Andréanne Poulin / Marc-André Servant	QC	134.90	5	26.88	4	44.23	5	63.79
6	Veronique de Beaumont-Boisvert / Sebastien Bur	QC	131.08	6	26.29	7	41.17	6	63.62
7	Nicole Orford / Malcolm Rohon-O'Halloran	BC/YT	128.53	8	24.82	6	42.22	8	61.49
8	Jazz Smyl Joly / Ryan Behnia	AB/NT/NU	125.85	7	25.94	10	39.34	9	60.57
9	Olga Lioudvinevitch / Thomas Williams	AB/NT/NU	125.54	9	24.54	13	38.67	7	62.33
10	Mélissande Dumas / Anthony Quintal	QC	123.24	12	23.49	8	40.13	10	59.62
11	Catherine St-Onge / Alexander Browne	QC	118.50	10	24.09	9	39.89	12	54.52
12	Catherine Alarie / Benjamin Brisebois Gaudreau	QC	117.50	14	22.22	11	38.90	11	56.38
13	Marie-Philippe Vincent / François-Xavier Ouelle	QC	116.03	13	23.40	11	38.90	13	53.73
14	Élisabeth Paradis / Tristan Laliberté	QC	113.90	11	23.85	14	37.94	14	52.11
15	Kathryn Leak / David Mackay Perry	EO	96.51	15	20.32	15	31.12	15	45.07
WD	Lisa Casselman / Jonathan W. Arcieri	EO							

== Novice results ==
=== Men ===
Rank	Name	Section	Total points	SP		FS	
1	Jordan Ju	BC/YT	117.35	1	40.17	1	77.18
2	Samuel Angers	QC	99.38	9	31.24	2	68.14
3	Peter O'Brien	EO	98.60	2	37.69	6	60.91
4	Cole Vandervelden	AB/NT/NU	96.03	3	34.87	5	61.16
5	Jack Kermezian	QC	95.89	4	33.81	4	62.08
6	Pollux Yeung	BC/YT	93.69	10	30.79	3	62.90
7	Shane Firus	BC/YT	91.81	5	33.62	8	58.19
8	Edbert Khong	CO	89.83	11	29.70	7	60.13
9	Nicolas Beaudoin	QC	88.37	8	31.40	9	56.97
10	Mathieu Nepton	QC	86.28	7	32.03	12	54.25
11	James Hazelton	NS	84.38	14	28.27	10	56.11
12	Francis Beaulieu	QC	82.87	13	28.48	11	54.39
13	Alistair Sylvester	WO	81.42	17	27.32	13	54.10
14	Iassen Petkov	CO	80.46	12	29.19	14	51.27
15	Gabriel Nadeau	QC	80.33	6	32.22	15	48.11
16	Christophe Belley	QC	75.85	15	28.18	16	47.67
17	Caden Armstrong	CO	72.92	16	27.69	17	45.23
18	Jason Perdue	NO	65.05	18	24.12	18	40.93
WD	Drew Wolfe	AB/NT/NU					

=== Women ===
Rank	Name	Section	Total points	SP		FS	
1	Kimberly Moon-Chong	CO	102.88	1	38.69	2	64.19
2	Natasha Purich	AB/NT/NU	97.30	2	38.67	5	58.63
3	Jane Gray	AB/NT/NU	93.72	13	27.68	1	66.04
4	Rachel Greben	CO	90.37	3	36.48	7	53.89
5	Tianna Brammer	BC/YT	89.70	4	33.07	6	56.63
6	Valérie Bergeron	QC	89.02	10	29.58	3	59.44
7	Ashleigh Parker	BC/YT	86.38	16	27.28	4	59.10
8	Kelsey Wiebe	BC/YT	84.94	7	31.50	8	53.44
9	Marie-Pier Duchesne	QC	83.19	6	31.54	10	51.65
10	Cassandra McDonnell	WO	81.81	8	31.12	12	50.69
11	Mackenzie Haining	WO	81.56	12	29.28	9	52.28
12	Deidre Russell	MB	80.73	9	30.61	13	50.12
13	Alaine Chartrand	EO	80.29	11	29.37	11	50.92
14	Karelle Nadeau	QC	77.98	5	32.23	17	45.75
15	Marie-Eve Comtois	QC	75.12	14	27.65	15	47.47
16	Janet Truong	BC/YT	73.06	17	26.35	16	46.71
17	Elizabeth Comeau	EO	72.50	18	23.42	14	49.08
18	Nicole Boyle	CO	70.88	15	27.30	18	43.58

=== Pairs ===
Rank	Name	Section	Total points	SP		FS	
1	Krystel Desjardins / Charlie Bilodeau	QC	102.87	2	38.39	1	64.48
2	Alexandra Young / Matthew Young	NL	102.68	1	38.76	2	63.92
3	Shalena Rau / Phelan Simpson	WO	98.80	3	36.90	3	61.90
4	Aveline Pearson / Alexander Sheldrick	WO	94.73	5	35.96	4	58.77
5	Mary Orr / Anthony Furiano	WO	94.33	6	35.75	5	58.58
6	Alysson Dugas / Maxime Deschamps	QC	87.36	4	36.42	8	50.94
7	Gabriella DeBono / Christopher Sisca	CO	86.91	8	31.84	6	55.07
8	Claira Whicher / Wesley Killing	WO	82.58	9	30.96	7	51.62
9	Sonia Cheung / Chad Mathieu	NO	74.54	7	32.26	11	42.28
10	Daniella Gritsiouk / Shaquille Davis	CO	72.07	10	28.15	9	43.92
11	Vikky Trinh / Vincent Chan	CO	59.01	12	15.70	10	43.31
12	Casey Beavil / Josiah Early	BC/YT	47.27	11	18.27	12	29.00

=== Ice dancing ===
Rank	Name	Section	Total points	CD		OD		FD	
1	Kelly Oliveira / Jordan Hockley	CO	89.31	1	13.67	1	14.59	2	61.05
2	Edrea Khong / Edbert Khong	CO	88.84	4	12.21	4	13.36	1	63.27
3	Victoria Hasegawa / Connor Hasegawa	QC	85.32	2	13.35	2	13.51	3	58.46
4	Baily Carroll / Peter Gerber	CO	83.66	4	12.21	3	13.49	4	57.96
5	Mireille Poudrier / Benjamin Smyth	QC	78.60	3	12.92	14	10.51	5	55.17
6	Pénélope Mondion / Benoit Gagnon	QC	77.29	8	11.56	9	11.93	6	53.80
7	Laurence Fournier Beaudry / Yoan Breton	QC	77.17	6	11.98	11	11.70	7	53.49
8	Jade Marrow / Allan Stoll	WO	73.33	9	11.28	10	11.82	9	50.23
9	Kylie Knight / Benjamin Mulder	WO	72.57	7	11.67	12	11.45	11	49.45
10	Joanna Salvagna / Christopher Lettner	EO	71.78	14	9.84	6	12.27	10	49.67
11	Victoria Coulthard / Peter Ahluwalia	BC/YT	71.73	15	9.38	15	10.43	8	51.92
12	Josyane Cholette / Simon Proulx-Sénécal	QC	70.42	10	11.21	8	11.94	12	47.27
13	Michaela Botsford / Scott Botsford	WO	67.98	12	10.76	5	12.58	14	44.64
14	Sarah Clarke / Steven Clarke	EO	67.06	11	10.91	13	10.96	13	45.19
15	Elizabeth Kang / Victor Vongsaphay	QC	66.44	13	10.36	7	11.97	15	44.11

== International team selections ==
=== Winter Olympics ===
The Olympic team was announced as follows:

	Men	Ladies	Pairs	Ice dancing
1	Patrick Chan	Joannie Rochette	Jessica Dubé / Bryce Davison	Tessa Virtue / Scott Moir
2	Vaughn Chipeur	Cynthia Phaneuf	Anabelle Langlois / Cody Hay	Vanessa Crone / Paul Poirier
1st alt.				
2nd alt.				
3rd alt.				

=== World Championships ===
The World Championships team was announced as follows:

	Men	Ladies	Pairs	Ice dancing
1	Patrick Chan	Cynthia Phaneuf	Jessica Dubé / Bryce Davison	Tessa Virtue / Scott Moir
2	Kevin Reynolds	Myriane Samson	Anabelle Langlois / Cody Hay	Vanessa Crone / Paul Poirier
1st alt.	Ian Martinez	Amélie Lacoste	Mylène Brodeur / John Mattatall	Kaitlyn Weaver / Andrew Poje
2nd alt.	Joey Russell	Diane Szmiett	Meagan Duhamel / Craig Buntin	Kharis Ralph / Asher Hill
3rd alt.	Shawn Sawyer		Kirsten Moore-Towers / Dylan Moscovitch	Allie Hann-McCurdy / Michael Coreno

=== Four Continents Championships ===
The Four Continents Championships team was announced as follows:

	Men	Ladies	Pairs	Ice dancing
1	Kevin Reynolds	Myriane Samson	Meagan Duhamel / Craig Buntin	Kaitlyn Weaver / Andrew Poje
2	Shawn Sawyer	Diane Szmiett	Mylène Brodeur / John Mattatall	Kharis Ralph / Asher Hill
3	Joey Russell	Amélie Lacoste	Kirsten Moore-Towers / Dylan Moscovitch	Allie Hann-McCurdy / Michael Coreno

=== World Junior Championships ===
	Men	Ladies	Pairs	Ice dancing
1	Ronald Lam	Kate Charbonneau	Kaleigh Hole / Adam Johnson	Abby Carswell / Andrew Doleman
2	Andrei Rogozine		Margaret Purdy / Michael Marinaro	Alexandra Paul / Mitchell Islam
3			Brittany Jones / Kurtis Gaskell	Olivia Nicole Martins / Alvin Chau
1st alt.	Liam Firus	Diane Szmiett	Katherine Bobak / Matthew Penasse	Alexa-Marie Arrotta / Martin Nickel
2nd alt.	Elladj Balde	Vanessa Grenier	Tara Hancherow / Sebastien Wolfe	Veronique De Beaumont-Boisvert / Sebastien Buron
3rd alt.	Samuel Morais	Rylie McCulloch-Casarsa	Taylor Steele / Robert Schultz	Andréanne Poulin / Marc-Andre Servant
