= 2011 Skate Canada International =

- Type: Grand Prix
- Date: October 27 – 30
- Season: 2011–12
- Location: Mississauga, Ontario
- Host: Skate Canada
- Venue: Hershey Centre

Champions
- Men's singles: (Canada) Patrick Chan
- Ladies' singles: (Russia) Elizaveta Tuktamysheva
- Pairs: (Russia) Tatiana Volosozhar / Maxim Trankov
- Ice dance: (Canada) Tessa Virtue / Scott Moir
- Previous: 2010 Skate Canada International
- Next: 2012 Skate Canada International
- Previous Grand Prix: 2011 Skate America
- Next Grand Prix: 2011 Cup of China

The 2011 Skate Canada International was the second event of six in the 2011–12 ISU Grand Prix of Figure Skating, a senior-level international invitational competition series. It was held at the Hershey Centre in Mississauga, Ontario on October 27–30. Medals were awarded in the disciplines of men's singles, ladies' singles, pair skating, and ice dancing. Skaters earned points toward qualifying for the 2011–12 Grand Prix Final.

== Eligibility ==
Skaters who reached the age of 14 by July 1, 2011 were eligible to compete on the senior Grand Prix circuit.

In July 2011, minimum score requirements were added to the Grand Prix series and were set at two-thirds of the top scores at the 2011 World Championships. Prior to competing in a Grand Prix event, skaters were required to earn the following:

Discipline	Minimum
Men	168.60
Ladies	117.48
Pairs	130.71
Ice dancing	111.15

== Entries ==
The entries were as follows. Nathalie Péchalat and Fabian Bourzat withdrew on October 26 due to Bourzat's bronchitis.

Country	Men	Ladies	Pairs	Ice dancing
Belgium	Kevin van der Perren			
Canada	Elladj Baldé; Patrick Chan; Andrei Rogozine	Adriana DeSanctis; Amélie Lacoste; Cynthia Phaneuf	Jessica Dubé / Sébastien Wolfe; Meagan Duhamel / Eric Radford; Paige Lawrence / Rudi Swiegers	Tarrah Harvey / Keith Gagnon; Tessa Virtue / Scott Moir; Kaitlyn Weaver / Andrew Poje
China			Sui Wenjing / Han Cong; Yu Xiaoyu / Jin Yang	
Germany		Sarah Hecken		
Italy				Anna Cappellini / Luca Lanotte
Japan	Daisuke Takahashi	Akiko Suzuki	Narumi Takahashi / Mervin Tran	
Kazakhstan	Denis Ten			
Russia		Alena Leonova; Elizaveta Tuktamysheva	Lubov Iliushechkina / Nodari Maisuradze; Tatiana Volosozhar / Maxim Trankov	Ekaterina Pushkash / Jonathan Guerreiro; Ekaterina Riazanova / Ilia Tkachenko
Spain	Javier Fernández			
Sweden	Alexander Majorov			
United States	Ross Miner; Adam Rippon	Rachael Flatt; Mirai Nagasu; Ashley Wagner		Madison Chock / Evan Bates

== Schedule ==
All times are Eastern Daylight Time (UTC -04:00).

- Thursday, October 27
  - 11:00–16:30 – Practices
- Friday, October 28
  - 08:30–14:00 – Practices
  - 14:05–15:25 – Ladies' short program
  - 15:45–16:55 – Pairs' short program
  - 18:30–19:00 – Welcome ceremonies
  - 19:30–20:50 – Men's short program
  - 21:10–22:20 – Ice dancing short dance
- Saturday, October 29
  - 07:30–13:45 – Practices
  - 14:15–15:50 – Ladies' free skating
  - 16:15–17:35 – Pairs' free skating
  - 17:45 – Medal presentations: Ladies/Pairs
  - 19:10–20:50 – Men's free skating
  - 21:00 – Medal presentation: Men
- Sunday, October 30
  - 09:00–11:25 – Practices
  - 12:30 – Free dance
  - 13:55 – Medal presentation: Ice dancing
  - 15:00–16:50 – Exhibition gala

== Results ==
=== Men ===
Rank	Name	Nation	Total points	SP		FS	
1	Patrick Chan	Canada	253.74	3	83.28	1	170.46
2	Javier Fernández	Spain	250.33	1	84.71	2	165.62
3	Daisuke Takahashi	Japan	237.87	2	84.66	3	153.21
4	Adam Rippon	United States	217.97	4	72.89	4	145.08
5	Denis Ten	Kazakhstan	212.39	5	71.40	6	140.99
6	Ross Miner	United States	202.36	9	60.83	5	141.53
7	Andrei Rogozine	Canada	193.40	6	67.28	7	126.12
8	Kevin van der Perren	Belgium	179.21	8	64.01	8	115.20
9	Alexander Majorov	Sweden	177.84	7	65.14	9	112.70
10	Elladj Baldé	Canada	151.57	10	55.99	10	95.58

=== Ladies ===
Rank	Name	Nation	Total points	SP		FS	
1	Elizaveta Tuktamysheva	Russia	177.38	1	59.57	2	117.81
2	Akiko Suzuki	Japan	172.26	4	52.82	1	119.44
3	Ashley Wagner	United States	165.48	2	54.50	3	110.98
4	Alena Leonova	Russia	152.22	7	49.75	4	102.47
5	Mirai Nagasu	United States	151.72	5	52.73	5	98.99
6	Amélie Lacoste	Canada	146.40	6	50.60	6	95.80
7	Cynthia Phaneuf	Canada	140.70	8	48.70	7	92.00
8	Sarah Hecken	Germany	130.71	10	44.50	8	86.21
9	Adriana DeSanctis	Canada	129.48	9	47.14	9	82.34
10	Rachael Flatt	United States	128.22	3	54.23	10	73.99

=== Pairs ===
Rank	Name	Nation	Total points	SP		FS	
1	Tatiana Volosozhar / Maxim Trankov	Russia	201.38	1	70.42	1	130.96
2	Sui Wenjing / Han Cong	China	180.82	4	59.23	2	121.59
3	Meagan Duhamel / Eric Radford	Canada	174.84	2	62.37	3	112.47
4	Narumi Takahashi / Mervin Tran	Japan	169.41	3	60.60	5	108.81
5	Lubov Iliushechkina / Nodari Maisuradze	Russia	165.17	5	58.14	6	107.03
6	Jessica Dubé / Sébastien Wolfe	Canada	158.44	6	53.23	7	105.21
7	Yu Xiaoyu / Jin Yang	China	158.36	8	49.28	4	109.08
8	Paige Lawrence / Rudi Swiegers	Canada	153.96	7	50.11	8	103.85

=== Ice dancing ===
Rank	Name	Nation	Total points	SD		FD	
1	Tessa Virtue / Scott Moir	Canada	178.34	1	71.61	1	106.73
2	Kaitlyn Weaver / Andrew Poje	Canada	155.99	2	63.31	3	92.68
3	Anna Cappellini / Luca Lanotte	Italy	154.87	3	61.92	2	92.95
4	Madison Chock / Evan Bates	United States	135.10	6	51.24	4	84.67
5	Ekaterina Riazanova / Ilia Tkachenko	Russia	132.36	4	54.94	5	77.42
6	Ekaterina Pushkash / Jonathan Guerreiro	Russia	126.63	5	51.24	6	75.39
7	Tarrah Harvey / Keith Gagnon	Canada	122.80	7	49.65	7	73.15
