= 2011 Canadian Figure Skating Championships =

Figure skating competition

- Type: National Championship
- Date: January 17 – 23
- Season: 2010–11
- Location: Victoria, British Columbia
- Host: Skate Canada
- Venue: Save-On-Foods Memorial Centre

Champions
- Men's singles: Patrick Chan
- Ladies' singles: Cynthia Phaneuf
- Pairs: Kirsten Moore-Towers / Dylan Moscovitch
- Ice dance: Vanessa Crone / Paul Poirier
- Previous: 2010 Canadian Championships
- Next: 2012 Canadian Championships

The 2011 Canadian Figure Skating Championships were held from January 17 to 23, 2011 in Victoria, British Columbia. The event determines the national champions of Canada and is organized by Skate Canada, the nation's figure skating governing body. The junior-level and senior-level events were held at the Save-On-Foods Memorial Centre. Skaters competed at the senior, junior, and novice levels in the disciplines of men's singles, women's singles, pair skating, and ice dancing. Although the official International Skating Union terminology for female skaters in the singles category is ladies, Skate Canada uses women officially. The results of this competition were used to pick the Canadian teams for the 2011 World Championships, the 2011 Four Continents Championships, and the 2011 World Junior Championships, as well as the Canadian national team.

The novice event had been held separately in previous years; the last time it was held with the senior events was 1997.

== Schedule ==
Date	Time/Event
Friday, January 21	13:15 Pairs: Short program 15:50 Ice dancing: Short dance 18:20 Ladies: Short program
Saturday, January 22	12:00 Ladies: Free skating 17:20 Men: Short program 20:50 Pairs: Free skating
Sunday, January 23	12:00 Ice dancing: Free dance 14:45 Men: Free skating 19:20 Exhibition gala

== Senior results ==
=== Men ===
Rank	Name	Section	Total points	SP		FS	
1	Patrick Chan	CO	285.85	1	88.78	1	197.07
2	Shawn Sawyer	QC	229.09	2	77.64	2	151.45
3	Joey Russell	NL	204.02	3	69.41	3	134.61
4	Kevin Reynolds	BC/YT	191.85	5	61.76	4	130.09
5	Elladj Baldé	QC	190.16	4	66.07	6	124.09
6	Liam Firus	BC/YT	185.40	7	60.66	5	124.74
7	Ronald Lam	BC/YT	174.69	10	57.39	7	117.30
8	Ian Martinez	QC	169.38	6	61.40	11	107.98
9	Marc-André Craig	QC	165.82	9	58.09	12	107.73
10	Maxime-Billy Fortin	QC	163.77	12	52.26	10	111.51
11	Dave Ferland	QC	162.18	13	48.97	9	113.21
12	Samuel Morais	QC	160.58	15	47.29	8	113.29
13	Andrei Rogozine	CO	148.93	11	57.29	14	91.64
14	Raphael Yacobi-Harris	CO	138.92	16	43.03	13	95.89
15	Patrick Myzyk	CO	138.68	8	58.34	17	80.34
16	Charles Dion	QC	132.55	14	47.68	15	84.87
17	Andrew Lum	BC/YT	123.71	17	39.52	16	84.19

=== Women ===
Rank	Name	Section	Total points	SP		FS	
1	Cynthia Phaneuf	QC	172.32	1	60.77	1	111.55
2	Myriane Samson	QC	157.82	4	49.75	2	108.07
3	Amélie Lacoste	QC	151.72	3	50.86	3	100.86
4	Alexandra Najarro	CO	145.76	2	52.12	5	95.26
5	Adriana DeSanctis	CO	144.23	6	47.81	4	96.42
6	Jessica Dubé	QC	130.90	5	48.81	8	82.09
7	Vanessa Grenier	QC	129.93	8	44.13	7	85.80
8	Dallas Daniel	AB/NT/NU	129.67	9	38.99	6	90.68
9	Kate Charbonneau	MB	120.50	10	38.61	9	81.89
10	Sarah Jourdain	QC	115.92	7	45.69	13	70.23
11	Devon Neuls	BC/YT	114.93	12	37.92	10	77.01
12	Kelsey McNeil	NB	109.92	16	34.52	11	75.40
13	Rylie McCulloch-Casarsa	WO	107.20	10	38.61	15	68.59
14	Jessica-Amy Sergeant	AB/NT/NU	106.78	14	36.05	12	70.73
15	Izabel Valiquette	QC	104.71	15	35.62	14	69.09
16	Daniela-Bella Favot	WO	99.05	17	33.97	16	65.08
17	Karine Chevrier	QC	97.70	13	36.57	17	61.13
18	Jacqueline Lenuik	BC/YT	89.42	18	33.36	18	56.06

=== Pairs ===
Rank	Name	Section	Total points	SP		FS	
1	Kirsten Moore-Towers / Dylan Moscovitch	WO	187.63	1	64.73	1	122.90
2	Meagan Duhamel / Eric Radford	QC	171.34	4	57.71	2	113.63
3	Paige Lawrence / Rudi Swiegers	SK	168.11	2	59.38	3	108.73
4	Mylène Brodeur / John Mattatall	NS	163.12	3	58.78	4	104.34
5	Kaleigh Hole / Adam Johnson	WO	140.86	5	48.71	5	92.15
6	Brittany Jones / Kurtis Gaskell	WO	134.90	6	48.36	6	86.54
7	Noemie Arseneault / Simon-Pierre Côté	QC	131.65	7	46.44	7	85.21
8	Jade-Savannah Godin / Andrew Evans	QC	115.55	8	41.81	9	73.74
9	Margaret Purdy / Michael Marinaro	WO	111.30	9	37.28	8	74.02
10	Alexie Gélinas / David Struthers	QC	106.96	10	39.38	10	67.58

=== Ice dancing ===
Rank	Name	Section	Total points	SD		FD	
1	Vanessa Crone / Paul Poirier	WO	164.21	1	65.80	1	98.41
2	Kaitlyn Weaver / Andrew Poje	NO	163.18	2	65.64	2	97.54
3	Alexandra Paul / Mitchell Islam	CO	153.90	3	61.57	3	92.33
4	Kharis Ralph / Asher Hill	CO	143.57	4	57.27	4	86.30
5	Tarrah Harvey / Keith Gagnon	BC/YT	135.95	5	55.34	5	80.61
6	Sarah Arnold / Justin Trojek	WO	125.72	6	47.13	6	78.59
7	Alexa-Marie Arrotta / Martin Nickel	MB	108.93	7	46.98	8	61.95
8	Audrey Dupont / Marcus Connolly	QC	108.66	8	41.32	7	67.34
9	Helene Letourneau / Kevin Boczar	EO	100.91	9	39.56	9	61.35
10	Anne Chloe Bissonnette / Dylan Lockey Chatham	QC	83.80	10	34.22	10	49.58

== Junior results ==
=== Men ===
Rank	Name	Section	Total points	SP	FS
1	Nam Nguyen	BC/YT	169.89	2	1
2	Shaquille Davis	CO	145.55	3	4
3	Peter O'Brien	EO	142.42	4	2
4	Garrett Gosselin	SK	141.52	1	6
5	Michael Marinaro	WO	137.47	7	3
6	Iassen Petkov	CO	133.65	5	5
7	Jack Kermezian	QC	127.25	6	7
8	Samuel Angers	QC	123.92	9	8
9	Joel Bond	NO	122.22	10	10
10	Sasha Alcoloumbre	QC	121.08	11	9
11	Jérémie Boisier-Michaud	QC	110.71	8	16
12	Jacob Cryderman	NO	109.55	15	11
13	Maxime Deschamps	QC	108.33	13	12
14	Dylan Archambault	BC/YT	106.88	12	15
15	Pollux Yeung	BC/YT	104.36	14	16
16	Nicolas Yaskiw	QC	103.62	16	13
17	Christopher Blackmore	AB/NT/NU	102.07	17	14
18	Daniel Kratochvil	AB/NT/NU	93.42	18	18

=== Women ===
Rank	Name	Section	Total points	SP	FS
1	Roxanne Rheault	QC	123.66	1	2
2	Kitty Qian	BC/YT	121.29	4	1
3	Julianna Sagaria	QC	115.34	2	4
4	Natasha Purich	AB/NT/NU	115.28	6	3
5	Karelle Nadeau	QC	108.47	9	5
6	Kaetlyn Osmond	AB/NT/NU	108.16	5	8
7	Alexandra Gagnon	QC	107.83	3	9
8	Alexie Gélinas	QC	106.63	11	6
9	Cassandra McDonnell	WO	103.24	14	7
10	Alaine Chartrand	EO	102.10	7	12
11	Morgan Jmaiff	BC/YT	101.10	13	10
12	Zoey Brown	WO	99.73	15	11
13	Maude Gagnon	QC	98.67	8	15
14	Marylie Jorg	QC	95.49	16	14
15	Michelle Chung	CO	93.22	18	13
16	Kelsey Wiebe	BC/YT	91.48	12	17
17	Rachel Greben	CO	90.59	17	16
18	Chloé Larose	QC	90.57	10	18

=== Pairs ===
Rank	Name	Section	Total points	SP	FS
1	Natasha Purich / Raymond Schultz	AB/NT/NU	127.86	2	1
2	Tara Hancherow / Sébastien Wolfe	QC	126.27	1	2
3	Katherine Bobak / Matthew Penasse	WO	118.57	4	3
4	Taylor Steele / Robert Schultz	WO	116.11	3	5
5	Krystel Desjardins / Charlie Bilodeau	QC	112.76	6	4
6	Natalie Kwong / Garnet Suidy	AB/NT/NU	109.85	5	7
7	Kristen Tikel / Ian Beharry	WO	109.68	9	6
8	Aveline Pearson / Alexander Sheldrick	WO	106.66	7	8
9	Alexandra Young / Matthew Young	NL	103.45	10	9
10	Catherine Baldé / Maxime Deschamps	QC	100.18	11	10
11	Gabriella DeBono / Christopher Sisca	CO	99.83	8	11
12	Marianne Rioux Ouellet / Thomas Potvin	QC	91.30	12	12

=== Ice dancing ===
Rank	Name	Section	Total points	SD	FD
1	Nicole Orford / Thomas Williams	BC/YT	130.31	1	1
2	Kelly Oliveira / Jordan Hockley	CO	123.20	2	2
3	Victoria Hasegawa / Connor Hasegawa	QC	122.86	3	3
4	Andréanne Poulin / Marc-André Servant	QC	118.04	4	4
5	Élisabeth Paradis / François-Xavier Ouellette	QC	114.64	6	5
6	Laurence Fournier Beaudry / Yoan Breton	QC	114.39	5	6
7	Laurence Darveau / Jonathan Arcieri	QC	104.44	8	7
8	Larissa Van As / Troy Shindle	BC/YT	100.89	10	8
9	Jade Marrow / Allan Stoll	WO	100.04	11	9
10	Carolane Soucisse / Benjamin Smyth	QC	100.03	7	11
11	Josyane Cholette / Simon Proulx-Sénécal	QC	94.98	9	14
12	Olga Lioudvinevitch / Benjamin Mulder	WO	93.53	13	10
13	Sara Aghai / Qwynn Dalmer	BC/YT	91.80	12	12
14	Sarah Clarke / Steven Clarke	EO	86.79	14	13
15	Jazz Smyl Joly / Ryan Behnia	AB/NT/NU	81.66	15	15

== Novice results ==
=== Men ===
Rank	Name	Section	Total points	SP	FS
1	Mitchell Gordon	BC/YT	120.24	4	1
2	Mathieu Nepton	QC	119.28	1	2
3	Christophe Belley	QC	111.19	2	5
4	Alistair Sylvester	WO	110.29	3	4
5	Nicolas Tondreau-Alin	QC	106.02	10	3
6	Graeme Gordon	BC/YT	103.52	5	8
7	Leonardo Maekawa	BC/YT	102.07	11	6
8	Joshua Baemoon Bang	CO	100.01	7	9
9	Drew Wolfe	AB/NT/NU	98.91	16	7
10	Denis Margalik	CO	98.88	9	10
11	Francis Boudreau Audet	QC	96.47	12	11
12	Nicolas Beaudoin	QC	95.13	6	12
13	Shawn Cuevas	BC/YT	91.60	8	15
14	Sebastian Arcieri	QC	89.46	13	14
15	Francis Beaulieu	QC	87.05	14	16
16	Cole Vandervelden	AB/NT/NU	86.85	17	13
17	Dustin Sherriff-Clayton	CO	83.36	15	17
18	Leslie Ip	CO	72.22	18	18

=== Women ===
Rank	Name	Section	Total points	SP	FS
1	Marie-Gabrielle Hémond	QC	94.68	1	6
2	Ann-Sophie Gagnon	QC	94.45	3	4
3	Veronik Mallet	QC	94.26	18	1
4	Roxanne Cournoyer	QC	93.92	4	2
5	Madelyn Dunley	CO	92.38	10	5
6	Gabrielle Daleman	CO	91.82	12	3
7	Brianna Clarkson	WO	91.00	7	7
8	Anna McCorriston	EO	89.87	8	8
9	Marie-Eve Comtois	QC	87.01	2	12
10	Brianna Delmaestro	BC/YT	86.32	6	10
11	Karina Tjew	BC/YT	85.96	5	11
12	Kassie Costello	NB	85.18	15	9
13	Camille Ruest	QC	82.70	11	15
14	Monika Gala	AB/NT/NU	80.77	14	13
15	Brittany Jones	WO	79.50	13	16
16	Makayla Randall	BC/YT	79.29	9	18
17	Patricia Antifaoff	AB/NT/NU	78.72	17	14
18	Tanisha Valente	EO	76.22	16	17

=== Pairs ===
Rank	Name	Section	Total points	SP	FS
1	Shalena Rau / Phelan Simpson	WO	115.75	1	1
2	Mary Orr / Anthony Furiano	WO	108.20	2	2
3	Leah Hyslop / Bob Goodwin	WO	98.21	3	3
4	Dylan Conway / Dustin Sherriff-Clayton	CO	95.36	4	4
5	Claira Whicher / Wesley Killing	WO	93.59	5	5
6	Alexandra Brown / Spencer Buchanan	CO	84.46	7	9
7	Rebecca Marsh / Christopher Blackmore	AB/NT/NU	83.82	9	6
8	Gabrielle Daleman / Michael Zusev	CO	83.73	6	10
9	Julia Plechko / Christopher Cowell	CO	83.55	8	8
10	Marie-Laurence Bradette / Felix-Antoine Garneau-Picard	QC	81.79	11	7
11	Melissa Kustra / Paul Schatz	BC/YT	77.01	12	11
12	Tamara Jurkiewicz / Alexander Arpin	QC	72.93	10	12

=== Ice dancing ===
Rank	Name	Section	Total points	CD1	CD2	FD
1	Madeline Edwards / Zhao Kai Pang	BC/YT	127.30	1	1	1
2	Noa Bruser / Timothy Lum	BC/YT	118.03	4	4	2
3	Mackenzie Bent / Garrett MacKeen	EO	116.90	3	2	3
4	Caelen Dalmer / Shane Firus	BC/YT	109.42	5	3	5
5	Sara Yacobi-Harris / Raphael Yacobi-Harris	CO	103.77	2	5	7
6	Katie Desveaux / Dmitre Razgulajevs	CO	102.37	6	6	8
7	Pilar Maekawa / Leonardo Maekawa	BC/YT	101.46	12	7	4
8	Lauren Collins / Danny Seymour	CO	97.15	10	14	6
9	Rebecca Nelles / Nicholas Lettner	EO	95.86	7	10	9
10	Courtney Baay / Drew Wolfe	AB/NT/NU	94.43	9	8	10
11	Judith Jean-Lachapelle / Alexandre Laliberté	QC	92.00	8	9	13
12	Jayden Rau / Alexander Green	NS	90.58	13	12	11
13	Elise von Holwede / Rhys Jones	SK	90.51	11	11	12
14	Chelsea Robinson / Nicholas Toth	WO	81.11	14	13	14
15	Jenna Zaleski / Andrew Deweyert	WO	77.04	15	15	15
