= 2012 Canadian Figure Skating Championships =

Figure skating competition

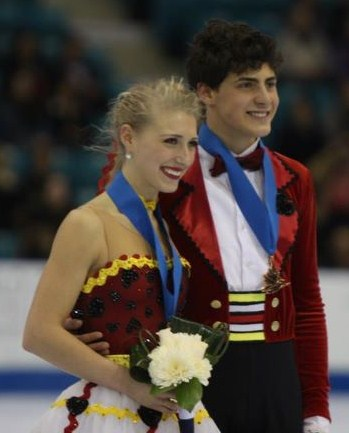
- Piper Gilles & Paul Poirier 2012 Canadian Figure Skating Championships
- Type: National Championship
- Date: January 16 – 22
- Season: 2011–12
- Location: Moncton, New Brunswick
- Host: Skate Canada
- Venue: Moncton Coliseum

Champions
- Men's singles: Patrick Chan
- Ladies' singles: Amelie Lacoste
- Pairs: Meagan Duhamel / Eric Radford
- Ice dance: Tessa Virtue / Scott Moir
- Previous: 2011 Canadian Championships
- Next: 2013 Canadian Championships

The 2012 Canadian Figure Skating Championships was held from January 16 to 22, 2012 at the Moncton Coliseum in Moncton, New Brunswick. The event determined the national champions of Canada and was organized by Skate Canada, the nation's figure skating governing body. Skaters competed at the senior, junior, and novice levels in the disciplines of men's singles, women's singles, pair skating, and ice dancing. Although the official International Skating Union terminology for female skaters in the singles category is ladies, Skate Canada uses women officially. The results of this competition were among the selection criteria for the 2012 World Championships, 2012 Four Continents Championships, and the 2012 World Junior Championships.

== Senior results ==
=== Men ===
Rank	Name	Section	Total points	SP		FS	
1	Patrick Chan	CO	302.14	1	101.33	1	200.81
2	Kevin Reynolds	BC/YT	239.44	2	80.81	2	158.63
3	Jeremy Ten	BC/YT	207.50	3	70.81	4	136.69
4	Elladj Balde	QC	206.53	4	68.32	3	138.21
5	Andrei Rogozine	CO	188.64	6	60.82	5	127.82
6	Liam Firus	BC/YT	187.78	5	66.34	7	121.44
7	Nam Nguyen	BC/YT	179.28	8	57.32	6	121.96
8	Raphael Yacobi-Harris	CO	169.82	9	56.19	8	113.63
9	Samuel Morais	QC	166.08	7	59.19	9	106.89
10	Maxime-Billy Fortin	QC	156.71	10	52.17	10	104.54
11	Dave Ferland	QC	155.05	11	51.18	11	103.87
12	Charles Dion	QC	150.10	13	50.70	13	99.40
13	Sasha Alcoloumbre	QC	150.05	16	47.51	12	102.54
14	Shaquille Davis	CO	144.20	13	48.93	14	95.27
15	Dominic Rondeau	QC	131.83	15	48.53	16	83.30
16	Benjamin Tidy	QC	130.46	17	46.38	15	84.08
17	David Struthers	QC	128.09	18	45.46	17	82.63
18	Benjamin Guthrie	NO	122.48	14	48.83	18	73.65

=== Women ===
Rank	Name	Section	Total points	SP		FS	
1	Amelie Lacoste	QC	159.51	2	52.43	2	107.08
2	Cynthia Phaneuf	QC	157.94	4	49.66	1	108.28
3	Kaetlyn Osmond	AB/NT/NU	155.47	1	56.94	4	98.53
4	Alexandra Najarro	CO	151.56	3	52.34	3	99.22
5	Adriana DeSanctis	CO	142.66	7	46.05	5	96.61
6	Kate Charbonneau	MB	142.06	8	45.54	6	96.52
7	Vanessa Grenier	QC	136.05	6	47.49	8	88.56
8	Roxanne Rheault	QC	132.21	5	47.58	9	84.63
9	Alaine Chartrand	EO	128.77	15	39.45	7	89.32
10	Alexandra Gagnon	QC	124.70	12	41.46	10	83.24
11	Sarah Jourdain	QC	123.77	9	43.45	12	80.32
12	Kaleigh Hole	MB	118.35	18	37.50	11	80.85
13	Devon Neuls	AB/NT/NU	109.79	10	42.74	15	67.05
14	Christina Yan	CO	109.19	11	42.46	16	66.73
15	Rachel Gendron	QC	109.00	13	40.73	14	68.27
16	Cambria Little	BC/YT	108.39	14	39.62	13	68.77
17	Alexie Gélinas	QC	105.60	17	39.34	17	66.26
18	Izabel Valiquette	QC	101.69	16	39.35	18	62.34

=== Pairs ===
Rank	Name	Section	Total points	SP		FS	
1	Meagan Duhamel / Eric Radford	QC	190.11	1	60.92	1	129.19
2	Jessica Dubé / Sébastien Wolfe	QC	171.60	2	60.65	2	110.95
3	Paige Lawrence / Rudi Swiegers	SK	168.84	4	58.55	3	110.29
4	Kirsten Moore-Towers / Dylan Moscovitch	WO	164.42	3	60.26	4	104.16
5	Taylor Steele / Rob Schultz	WO	144.33	8	46.88	5	97.45
6	Margaret Purdy / Michael Marinaro	WO	142.40	6	49.27	7	93.13
7	Brittany Jones / Kurtis Gaskell	WO	141.26	5	53.16	10	88.10
8	Natasha Purich / Raymond Schultz	AB/NT/NU	140.97	7	47.42	6	93.55
9	Julianne Séguin / Andrew Evans	QC	135.59	9	45.82	8	89.77
10	Noemie Arseneault / Simon-Pierre Côté	QC	132.64	10	44.03	9	88.61
11	Alexie Gélinas / David Struthers	QC	118.13	11	39.79	11	78.34
12	Andrea Tou / Matthew Penasse	CO	101.17	12	37.58	12	63.59

=== Ice dancing ===
Rank	Name	Section	Total points	SD		FD	
1	Tessa Virtue / Scott Moir	WO	180.02	1	68.41	1	111.61
2	Kaitlyn Weaver / Andrew Poje	NO	174.53	2	68.27	2	106.26
3	Piper Gilles / Paul Poirier	CO	163.54	3	62.78	3	100.76
4	Kharis Ralph / Asher Hill	CO	147.51	4	58.92	6	88.59
5	Alexandra Paul / Mitchell Islam	CO	146.48	5	57.30	4	89.18
6	Nicole Orford / Thomas Williams	BC/YT	145.53	6	56.58	5	88.95
7	Tarrah Harvey /Keith Gagnon	BC/YT	137.41	7	53.87	7	83.54
8	Larissa Van As / Troy Shindle	BC/YT	109.80	11	38.52	8	71.28
9	Mélissande Dumas / David Mackay Perry	QC	106.22	9	39.40	9	66.82
10	Shanna René De Cotret-Laporte / Alexandre Laliberté	QC	106.02	8	42.60	12	63.42
11	Anoushka Ritchie-Hervieux / Philippe Massé	QC	105.15	10	39.02	10	66.13
12	Olga Lioudvinevitch / Benjamin Mulder	WO	104.49	12	38.37	11	66.12
13	Helene Letourneau / Kevin Boczar	EO	104.49	13	37.21	13	59.30
14	Jazz Smyl Joly / Nicholas Jesionek	AB/NT/NU	86.35	14	31.60	14	54.75

== Junior results ==
=== Men ===
Rank	Name	Section	Total points	SP		FS	
1	Mitchell Gordon	BC/YT	161.04	3	51.38	1	109.66
2	Peter O Brien	EO	160.26	2	51.69	2	108.57
3	Joel Bond	NO	146.56	1	52.30	3	94.26
4	Iassen Petkov	CO	141.58	6	47.56	4	94.02
5	Alistair Sylvester	WO	136.29	5	48.07	6	88.22
6	Christophe Belley	QC	131.56	12	41.56	5	90.00
7	Drew Wolfe	AB/NT/NU	130.02	8	45.73	8	84.29
8	Dustin Sherriff-Clayton	CO	130.02	4	49.62	10	80.40
9	Nicolas Beaudoin	QC	128.54	9	45.28	9	83.26
10	Jack Kermezian	QC	125.48	7	45.86	11	79.62
11	Graeme Gordon	BC/YT	125.26	18	38.97	7	86.29
12	Cole Vandervelden	AB/NT/NU	119.83	10	44.97	15	74.86
13	Nicolas Tondreau-Alin	QC	119.71	14	41.25	12	78.46
14	Denis Margalik	CO	119.18	13	41.52	14	77.66
15	Francis Boudreau Audet	QC	117.15	16	39.31	13	77.84
16	Alexander Zahariev	CO	110.72	11	41.69	16	69.03
17	Francis Beaulieu	QC	104.89	15	40.05	17	64.84
18	Alexandre Vaugeois	QC	103.78	17	39.19	18	64.59

=== Women ===
Rank	Name	Section	Total points	SP		FS	
1	Gabrielle Daleman	CO	130.57	1	47.59	1	82.98
2	Veronik Mallet	QC	125.01	3	42.88	2	82.13
3	Julianne Séguin	QC	123.77	2	43.10	4	80.67
4	Roxanne Cournoyer	QC	123.12	5	41.52	3	81.60
5	Rachel Greben	CO	107.77	7	39.88	6	67.89
6	Marie-Eve Comtois	QC	104.33	14	34.71	5	69.62
7	Brianna Clarkson	WO	103.93	8	38.23	8	65.70
8	Natasha Purich	AB/NT/NU	102.03	4	42.41	15	59.62
9	Alexandra Rynn	AB/NT/NU	99.50	15	33.65	7	65.85
10	Elizabeth Comeau	EO	99.46	12	35.14	9	64.32
11	Jennifer Pettem	EO	98.30	10	36.38	13	61.92
12	Cassandra McDonnell	WO	97.58	11	36.12	14	61.46
13	Kelsey Wiebe	BC/YT	97.19	16	33.27	10	63.92
14	Ann-Sophie Gagnon	QC	96.02	18	32.42	11	63.60
15	Valérie Bergeron	QC	95.84	17	32.74	12	63.10
16	Samantha Tsui	CO	93.59	9	37.25	16	56.34
17	Brittany Jones	WO	91.32	13	35.02	17	56.30
18	Olivia Houston	CO	90.28	6	39.99	18	50.29

=== Pairs ===
Rank	Name	Section	Total points	SP		FS	
1	Katherine Bobak / Ian Beharry	WO	149.96	1	51.17	1	98.79
2	Krystel Desjardins / Charlie Bilodeau	QC	122.47	3	40.10	2	82.37
3	Mary Orr / Anthony Furiano	WO	119.63	2	40.43	3	79.20
4	Shalena Rau / Phelan Simpson	WO	115.57	4	38.82	4	76.75
5	Leah Hyslop / Bob Goodwin	WO	102.82	6	33.45	5	69.37
6	Alexandra Young / Matthew Young	NL	102.10	5	34.94	6	67.16
7	Tamara Jurkiewicz / Alexander Arpin	QC	85.58	7	32.36	7	53.22

=== Ice dancing ===
Rank	Name	Section	Total points	SD		FD	
1	Andréanne Poulin / Marc-André Servant	QC	131.47	2	55.14	1	76.33
2	Madeline Edwards / Zhao Kai Pang	BC/YT	129.55	1	56.81	4	72.74
3	Noa Bruser / Timothy Lum	BC/YT	125.84	7	51.68	2	74.16
4	Mackenzie Bent / Garrett MacKeen	EO	125.57	6	52.16	3	73.41
5	Victoria Hasegawa / Connor Hasegawa	QC	125.51	4	54.33	6	71.18
6	Élisabeth Paradis / François-Xavier Ouellette	QC	124.58	5	52.72	5	71.86
7	Caelen Dalmer / Shane Firus	BC/YT	124.15	3	54.51	7	69.64
8	Mariève Cyr / Benjamin Brisebois Gaudreau	QC	107.12	8	43.37	8	63.75
9	Rachel Kirkland / Christopher Lettner	CO	100.78	12	39.46	9	61.32
10	Nicole Kuzmich / Jordan Hockley	CO	100.53	11	40.31	10	60.22
11	Josyane Cholette / Simon Proulx-Sénécal	QC	95.17	9	42.69	13	52.48
12	Laurence Fournier Beaudry / Yoan Breton	QC	91.79	13	38.59	12	53.20
13	Rebecca Nelles / Nicholas Lettner	EO	91.37	14	36.27	11	55.10
14	Sarah Clarke / Steven Clarke	EO	75.65	15	32.93	14	42.72
WD	Carolane Soucisse / Benjamin Smyth	QC		10	42.48		

== Novice results ==
=== Men ===
Rank	Name	Section	Total points	SP		FS	
1	Anthony Kan	CO	123.41	1	41.70	2	81.71
2	Roman Sadovsky	CO	115.11	2	41.59	4	73.52
3	Nicolas Nadeau	QC	113.77	12	30.40	1	83.37
4	Bennet Toman	QC	113.22	4	37.00	3	76.22
5	Daniel-Olivier Boulanger-Trottier	QC	103.40	3	38.32	6	65.08
6	Mathieu Ostiguy	QC	100.09	9	32.50	5	67.59
7	Shawn Cuevas	BC/YT	98.94	5	35.57	8	63.37
8	Adonis Wong	BC/YT	97.28	7	33.22	7	64.06
9	Laurent Guay	QC	95.96	8	32.93	9	63.03
10	Christopher Mostert	AB/NT/NU	94.58	6	33.81	11	60.77
11	Leslie Ip	CO	92.05	13	30.11	10	61.94
12	Trennt Michaud	EO	86.84	11	30.67	13	56.17
13	Tyler Miller	BC/YT	86.01	16	29.09	12	56.92
14	Jarret Melanson	NO	84.34	15	29.48	14	54.86
15	Jeff Hough	EO	82.77	10	31.85	16	50.92
16	Bryce Chudak	AB/NT/NU	82.11	14	30.10	15	52.01
17	Philippe Trépanier-Bettez	QC	78.25	17	27.66	17	50.59
18	Raphael Pelletier	QC	71.57	18	22.02	18	49.55

=== Women ===
Rank	Name	Section	Total points	SP		FS	
1	Madelyn Dunley	CO	110.10	1	38.39	1	71.71
2	Larkyn Austman	BC/YT	105.01	3	36.02	2	68.99
3	Haley Sales	BC/YT	99.08	2	36.44	4	62.64
4	Marianne Rioux Ouellet	QC	98.56	4	35.75	3	62.81
5	Sandrine Martin	QC	92.66	7	32.19	5	60.47
6	Alex-Anne Aubé Kubel	QC	90.54	9	31.47	6	59.07
7	Zoe Gong	EO	88.69	11	30.18	7	58.51
8	Elisabeth Dyer	AB/NT/NU	88.45	10	31.42	10	57.03
9	Lisa Nasu-Yu	EO	87.72	12	29.56	9	58.16
10	Valerie Lavergne	QC	87.18	5	34.31	17	52.87
11	Britanny Giuseppe Clarke	QC	86.91	15	28.45	8	58.46
12	Shelby Hall	SK	86.30	8	32.19	13	54.11
13	Alexandra Nantel Dupuis	QC	83.27	14	29.02	11	54.25
14	Ceduna Magee	AB/NT/NU	83.04	13	29.22	15	53.82
15	Cailey England	BC/YT	82.73	6	32.46	18	50.27
16	Jennifer Mahoney	NS	81.53	16	27.28	12	54.25
17	Melina Di Lauro	QC	80.97	17	27.07	14	53.90
18	Hayleigh Bell	CO	79.92	18	26.68	16	53.24

=== Pairs ===
Rank	Name	Section	Total points	SP		FS	
1	Hayleigh Bell / Alistair Sylvester	CO	118.22	1	39.76	1	78.46
2	Dylan Conway / Dustin Sherriff-Clayton	CO	105.90	2	37.92	2	67.98
3	Marie-Laurence Bradette / Felix-Antoine Garneau-Picard	QC	93.88	5	32.21	3	61.67
4	Madelyn Dunley / Wesley Killing	WO	91.50	4	32.57	4	58.93
5	Jordyn Harper / Shaquille Davis	CO	91.07	3	32.90	5	58.17
6	Kendra Digness / Cole Vandervelden	AB/NT/NU	84.96	6	31.65	7	53.31
7	Julia Mercer / Spencer Buchanan	QC	84.62	8	28.12	6	56.50
8	Jessica Landry / Sebastian M. Arcieri	QC	80.49	7	30.10	8	50.39
9	Sabrina Vigneault / Cedric Savard	QC	72.56	10	25.29	9	47.27
10	Elizabeth Swenor / Rocky Sweno	CO	69.96	9	25.80	10	44.16

=== Ice dancing ===
Rank	Name	Section	Total points	PD1		PD2		FD	
1	Lauren Collins / Danny Seymour	CO	87.55	3	12.73	4	13.76	1	61.06
2	Melinda Meng / Andrew Meng	QC	87.34	1	13.91	3	13.91	2	59.52
3	Samantha Glavine / Jeff Hough	EO	84.82	4	12.27	2	13.93	3	58.62
4	Katie Desveaux / Dmitre Razgulajevs	CO	84.09	2	13.34	1	14.33	4	56.42
5	Haili Moyer / Aaron Chapplain	CO	78.20	6	11.05	6	12.05	5	55.10
6	Jade Robitaille / Dominic Barthe	QC	74.91	5	11.54	5	12.25	7	51.12
7	Audrey Croteau-Villeneuve / Simon Longtin-Martel	QC	73.58	10	10.98	12	11.20	6	51.40
8	Nevada Evelyn Smith / Addison Voldeng	SK	71.56	9	11.00	8	11.92	9	48.64
9	Christina Penkov / Christopher Mostert	AB/NT/NU	69.86	14	9.24	9	11.67	8	48.95
10	Bianka Gadosy / Simon Dazé	QC	69.17	7	11.05	7	11.99	11	46.13
11	Ekaterina Fedyushchenko / Jean-Luc Jackson	WO	68.54	8	11.04	11	11.32	10	46.18
12	Abby Savoie / Dennis Romanenko	CO	65.91	12	10.30	10	11.44	12	44.17
13	Jaimie Clarke / Matthew Webb	NS	65.77	11	10.84	13	11.03	13	43.90
14	Catherine Daigle-Roy / Alexis St-Louis	QC	58.78	13	9.93	14	10.69	15	38.16
15	Elise von Holwede / Eric Streichsbier	BC/YT	57.11	15	9.22	15	9.62	14	38.27

== International team selections ==
=== World Championships ===
The Canadian team to the 2012 World Championships:

	Men	Ladies	Pairs	Ice dancing
1	Patrick Chan	Amelie Lacoste	Meagan Duhamel / Eric Radford	Tessa Virtue / Scott Moir
2	Kevin Reynolds		Jessica Dubé / Sebastien Wolfe	Kaitlyn Weaver / Andrew Poje
3				Kharis Ralph / Asher Hill

Of the top two ladies' skaters at nationals, the one who places highest at Four Continents Championships will receive the berth to the World Championships.

=== Four Continents Championships ===
The Canadian team to the 2012 Four Continents Championships:

	Men	Ladies	Pairs	Ice dancing
1	Patrick Chan	Amélie Lacoste	Meagan Duhamel / Eric Radford	Tessa Virtue / Scott Moir
2	Kevin Reynolds	Cynthia Phaneuf	Jessica Dubé / Sebastien Wolfe	Kaitlyn Weaver / Andrew Poje
3	Jeremy Ten	Alexandra Najarro	Paige Lawrence / Rudi Swiegers	Alexandra Paul / Mitchell Islam

=== World Junior Championships ===
The Canadian team to the 2012 World Junior Championships:

	Men	Ladies	Pairs	Ice dancing
1	Liam Firus	Kaetlyn Osmond	Katherine Bobak / Ian Beharry	Nicole Orford / Thomas Williams
2	Nam Nguyen		Margaret Purdy / Michael Marinaro	Andréanne Poulin / Marc-André Servant
3			Hayleigh Bell / Alistair Sylvester	
