= 2013 Canadian Figure Skating Championships =

Figure skating competition

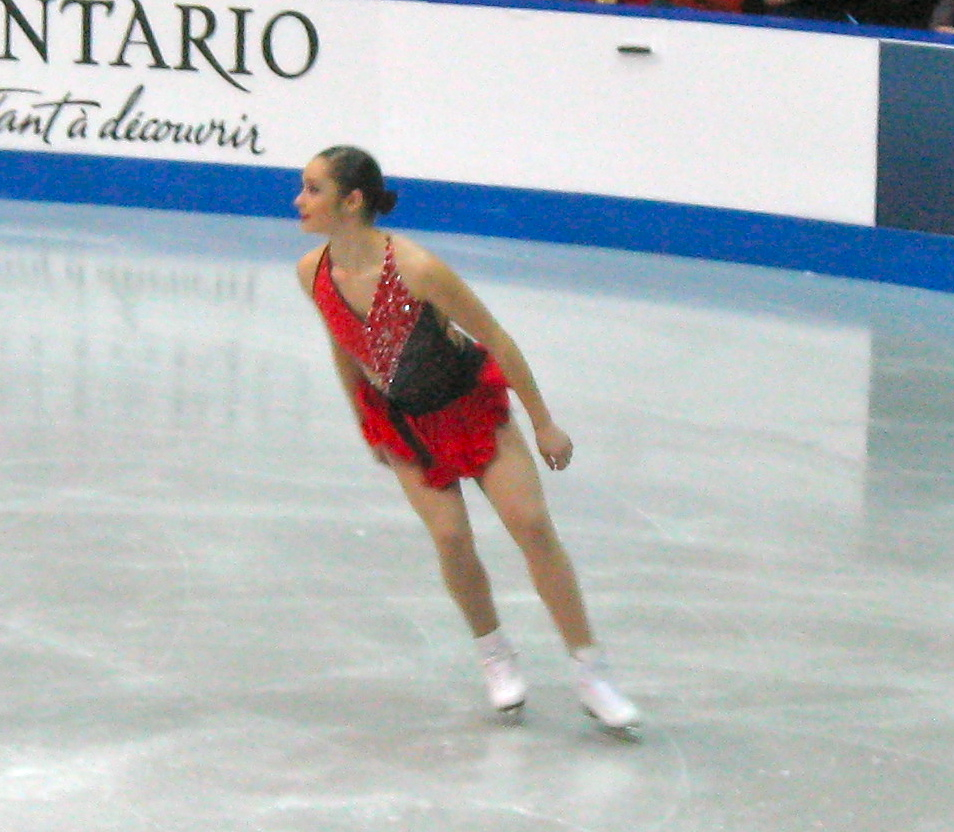
- Type: National championship
- Date: January 13 – 20
- Season: 2012–13
- Location: Mississauga, Ontario
- Host: Skate Canada
- Venue: Hershey Centre

Champions
- Men's singles: Patrick Chan (S); Anthony Kan (J); Daniel-Olivier Boulanger-Trottier (N)
- Ladies' singles: Kaetlyn Osmond (S); Larykn Austman (J); Zoe Gong (N)
- Pairs: Meagan Duhamel / Eric Radford (S); Hayleigh Bell / Alistair Sylvester (J); Rachael Dobson / Alexander Sheldrick (N)
- Ice dance: Tessa Virtue / Scott Moir (S); Madeline Edwards / Zhao Kai Pang (J); Danielle Woo / Spencer Soo (N)
- Previous: 2012 Canadian Championships
- Next: 2014 Canadian Championships

The 2013 Canadian Figure Skating Championships were held from January 13 to 20, 2013 at the Hershey Centre in Mississauga, Ontario. The event determined the national champions of Canada and was organized by Skate Canada, the nation's figure skating governing body. Medals were awarded in the disciplines of men's singles, women's singles, pair skating, and ice dancing on the senior, junior, and novice levels. Although the official International Skating Union terminology for female skaters in the singles category is ladies, Skate Canada uses women officially. The results of this competition are among the selection criteria for the 2013 World Championships, 2013 Four Continents Championships, and the 2013 World Junior Championships.

== Overview ==
Patrick Chan won his sixth national title. Kevin Reynolds won the silver medal with a free skating that included a 4T, 4S, 4T+3T, and 3A+3T.

Kaetlyn Osmond won her first national title. Gabrielle Daleman and Alaine Chartrand joined her on the podium while the defending champion, Amelie Lacoste, finished just off the podium.

Meagan Duhamel / Eric Radford defended their title in a close race with Kirsten Moore-Towers / Dylan Moscovitch.

Tessa Virtue / Scott Moir won their fifth national title.

Police were called to break up a scuffle among a group of skaters after the event. A Skate Canada representative said no top skaters were involved.

== Senior results ==
=== Men ===
Rank	Name	Section	Total points	SP		FS	
1	Patrick Chan	CO	273.75	1	94.63	1	179.12
2	Kevin Reynolds	BC/YT	261.26	2	85.32	2	175.94
3	Andrei Rogozine	CO	207.85	4	70.42	3	137.43
4	Elladj Baldé	QC	204.44	5	68.47	5	135.97
5	Liam Firus	BC/YT	202.41	3	75.33	8	127.08
6	Nam Nguyen	CO	200.69	6	67.90	6	132.79
7	Mitchell Gordon	BC/YT	190.99	11	54.00	4	136.99
8	Jeremy Ten	BC/YT	189.22	7	64.06	9	125.16
9	Peter O'Brien	EO	188.03	8	60.55	7	127.48
10	Garrett Gosselin	SK	183.51	10	59.64	10	123.87
11	Emanuel Sandhu	BC/YT	176.18	9	60.42	12	115.76
12	Ian Martinez	QC	164.16	17	42.88	11	121.28
13	Samuel Angers	QC	159.44	15	49.81	13	109.63
14	Samuel Morais	QC	158.42	13	52.74	14	105.68
15	Shaquille Davis	CO	154.07	12	53.02	15	101.05
16	Graeme Gordon	BC/YT	147.74	16	48.05	16	99.69
17	Sasha Alcoloumbre	QC	133.81	14	52.23	17	81.58
18	Dustin Sherriff-Clayton	CO	117.41	18	36.43	18	80.98

=== Women ===
Rank	Name	Section	Total points	SP		FS	
1	Kaetlyn Osmond	AB/NT/NU	201.34	1	70.04	1	131.30
2	Gabrielle Daleman	CO	163.90	5	51.80	2	112.10
3	Alaine Chartrand	EO	157.22	6	50.76	3	106.46
4	Amélie Lacoste	QC	156.14	2	57.86	4	98.28
5	Veronik Mallet	QC	143.87	7	48.03	5	95.84
6	Julianne Séguin	QC	131.77	3	53.93	14	77.84
7	Adriana DeSanctis	CO	130.69	4	52.18	13	78.51
8	Rachel Gendron	QC	129.61	8	47.05	8	82.56
9	Kate Charbonneau	MB	126.01	14	43.61	9	82.40
10	Roxanne Cournoyer	QC	125.67	16	42.57	6	83.10
11	Kelsey McNeil	NB	124.42	10	45.37	12	79.05
12	Vanessa Grenier	QC	124.03	17	41.36	7	82.67
13	Alexe Gilles	CO	123.94	12	43.99	10	79.95
14	Gabrielle Anne Cormier	NB	123.75	11	44.09	11	79.66
15	Alexandra Gagnon	QC	122.48	9	46.21	16	76.27
16	Jessica-Amy Sergeant	AB/NT/NU	121.40	13	43.67	15	77.73
17	Sarah Jourdain	QC	112.48	15	42.97	17	69.51
WD	Roxanne Rheault	QC		18	39.40		

=== Pairs ===
Rank	Name	Section	Total points	SP		FS	
1	Meagan Duhamel / Eric Radford	QC	206.63	1	69.08	1	137.55
2	Kirsten Moore-Towers / Dylan Moscovitch	WO	204.54	2	68.23	2	136.31
3	Paige Lawrence / Rudi Swiegers	SK	171.13	3	54.42	3	116.71
4	Brittany Jones / Ian Beharry	WO	158.47	5	51.57	4	106.90
5	Margaret Purdy / Michael Marinaro	WO	154.29	4	54.25	5	100.04
6	Taylor Steele / Simon-Pierre Côté	WO	131.33	6	44.04	6	87.29

=== Ice dancing ===
Rank	Name	Section	Total points	SD		FD	
1	Tessa Virtue / Scott Moir	WO	187.23	1	79.04	1	108.19
2	Piper Gilles / Paul Poirier	CO	170.81	2	67.95	2	102.86
3	Nicole Orford / Thomas Williams	BC/YT	152.56	4	61.52	3	91.04
4	Alexandra Paul / Mitchell Islam	CO	151.73	3	66.24	5	85.49
5	Kharis Ralph / Asher Hill	CO	140.86	5	52.08	4	88.78
6	Andréanne Poulin / Marc-André Servant	QC	133.85	7	50.57	6	83.28
7	Élisabeth Paradis / François-Xavier Ouellette	QC	132.83	6	51.20	7	81.63
8	Larissa Van As / Troy Shindle	BC/YT	119.80	8	47.07	8	72.73
9	Mélissande Dumas / David Mackay Perry	QC	99.52	9	40.86	9	58.66

== Junior results ==
=== Men ===
Rank	Name	Section	Total points	SP		FS	
1	Anthony Kan	CO	167.54	1	60.67	1	106.87
2	Denis Margalik	CO	164.60	2	58.71	2	105.89
3	Mathieu Nepton	QC	149.90	5	51.33	3	98.57
4	Leslie Ip	CO	148.18	4	53.87	4	94.31
5	Jack Kermezian	QC	141.01	7	49.78	5	91.23
6	Nicolas Nadeau	QC	140.90	3	57.09	9	83.81
7	Shawn Cuevas	BC/YT	138.04	9	48.36	7	89.68
8	Nicolas Beaudoin	QC	132.47	6	50.15	11	82.32
9	Nicolas Tondreau-Alin	QC	131.39	15	40.89	6	90.50
10	Christopher Mostert	AB/NT/NU	130.28	10	46.92	10	83.36
11	Bennet Toman	QC	128.01	12	42.70	8	85.31
12	Drew Wolfe	AB/NT/NU	124.80	11	43.24	12	81.56
13	Alexander Zahariev	CO	121.45	8	49.75	14	71.70
14	Cole Vandervelden	QB/NT/NU	119.98	13	42.42	13	77.56
15	Mathieu Ostiguy	QC	111.62	14	42.00	15	69.62
16	Francis Boudreau Audet	QC	109.04	16	40.38	16	68.66
17	Kurtis Hori	BC/YT	99.99	17	38.69	17	61.30
18	Bryce Chudak	AB/NT/NU	98.51	18	37.35	18	61.16

=== Women ===
Rank	Name	Section	Total points	SP		FS	
1	Larkyn Austman	BC/YT	149.75	1	48.78	1	100.97
2	Marika Steward	NO	123.85	6	43.07	2	80.78
3	Madelyn Dunley	CO	122.04	7	42.52	3	79.52
4	Natasha Purich	AB/NT/NU	121.90	2	44.27	5	77.63
5	Marianne Rioux Ouellet	QC	121.85	8	42.44	4	79.41
6	Cassandra McDonnell	WO	115.45	11	40.03	6	75.42
7	Justine Gosselin	QC	112.89	3	44.14	10	68.75
8	Cailey England	BC/YT	102.03	12	39.84	7	71.66
9	Kelsey MacLean	EO	110.36	9	40.81	9	69.55
10	Sandrine Martin	QC	99.46	14	39.20	8	69.80
11	Shelby Hall	SK	105.75	13	39.83	11	65.92
12	Melodie Dore	WO	104.64	10	40.48	13	64.16
13	Camille Ruest	QC	104.36	4	43.45	15	60.91
14	Kassie Costello	NB	103.52	5	43.38	17	60.14
15	Anna McCorriston	EO	101.19	16	36.00	12	65.19
16	Hayleigh Bell	CO	98.49	15	39.10	18	59.39
17	Kim Deguise Leveillee	QC	94.95	17	34.36	16	60.59
18	Nikki Mattocks	EO	90.31	18	28.91	14	61.40

=== Pairs ===
Rank	Name	Section	Total points	SP		FS	
1	Hayleigh Bell / Alistair Sylvester	CO	140.60	1	47.73	1	92.87
2	Natasha Purich / Sebastien Ariceri	QC	131.65	2	42.53	2	89.12
3	Mary Orr / Anthony Furiano	WO	126.48	4	41.72	3	84.76
4	Shalena Rau / Phelan Simpson	WO	120.31	3	41.79	4	78.52
5	Dylan Conway / Dustin Sherriff-Clayton	CO	106.35	5	39.76	6	66.59
6	Alexandra Young / Matthew Young	NL	102.98	6	36.38	5	66.60
7	Naomie Boudreau / Maxime Deschamps	QC	100.03	8	35.15	7	64.88
8	Julia Mercer / Wesley Killing	QC	95.78	7	35.43	8	60.35

=== Ice dancing ===
Rank	Name	Section	Total points	SD		FD	
1	Madeline Edwards / Zhao Kai Pang	BC/YT	145.25	2	59.01	1	86.24
2	Mackenzie Bent / Garrett MacKeen	EO	144.49	1	60.62	2	83.87
3	Caelen Delmer / Shane Firus	BC/YT	129.26	3	52.73	3	76.53
4	Victoria Hasegawa / Connor Hasegawa	QC	123.18	4	52.22	4	70.96
5	Mariève Cyr / Benjamin Brisebois Gaudreau	QC	119.67	6	48.86	5	70.81
6	Melinda Meng / Andrew Meng	QC	118.75	5	50.31	6	68.44
7	Katie Desveaux / Dmitre Razgulajevs	CO	115.53	8	46.91	7	66.62
8	Bianka Gadosvy / Benjamin Smyth	QC	109.99	7	48.10	10	61.89
9	Carolane Soucisse / Simon Tanguay	QC	109.16	9	44.94	8	64.22
10	Lauren Collins / Danny Seymour	CO	104.62	13	42.34	9	62.28
11	Samantha Glavine / Jeff Hough	EO	100.27	12	42.85	13	57.42
12	Haili Moyer / Aaron Chapplain	CO	100.22	14	42.27	11	57.95
13	Marina Barova / Allan Stoll	WO	99.53	15	41.73	12	57.80
14	Nicole Kuzmich / Jordan Hockley	CO	75.65	10	43.56	14	55.56
15	Christina Penkov / Simon Proulx-Sénécal	QC	96.99	11	43.48	15	53.21

== Novice results ==
=== Men ===
Rank	Name	Section	Total points	SP		FS	
1	Daniel-Olivier Boulanger-Trottier	QC	128.53	1	44.91	1	83.62
2	Eric Liu	BC/YT	120.53	5	38.85	2	81.68
3	Antony Cheng	CO	120.18	3	40.71	3	79.47
4	Mitchell Brennan	CO	108.79	7	36.69	4	72.10
5	Adonis Wong	BC/YT	105.46	6	37.26	5	68.20
6	Alexander Lawrence	BC/YT	104.68	4	39.19	6	65.49
7	Liam Mahood	CO	100.21	8	36.27	8	63.94
8	Trennt Michaud	EO	98.83	9	34.07	7	64.76
9	Laurent Guay	QC	97.29	10	33.70	9	63.59
10	Hugh Brabyn-Jones	EO	91.35	11	31.55	11	59.80
11	Olivier Bergeron	QC	91.18	2	41.10	16	50.08
12	Grayson Rosen	AB/NT/NU	90.01	16	28.90	10	61.11
13	Kurtis Schreiber	BC/YT	98.87	13	30.29	12	59.58
14	Cody Adam Wong	QC	98.47	12	30.68	13	58.79
15	Davin Portz	AB/NT/NU	83.14	14	30.10	14	53.04
16	Maxime Carbonneau	QC	76.88	17	26.51	15	50.37
17	Jarret Melanson	NO	73.92	18	26.24	17	47.68
18	Andrew Meng	QC	70.30	15	29.27	18	41.03

=== Women ===
Rank	Name	Section	Total points	SP		FS	
1	Zoe Gong	EO	108.48	3	36.15	1	72.33
2	Maysie Poliziani	WO	107.87	1	36.58	2	71.29
3	Julianne Delaurier	BC/YT	104.92	2	36.53	6	68.39
4	Kelsey Wong	BC/YT	104.42	4	35.97	5	68.45
5	Taylor LeClaire	AB/NT/NU	103.81	6	34.69	3	69.12
6	Emy Decelles	QC	101.29	10	32.43	4	68.86
7	Belvina Mao	BC/YT	99.99	5	35.96	7	64.03
8	Lily Markovski	CO	92.90	11	32.17	10	60.73
9	Patricia Antifaoff	CO	92.82	8	34.05	11	58.77
10	Stephie Walmsley	NS	92.05	15	28.57	9	63.48
11	Valerie Crispin	QC	91.95	16	28.34	8	63.61
12	Kira Gallant	AB/NT/NU	91.77	9	33.92	12	57.85
13	Pascale Pilote Harvey	QC	88.18	7	34.07	16	54.11
14	Jennifer Mahoney	NS	86.56	13	30.31	13	56.25
15	Dana Bobyn	BC/YT	84.83	14	28.99	14	55.84
16	Stephanie Marcus	QC	81.46	12	30.92	17	50.54
17	Ophélie Doucet	QC	80.01	18	24.84	15	55.17
18	Jordyn Harper	CO	78.27	17	28.32	18	49.95

=== Pairs ===
Rank	Name	Section	Total points	SP		FS	
1	Rachael Dobson / Alexander Sheldrick	WO	100.72	2	34.00	1	66.72
2	Judith Murtha-Anderson / Trennt Michaud	EO	98.16	1	34.98	2	63.18
3	Taylor LeClaire / Christopher Mostert	AB/NT/NU	92.60	3	30.33	3	62.27
4	Kendra Digness / Eric Thiessen	AB/NT/NU	85.34	7	27.33	4	58.01
5	Robyn-Lynn McGrath / Matthew Power	NL	84.11	6	27.95	5	56.16
6	Renata Wong / Henry Su	WO	83.80	5	29.29	6	54.51
7	Sarah-Jade Latulippe / Alex Leak	QC	82.87	4	29.74	7	53.13
8	Sabrina Vigneault / Cedric Savard	QC	71.28	8	24.65	8	46.63

=== Ice dancing ===
Rank	Name	Section	Total points	PD1		PD2		FD	
1	Danielle Wu / Spencer Soo	BC/YT	96.47	1	15.07	2	14.99	1	66.41
2	Brianna Delmaestro / Graeme Gordon	BC/YT	88.48	6	12.86	1	15.16	3	60.46
3	Alexa Linden / Tyler Miller	BC/YT	88.13	5	13.17	4	14.39	2	60.57
4	Jaimie Clarke / Matthew Webb	NS	81.44	3	13.45	3	14.77	6	53.22
5	Christina Carreira / Simon-Pierre Malette-Paquette	QC	80.91	11	10.51	8	13.59	4	56.81
6	Abigail Seewald / Jared Fell	AB/NT/NU	77.75	4	13.36	5	14.24	10	50.15
7	Catherine Daigle-Roy / Alexis St-Louis	QC	77.51	2	13.99	9	12.96	9	50.56
8	Marie-Jade Lauriault / Pierre-Richard Chiasson	QC	75.22	7	12.37	11	11.88	8	50.97
9	Andie-Lynn Gingrich / Liam Kinrade	BC/YT	75.08	9	11.09	6	14.03	11	49.96
10	Valérie Taillefer / Jason Chan	QC	75.06	12	9.80	7	13.90	7	51.36
11	Ekaterina Fedyushchenko / Jean-Luc Jackson	WO	72.63	13	8.78	15	10.20	5	53.65
12	Emily Valentine / Simon Desrochers	QC	67.61	8	11.10	10	12.66	12	43.85
13	Caroline Falardeau / Simon Dazé	QC	63.03	14	8.55	13	11.04	13	43.44
14	Camille Mondor / Stefan Dyck	QC	60.85	15	7.62	14	10.55	14	42.68
15	Jocelyn Leblanc / Wyatt Cowell	SK	60.22	10	10.71	12	11.42	15	38.09

== International team selections ==
=== Four Continents Championships ===
Skate Canada announced the Canadian team to the 2013 Four Continents Championships on January 20, 2013:

	Men	Ladies	Pairs	Ice dancing
1	Kevin Reynolds	Kaetlyn Osmond	Meagan Duhamel / Eric Radford	Tessa Virtue / Scott Moir
2	Andrei Rogozine	Amélie Lacoste	Kirsten Moore-Towers / Dylan Moscovitch	Piper Gilles / Paul Poirier
3	Elladj Baldé	Julianne Séguin	Paige Lawrence / Rudi Swiegers	Nicole Orford / Thomas Williams

=== World Junior Championships ===
Skate Canada announced the Canadian team to the 2013 World Junior Championships on January 20, 2013:

	Men	Ladies	Pairs	Ice dancing
1	Nam Nguyen	Gabrielle Daleman	Brittany Jones / Ian Beharry	Madeline Edwards / Zhao Kai Pang
2	Mitchell Gordon	Alaine Chartrand	Margaret Purdy / Michael Marinaro	Mackenzie Bent / Garrett MacKeen
3			Hayleigh Bell / Alistair Sylvester	

=== World Championships ===
Skate Canada announced part of the Canadian team to the 2013 World Championships on January 21, 2013, leaving the third men's and ice dancing spots to be determined following Four Continents Championships. In February, 2013, Skate Canada announced that Andrei Rogozine took the third men's spot and Kaitlyn Weaver and Andrew Poje took the third ice dancing spot of the Canadian world team roster.

	Men	Ladies	Pairs	Ice dancing
1	Patrick Chan	Kaetlyn Osmond	Meagan Duhamel / Eric Radford	Tessa Virtue / Scott Moir
2	Kevin Reynolds		Kirsten Moore-Towers / Dylan Moscovitch	Piper Gilles / Paul Poirier
3	Andrei Rogozine			Kaitlyn Weaver / Andrew Poje

=== World Team Trophy ===
Skate Canada announced part of the Canadian team to the 2013 World Team Trophy on March 26, 2013.

	Men	Ladies	Pairs	Ice dancing
1	Patrick Chan	Kaetlyn Osmond	Meagan Duhamel / Eric Radford	Kaitlyn Weaver / Andrew Poje
2	Kevin Reynolds	Gabrielle Daleman		
