= Shawn Sawyer =

Canadian figure skater

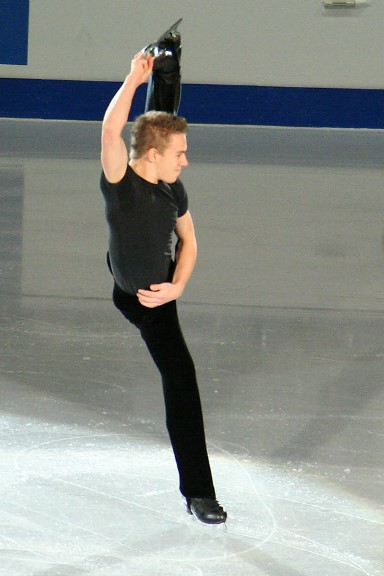
- Sawyer in 2006

Personal information
- Born: January 14, 1985 (age 41) Edmundston, New Brunswick, Canada
- Home town: Sainte-Julie, Quebec
- Height: 1.64 m (5 ft 4 1/2 in)

Figure skating career
- Country: Canada
- Discipline: Men's singles
- Began skating: 1994
- Retired: April 1, 2011
Canadian Championships
Silver medal – second place	2011 Victoria	Singles
Bronze medal – third place	2005 London	Singles
Bronze medal – third place	2006 Ottawa	Singles
Bronze medal – third place	2008 Vancouver	Singles

Shawn Sawyer (born January 14, 1985, in Edmundston, New Brunswick) is a Canadian former competitive figure skater. He is the 2011 Canadian national silver medallist and a three-time (2005-2006 & 2008) Canadian national bronze medallist. He represented Canada in the 2006 Winter Olympics in Turin, Italy finishing 12th overall. Unlike most skaters, Sawyer is a clockwise spinner.

== Personal life ==
Shawn Sawyer was born in Edmundston, New Brunswick. Sawyer started performing with Cirque du Soleil in “Crystal” in 2017. The 42nd Cirque du Soleil production is directed by Shana Carroll and Sebastien Soldevila.

== Career ==
=== Early career ===
He started skating at age nine. Even as a young skater, he was known for his artistry and his spirals. This attracted the attention of Olympic bronze medallist Toller Cranston. Cranston was about to retire from show skating and he envisioned a final tribute show in which he and other skaters passed down their knowledge of skating and life lessons to a young skater. This skater was Shawn Sawyer.

In 1999, Sawyer won the bronze medal on the novice level at the Canada Winter Games, skating with a bad cold. The following year, he won the national novice title. He skated on the Junior Grand Prix the following season and won the bronze medal at his first event. His fifth-place finish at his second event prevented him from qualifying for the JGP Final. At Nationals, he placed 4th in the junior level. On the JGP the following season, he qualified for the Junior Grand Prix Final, where he placed fifth, and then won the national Junior title. This earned him a trip to the 2002 Junior Worlds, where he placed 11th after performing an entirely new long program.

Sawyer, already very flexible, had been working on a Biellmann spin. As a junior skater, Sawyer trained at the Minto Skating Club in Ottawa under coach Alexei Tchetveroukin. He had been training the Biellmann since learning in New Brunswick at age twelve, and he performed it in exhibition at Nationals in 2002 after winning the junior title.

Later, Sawyer changed coaches to Gordon Forbes. In his third season as a junior internationally, he won his second JGP event, but an 8th-place finish prevented him from returning to the Final. In his senior debut at Nationals, he placed 6th, a promising finish, and then repeated that placement at the World Junior Championships.

The 2003–2004 season would be Sawyer's last as a junior. He dropped to ninth place at nationals and tenth at Junior Worlds. Sawyer then went senior internationally. Following this season, he changed coaches to Annie Barabe and Sophie Richard and moved to Drummondville, Quebec.

=== Senior career ===
At the 2004 Cup of Russia, Sawyer's first senior international event, he placed just off the podium. He placed ninth at the 2004 NHK Trophy. At nationals, he won the bronze medal, earning him a trip to the 2005 Four Continents. His podium finish did not earn him a spot to Worlds because Canada had only two spots to the 2005 World Championships.

In the 2005–2006 season, the Olympic season, Sawyer placed in the middle of the fields in his two Grand Prix events. But he held on to the bronze position at Nationals, earning him a spot to the Olympics and to Worlds. He placed 12th at the Olympics and 21st at Worlds, held in Calgary.

In the 2006–2007 season, Sawyer placed just off the podium at the Skate Canada competition. Sawyer then placed 8th at the Grand Prix event in Paris. At Nationals, he was ahead after the short program, but a charismatic comeback performance by Emanuel Sandhu pushed Sawyer down to 4th, depriving him of a spot to Four Continents and Worlds.

In the 2007–2008 season, Sawyer placed 7th at his first event, the 2007 Cup of China. At his second event, the 2007 NHK Trophy, he placed 9th. At the 2008 Canadian Championships, he won his third bronze medal at that competition. This earned him a trip to the 2008 Four Continents, where he placed 9th.

The 2008–2009 season started off with two back to back competitions for Sawyer. He opened the season at 2008 Skate America where he placed fifth and then continued to 2008 Skate Canada International where he again placed fifth. Even though his overall placement was fifth, he did win the free skate with a score of 142.36.

In 2009–2010, Sawyer was awarded the silver medal at Skate America, but placed fourth at Canadian Nationals, narrowly missing a trip to the 2010 Olympic Games by two spots.

In 2010–2011, he won the silver at the 2011 Canadian Championships and was named to the team for the World Championships. After the Japan earthquake, the event was postponed by a month and now coincided with his commitment to Stars on Ice. Sawyer decided to withdraw from the World Championships and was replaced by Kevin Reynolds. He decided to end his competitive career. He continued to perform in ice shows, such as Art on Ice.

== Signature moves ==
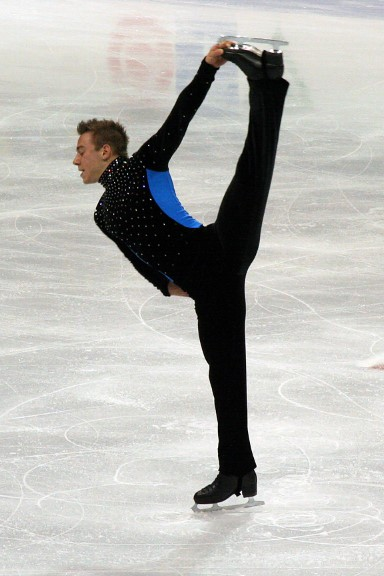
Sawyer performs a Y-spin in competition

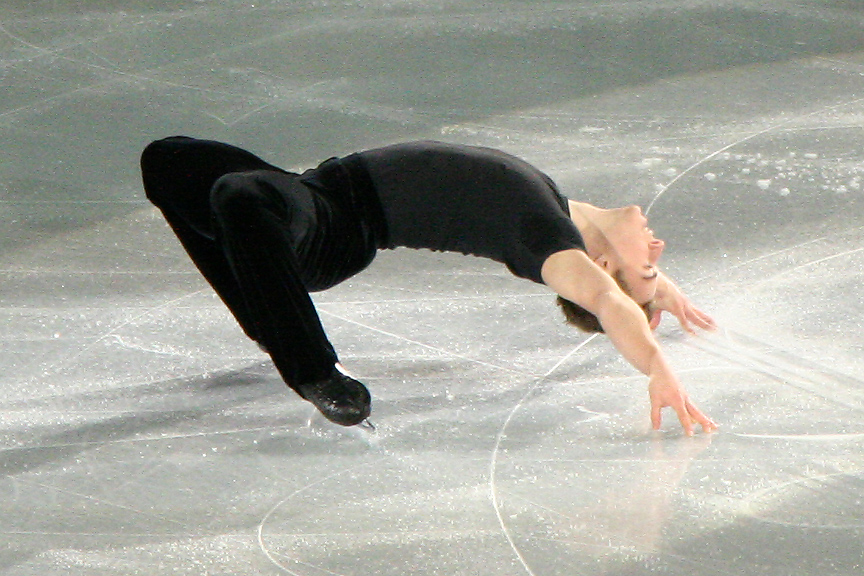
Sawyer performs a cantilever in exhibition

Sawyer was well known for his spins and his spiral positions, which show great flexibility. Sawyer was one of few male skaters to perform spirals in their programs, because men did not receive any credit for spiral sequences. Sawyer's arabesque, I and Y positions in spins and spirals were his trademark moves.

== Programs ==
Season	Short program	Free skating	Exhibition
2010–2011	Assassin's Tango by John Powell	Alice in Wonderland by Danny Elfman	Working for the Weekend by Loverboy choreo. by Shawn Sawyer, Jeffrey Buttle, Marie-France Dubreuil, Patrice Lauzon; Uprising by Muse
2009–2010	Assassin's Tango by John Powell	Amadeus by Wolfgang Amadeus Mozart	
2008–2009	Another Brick in the Wall by Pink Floyd performed by the London Philharmonic Orchestra	Amadeus by Wolfgang Amadeus Mozart	
2007–2008	Another Brick in the Wall by Pink Floyd performed by the London Philharmonic Orchestra	Moments in Love by Art of Noise	Tainted Love Untitled by Sum 41
2006–2007	Tune in Tomorrow by Wynton Marsalis	Moments in Love by Art of Noise	It's My Life by Bon Jovi; Home by Michael Bublé
2005–2006	Libertango	Warsaw Concerto	It's My Life by Bon Jovi
2004–2005	Libertango	Cirque du Soleil	
2003–2004	Into The Night	Cello Concerto	Save Yourself; Sweet Dreams
2001–2003	Irma by René Dupéré	Spartacus	How Much Is the Fish?

== Competitive highlights ==
- GP – Event of the ISU Grand Prix Series
- JGP – Event of the ISU Junior Grand Prix Series

Competition placements at senior level
Season	2002–03	2003–04	2004–05	2005–06	2006–07	2007–08	2008–09	2009–10	2010–11
Winter Olympics				12th					
World Championships				21st					
Four Continents Championships			6th			9th		7th	10th
Canadian Championships	6th	9th	3rd	3rd	4th	3rd	5th	4th	2nd
GP Cup of China						7th			
GP Cup of Russia			4th	7th				8th	
GP NHK Trophy			9th			9th			5th
GP Skate America							5th	2nd	8th
GP Skate Canada				6th	4th		5th		
GP Trophée Éric Bompard					8th				

Competition placements at junior level
Season	2000–01	2001–02	2002–03	2003–04
World Junior Championships		11th	6th	10th
Canadian Championships	4th	1st		
Junior Grand Prix Final		5th		
JGP Bulgaria		1st		3rd
JGP Canada			8th	
JGP China	5th			
JGP Japan		3rd		
JGP Mexico	3rd			
JGP Serbia			1st	
JGP Slovenia				3rd

== Detailed results ==
ISU personal best scores in the +3/-3 GOE System
Segment	Type	Score	Event
Total	TSS	206.56	2008 Skate Canada International
Short program	TSS	70.15	2010 NHK Trophy
Short program	TES	36.58	2010 NHK Trophy
Short program	PCS	34.13	2011 Four Continents Championships
Free skating	TSS	143.98	2010 Four Continents Championships
Free skating	TES	75.16	2008 Skate Canada International
Free skating	PCS	69.60	2010 Four Continents Championships
