= Alexandra Paul (figure skater) =

Canadian ice dancer (1991–2023)

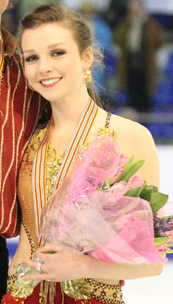
- Paul at the 2010 Junior Worlds

Personal information
- Full name: Alexandra Jane Paul
- Born: September 16, 1991 Toronto, Canada
- Died: August 22, 2023 (aged 31) Melancthon Township, Ontario, Canada
- Home town: Midhurst, Ontario
- Height: 1.61 m (5 ft 3 in)
- Spouse: Mitchell Islam (m. 2021)

Figure skating career
- Country: Canada
- Coach: Marie-France Dubreuil; Patrice Lauzon; Romain Haguenauer; Pasquale Camerlengo; Anjelika Krylova; David Islam; Kelly Johnson; Pavol Porac; Tyler Myles
- Skating club: Barrie ON; Gadbois Centre; Detroit Skating Club
- Began skating: 1996
- Retired: December 15, 2016
Medal record
Figure skating: Ice dancing
Representing Canada
World Junior Championships
Silver medal – second place	2010 The Hague	Ice dancing

Alexandra Jane Paul (September 16, 1991 – August 22, 2023) was a Canadian competitive ice dancer. With her skating partner and eventual husband, Mitchell Islam, she won the silver medal at the 2010 World Junior Championships. In their senior career, Paul and Islam were the 2013 Nebelhorn Trophy bronze medalists, three-time Canadian national bronze medalists (2011, 2014–2015), and represented their country at the 2014 Winter Olympics.

== Career ==
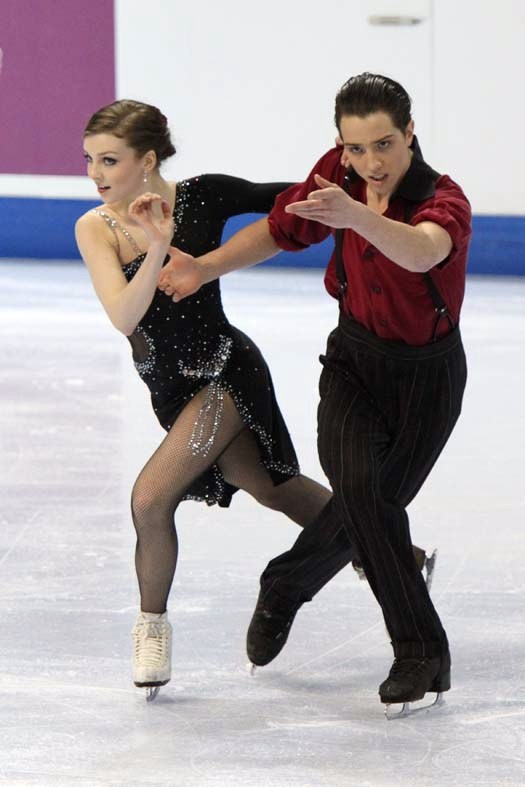
Paul and Islam at the 2011 Canadian Championships

Alexandra Paul finished third with Jason Cheperdak in junior ice dancing at the 2009 Canadian Championships. She then began looking for a new partner and had a successful tryout in February 2009 with Mitchell Islam, a fellow skater at the Mariposa School of Skating in Barrie, Ontario.

Paul and Islam began competing together during the 2009–2010 season. In July 2009, they beat the Canadian junior champions at the Minto Summer Skate and were given a Junior Grand Prix assignment. They competed at two 2009–10 Junior Grand Prix events, finishing fourth in Poland and fifth in Turkey. They won gold at the Canadian Junior Championships and were assigned to Junior Worlds where they captured the silver medal.

Paul and Islam moved up to the senior ranks for the 2010–2011 season. They finished fourth in their senior Grand Prix debut at 2010 Skate Canada International. Their next event was 2010 Cup of Russia. They had a fall in the short dance and withdrew from the free dance after Paul sustained a rib injury. They made their senior national debut at the 2011 Canadian Championships, finishing in third. They were first alternates for the 2011 World Championships.

Paul sprained a knee ligament around 2011 or 2012.

Paul and Islam finished eighth at the 2011 Skate America. They withdrew before the free dance at 2011 NHK Trophy after placing seventh in the short—Paul suffered a cut to the back of the thigh in a collision with Italy's Lorenza Alessandrini and Simone Vaturi during the morning practice on November 12.

In June 2012, Paul and Islam decided to train full-time at the Detroit Skating Club in Bloomfield Hills, Michigan. They had no Grand Prix events in 2012. At the 2013 Canadian Championships, they finished fourth.

Paul/Islam began the following season with bronze at the 2013 Nebelhorn Trophy. They placed fifth at their sole Grand Prix assignment, the 2013 Skate Canada International. After winning the bronze medal at the 2014 Canadian Championships, they were assigned to the 2014 Winter Olympics in Sochi, where they placed 18th.

Paul/Islam ranked 8th in the short dance, 14th in the free dance, and 13th overall at the 2015 World Championships in Shanghai, China. A few weeks later, they changed coaches, joining Marie-France Dubreuil, Patrice Lauzon, and Romain Haguenauer at the Gadbois Centre in Montreal, Quebec.

Paul injured her hamstring in the summer of 2016. She and Islam received the bronze medal at the 2016 CS U.S. International Classic. On November 18, Paul twisted her knee when she fell during a morning practice at the 2016 Cup of China. The duo decided to withdraw from the competition before the short dance. They announced their competitive retirement on December 15, 2016.

== Personal life and death ==
Alexandra Paul was born on September 16, 1991, in Toronto. She had two sisters. Her father is a radiologist. She studied political science at Oakland University, completing her final semester in April 2017. She earned her Juris Doctor degree at the University of Windsor law school in 2020, and started a career as an associate lawyer with the firm Barriston Law in 2021.

Paul and Islam married in September 2021. She gave birth to their son, Charles, in October 2022. On August 22, 2023, Paul was killed when her car was hit by a transport truck. Paul was with her baby when the transport truck drove at 107 km/h (66 mph) into a well marked 60 km/h (37 mph) construction zone on Country Road 124 in Melancthon Township and crashed into a lineup of stopped cars. The baby was taken to a hospital with non-life-threatening injuries.

Tribute was paid to Paul at the 2023 Skate Canada International, where all the flower girls were dressed in versions of her 2014 Olympic free dance costume.

In February 2026, truck driver Sukhwinder Sidhu pleaded guilty to dangerous driving causing death and dangerous driving causing bodily harm; in May 2026, he was sentenced to 2.5 years in prison, as well as a seven-year driving ban.

== Programs ==
(with Mitchell Islam)

Season	Short dance	Free dance	Exhibition
2016–2017	Big Spender; Sing, Sing, Sing (with a Swing) choreo. by Romain Haguenauer	Liebestraum No. 3 in A flat; Hungarian Rhapsody No. 2 in C sharp minor; Concerto Paraphrase on "Rigoletto" by Franz Liszt	Thinking Out Loud by Ed Sheeran choreo. by Kelly Johnson
2015–2016	The Tales of Beatrix Potter by John Lanchbery choreo. by Romain Haguenauer	Where Is It Written? by Barbra Streisand choreo. by Marie-France Dubreuil, Patrice Lauzon	Love's Divine by Seal
2014–2015	Nocturno by Guido Luciani; Farruca Y Rumba by Pepe Romero choreo. by Pasquale Camerlengo, Anjelika Krylova	In Your Eyes by Peter Gabriel choreo. by Jeffrey Buttle, Kelly Johnson, David Islam; Come Rain or Come Shine by Frank Sinatra and Gloria Estefan; The Way You Look Tonight by Frank Sinatra choreo. by Marie-France Dubreuil, Patrice Lauzon	I Wanna Be Loved by You by Sinéad O'Connor
2013–2014	Crazy For You Overture by George Gershwin	Going Somewhere; I Will Follow You; Satin Birds; Dance for Me Wallis all by Abel Korzeniowski	In Your Eyes (New Blood edition) by Peter Gabriel choreo. by Jeffrey Buttle
2012–2013	La Foule; Milord by Édith Piaf choreo. by Kelly Johnson	The Crisis; 1900s Madness #1; Danny's Blues by Ennio Morricone; 12th Street Rag by Euday L. Bowman; Playing Love (from The Legend of 1900) by Ennio Morricone choreo. by Anjelika Krylova, Pasquale Camerlengo	In Your Eyes (New Blood edition) by Peter Gabriel choreo. by Jeffrey Buttle; Get Here by Rüdiger Skoczowsky
2011–2012	Main theme from 2046; Havana Slide by Jon Cohen choreo. by Romain Haguenauer	Tonight by Elton John choreo. by Kelly Johnson, David Wilson	In Your Eyes (New Blood edition) by Peter Gabriel choreo. by Jeffrey Buttle
2010–2011	La cumparsita – Amor por el Tango by G. M. Rodriguez; A los Amigos by A. Ponder choreographed by Pavol Porac	As Time Goes By by Herman Hupfeld choreo. by Marie-France Dubreuil, Patrice Lauzon	Oh! Darling by The Beatles cover by Dana Fuchs
	Original dance		
2009–2010	Nocturno by Guido Luciani; Farruca Y Rumba by Pepe Romero	Sheherazade by Cyril Martin; Moroccan Roll by Vanessa-Mae; Sometimes I Dream by Mario Frangoulis	Over the Rainbow by Eva Cassidy

== Competitive highlights ==
GP: Grand Prix; CS: Challenger Series; JGP: Junior Grand Prix

=== With Islam ===
International
Event	09–10	10–11	11–12	12–13	13–14	14–15	15–16	16–17
Olympics					18th			
Worlds					10th	13th		
Four Continents			6th			6th		
GP Cup of China						5th		WD
GP Bompard						6th		
GP NHK Trophy			WD				WD	
GP Rostel. Cup		WD						
GP Skate America			8th					
GP Skate Canada		4th			5th		6th	8th
CS Autumn Classic						4th		
CS Nebelhorn							2nd	
CS U.S. Classic								3rd
Nebelhorn				5th	3rd			
U.S. Classic				2nd				
International: Junior
Junior Worlds	2nd							
JGP Poland	4th							
JGP Turkey	5th							
National
Canadian Champ.	1st J	3rd	5th	4th	3rd	3rd	4th	
J = Junior level; WD = Withdrew

=== With Cheperdak ===
International
Event	2007–08	2008–09
JGP Spain		4th
JGP United Kingdom		6th
National
Canadian Champ.	3rd N	3rd J
Levels: N = Novice; J = Junior
