= Sébastien Wolfe =

Canadian figure skater

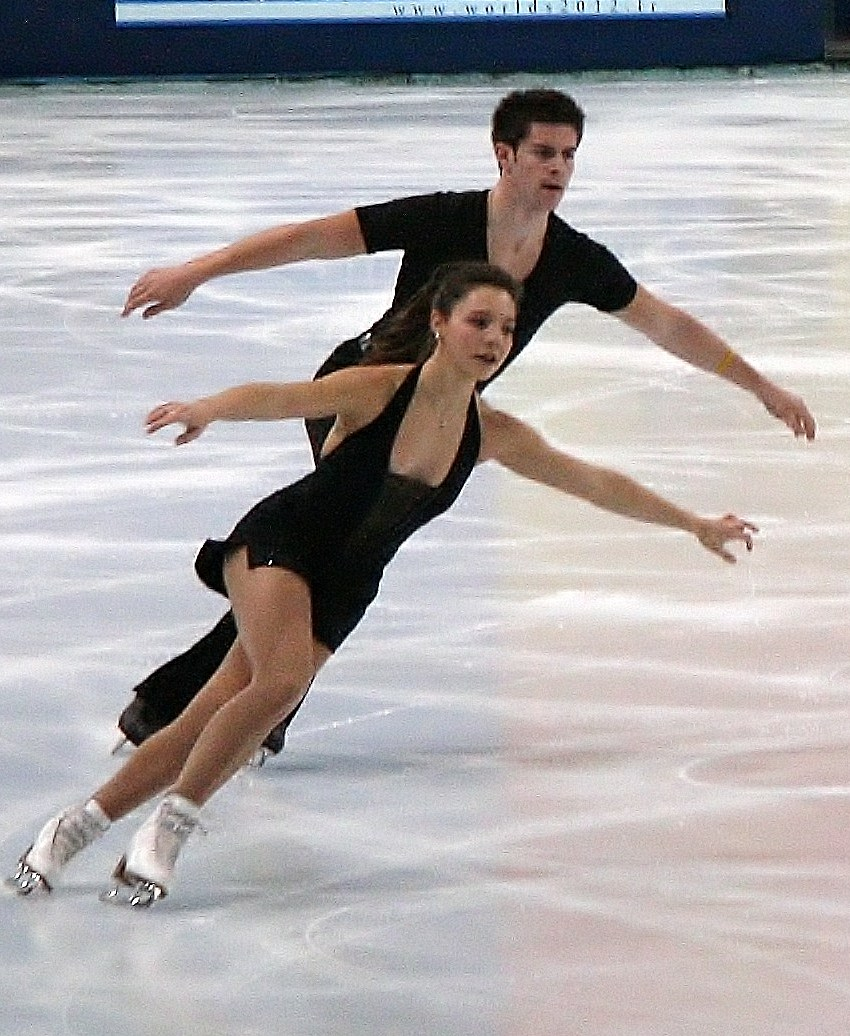

Personal information
- Born: February 1, 1990 (age 36) Montreal, Quebec
- Home town: Terrebonne, Quebec
- Height: 1.88 m (6 ft 2 in)

Figure skating career
- Country: Canada
- Skating club: CPA Rosemont, SC Montreal
- Began skating: 1993
- Retired: January 9, 2013

Sébastien Wolfe (born February 1, 1990) is a Canadian former pair skater. With Jessica Dubé, he is the 2012 Canadian national silver medalist and placed 12th at the 2012 World Championships.

== Career ==
Early in his pairs career, Wolfe competed with Tara Hancherow. They won junior silver medals at the 2010 and 2011 Canadian Championships.

On April 17, 2011, Jessica Dubé and Sébastien Wolfe announced they had formed a partnership. The pair made their competitive debut at the Liberty Summer competition in July, winning the free skate. They are coached by Annie Barabe and also work with John Zimmerman on pair elements. Dubé and Wolfe made their international debut together at the 2011 Nebelhorn Trophy, where they finished 6th. They competed at two Grand Prix events, 2011 Skate Canada International, where they finished 5th, and 2011 Trophee Eric Bompard, where they were 6th. Dubé and Wolfe won the silver medal at the 2012 Canadian Championships and were assigned to Four Continents and Worlds. At the 2012 Four Continents, they finished 8th.

In the 2012–2013 season, Dube and Wolfe were assigned two Grand Prix events, the 2012 Skate America and 2012 Rostelecom Cup, but withdrew from both. Dubé had an injury to her right foot which affected their training. After several months of consideration, Dubé and Wolfe announced on January 9, 2013, that they had both decided to retire from competition. Wolfe has completed his initial National Coaching Certification Program (NCCP) and also expressed interest in firefighting.

== Programs ==
=== With Dubé ===
Season	Short program	Free skating	Exhibition
2012–2013	Three Hours Past Midnight by James Collin	Legends of the Fall by James Horner	
2011–2012	Three Hours Past Midnight by James Collin	Heroes by Philip Glass: Sense of Doubt; Neuköln; VS Schneider	

== Competitive highlights ==
=== Pairs with Dubé ===
Results
International
Event	2011–12	2012–13
World Championships	12th	
Four Continents Champ.	8th	
GP Rostelecom Cup		WD
GP Skate America		WD
GP Skate Canada	6th	
GP Trophée Bompard	5th	
Nebelhorn Trophy	6th	
National
Canadian Champ.	2nd	WD
GP = Grand Prix; WD = Withdrew

=== Pairs with Hancherow ===
Results
National
Event	2010	2011
Canadian Championships	2nd J.	2nd J.
J. = Junior level

=== Singles career ===
Event	2007	2008	2009	2010
Canadian Championships	11th J.	8th J.	3rd J.	8th
J. = Junior level
