= Mitchell Gordon =

Canadian figure skater

Personal information
- Born: June 12, 1996 (age 30) Vancouver, British Columbia
- Home town: Vancouver, British Columbia
- Height: 1.76 m (5 ft 9 1/2 in)

Figure skating career
- Country: Canada
- Coach: Keegan Murphy; Eileen Murphy; Christine Goodall; George Yuhas
- Skating club: Connaught SC Richmond
- Began skating: 1999
- Retired: 2017

Mitchell Gordon (born June 12, 1996) is a Canadian former competitive figure skater. He won the junior men's title at the 2012 Canadian Championships and qualified for the final segment at the 2013 World Junior Championships, where he finished 16th. He represented the Connaught Skating Club in Richmond, British Columbia. His coaches included Joanne McLeod, Neil Wilson, Eileen Murphy, and Keegan Murphy.

== Programs ==
Season	Short program	Free skating
2014–2015	Russian Sailor Dance (from The Red Poppy) by Reinhold Glière	Beasts of the Southern Wild by Dan Romer, Benh Zeitlin
2013–2014	Russian Sailor Dance (from The Red Poppy) by Reinhold Glière	Far and Away by John Williams
2012–2013	The Untouchables by Ennio Morricone	Forever in Blue Jeans; Play Me; Sweet Caroline by Neil Diamond
2011–2012	Hipbrass by Bart & Baker	Keating's Triumph (from Dead Poets Society) by Maurice Jarre
2010–2011		Music by Aaron Copland

== Competitive highlights ==
CS: Challenger Series; JGP: Junior Grand Prix

International
Event	11–12	12–13	13–14	14–15	15–16	16–17
CS U.S. Classic						9th
Autumn Classic					8th	
International: Junior
Junior Worlds		16th				
JGP Austria		8th				
JGP Croatia		12th				
JGP Czech Rep.			11th			
JGP Estonia	7th					
JGP Germany				10th		
JGP Slovenia				7th		
National
Canadian Champ.	1st J	7th	11th	8th	13th	10th
