= Alistair Sylvester =

Canadian pair skater (born 1994)

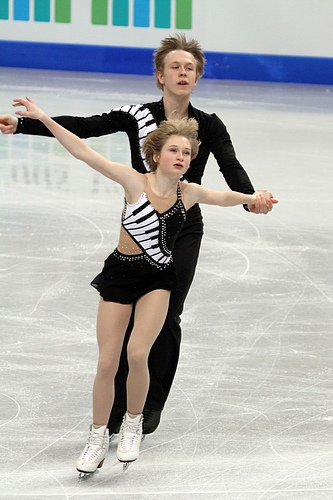
- Bell/Sylvester at the 2012 World Junior Championships

Personal information
- Born: October 29, 1994 (age 31) Modesto, California, U.S.
- Home town: Stratford, Ontario, Canada
- Height: 1.81 m (5 ft 11 1/2 in)

Figure skating career
- Country: Canada
- Coach: Lee Barkell
- Skating club: Mariposa School of Skating
- Began skating: 2000

Alistair Sylvester (born October 29, 1994) is a Canadian pair skater. He competed at two World Junior Championships with Hayleigh Bell.

== Career ==
Sylvester and Hayleigh Bell teamed up around 2009 and were coached by Lee Barkell at the Allandale Recreation Centre in Barrie, Ontario. After winning the novice title at the 2012 Canadian Championships, the pair was named in Canada's team to the 2012 World Junior Championships in Minsk, Belarus. They placed 12th in the short program, 9th in the free skate, and 12th overall.

The following season, Bell/Sylvester received their first ISU Junior Grand Prix assignments; they placed 7th in Austria and 6th in Croatia. Having won the junior title at the 2013 Canadian Championships, they were sent to Milan, Italy to compete at the 2013 World Junior Championships. They finished 11th after placing 14th in the short and 10th in the free.

== Programs ==
(with Bell)

Season	Short program	Free skating
2012–2013	Charleston by Cecil Mack choreo. by Kelly Johnson	Fantasie Impromptu by Frédéric Chopin choreo. by Kelly Johnson, Tyler Myles
2011–2012	Nut Rocker by Trans-Siberian Orchestra	Liebestraum by Franz Liszt

== Competitive highlights ==
(with Bell)

International
Event	2011–12	2012–13
World Junior Champ.	12th	11th
JGP Austria		7th
JGP Croatia		6th
National
Canadian Championships	1st N.	1st. J.
Levels: N. = Novice, J. = Junior
