= Cynthia Phaneuf =

Canadian figure skater

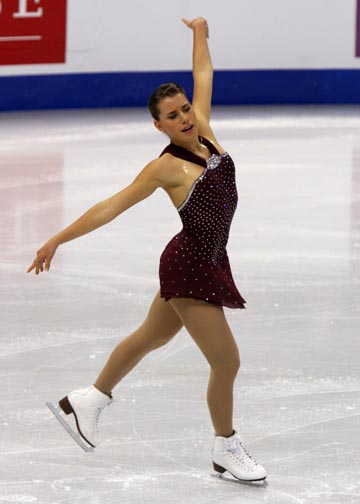
- Phaneuf at the 2008 Skate Canada.

Personal information
- Born: January 16, 1988 (age 38) Sorel-Tracy, Quebec
- Height: 1.70 m (5 ft 7 in)
- Spouse: Maxime Talbot (2014- )

Figure skating career
- Country: Canada
- Began skating: 1992
- Retired: September 26, 2012
Medal record
Figure skating: Ladies' singles
Representing Canada
Four Continents
Silver medal – second place	2004 Gangneung	Ladies' singles
World Team Trophy
Silver medal – second place	2009 Tokyo	Team
Bronze medal – third place	2012 Tokyo	Team

Cynthia Phaneuf (born January 16, 1988) is a Canadian former competitive figure skater. She is the 2004 Four Continents silver medallist, 2004 Skate Canada International champion, 2004 Skate America silver medallist, a two-time (2004, 2011) Canadian national champion, and a four-time (2005, 2009, 2010, 2012) Canadian silver medallist. She finished in fifth place at the 2010 World Championships and represented Canada at the 2010 Winter Olympics.

== Career ==
Cynthia Phaneuf began skating at age four after watching her cousin skating. She landed her first triple, a salchow, at the age of eleven.

Phaneuf was coached by Annie Barabé and Sophie Richard in Contrecœur, Quebec from the age of nine until November 2011. Her programs were choreographed by David Wilson. In domestic Canadian competitions, she represented CPA Sorel.

Phaneuf withdrew from the 2005 Skate Canada International due to a minor stress fracture in her right ankle. Considered a threat to qualify for the 2006 Canadian Olympic team due to her two previous national medals, she was forced to withdraw from the 2006 Canadian Championships (the Olympic qualifying competition) due to an injury to her right knee. In 2007, she earned a spot on the Canadian ladies' world team by finishing fourth in that year's national championships.

In 2008, she continued her comeback with a third place showing in the national championships, and a seventh place at the Four Continents Championships.

In 2010, at the World Championships, she placed fifth. She was 4th in the free program and 8th in the short program. Had she scored 1.09 more points, she would have won a bronze medal.

During the 2010–11 season, she placed fourth in her two Grand Prix events. At the 2011 Canadian Championships, she won her second national title.

In November 2011, Phaneuf left Quebec and longtime coaches Annie Barabé and Sophie Richard to move to Toronto to train with Brian Orser. Phaneuf won the silver medal at the 2012 Canadian Championships, second to Amelie Lacoste by 1.57 points. At the 2012 Four Continents, the two skaters competed for a berth to the 2012 World Championships – Phaneuf finished 0.18 points behind Lacoste.

In July 2012, it was reported that Phaneuf had a stress fracture in her back. On September 26, 2012, Phaneuf announced her retirement from competitive skating. She stated, "I've done everything I wanted to. [...] I'm ready to move on."

== Personal life ==
Phaneuf met hockey player Maxime Talbot in Montreal, where they shared the same massage therapist, and they began dating in 2012. Following her retirement from skating, Phaneuf moved to Philadelphia, where Talbot was playing for the NHL, and she began coaching at Isabelle Brasseur's skating school there. After Talbot was traded to the Colorado Avalanche in October 2013, Phaneuf moved with him to Denver, Colorado. Phaneuf and Talbot married on July 11, 2014. They have three children, as of 2019. Phaneuf is a fourth cousin of Canadian ice hockey player Dion Phaneuf.

== Programs ==
Season	Short program	Free skating	Exhibition
2010–12	Unbreak My Heart/Spanish Guitar; Bordao en oro; Afternoon at Satie's by Jesse Cook by Jesse Cook	Rhapsody on a Theme of Paganini by Sergei Rachmaninoff	Je l'aime à mourir by Francis Cabrel performed by Shakira; Barracuda by Heart
2008–10	Nocturne by Claude Debussy performed by Aaron Rosand	Mission Cleopatra by Philippe Chany	Sweet Dreams
2006–08	You Are So Beautiful by Bruce Fisher, Billy Preston performed by Karl Hugo	Clair De Lune Claude Debussy	
2004–05	Songs My Mother Taught Me by Antonín Dvořák	Capriccio Espagnol by Nikolai Rimsky-Korsakov	
2002–04	The Promise by Rolf Løvland performed by Secret Garden	Quelques Jeux Interdits by Francois Dompienne	I'm With You by Avril Lavigne
2001–02	Theme from Sabrina by John Williams	Heart Still Beating by Ottmar Liebert; Vamos a Bailar by Gypsy Kings; Casi un Bolero by Robi Rosa, Luis Gómez-Escolar	

== Competitive highlights ==
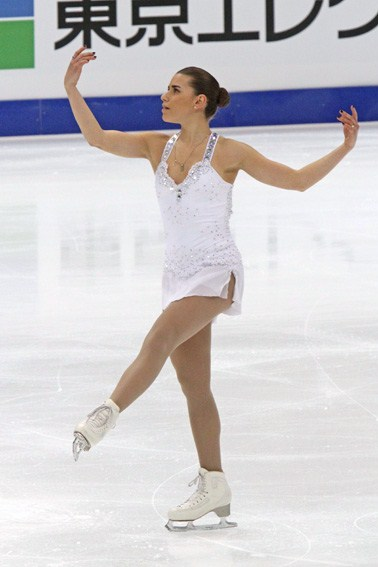
Phaneuf at the 2011 Four Continents

GP: Grand Prix; JGP: Junior Grand Prix

International
Event	00–01	01–02	02–03	03–04	04–05	06–07	07–08	08–09	09–10	10–11	11–12
Olympics									12th		
Worlds					20th			15th	5th	13th	
Four Continents				2nd		15th	7th	5th		6th	8th
GP Final					6th						
GP Skate Canada					1st		10th	8th	7th	4th	7th
GP Bompard										4th	
GP NHK Trophy								7th	6th		9th
GP Skate America					2nd						
Nebelhorn Trophy					4th						
International: Junior, Novice
Junior Worlds				10th							
JGP Final		7th									
JGP Bulgaria				3rd							
JGP Canada			3rd								
JGP Germany			6th								
JGP Japan		5th		5th							
JGP Netherlands		1st									
Mladost Trophy			1st J								
Triglav Trophy	2nd N										
National
Canadian Champ.	6th N	2nd J	7th	1st	2nd	4th	3rd	2nd	2nd	1st	2nd
Team events
World Team; Trophy								2nd T 7th P			3rd T 12th P
Japan Open										2nd T 3rd P	
Levels: N. = Novice; J. = Junior; T: Team result; P: Personal result. Medals awarded for team result only. Phaneuf missed the 2005–06 season due to injury.
