= Paige Lawrence =

Canadian pair skater

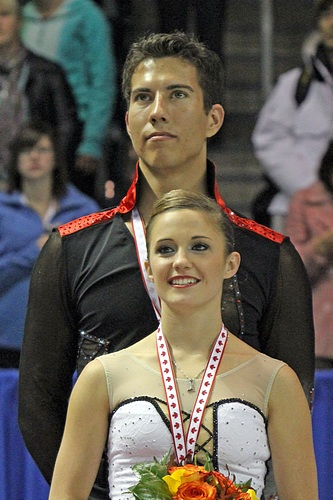
- Lawrence/Swiegers in 2010.

Personal information
- Born: February 22, 1990 (age 36) Kipling, Saskatchewan
- Home town: Kennedy, Saskatchewan
- Height: 1.52 m (5 ft 0 in)

Figure skating career
- Country: Canada
- Coach: Patricia Hole, Lyndon Johnston
- Skating club: Wawota FSC
- Began skating: 1994
- Retired: 2014
Medal record
Representing Canada
Figure skating: Pairs
Four Continents Championships
| Bronze medal – third place | 2011 Taipei | Pairs |
Canadian Championships
| Bronze medal – third place | 2011 Victoria | Pairs |
| Bronze medal – third place | 2012 Moncton | Pairs |
| Bronze medal – third place | 2013 Mississauga | Pairs |
| Bronze medal – third place | 2014 Ottawa | Pairs |

Paige Lawrence (born February 22, 1990) is a Canadian former competitive pair skater. With former partner Rudi Swiegers, she is the 2011 Four Continents bronze medallist and a four-time Canadian national bronze medallist (2011–14).

== Personal life ==
Lawrence was born in Kipling, Saskatchewan. She is the third of five children born to Jim, a professional bull rider, and Leanne Lawrence. Her parents owned a rodeo production company. Her father also played ice hockey and her mother enjoyed figure skating.

Lawrence competed in barrel racing in her youth. In 2009, she began studying part-time at Brandon University, majoring in kinesiology. After studying sports physiology at the University of Regina, she decided to do post-secondary studies at the University of Calgary. In 2018, she married professional bareback bronc rider, Richie Champion. They have two children and reside in Stevensville, Montana.

== Skating career ==
When Lawrence was four years old, her parents enrolled her in ice skating, one of few activities in their small town. In the summer of 2005, she began pair skating with Rudi Swiegers, who was seeking a partner who jumped in the same direction as him, a rarity at their club. Although Lawrence is right-handed, she is a clockwise jumper like Swiegers. Despite their coach's limited pairs experience and their rink's extreme cold, the pair did not wish to relocate.

Lawrence/Swiegers had a slow start in the junior ranks, placing 14th at Junior Nationals in 2006 and 2007. In 2008, however, they moved up to 2nd at the junior level and received several international assignments for the 2008–09 season. They were eighth and fifth at their two Junior Grand Prix assignments before finishing fourth at the 2009 World Junior Championships. They placed fourth on the senior level at Canadian Nationals.

In the 2009–10 season, the pair moved up to seniors. They were seventh at the 2009 NHK Trophy, their sole Grand Prix event. They dropped to sixth at Canadian Nationals, and received no further assignments for that season.

Lawrence/Swiegers started the 2010–11 season at the 2010 Skate Canada International, where they won their first international medal, a bronze. They followed this with a fifth-place finish at the 2010 Cup of Russia. At the 2011 Canadian Nationals, they made several mistakes in the long program to drop from second after the short program down to third place; however, this was their first podium finish at the event as seniors. Lawrence/Swiegers were named to the Canadian team for the 2011 Four Continents Championships; they finished second in the short program and fourth in free skating, setting personal bests in both segments, and won the bronze medal.

In late December 2011, Lawrence sustained a concussion in a training accident. The next month, the pair competed at the 2012 Canadian Championships, where they won their second national bronze medal.

Lawrence/Swiegers were named in Canada's team to the 2014 Winter Olympics in Sochi and finished 14th. The final event of their career was the 2014 World Championships in Saitama, Japan, where they placed 12th. Swiegers then decided to end their partnership. They announced their split on May 8, 2014.

== Programs ==
With Swiegers

| Season | Short program | Free skating | Exhibition |
|---|---|---|---|
| 2013–2014 | Olivier; I Put a Spell on You; Rudy's Bock | Oz the Great and Powerful by Danny Elfman | |
| 2012–2013 | Robin and Marian by John Barry | War Horse by John Williams | Black Velvet by Alannah Myles |
| 2011–2012 | Beetlejuice by Danny Elfman | D'Artagnan by Maxime Rodriguez; The Man in the Iron Mask by Nick Glennie-Smith; Nouvelle France by Patrick Doyle | |
| 2010–2011 | City Slickers by Marc Shaiman | Van Helsing by Alan Silvestri | |
| 2009–2010 | Baton Bunny by Milt Franklyn | Van Helsing by Alan Silvestri | |
| 2008–2009 | Orange Blossom Sorbet by Joe Trio | The Painted Veil by Alexandre Desplat | |

== Competitive highlights ==
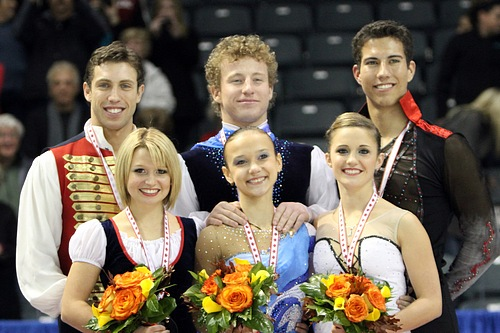
Lawrence/Swiegers with the other medallists at the 2010 Skate Canada

GP: Grand Prix; JGP: Junior Grand Prix

With Swiegers

International
| Event | 2005–06 | 2006–07 | 2007–08 | 2008–09 | 2009–10 | 2010–11 | 2011–12 | 2012–13 | 2013–14 |
|---|---|---|---|---|---|---|---|---|---|
| Olympics | | | | | | | | | 14th |
| Worlds | | | | | | | | | 12th |
| Four Continents | | | | | | 3rd | 7th | 6th | |
| GP NHK Trophy | | | | | 7th | | | | 6th |
| GP Rostelecom | | | | | | 5th | | 4th | |
| GP Skate Canada | | | | | | 3rd | 8th | 4th | 4th |
| Nebelhorn Trophy | | | | | | | 5th | | |
| U.S. Classic | | | | | | | | 2nd | 5th |
International: Junior
| Junior Worlds | | | | 4th | | | | | |
| JGP Belarus | | | | 8th | | | | | |
| JGP Germany | | | 4th | | | | | | |
| JGP U.K. | | | | 5th | | | | | |
National
| Canadian Champ. | 14th J. | 14th J. | 2nd J. | 4th | 6th | 3rd | 3rd | 3rd | 3rd |
| SC Challenge | | | | | | | 1st | | |
J. = Junior level
