= Elladj Baldé =

Canadian figure skater

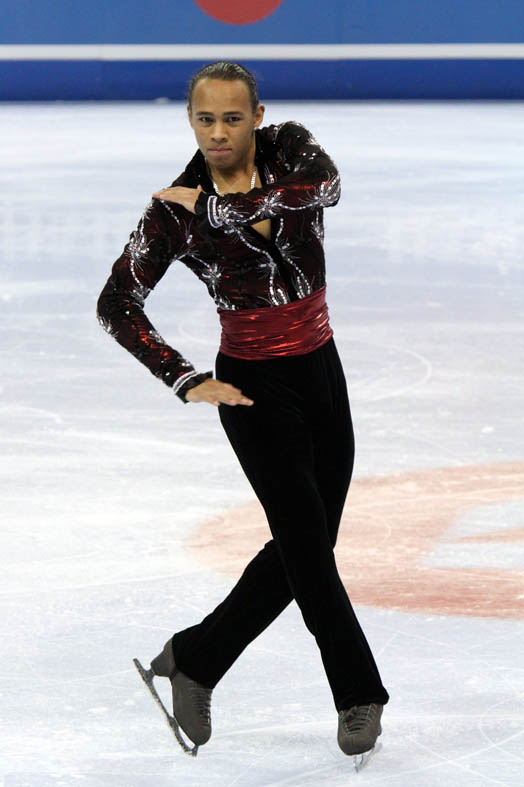
- Baldé in 2011

Personal information
- Born: November 9, 1990 (age 35) Moscow, Russian SFSR, Soviet Union
- Home town: Montreal, Quebec, Canada
- Height: 1.71 m (5 ft 7 1/2 in)

Figure skating career
- Country: Canada
- Coach: Bruno Marcotte
- Skating club: CPA Anjou Kinsmen
- Began skating: 1997
- Retired: May 4, 2018

Elladj Baldé (born November 9, 1990) is a Canadian former competitive figure skater. He won the 2015 Nebelhorn Trophy, an ISU Challenger Series event. He is the 2008 Canadian Junior champion.

== Personal life ==
Elladj Baldé was born November 9, 1990, in Moscow to a Russian mother and a Guinean father, Ibrahim, from the village of Tombon, near Labé. He has two younger sisters, Djoulia Baldé and Catherine Baldé, who also skated. His older sister, Djouldé, died from leukemia. After a year in Bonn, Germany during his sister's treatment, the family moved to Canada in 1992. He speaks English, French, and Russian. On March 18, 2020, he announced his engagement to Michelle Dawley, a dancer and choreographer from Calgary.

== Career ==
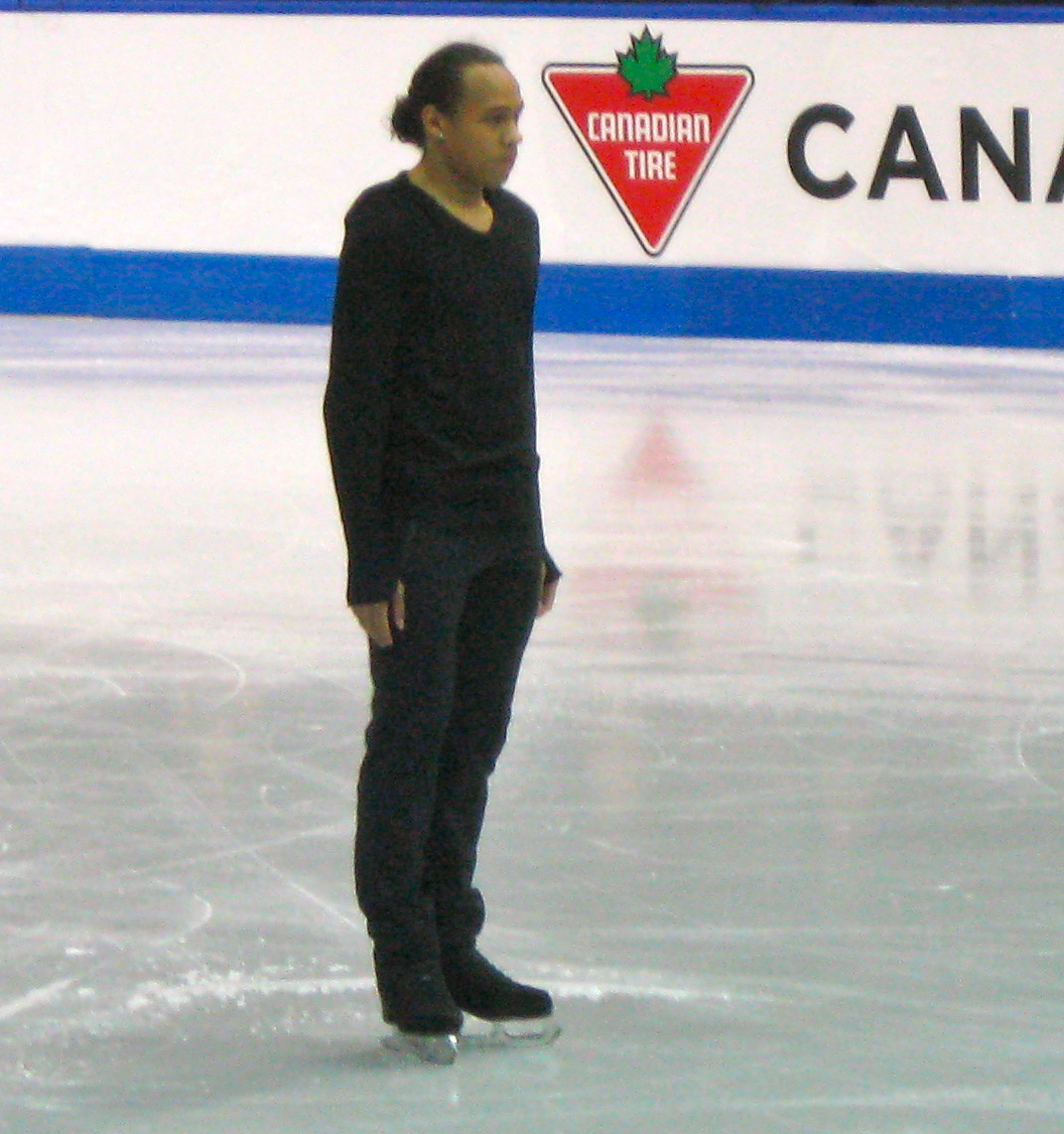
Baldé at the 2013 Canadian Championships

Elladj Baldé was introduced to skating at the age of seven by his mother. Though at first he would hide his skates in an attempt to avoid practice, he began to love skating when he was ten. He was sometimes discouraged by mocking of the sport. His parents also struggled with the expense of skating. In a 2021 interview, he said, "I was lucky that I grew up with coaches that understood our family’s situation and helped us out."

Baldé won the junior silver medal at the 2007 Canadian Championships and won the junior title at the 2008 Canadian Championships. During the 2008–09 season, he won a pair of medals on the ISU Junior Grand Prix series and made his senior national debut at the 2009 Canadian Championships, finishing 10th. Baldé was 8th at the 2009 World Junior Championships.

In 2009, Baldé underwent major surgery after tearing his anterior cruciate ligament (ACL) in his right knee, keeping him off the ice for six months. His doctor gave the go-ahead to resume practicing triples after three months of lighter training on the ice. He missed the entire 2009–10 season.

Baldé returned to competition the following season and placed 5th at the 2011 Canadian Championships. In late 2011, he moved to the United States to train with Yuka Sato and Jason Dungjen at the Detroit Skating Club in Bloomfield Hills, Michigan. He was 4th at the 2012 Canadian Championships.

After identifying a problem with the blade positioning on one of his new boots, Baldé decided to compete at the 2013 Skate Canada International with an older left boot and new right boot, even though one was soft and the other stiff. Both his knees were taped as a result of tendinitis. In the short program, he landed his first quad toe in competition and added a double toe to the end.

Baldé withdrew from the 2014 Skate Canada International on October 30, having sustained a concussion. He relocated to Montreal in or before July 2015, joining Bruno Marcotte and Manon Perron. He won an ISU Challenger Series event, the 2015 Nebelhorn Trophy, improving his personal best by 30 points.

In early September 2017, Baldé sustained his fifth concussion in three or four years. The 2018 Four Continents Championships was his last competition as an eligible figure skater. Skate Canada announced his retirement on May 4, 2018.

Baldé is a co-founder of the Figure Skating Diversity and Inclusion Alliance. He appeared as a choreographer in season 5 (2019) of Battle of the Blades and served as a judge in season 6. He is also active on social media.

== Programs ==
Season	Short program	Free skating	Exhibition
2007–2008	Lunatico by Gotan Project; Tanguera by Mariano Mores; Por una cabeza by Carlos Gardel	Freedom by Mei Li and Yin Yue Hui performed by 12 Girls Band; Drum solo from Oziem by Turku	
2008–2009	Freedom by Mei Li and Yin Yue Hui performed by 12 Girls Band; Drum Solo from Ozlem by Turku	Carmina Burana (modern arrangement) by Carl Orff	
2011–2012	Malagueña; Montana Skies; Futuro Flamenco; Girlfight	Dirty Diana; Billie Jean; Bad; They Don't Care About Us; Man in the Mirror by Michael Jackson	
2012–2013	Malagueña; Montana Skies; Futuro Flamenco; Girlfight	Moonlight Sonata Remix by Ludwig van Beethoven; Animal Rights by deadmau5, Wolfgang Gartner	
2013–2014	BoBom by Macklemore & Ryan Lewis	Shine On You Crazy Diamond by Pink Floyd	Move (If You Wanna) by Mims; Church by T-Pain; Wall to Wall by Chris Brown
2014–2015	It's a Man's Man's Man's World; I Got You (I Feel Good) by James Brown	Barrie San Miguel; Galicia Flamenca; Jumpin' Jack by Scotty Morris choreo. by Pasquale Camerlengo	
2015–2016	Echoes of Harlem by Duke Ellington performed by Burgstaller Martignon 4 choreo. by Julie Marcotte	Barrie San Miguel; Galicia Flamenca; Jumpin' Jack by Scotty Morris choreo. by Pasquale Camerlengo	Uptown Funk by Mark Ronson ft. Bruno Mars
2016–2017	The Sound of Silence performed by Disturbed choreo. by Julie Marcotte	Blood Diamond by James Newton Howard choreo. by Julie Marcotte	Uptown Funk by Mark Ronson ft. Bruno Mars
2017–2018	The Sound of Silence performed by Disturbed choreo. by Julie Marcotte	I've Been Loving You Too Long by Otis Redding; Get Up Offa That Thing by James Brown; Coming Home by Leon Bridges; Uptown Funk by Bruno Mars	

== Competitive highlights ==
GP: Grand Prix; CS: Challenger Series; JGP: Junior Grand Prix

International
Event	06–07	07–08	08–09	10–11	11–12	12–13	13–14	14–15	15–16	16–17	17–18
Worlds							18th				
Four Continents						18th	11th				8th
GP Cup of China									11th		
GP NHK Trophy								6th	11th	10th	
GP Rostelecom Cup										6th	
GP Skate Canada					10th	7th	7th	WD			
CS Nebelhorn								5th	1st		
CS U.S. Classic										8th	
Lombardia Trophy							4th				
Nebelhorn Trophy					10th	14th					
International: Junior
Junior Worlds		21st	8th								
JGP Final			7th								
JGP Czech Republic	6th										
JGP Germany		14th									
JGP Mexico			2nd								
JGP Romania	10th										
JGP South Africa			3rd								
JGP U.K.		7th									
National
Canadian Champ.	2nd J	1st J	10th	5th	4th	4th	4th	6th	7th	6th	4th
J = Junior level; TBD = Assigned; WD = Withdrew
