= Rudi Swiegers =

Canadian pair skater

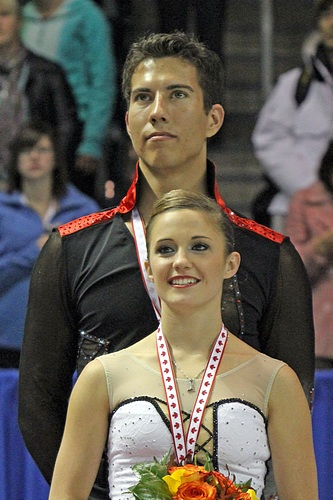
- Lawrence/Swiegers in 2010.

Personal information
- Born: August 31, 1987 (age 38) Cape Town, South Africa
- Home town: Virden, Manitoba
- Height: 1.85 m (6 ft 1 in)

Figure skating career
- Country: Canada
- Partner: Hayleigh Bell
- Coach: Anabelle Langlois, Cody Hay
- Skating club: Skate Regina
- Began skating: 1998
- Retired: June 15, 2016
Medal record
Representing Canada
Figure skating: Pairs
Four Continents Championships
Bronze medal – third place	2011 Taipei	Pairs
Canadian Championships
Bronze medal – third place	2011 Victoria	Pairs
Bronze medal – third place	2012 Moncton	Pairs
Bronze medal – third place	2013 Mississauga	Pairs
Bronze medal – third place	2014 Ottawa	Pairs

Rudi Swiegers (born August 31, 1987) is a Canadian retired pair skater. With previous partner Paige Lawrence, he is the 2011 Four Continents bronze medalist and a four-time Canadian national bronze medalist (2011–14). He later competed with Hayleigh Bell.

== Personal life ==
Swiegers was born in Cape Town, South Africa. His family moved to Canada for his mother, a physician, to work in Kipling, Saskatchewan. In 2009, he began studying part-time at Brandon University, focusing on psychology.

== Skating career ==
=== Early years ===
Swiegers began skating at age ten in Saskatchewan and began pairs at age fifteen. In 2005, his first partner, Kristin Bonkowski, decided to focus on her singles career.

=== Partnership with Lawrence ===
In summer 2005, Swiegers teamed up with Paige Lawrence, one of few skaters at his club who jumped in the same direction – clockwise.

Lawrence/Swiegers had a slow start in the junior ranks, placing 14th at Junior Nationals in 2006 and 2007. In 2008, however, they moved up to 2nd at the junior level and received several international assignments for the 2008–09 season. They were eighth and fifth at their two Junior Grand Prix assignments before finishing fourth at the 2009 World Junior Championships. They placed fourth on the senior level at Canadian Nationals.

In the 2009–10 season, the pair moved up to seniors. They were seventh at the NHK Trophy but dropped to sixth at Nationals, receiving no further assignments for the season.

Lawrence/Swiegers started the 2010–11 season at the 2010 Skate Canada International, where they won their first international medal, a bronze. They were fifth at the 2010 Cup of Russia. At the 2011 Canadian Nationals, they made several mistakes in the long program to finish in third place, their first podium finish at the event as seniors. They were named to the Canadian team for the 2011 Four Continents Championships. At the event, Swiegers was recognized as an example of good sportsmanship after lending his skate to Mark Ladwig during the short program. Ladwig's boot heel broke during his program and Swiegers, who had skated earlier in the day, quickly offered his own skate so that Ladwig and partner Amanda Evora could return to the ice to finish their program within the time allowed. Lawrence/Swiegers finished second in the short program and fourth in the free skate, with new personal best scores in both segments, and won the bronze medal. Swiegers later received a sportsmanship award from U.S. Figure Skating for his actions.

In late December 2011, Lawrence sustained a concussion in a training accident. The next month, the pair competed at the 2012 Canadian Championships, where they won their second national bronze medal.

Lawrence/Swiegers were named in Canada's team to the 2014 Winter Olympics in Sochi and finished 14th. The final event of their career was the 2014 World Championships in Saitama, Japan, where they placed 12th. They announced the end of their partnership on May 8, 2014.

=== Partnership with Bell ===
Swiegers teamed up with Hayleigh Bell in May 2015. They placed 5th in their international debut at the 2015 Skate Canada Autumn Classic and then 8th at a Grand Prix event, the 2015 Rostelecom Cup. On June 15, 2016, Swiegers and Bell announced their retirement on their Facebook page.

== Programs ==
=== With Bell ===
Season	Short program	Free skating
2015–2016	November Rain by Guns N' Roses choreo. by Mark Pillay	Howl's Moving Castle by Joe Hisaishi choreo. by Tyler Myles

=== With Lawrence ===
Season	Short program	Free skating	Exhibition
2013–2014	Olivier; I Put a Spell on You; Rudy's Bock	Oz the Great and Powerful by Danny Elfman	
2012–2013	Robin and Marian by John Barry	War Horse by John Williams	Black Velvet by Alannah Myles
2011–2012	Beetlejuice by Danny Elfman	D'Artagnan by Maxime Rodriguez; The Man in the Iron Mask by Nick Glennie-Smith; Nouvelle France by Patrick Doyle	
2010–2011	City Slickers by Marc Shaiman	Van Helsing by Alan Silvestri	
2009–2010	Baton Bunny by Milt Franklyn	Van Helsing by Alan Silvestri	
2008–2009	Orange Blossom Sorbet by Joe Trio	The Painted Veil by Alexandre Desplat	

== Competitive highlights ==
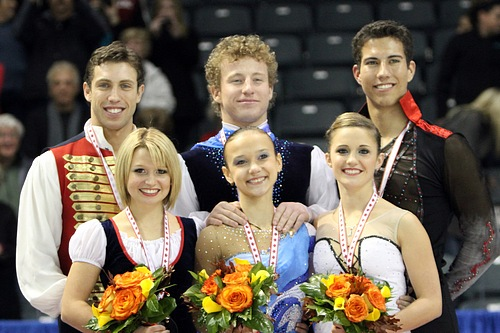
Lawrence/Swiegers with the other medalists at the 2010 Skate Canada

GP: Grand Prix; JGP: Junior Grand Prix

=== With Bell ===
International
Event	2015–16
GP Rostelecom Cup	8th
Skate Canada Autumn Classic	5th
National
Canadian Championships	8th

=== With Lawrence ===
International
Event	2005–06	2006–07	2007–08	2008–09	2009–10	2010–11	2011–12	2012–13	2013–14
Olympics									14th
Worlds									12th
Four Continents						3rd	7th	6th	
GP NHK Trophy					7th				6th
GP Rostel. Cup						5th		4th	
GP Skate Canada						3rd	8th	4th	4th
Nebelhorn Trophy							5th		
U.S. Classic								2nd	5th
International: Junior
Junior Worlds				4th					
JGP Belarus				8th					
JGP Germany			4th						
JGP U.K.				5th					
National
Canadian Champ.	14th J.	14th J.	2nd J.	4th	6th	3rd	3rd	3rd	3rd
SC Challenge							1st		
J. = Junior level
