= Anne Wright =

Anne Wright or Ann Wright may refer to:

- Ann Wright (born 1947), United States Army colonel and official
- Anne Wright (or Albright), one of the Canterbury Martyrs of 1556
- Anne Wright (academic administrator) (born 1946), British academic
- Anne Wright (author) (1793–1861), British author
- Anne Wright (historian) (1924–1981), Scottish historian and academic
- Anne St. Clair Wright (1910–1993), American preservationist
- Anne C. Wright, later Anne Wright-Grassham, geologist who mapped Minna Bluff and Snow Petrel Peak in 1987

== See also ==
- Anna Allen Wright (1882–1964), American herpetologist
- Mary Ann Wright (disambiguation)
- Wright (surname)
