= Hattie Noble =

American politician

Harriet Fitch Noble
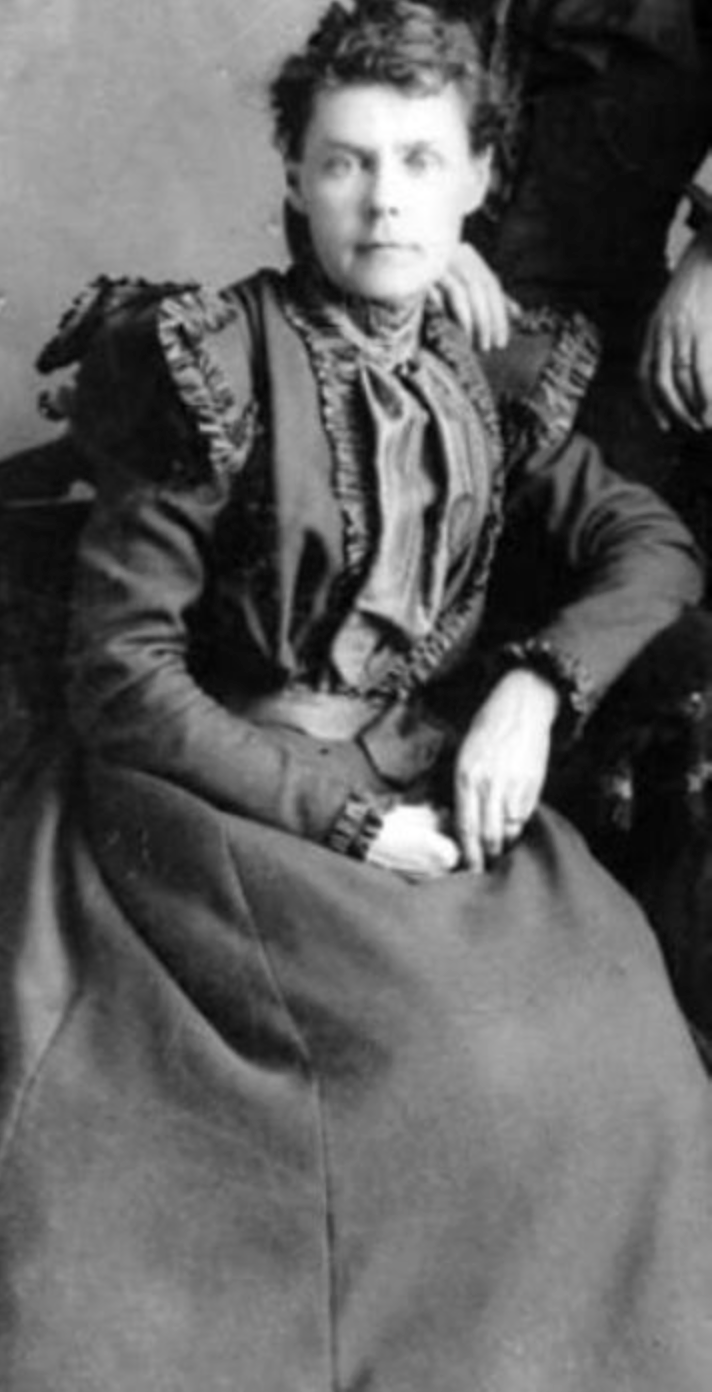
- Born: December, 1848; Columbus City, Iowa
- Died: August 21, 1930; Boise, Idaho
- Resting place: Morris Hill Cemetery
- Citizenship: United States
- Education: St. Helen’s Hall
- Occupations: Educator, politician, and suffragist
- Years active: 1989-1899
- Organization: Idaho House of Representatives
- Spouse: William B. Noble (married 1875-1898)
- Children: Gertrude (born 1876), William (born 1877), May (born 1880), and Harry (born 1883)
- Parent(s): Maria and Joseph A. Luckett

Harriet "Hattie" Fitch Noble (December 1848 – August 21, 1930) was an American educator and politician. She represented Boise County in the Idaho House of Representatives from 1898 to 1899. She was an advocate for women's suffrage and education. She was part of the Democratic Party.

== Early life ==
She was born Harriet Fitch Luckett in December 1848 in Columbus City, Iowa, to Maria and Joseph A. Luckett who ran a saloon. She is sometimes referred to as Harriet "Hattie" Luckett Noble, as Luckett was her maiden-name.

She moved with her family at the age of two to join the California Gold Rush and her father opened a saloon and bowling alley in Bestville, California. She was sent with her grandmother to attended school at St. Helen’s Hall in Portland, Oregon. Her family moved in 1865 to Idaho City and she joined them in 1867 and became a schoolteacher at the age of nineteen. Her father, who died in 1872, was one of the founding members of the Idaho City Mason Lodge.

She married the gold prospector William B. Noble in 1875, he had moved to Idaho in 1861 and was originally from Kentucky. Being born in 1823 he was around 25 years older than her. He suffered a head injury causing brain damage and became disabled and died in 1898 just before she held office. They had four children: Gertrude (born 1876), William (born 1877), May (born 1880), and Harry (born 1883).

After his death she continued to run his businesses and she started to become involved with the Democratic Party, temperance movement, and suffrage.

== Politics ==
Her first political position was when she was elected as the Engrossment Clerk for the 1875 legislative session.

After Idaho gave voting rights to women in 1896 she was elected as a Democrat in 1898 to the Idaho House of Representatives with two other women Mary A. Wright, a Populist of Kootenai County and Clara Campbell, a Republican of Ada County, Idaho. She represented Boise County along with representative E. T. Morgan and Senator Gilbert F. Smith, both Democrats. She served on the Committee for Enrolment and Public Health.

During her term she helped, along with Burton L. French, defeat a concerted effort to close the University of Idaho.

She did not seek re-election.

== Death ==
Noble died August 21, 1930, at her home 920 Hays Street, Boise, Idaho; she had been ill for two weeks. She was survived by her two daughters May and Gertrude, both teachers, and two sons William and Harry. She is buried in Boise at the Morris Hill Cemetery.
