= Mary Wright =

Mary Wright may refer to:

- Mary Allen Wright (1868–1948), American politician in Idaho
- Mary C. Wright (1917–1970), American historian of China
- Mary Kathryn Wright (1935–2020), American golfer
- Mary Louise Wright (1923–2004), American figure skater
- Mary Maude Dunn Wright, real name of Lilith Lorraine (1894–1967), American pulp fiction author, poet, journalist, and editor
- Mary Wright (designer) (1904–1952), American designer, author, and business person
- Mary Tappan Wright (1851–1916), American novelist and short story writer
- Mary Wright (gymnast) (1908–1975), American Olympic gymnast
- Mary J. Wright (1915–2014), Canadian psychologist
- Mary Helen Wright Greuter (December 20, 1914–1997), née Wright, American astronomer and historian
- Mary Honor Farrow Wright (1862–1946), African American educator and civic leader
- Mary Wright Gill (1867–1929), née Wright, American scientific illustrator
- Mary Wright (True Blood), character in 2013 drama series

== See also ==
- Mary Wright Sewell (1797–1884), British writer
- Mary Ann Wright (disambiguation)
