= 2015 Canadian Figure Skating Championships =

Figure skating competition

- Type: National championship
- Date: January 19 – 25
- Season: 2014–15
- Location: Kingston, Ontario
- Host: Skate Canada
- Venue: Rogers K-Rock Centre

Champions
- Men's singles: Nam Nguyen
- Ladies' singles: Gabrielle Daleman
- Pairs: Meagan Duhamel / Eric Radford
- Ice dance: Kaitlyn Weaver / Andrew Poje
- Previous: 2014 Canadian Championships
- Next: 2016 Canadian Championships

The 2015 Canadian Figure Skating Championships (branded as the 2015 Canadian Tire National Skating Championships for sponsorship reasons) were held January 19–25, 2015 in Kingston, Ontario. Organized by Skate Canada, the event determined the national champions of Canada. Medals were awarded in the disciplines of men's singles, women's singles, pair skating, and ice dancing on the senior, junior, and novice levels. Although the official International Skating Union terminology for female skaters in the singles category is ladies, Skate Canada uses women officially. The results of this competition were among the selection criteria for the 2015 World Championships, 2015 Four Continents Championships, and the 2015 World Junior Championships.

Kingston, Ontario was named as the host in May 2014. Competitors qualified at the Skate Canada Challenge, held in December 2014, or earned a bye.

== Medal summary ==
=== Senior ===
| Discipline | Gold | Silver | Bronze |
|---|---|---|---|
| Men | Nam Nguyen | Jeremy Ten | Liam Firus |
| Ladies | Gabrielle Daleman | Alaine Chartrand | Véronik Mallet |
| Pairs | Meagan Duhamel / Eric Radford | Liubov Ilyushechkina / Dylan Moscovitch | Julianne Séguin / Charlie Bilodeau |
| Ice dancing | Kaitlyn Weaver / Andrew Poje | Piper Gilles / Paul Poirier | Alexandra Paul / Mitchell Islam |

=== Junior ===
| Discipline | Gold | Silver | Bronze |
|---|---|---|---|
| Men | Nicolas Nadeau | Antony Cheng | Edrian Paul Célestino |
| Ladies | Selena Zhao | Cailey England | Justine Belzile |
| Pairs | Mary Orr / Phelan Simpson | Shalena Rau / Sébastien Arcieri | Rachael Dobson / Alexander Sheldrick |
| Ice dancing | Brianna Delmaestro / Timothy Lum | Lauren Collins / Shane Firus | Melinda Meng / Andrew Meng |

=== Novice ===
| Discipline | Gold | Silver | Bronze |
|---|---|---|---|
| Men | Gabriel St-Jean | Gabriel Farand | Conrad Orzel |
| Ladies | Rachel Pettitt | Alicia Pineault | Justine Brasseur |
| Pairs | Justine Brasseur / Mathieu Ostiguy | Olivia Boys-Eddy / Mackenzie Boys-Eddy | Lori-Ann Matte / Thierry Ferland |
| Ice dancing | Marjorie Lajoie / Zachary Lagha | Sabrina Bédard / Zoé Duval-Yergeau | Ellie Fisher / Parker Brown |

== Senior results ==
=== Men ===
Nguyen won his first senior national title.

| Rank | Name | Section | Total points | SP | | FS | |
|---|---|---|---|---|---|---|---|
| 1 | Nam Nguyen | CO | 256.88 | 1 | 81.78 | 1 | 175.10 |
| 2 | Jeremy Ten | BC/YK | 222.58 | 2 | 77.80 | 3 | 144.78 |
| 3 | Liam Firus | BC/YK | 222.40 | 4 | 73.20 | 2 | 149.20 |
| 4 | Roman Sadovsky | CO | 210.76 | 3 | 73.46 | 6 | 137.30 |
| 5 | Keegan Messing | AB/NT/NU | 208.17 | 6 | 70.00 | 5 | 138.17 |
| 6 | Elladj Baldé | QC | 204.38 | 7 | 64.79 | 4 | 139.59 |
| 7 | Christophe Belley | QC | 190.19 | 5 | 70.05 | 11 | 120.14 |
| 8 | Mitchell Gordon | BC/YK | 187.45 | 9 | 60.34 | 8 | 127.11 |
| 9 | Andrei Rogozine | CO | 187.09 | 10 | 56.08 | 7 | 131.01 |
| 10 | Nicolas Beaudoin | QC | 174.34 | 8 | 63.09 | 13 | 111.25 |
| 11 | Nicolas Tondreau-Alin | QC | 171.72 | 16 | 48.59 | 10 | 123.13 |
| 12 | Charles Dion | QC | 171.64 | 11 | 56.05 | 12 | 115.59 |
| 13 | Bennet Toman | QC | 171.53 | 18 | 46.85 | 9 | 124.68 |
| 14 | Garrett Gosselin | SK | 161.25 | 14 | 52.75 | 14 | 108.50 |
| 15 | Jack Kermezian | QC | 153.56 | 13 | 54.90 | 15 | 98.66 |
| 16 | Dominic Rondeau | QC | 144.93 | 15 | 48.68 | 16 | 96.25 |
| 17 | Leslie Ip | CO | 133.89 | 17 | 47.01 | 17 | 88.68 |
| WD | Kevin Reynolds | BC/YK | | 12 | 55.37 | | |

=== Women ===
Daleman won her first senior national title.

| Rank | Name | Section | Total points | SP | | FS | |
|---|---|---|---|---|---|---|---|
| 1 | Gabrielle Daleman | CO | 186.02 | 1 | 62.91 | 2 | 123.11 |
| 2 | Alaine Chartrand | EO | 184.24 | 3 | 60.25 | 1 | 123.99 |
| 3 | Véronik Mallet | QC | 172.43 | 2 | 61.19 | 3 | 111.24 |
| 4 | Roxanne Rheault | QC | 146.89 | 4 | 54.83 | 5 | 92.06 |
| 5 | Kim DeGuise-Léveillée | QC | 140.78 | 6 | 47.50 | 4 | 93.28 |
| 6 | Madelyn Dunley | CO | 137.98 | 5 | 49.59 | 8 | 88.39 |
| 7 | Michelle Long | CO | 137.34 | 7 | 46.48 | 6 | 90.86 |
| 8 | Stephie Walmsley | NS | 131.18 | 11 | 42.03 | 7 | 89.15 |
| 9 | Roxanne Cournoyer | QC | 126.37 | 9 | 45.96 | 10 | 80.41 |
| 10 | Eri Nishimura | CO | 126.22 | 14 | 41.37 | 9 | 84.85 |
| 11 | Rachel Gendron | QC | 124.69 | 8 | 46.28 | 12 | 78.41 |
| 12 | Marika Steward | NO | 120.16 | 13 | 41.50 | 11 | 78.66 |
| 13 | Valérie Lavergne | QC | 117.96 | 12 | 41.89 | 14 | 76.07 |
| 14 | Kira Gallant | AB/NT/NU | 116.74 | 10 | 45.93 | 18 | 70.81 |
| 15 | Julianne Delaurier | BC/YK | 115.71 | 16 | 37.62 | 13 | 78.09 |
| 16 | Marianne Rioux Ouellet | QC | 112.16 | 17 | 37.35 | 15 | 74.81 |
| 17 | Sandrine Martin | QC | 111.75 | 15 | 40.18 | 16 | 71.57 |
| 18 | Marie-Gabrielle Hémond | QC | 101.75 | 18 | 30.46 | 17 | 71.29 |

=== Pairs ===
Duhamel/Radford won their fourth national title.

| Rank | Name | Section | Total points | SP | | FS | |
|---|---|---|---|---|---|---|---|
| 1 | Meagan Duhamel / Eric Radford | QC | 230.19 | 1 | 79.50 | 1 | 150.69 |
| 2 | Liubov Ilyushechkina / Dylan Moscovitch | CO | 187.85 | 2 | 65.15 | 2 | 122.70 |
| 3 | Julianne Séguin / Charlie Bilodeau | QC | 181.43 | 3 | 61.47 | 3 | 119.96 |
| 4 | Kirsten Moore-Towers / Michael Marinaro | WO | 180.48 | 4 | 61.08 | 4 | 119.40 |
| 5 | Vanessa Grenier / Maxime Deschamps | QC | 143.46 | 6 | 54.26 | 5 | 89.20 |
| 6 | Natasha Purich / Andrew Wolfe | QC | 138.49 | 5 | 54.46 | 7 | 84.03 |
| 7 | Brittany Jones / Joshua Reagan | WO | 132.86 | 7 | 44.88 | 6 | 87.98 |

=== Ice dancing ===
Weaver/Poje won their first national title.

| Rank | Name | Section | Total points | SP | | FS | |
|---|---|---|---|---|---|---|---|
| 1 | Kaitlyn Weaver / Andrew Poje | NO | 187.88 | 1 | 76.26 | 1 | 111.62 |
| 2 | Piper Gilles / Paul Poirier | CO | 174.70 | 2 | 70.03 | 2 | 104.67 |
| 3 | Alexandra Paul / Mitchell Islam | CO | 160.67 | 3 | 64.87 | 5 | 95.80 |
| 4 | Nicole Orford / Thomas Williams | BC/YK | 157.89 | 5 | 61.06 | 3 | 96.83 |
| 5 | Élisabeth Paradis / François-Xavier Ouellette | QC | 157.83 | 4 | 61.50 | 4 | 96.33 |
| 6 | Mackenzie Bent / Garrett MacKeen | EO | 141.57 | 7 | 55.66 | 7 | 85.91 |
| 7 | Madeline Edwards / Zhao Kai Pang | BC/YK | 140.21 | 8 | 53.69 | 6 | 86.52 |
| 8 | Andréanne Poulin / Marc-André Servant | QC | 139.27 | 9 | 53.50 | 8 | 85.77 |
| 9 | Carolane Soucisse / Simon Tanguay | QC | 137.44 | 6 | 56.63 | 10 | 80.81 |
| 10 | Mariève Cyr / Benjamin Brisebois-Gaudreau | QC | 128.95 | 13 | 45.72 | 9 | 83.23 |
| 11 | Victoria Hasegawa / Connor Hasegawa | WO | 125.82 | 10 | 50.27 | 11 | 75.55 |
| 12 | Mélissande Dumas / Simon Proulx-Sénécal | QC | 122.78 | 11 | 47.81 | 12 | 74.97 |
| 13 | Catherine Daigle-Roy / Dominic Barthe | QC | 121.46 | 12 | 47.66 | 13 | 73.80 |
| 14 | Alexa Linden / Jean Luc Jackson | BC/YK | 107.79 | 14 | 40.06 | 14 | 67.73 |
| 15 | Jade Robitaille / Philippe Granger | QC | 87.24 | 15 | 35.61 | 15 | 51.63 |

== Junior results ==
=== Men ===
| Rank | Name | Section | Total points | SP | | FS | |
|---|---|---|---|---|---|---|---|
| 1 | Nicolas Nadeau | QC | 185.78 | 1 | 62.10 | 1 | 123.68 |
| 2 | Antony Cheng | CO | 176.96 | 2 | 59.64 | 2 | 117.32 |
| 3 | Edrian Paul Célestino | QC | 172.68 | 3 | 58.24 | 4 | 114.44 |
| 4 | Daniel-Olivier Boulanger-Trottier | QC | 169.61 | 5 | 54.83 | 3 | 114.78 |
| 5 | Joseph Phan | QC | 158.36 | 4 | 56.56 | 6 | 101.80 |
| 6 | Olivier Bergeron | QC | 155.27 | 6 | 54.47 | 7 | 100.80 |
| 7 | Laurent Guay | QC | 154.45 | 7 | 52.43 | 5 | 102.02 |
| 8 | Alexander Lawrence | BC/YK | 140.02 | 9 | 48.08 | 8 | 91.94 |
| 9 | Mitchell Brennan | WO | 136.65 | 8 | 49.52 | 9 | 87.13 |
| 10 | Josh Allen | EO | 130.63 | 11 | 44.77 | 11 | 85.86 |
| 11 | Zachary Daleman | CO | 130.44 | 12 | 44.11 | 10 | 86.33 |
| 12 | Cody Wong | WO | 123.55 | 14 | 41.13 | 12 | 82.42 |
| 13 | Grayson Rosen | AB/NT/NU | 121.75 | 15 | 40.07 | 13 | 81.68 |
| 14 | Liam Mahood | CO | 119.60 | 10 | 45.83 | 16 | 73.77 |
| 15 | Shawn Cuevas | BC/YK | 119.10 | 13 | 41.93 | 15 | 77.17 |
| 16 | Trennt Michaud | EO | 118.10 | 16 | 39.87 | 14 | 78.23 |
| 17 | Kurtis Schreiber | AB/NT/NU | 110.79 | 17 | 38.50 | 17 | 72.29 |
| 18 | Jarret Melanson | NO | 95.16 | 18 | 31.86 | 18 | 63.30 |

=== Women ===
| Rank | Name | Section | Total points | SP | | FS | |
|---|---|---|---|---|---|---|---|
| 1 | Selena Zhao | QC | 140.67 | 1 | 50.21 | 1 | 90.46 |
| 2 | Cailey England | BC/YK | 127.33 | 2 | 47.93 | 2 | 79.40 |
| 3 | Justine Belzile | QC | 124.22 | 5 | 45.87 | 3 | 78.35 |
| 4 | Pascale Pilote Harvey | QC | 121.09 | 4 | 46.55 | 6 | 74.54 |
| 5 | Triena Robinson | AB/NT/NU | 120.39 | 8 | 44.26 | 4 | 76.13 |
| 6 | Sarah Tamura | BC/YK | 119.23 | 9 | 43.50 | 5 | 75.73 |
| 7 | Megan Yim | BC/YK | 115.69 | 3 | 46.86 | 12 | 68.83 |
| 8 | Rachel LaFleche | WO | 112.33 | 11 | 42.26 | 9 | 70.07 |
| 9 | Zoe Gong | EO | 110.92 | 13 | 40.24 | 8 | 70.68 |
| 10 | Emy Decelles | QC | 110.44 | 12 | 41.02 | 10 | 69.42 |
| 11 | Kelsey Wong | BC/YK | 109.08 | 6 | 45.26 | 15 | 63.82 |
| 12 | Shelby Hall | SK | 108.79 | 10 | 42.33 | 14 | 66.46 |
| 13 | Kim Decelles | QC | 108.10 | 16 | 37.33 | 7 | 70.77 |
| 14 | Alexis Dion | EO | 106.85 | 14 | 39.03 | 13 | 67.82 |
| 15 | Semi Won | AB/NT/NU | 102.72 | 17 | 33.69 | 11 | 69.03 |
| 16 | Taylor LeClaire | AB/NT/NU | 102.14 | 7 | 44.78 | 16 | 57.36 |
| 17 | Grace Lin | QC | 92.99 | 15 | 37.95 | 17 | 55.04 |
| 18 | Taylor Hunsley | WO | 31.26 | 18 | 31.26 | - | - |

=== Pairs ===
| Rank | Name | Section | Total points | SP | | FS | |
|---|---|---|---|---|---|---|---|
| 1 | Mary Orr / Phelan Simpson | WO | 133.14 | 1 | 48.04 | 1 | 85.10 |
| 2 | Shalena Rau / Sébastien Arcieri | WO | 120.30 | 6 | 39.25 | 2 | 81.05 |
| 3 | Rachael Dobson / Alexander Sheldrick | WO | 119.62 | 5 | 40.19 | 3 | 79.43 |
| 4 | Hope McLean / Trennt Michaud | EO | 119.12 | 2 | 42.74 | 4 | 76.38 |
| 5 | Keelee Gingrich / Davin Portz | AB/NT/NU | 117.35 | 3 | 41.86 | 5 | 75.49 |
| 6 | Camille Ruest / Samuel Morais | QC | 113.69 | 4 | 41.01 | 6 | 72.68 |
| 7 | Bryn Hoffman / Bryce Chudak | AB/NT/NU | 106.28 | 7 | 39.07 | 8 | 67.21 |
| 8 | Allison Eby / Brett Varley | WO | 104.14 | 8 | 35.18 | 7 | 68.96 |
| 9 | Naomie Boudreau / Cédric Savard | QC | 93.67 | 9 | 33.66 | 9 | 60.01 |
| 10 | Kassandra Trépanier / David-Alexandre Paradis | QC | 85.82 | 10 | 31.87 | 10 | 53.95 |
| WD | Sarah-Jade Latulippe / Alex Leak | QC | | | | | |

=== Ice dancing ===
| Rank | Name | Section | Total points | SP | | FS | |
|---|---|---|---|---|---|---|---|
| 1 | Brianna Delmaestro / Timothy Lum | BC/YK | 148.62 | 1 | 59.21 | 1 | 89.41 |
| 2 | Lauren Collins / Shane Firus | CO | 139.83 | 2 | 55.76 | 2 | 84.07 |
| 3 | Melinda Meng / Andrew Meng | QC | 131.14 | 3 | 53.75 | 4 | 77.39 |
| 4 | Danielle Wu / Spencer Soo | BC/YK | 127.46 | 4 | 49.78 | 3 | 77.68 |
| 5 | Hannah Whitely / Elliott Graham | CO | 117.45 | 7 | 45.58 | 5 | 71.87 |
| 6 | Valerie Taillefer / Jason Chan | QC | 117.03 | 5 | 48.94 | 6 | 68.09 |
| 7 | Megan Koenig-Croft / Jake Richardson | CO | 110.29 | 8 | 44.62 | 7 | 65.67 |
| 8 | Kayla Charky / Simon Dazé | QC | 101.10 | 9 | 41.47 | 9 | 59.63 |
| 9 | Haley Sales / Nikolas Wamsteeker | BC/YK | 99.57 | 10 | 36.59 | 8 | 62.98 |
| 10 | Payten Howland / Simon-Pierre Malette-Paquette | QC | 99.27 | 6 | 46.35 | 10 | 52.92 |
| 11 | Alycia O'Leary / Olvier Grutter | QC | 81.48 | 12 | 35.88 | 11 | 45.60 |
| 12 | Mira Samoisette / Alexander Seidel | QC | 80.86 | 11 | 36.10 | 12 | 44.76 |
| WD | Christina Penkov / Aaron Chapplain | QC | | | | | |
| WD | Audrey Croteau-Villeneuve / Jeff Hough | EO | | | | | |
| WD | Vanessa Chartrand / Stefan Dyck | EO | | | | | |

== Novice results ==
=== Men ===
| Rank | Name | Section | Total points | SP | | FS | |
|---|---|---|---|---|---|---|---|
| 1 | Gabriel St-Jean | QC | 118.23 | 2 | 43.18 | 3 | 75.05 |
| 2 | Gabriel Farand | QC | 117.09 | 1 | 43.51 | 5 | 73.58 |
| 3 | Conrad Orzel | CO | 115.35 | 8 | 34.86 | 1 | 80.49 |
| 4 | Thierry Ferland | QC | 114.06 | 6 | 37.66 | 2 | 76.40 |
| 5 | Zoé Duval-Yergeau | QC | 112.01 | 5 | 37.67 | 4 | 74.34 |
| 6 | Bruce Waddell | CO | 111.85 | 3 | 40.04 | 6 | 71.81 |
| 7 | Cameron Hines | EO | 101.08 | 9 | 33.74 | 8 | 67.34 |
| 8 | Christian Reekie | EO | 99.74 | 10 | 32.01 | 7 | 67.73 |
| 9 | Matthew Wright | WO | 96.29 | 7 | 37.05 | 12 | 59.24 |
| 10 | Brian Le | BC/YK | 92.67 | 4 | 37.98 | 15 | 54.69 |
| 11 | Veniamins Volskis | BC/YK | 89.95 | 12 | 30.35 | 11 | 59.60 |
| 12 | Jérémie Crevaux | QC | 89.58 | 18 | 24.49 | 9 | 65.09 |
| 13 | Pier-Alexandre Hudon | QC | 88.60 | 14 | 29.50 | 13 | 59.10 |
| 14 | Benjam Papp | BC/YK | 87.32 | 17 | 26.08 | 10 | 61.24 |
| 15 | William Langlois | QC | 83.03 | 16 | 26.62 | 14 | 56.41 |
| 16 | James Henri-Singh | QC | 83.02 | 13 | 29.92 | 16 | 53.10 |
| 17 | Jack Dushenski | CO | 80.31 | 11 | 30.62 | 18 | 49.69 |
| 18 | Austin Ma | BC/YK | 77.86 | 15 | 27.06 | 17 | 50.80 |
| WD | Zachary Lagha | QC | | | | | |

=== Women ===
| Rank | Name | Section | Total points | SP | | FS | |
|---|---|---|---|---|---|---|---|
| 1 | Rachel Pettitt | BC/YK | 112.87 | 3 | 37.00 | 1 | 75.87 |
| 2 | Alicia Pineault | QC | 109.63 | 2 | 40.65 | 4 | 68.98 |
| 3 | Justine Brasseur | QC | 109.05 | 1 | 43.05 | 6 | 66.00 |
| 4 | McKenna Colthorp | BC/YK | 108.18 | 10 | 32.58 | 2 | 75.60 |
| 5 | Amélie Hervieux | QC | 104.63 | 9 | 33.45 | 3 | 71.18 |
| 6 | Aislinn Ganci | AB/NT/NU | 103.96 | 5 | 36.61 | 5 | 67.35 |
| 7 | Marjorie Comtois | QC | 100.25 | 7 | 34.96 | 8 | 65.29 |
| 8 | Théa Araji | QC | 96.60 | 12 | 32.35 | 9 | 64.25 |
| 9 | Tressa Sabo | AB/NT/NU | 94.25 | 6 | 36.44 | 12 | 57.81 |
| 10 | Amanda Tobin | WO | 95.08 | 11 | 32.40 | 10 | 61.68 |
| 11 | Ajsha Gorman | BC/YK | 92.34 | 18 | 27.04 | 7 | 65.30 |
| 12 | Emma Jianopoulos | EO | 89.98 | 14 | 31.57 | 11 | 58.41 |
| 13 | Sandrine Desrosiers | QC | 89.95 | 4 | 36.98 | 17 | 52.97 |
| 14 | Helene Carle | CO | 89.58 | 8 | 34.69 | 14 | 54.89 |
| 15 | Alison Schumacher | WO | 87.93 | 17 | 30.19 | 13 | 57.74 |
| 16 | Clara Campbell | CO | 85.22 | 15 | 31.32 | 16 | 53.90 |
| 17 | Jessica McHugh | BC/YK | 84.43 | 16 | 30.21 | 15 | 54.22 |
| 18 | Elvie Carroll | BC/YK | 79.93 | 13 | 31.62 | 18 | 48.31 |

=== Pairs ===
| Rank | Name | Section | Total points | SP | | FS | |
|---|---|---|---|---|---|---|---|
| 1 | Justine Brasseur / Mathieu Ostiguy | QC | 111.63 | 1 | 36.91 | 1 | 74.72 |
| 2 | Olivia Boys-Eddy / Mackenzie Boys-Eddy | CO | 108.44 | 2 | 35.74 | 2 | 72.70 |
| 3 | Lori-Ann Matte / Thierry Ferland | QC | 103.60 | 3 | 35.52 | 3 | 68.08 |
| 4 | Jamie Knoblauch / Nathan O'Brien | WO | 101.35 | 4 | 34.32 | 4 | 67.03 |
| 5 | Cassandra Leung / Richard Beauchesne | CO | 87.00 | 6 | 32.26 | 5 | 54.74 |
| 6 | Tessa Jones / Matthew den Boer | BC/YK | 82.25 | 8 | 28.79 | 6 | 53.46 |
| 7 | Colleen Collins / Alex Brauner | AB/NT/NU | 82.23 | 7 | 29.43 | 7 | 52.80 |
| 8 | Fanny Durand / Steven Lapointe | QC | 81.26 | 5 | 32.63 | 10 | 48.63 |
| 9 | Katrina Lopez / Kurtis Schreiber | AB/NT/NU | 80.31 | 9 | 28.78 | 8 | 51.53 |
| 10 | Renata Wong / Cody Wong | WO | 78.63 | 10 | 28.76 | 9 | 49.87 |
| 11 | Sarah Kedves / Lucas Pallard | BC/YK | 69.24 | 11 | 23.76 | 11 | 45.48 |
| WD | Jennyfer Richer-Labelle / Alexandre Cabana | | | | | | |

=== Ice dancing ===
| Rank | Name | Section | Total points | PD1 | | PD2 | | FD | |
|---|---|---|---|---|---|---|---|---|---|
| 1 | Marjorie Lajoie / Zachary Lagha | QC | 93.80 | 2 | 13.32 | 1 | 15.86 | 1 | 64.62 |
| 2 | Sabrina Bédard / Zoé Duval-Yergeau | QC | 90.85 | 4 | 13.19 | 2 | 14.37 | 2 | 63.29 |
| 3 | Ellie Fisher / Parker Brown | CO | 88.55 | 5 | 13.01 | 3 | 13.63 | 3 | 61.91 |
| 4 | Ashlynne Stairs / Lee Royer | BC/YK | 83.25 | 7 | 11.30 | 5 | 12.94 | 4 | 59.01 |
| 5 | Victoria Oliver / George Waddell | CO | 81.89 | 6 | 12.94 | 7 | 12.69 | 5 | 56.26 |
| 6 | Alicia Fabbri / Claudio Pietrantonio | QC | 81.29 | 1 | 14.40 | 4 | 13.13 | 6 | 53.76 |
| 7 | Gina Cipriano / Bradley Keeping Myra | NS | 76.03 | 3 | 13.32 | 6 | 12.77 | 9 | 49.94 |
| 8 | Priya Ramesh / Brandon Labelle | CO | 74.18 | 9 | 9.51 | 10 | 10.96 | 7 | 53.71 |
| 9 | Nicola Salimova / Paul Ayer | AB/NT/NU | 73.54 | 10 | 9.49 | 8 | 11.82 | 8 | 52.23 |
| 10 | Cassidy McFarlane / Kyle Cayouette | QC | 68.71 | 8 | 9.64 | 11 | 10.47 | 10 | 48.60 |
| 11 | Talia Rancourt / Alex Gunther | EO | 66.12 | 11 | 9.16 | 9 | 11.56 | 12 | 45.40 |
| 12 | Émilie Bourassa / Anthony Campanelli | QC | 65.41 | 13 | 8.48 | 12 | 9.55 | 11 | 47.38 |
| 13 | Sara Marier / Jeffrey Wong | QC | 61.05 | 14 | 7.09 | 14 | 8.96 | 13 | 45.00 |
| 14 | Yohanna Broker / Malcolm Kowan | CO | 58.39 | 12 | 7.78 | 13 | 9.36 | 14 | 40.25 |
| 15 | Laura Emery / Dean Holbrough | WO | 54.30 | 15 | 6.87 | 15 | 7.70 | 15 | 39.73 |

== International team selections ==
=== World Championships ===
The team for the 2015 World Championships was announced on January 25, 2015, as follows:

| | Men | Ladies | Pairs | Ice dancing |
|---|---|---|---|---|
| 1 | Nam Nguyen | Gabrielle Daleman | Meagan Duhamel / Eric Radford | Kaitlyn Weaver / Andrew Poje |
| 2 | Jeremy Ten | Alaine Chartrand | Liubov Ilyushechkina / Dylan Moscovitch | Piper Gilles / Paul Poirier |
| 3 | | | Julianne Séguin / Charlie Bilodeau | Alexandra Paul / Mitchell Islam |

=== Four Continents Championships ===
The team for the 2015 Four Continents Championships was announced on January 25, 2015, as follows:

| | Men | Ladies | Pairs | Ice dancing |
|---|---|---|---|---|
| 1 | Nam Nguyen | Gabrielle Daleman | Meagan Duhamel / Eric Radford | Kaitlyn Weaver / Andrew Poje |
| 2 | Jeremy Ten | Alaine Chartrand | Liubov Ilyushechkina / Dylan Moscovitch | Piper Gilles / Paul Poirier |
| 3 | Liam Firus | Véronik Mallet | Kirsten Moore-Towers / Michael Marinaro | Alexandra Paul / Mitchell Islam |

=== World Junior Championships ===
The team for the 2015 World Junior Championships was announced on January 25, 2015, as follows:

| | Men | Ladies | Pairs | Ice dancing |
|---|---|---|---|---|
| 1 | Roman Sadovsky | Selena Zhao | Julianne Séguin / Charlie Bilodeau | Mackenzie Bent / Garrett MacKeen |
| 2 | Nicolas Nadeau | Kim DeGuise-Léveillée | Mary Orr / Phelan Simpson | Madeline Edwards / Zhao Kai Pang |
| 3 | | | Shalena Rau / Sébastien Arcieri | |
