= Mary Ann Wright =

Mary Ann Wright may refer to:

- Mary Ann Wright (murderer) (1820–1860), American housewife convicted of poisoning
- Mary Ann Wright (Delaware) (1920–2006) in Hall of Fame of Delaware Women
- Mary Ann Wright (activist) (1921–2009), American humanitarian activist
- Mary Ann Wright (colonel) (born 1947), American colonel

== See also ==
- Mary Wright (disambiguation)
- Anne Wright (disambiguation)
- Wright (surname)
