= Andrew Poje =

Canadian ice dancer

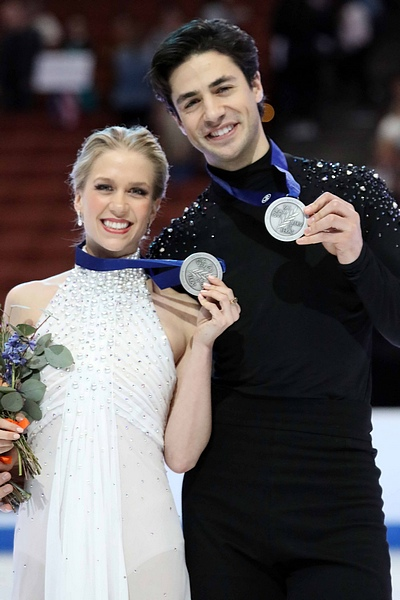
- Kaitlyn Weaver and Andrew Poje at the 2019 Four Continents Championships

Personal information
- Born: February 25, 1987 (age 39) Waterloo, Ontario, Canada
- Home town: Waterloo, Ontario & Fort Lee, New Jersey, United States
- Height: 1.90 m (6 ft 3 in)

Figure skating career
- Country: Canada
- Discipline: Ice dance
- Began skating: 1994
- Retired: 2019
- Highest WS: 1st (2014–15)

Medal record
Event	Gold medal – first place	Silver medal – second place	Bronze medal – third place
World Championships	0	1	2
Four Continents Championships	2	1	2
Grand Prix Final	2	0	0
Canadian Championships	3	5	4
World Team Trophy	0	1	0
World Junior Championships	0	0	1
Medal list
World Championships
Silver medal – second place	2014 Saitama	Ice dance
Bronze medal – third place	2015 Shanghai	Ice dance
Silver medal – second place	2018 Milan	Ice dance
Four Continents Championships
Gold medal – first place	2010 Jeonju	Ice dance
Gold medal – first place	2015 Seoul	Ice dance
Silver medal – second place	2019 Anaheim	Ice dance
Bronze medal – third place	2012 Colorado Springs	Ice dance
Bronze medal – third place	2016 Taipei	Ice dance
Grand Prix Final
Gold medal – first place	2014–15 Barcelona	Ice dance
Gold medal – first place	2015–16 Barcelona	Ice dance
Canadian Championships
Gold medal – first place	2015 Kingston	Ice dance
Gold medal – first place	2016 Halifax	Ice dance
Gold medal – first place	2019 Saint John	Ice dance
Silver medal – second place	2008 Vancouver	Ice dance
Silver medal – second place	2011 Victoria	Ice dance
Silver medal – second place	2012 Moncton	Ice dance
Silver medal – second place	2014 Ottawa	Ice dance
Silver medal – second place	2017 Ottawa	Ice dance
Bronze medal – third place	2007 Halifax	Ice dance
Bronze medal – third place	2009 Saskatoon	Ice dance
Bronze medal – third place	2010 London	Ice dance
Bronze medal – third place	2018 Vancouver	Ice dance
World Team Trophy
Silver medal – second place	2013 Tokyo	Team
World Junior Championships
Bronze medal – third place	2007 Oberstdorf	Ice dance

Andrew Poje (born February 25, 1987) is a Canadian ice dancer. With partner Kaitlyn Weaver, he is a three-time World medalist (2014 silver, 2015 and 2018 bronze), a two-time Four Continents champion (2010, 2015), a two-time Grand Prix Final champion (2014–15, 2015–16), and a three-time Canadian national champion (2015, 2016, 2019).

== Personal life ==
Andrew Poje was born on February 25, 1987, in Waterloo, Ontario. His ancestry is Slovak — his mother was born in Bratislava — and Slovenian Gottscheer. He is the great-nephew of former pair skater and coach Agnesa Búřilová (née Wlachovská). He has some knowledge of French.

== Career ==
=== Early career ===
Poje took up ice dancing at age seven and also skated in singles until he was 13. In his early career, he competed with Alexandra Nino, with whom he is the 2001 Canadian novice silver medalist. He teamed up with Alice Graham in late spring 2004. They trained in Kitchener-Waterloo with coaches Paul MacIntosh, Rebecca Babb, Susie McGrigor, and Bernie Ford. They won the bronze medal on the junior level at the 2005 Canadian Championships and placed ninth at the senior level at the 2006 Canadian Championships.

=== 2006–07 season: Junior World bronze ===
Poje teamed up with American-born Kaitlyn Weaver in August 2006. They trained in Kitchener-Waterloo, Ontario under coach Paul MacIntosh.

Weaver/Poje competed on the 2006–07 ISU Junior Grand Prix, winning two bronze medals. They went to the 2007 Canadian Championships and won the bronze medal in their first season together. They were placed on the team to the 2007 Junior Worlds. Weaver dislocated her left shoulder in the warm-up before the original dance but was able to compete and the couple won the bronze medal. They placed twentieth at the 2007 World Championships.

=== 2007–08 season ===
In the 2007–08 season, Weaver/Poje competed on the senior Grand Prix series at the 2008 Skate Canada International, where they placed 6th, and at the 2007 Trophée Eric Bompard, where they placed seventh. They won the silver medal at the 2008 Canadian Championships, placed 5th at the 2008 Four Continents, and seventeenth at the 2008 World Championships. In January 2008, they moved to Toronto to train with new coach Shae-Lynn Bourne.

=== 2008–09 season ===
In the 2008–09 season, Weaver/Poje competed on the Grand Prix series at the 2008 Cup of China, where they placed 6th, and at the 2008 NHK Trophy, where they placed 7th. They won the bronze medal at the 2009 Canadian Championships and placed fifth at the 2009 Four Continents. Weaver was granted Canadian citizenship in June 2009. Advised by Bourne that they needed a more competitive atmosphere, they switched training bases in 2009 to the Detroit Skating Club in Bloomfield Hills, Michigan, where they were coached by Pasquale Camerlengo and Anjelika Krylova. They also continued to work with Bourne. Massimo Scali, Natalia Annenko, and Elizabeth Punsalan were also members of the coaching team in Michigan.

=== 2009–10 season: Four Continents gold ===
During the 2009–10 season, Weaver/Poje won their first Grand Prix medal, bronze at 2009 Skate Canada International. They also won bronze at the 2010 Canadian Championships. They were sent to the 2010 Four Continents where they won the gold medal. They did not qualify for the Olympic or World teams.

=== 2010–11 season ===
During the 2010–11 season, Weaver/Poje won silver medals at the 2010 NHK Trophy and the 2011 Canadian Championships. They qualified for their first Grand Prix Final, where they finished 5th. They were fourth at the 2011 Four Continents. They were sent to the 2011 World Championships and placed fifth, a significant improvement over their previous best result of seventeenth at the event.

=== 2011–12 season: Four Continents bronze ===
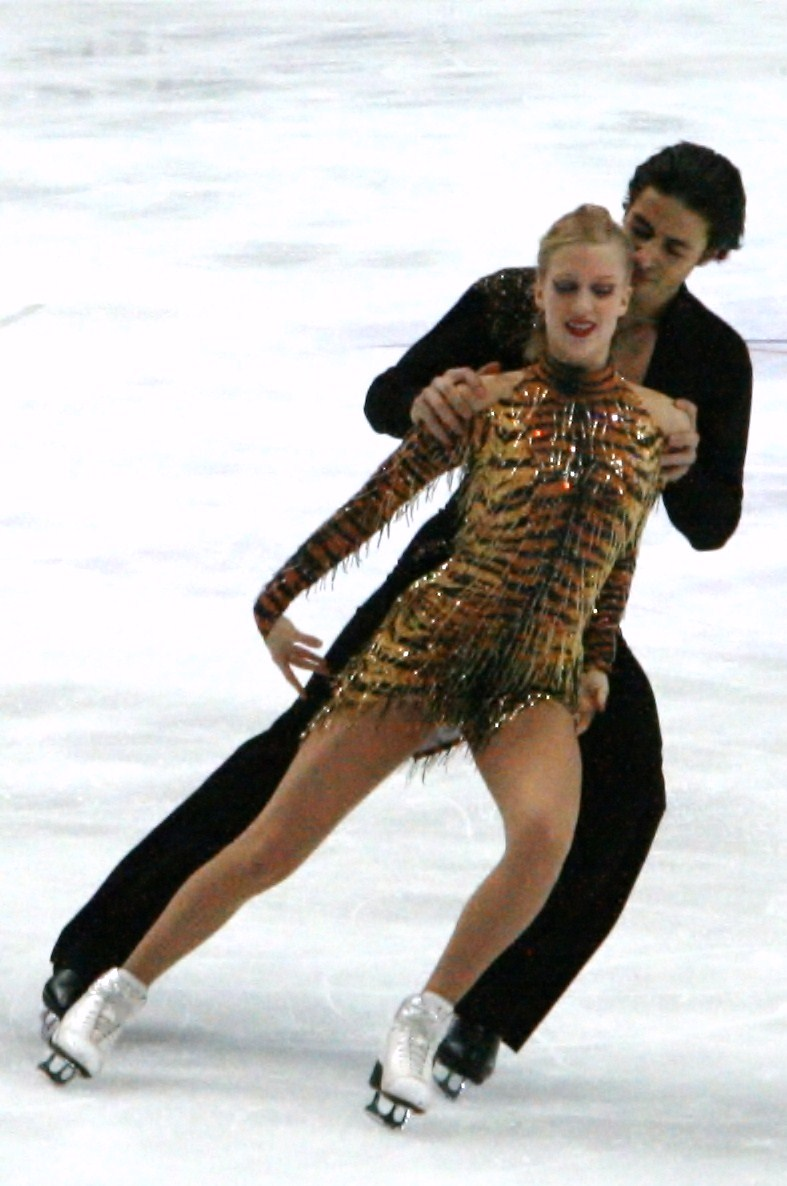
Weaver and Poje at the 2011 Rostelecom Cup

In the 2011–12 season, Weaver/Poje chose their free dance music on the suggestion of an anonymous fan. Karl Hugo composed additional music to add greater variation to the program. Weaver/Poje competed at three Grand Prix events and won three silver medals. They took the bronze medal at 2012 Four Continents before ending their season at the 2012 World Championships, where they placed fourth.

=== 2012–13 season ===
For the 2012–13 season, Weaver/Poje decided to go in a new direction and asked a contemporary dancer, Allison Holker, to work with them on their free dance. They began their season by winning gold at the 2012 Ondrej Nepela Memorial. Weaver/Poje's Grand Prix assignments were the 2012 Skate America and 2012 Cup of China. At both events, they were second in the short and third in the free dance and won the bronze medal overall behind Russians Ekaterina Bobrova / Dmitri Soloviev.

Weaver fractured her left fibula on December 14, 2012, when she fell into the boards during training in Bloomfield Hills, Michigan, and underwent surgery on December 18 in Toronto. As a result, the duo withdrew from the 2013 Canadian Championships. Hoping to compete at Worlds, Poje continued to train in Michigan, with Krylova acting as his partner, while Weaver recovered in Toronto. In mid-February, Weaver/Poje were added to Canada's World team. They placed fifth at the 2013 World Championships in London, Ontario.

=== 2013–14 season: Sochi Olympics and World silver ===
In the 2013–14 season, Weaver/Poje won two silver medals on the Grand Prix series and placed fifth at the Grand Prix Final. After taking silver at the 2014 Canadian Championships, they were selected to represent Canada at the 2014 Winter Olympics in Sochi, where they finished seventh. At the 2014 World Championships in Saitama, Japan, Weaver/Poje placed second in the short dance and third in the free dance. Finishing 0.02 of a point behind Italy's Cappellini/Lanotte and 0.04 ahead of France's Pechalat/Bourzat, they ended the competition as silver medalists.

=== 2014–15 season: Grand Prix Final and Four Continents gold, World bronze ===
In the 2014–15 season, Weaver/Poje took gold at both of their Grand Prix assignments, the 2014 Skate Canada International and 2014 NHK Trophy. In December 2014, they won the Grand Prix Final in Barcelona, having ranked first in both segments ahead of the United States' Madison Chock / Evan Bates. In January, Weaver/Poje won their first Canadian Championship title. They again defeated Chock/Bates at the Four Continents Championships, held in Seoul in February 2015. Weaver/Poje were third in the short dance but first in the free dance, en route to their second Four Continents title. They capped off the season with a bronze medal at the 2015 World Figure Skating Championships.

=== 2015–16 season: Second Grand Prix Final gold ===
At the beginning of the 2015–16 season, Weaver/Poje placed first at the 2015 Finlandia Trophy. However, they received the feedback from the judges that their Elvis Presley medley did not have clear rhythm required for the short dance. They changed the music to a set of Johann Strauss II pieces and won the 2015 Skate Canada International three weeks later. The team went on to win the 2015 Rostelecom Cup as well as their second consecutive gold at the 2015–16 Grand Prix of Figure Skating Final.

In the second half of the 2015–16 season, Weaver/Poje won their second consecutive national title and finished third at the 2016 Four Continents Figure Skating Championships the following month. The team capped of their season with a fifth-place finish at the 2016 World Figure Skating Championships.

=== 2016–17 season ===
During the 2016–17 season, Weaver/Poje began working with Nikolai Morozov as their new coach, training in both New Jersey and Moscow, Russia. They placed second at the Cup of China and third at the 2016 Rostelecom Cup. They won the silver medal at the Canadian Championships and placed fifth at Four Continents. Weaver/Poje finished their season in fourth place at the 2017 World Figure Skating Championships.

=== 2017–18 season: Pyeongchang Olympics and third Worlds medal ===
For the 2017–18 season, Weaver/Poje returned with a free dance from the 2011–12 season, 'Je Suis Malade'. They came in second at 2017 Skate Canada and placed fourth at 2017 Inernationaux de France. The couple came in third at the 2018 Canadian Championships, behind Virtue/Moir and Gilles/Poirier. Weaver/Poje represented Canada at the 2018 Winter Olympics in Pyeongchang, placing seventh in ice dancing. At the 2018 World Figure Skating Championships, Weaver/Poje won the bronze medal after placing third in the short dance and fourth in the free dance.

=== 2018–19 season: Four Continents silver ===
For the 2018–19 season, Weaver/Poje chose for their free dance "S.O.S. d'un terrien en détresse", a song from the French musical Starmania, after seeing it used by Kazakhstani figure skater Denis Ten. Ten was murdered in July 2018, at which point the pair came to regard the program as a tribute to their friend. They competed at and won the 2018 CS Autumn Classic International, before planning to skip the 2018–19 Grand Prix in favour of a nationwide tour organized by Virtue and Moir.

Returning to competition for the 2019 Canadian Championships, Weaver/Poje placed first in the rhythm dance. As one of the few senior teams who had previously competed the Tango Romantica pattern when it was a compulsory dance in the 2009–10 season, Poje commented that this was both "a benefit and a detriment" due to the changing style of judging. They came second in the free dance, behind Gilles/Poirier, but won the gold medal overall by 1.47 points, their narrowest victory over Gilles/Poirier at Canadian Nationals. Weaver said that, in addition to Ten, the program had been skated in tribute to their recently deceased friend, American pairs skater John Coughlin.

At the 2019 Four Continents Championships, Weaver/Poje placed third in the rhythm dance, behind Madison Hubbell / Zachary Donohue and Chock/Bates. In the free dance, they again ranked third, behind Chock/Bates and Gilles/Poirier, with Hubbell/Donohue falling into fourth place due to a major error on their stationary lift. Weaver/Poje won the silver medal overall.

Weaver/Poje next competed at the 2019 World Championships. They came in fifth place in both segments, scoring a personal best of 82.84 points in the rhythm dance, only 0.26 points out of third. They then scored 122.78 points in the free dance, scoring 205.62 points in total and coming in fifth overall. They concluded their season at the 2019 World Team Trophy, representing Team Canada. They scored 79.60 points in the rhythm dance and a new personal best of 124.18 points in the free dance, while Team Canada finished fifth overall.

=== 2019–20 season ===
On June 19, 2019, Weaver and Poje announced that they would not compete in the Grand Prix that autumn, and that they were going to evaluate their future plans.

== Post-competitive career ==
Following his retirement from competition, Poje continued to perform with Stars on Ice. He appeared on two seasons of the CBC competition program Battle of the Blades, finishing in second place in the fifth season partnered with Natalie Spooner, and later being eliminated in the second round of the sixth season partnered with Meghan Agosta.

In August 2021, it was announced that he would be joining the coaching staff of the Kelowna Skating Club in Kelowna, British Columbia.

== Programs ==
=== With Weaver ===
Season	Short dance	Free dance	Exhibition
2018–19	Tango: Libertango by Astor Piazzolla choreo. by Igor Shpilband	S.O.S. d'un terrien en détresse (from Starmania) by Michel Berger & Luc Plamondon arranged by Maxime Rodriguez choreo. by Pasquale Camerlengo performed by Los Angeles: The Voices	Uninvited by Alanis Morissette; Land of a Thousand Dances by Wilson Pickett; Groove Me by King Floyd; I Wanna Dance with Somebody (Who Loves Me) by George Merrill, Shannon Rubicam choreo. by Kaitlyn Weaver, Andrew Poje, Sam Chouinard & Marie-France Dubreuil; Libertango by Astor Piazzolla choreo. by Igor Shpilband; S.O.S. d'un terrien en détresse (from Starmania) by Michel Berger & Luc Plamondon arranged by Maxime Rodriguez choreo. by Pasquale Camerlengo; Simple (Florida Georgia Line song) by Florida Georgia Line; Tennessee Whiskey by Dean Dillon and Linda Hargrove covered by Chris Stapleton choreo. by Pasquale Camerlengo; Applause by Lady Gaga choreo. by Serge Onik
2017–18	Bolero: Tango by Dianne Reeves; Mambo: Do You Only Wanna Dance performed by Julio Daivel Big Band feat. Cucco Peña choreo. by Nikolai Morozov	Je suis malade by Serge Lama performed by Lara Fabian; Adagio of Spartacus and Phrygia by Aram Khachaturian choreo. by Lori Nichol	Tennessee Whiskey by Dean Dillon and Linda Hargrove covered by Chris Stapleton; Applause by Lady Gaga choreo. by Serge Onik; Shape of You by Ed Sheeran; Where Is My Love by Cat Power; Frozen: The Great Thaw; Let It Go by Kristen Anderson-Lopez, Robert Lopez; Unchained Melody by Alex North, Hy Zaret; The Love Inside by Dave A. Stewart, Glen Ballard, Bruce Joel Rubin choreo. by Lori Nichol
2016–17	Blues: The Way You Make Me Feel by Michael Jackson covered by Judith Hill; Hip hop: Dangerous; Hip hop: Jam by Michael Jackson; Theme: Country swing: Blues: Black Velvet by Christopher Ward, David Tyson performed by Alannah Myles; Swing: Swingin' by John Anderson covered by LeAnn Rimes	Concierto de Aranjuez by Joaquín Rodrigo	Unchained Melody by Alex North, Hy Zaret; The Love Inside by Dave A. Stewart, Glen Ballard, Bruce Joel Rubin choreo. by Lori Nichol; Baby, It's Cold Outside by Frank Loesser; Michael Jackson medley: The Way You Make Me Feel covered by Judith Hill; Dangerous; Jam all songs by Michael Jackson; Get Low by Dillon Francis, DJ Snake
2015–16	Waltz: The Blue Danube; Polka: Annen-Polka, Op. 117; Waltz: The Blue Danube by Johann Strauss II; Waltz: Can't Help Falling in Love; Foxtrot: Heartbreak Hotel by Elvis Presley choreo. by Pasquale Camerlengo	This Bitter Earth; On the Nature of Daylight by Dinah Washington, Max Richter (mash-up); Run by Ludovico Einaudi choreo. by Peter Tchernyshev, Shae-Lynn Bourne	This Bitter Earth; On the Nature of Daylight by Dinah Washington, Max Richter; Get Low by Dillon Francis, DJ Snake; Elvis Presley medley: White Christmas by Irving Berlin performed by Elvis Presley; Heartbreak Hotel by Elvis Presley; Find You by Zedd; Kissing You by Des'ree choreo. by Shae-Lynn Bourne; Ly-O-Lay Ale Loya by Sacred Spirit choreo. by Massimo Scali
2014–15	Pasodoble: La Virgen de la Macarena choreo. by Pasquale Camerlengo	The Four Seasons by Antonio Vivaldi arranged by Max Richter: Spring; Summer 1; Summer 3; Winter choreo. by Shae-Lynn Bourne	Kissing You by Des'ree choreo. by Shae-Lynn Bourne; A Song for You by Donny Hathaway choreo. by Linda Garneau; My Favorite Things by Rodgers and Hammerstein; Hello; La Virgen de la Macarena choreo. by Pasquale Camerlengo
2013–14	Quickstep: 42nd Street – Finale by Harry Warren choreo. by Geoffrey Tyler	María de Buenos Aires by Gidon Kremer, Astor Piazzolla; Alevare; Yo soy María; Milonga de la Anunciación choreo. by Pasquale Camerlengo, Shae-Lynn Bourne	A Song for You by Donny Hathaway choreo. by Linda Garneau; María de Buenos Aires by Astor Piazzolla; Try by Pink; Ly-O-Lay Ale Loya by Sacred Spirit choreo. by Massimo Scali
2012–13	The Sound of Music by Rodgers & Hammerstein; Waltz: Edelweiss; Polka: Do Re Mi; Waltz: Favorite Things; Polka: Do Re Mi	Humanity in Motion by Nathan Lanier choreo. by Allison Holker	Je suis malade by Serge Lama performed by Lara Fabian; Shake It Out by Florence and the Machine
2011–12	Historia de un Amor (Rhumba) by Pérez Prado; Batacuda (Samba) by DJ Dero	Je suis malade by Serge Lama performed by Lara Fabian arranged by Karl Hugo	Je suis malade by Serge Lama performed by Lara Fabian; Shake It Out by Florence and the Machine; Vole by Celine Dion; The Prayer by Josh Groban, Charlotte Church; Steppin' Out with My Baby by Irving Berlin
2010–11	At Last by Etta James; Cheek to Cheek by Irving Berlin	Moulin Rouge!; Sparkling Diamonds; Come What May; El Tango de Roxanne	I Love Rock 'n' Roll by Joan Jett
	Original dance		
2009–10	Spanish Flamenco by unknown	Phantasia by Andrew Lloyd Webber choreo. by Shae-Lynn Bourne, Pasquale Camerlengo	The Prayer by Josh Groban, Charlotte Church
2008–09	Swing Brother Swing; Harlem Nocturne by Conrad Korsch, Jonathan Smith	Dr. Zhivago Suite by Maurice Jarre	The Prayer by Josh Groban, Charlotte Church
2007–08	Dorogoi Dlinnoyu (Those Were The Days) by Martin Lass	Blues for Klook by Eddy Louiss	Dorogoi Dlinnoyu (Those Were The Days) by Martin Lass
2006–07	Jeanne y Paul by Astor Piazzolla; Verano Porteno from The Story of Tango by Raul Garello	One Fine Day (from Madama Butterfly) by Giacomo Puccini	A Sunday Kind of Love by Etta James

== Competitive highlights ==
=== Ice dance with Kaitlyn Weaver ===
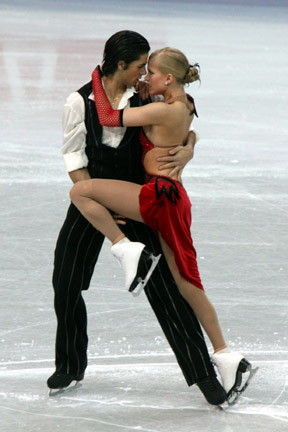
Weaver and Poje during the compulsory dance at the 2008 World Championships

- GP – Event of the ISU Grand Prix Series
- JGP – Event of the ISU Junior Grand Prix Series
- CS – Event of the ISU Challenger Series
- WD – Withdrew from competition

Competition placements at senior level
Season	2006–07	2007–08	2008–09	2009–10	2010–11	2011–12	2012–13	2013–14	2014–15	2015–16	2016–17	2017–18	2018–19
Winter Olympics								7th				7th	
World Championships	20th	17th			5th	4th	5th	2nd	3rd	5th	4th	3rd	5th
Four Continents Championships		5th	5th	1st	4th	3rd			1st	3rd	5th		2nd
Grand Prix Final					5th	4th		5th	1st	1st			
Canadian Championships	3rd	2nd	3rd	3rd	2nd	2nd	WD	2nd	1st	1st	2nd	3rd	1st
World Team Trophy							2nd (2nd)		4th (1st)		4th (1st)		5th (4th)
GP Cup of China			6th	6th			3rd				2nd		
GP France		7th										4th	
GP NHK Trophy			7th		2nd	2nd			1st				
GP Rostelecom Cup						2nd		2nd		1st	3rd		
GP Skate America					4th		3rd						
GP Skate Canada		6th		3rd		2nd		2nd	1st	1st		2nd	
CS Autumn Classic												2nd	1st
CS Finlandia Trophy										1st			
CS Nebelhorn Trophy									1st				
CS Ondrej Nepela Trophy							1st						
CS U.S. Classic								2nd					
Team Challenge Cup										1st (1st)			

Competition placements at junior level
Season	2006–07
World Junior Championships	3rd
JGP Taiwan	3rd
JGP Czech Republic	3rd

=== Ice dance with Alexandra Nino ===
Competition placements at junior level
Season	2001–02	2002–03	2003–04
JGP Poland			5th
JGP Serbia		7th	
Canadian Championships	9th	6th	4th

== Detailed results ==
=== Ice dance with Kaitlyn Weaver ===
ISU personal best scores in the +5/-5 GOE System
Segment	Type	Score	Event
Total	TSS	205.62	2019 World Championships
Rhythm dance	TSS	82.84	2019 World Championships
Rhythm dance	TES	45.24	2019 World Championships
Rhythm dance	PCS	37.60	2019 World Championships
Free dance	TSS	124.18	2019 World Team Trophy
Free dance	TES	68.79	2019 World Team Trophy
Free dance	PCS	56.08	2019 Four Continents Championships

ISU personal bests in the +3/-3 GOE System (from 2010–11)
Segment	Type	Score	Event
Total	TSS	192.35	2018 World Championships
Short dance	TSS	78.31	2018 World Championships
Short dance	TES	41.14	2018 World Championships
Short dance	PCS	37.31	2015–16 Grand Prix Final
Free dance	TSS	114.04	2018 World Championships
Free dance	TES	57.90	2017 Skate Canada International
Free dance	PCS	56.47	2018 World Championships

- Small medals for the short program and free skating are only awarded at ISU Championships.
- Medals at team events are awarded for the team results only. Individual placements at team events are listed in parentheses.

==== Senior level ====
Results in the 2006–07 season
Date	Event	CD		OD		FD		Total	
Date	Event	P	Score	P	Score	P	Score	P	Score
Oct 15–18, 2006	2006 JGP Czech Republic	5	27.30	2	47.30	2	67.58	3	142.18
Oct 19–22, 2006	(Taiwan) 2006 JGP Chinese Taipei	3	29.34	3	46.12	3	64.62	3	140.08
Jan 15–21, 2007	(Canada) 2007 Canadian Championships	7	27.07	3	49.84	3	83.74	3	160.65
Feb 26 – Mar 4, 2007	(Germany) 2007 World Junior Championships	6	30.43	4	49.03	2	72.05	3	151.51
Mar 20–25, 2007	(Japan) 2007 World Championships	18	25.76	23	42.58	20	71.80	20	140.14

Results in the 2007–08 season
Date	Event	CD		OD		FD		Total	
Date	Event	P	Score	P	Score	P	Score	P	Score
Nov 1–4, 2007	2007 Skate Canada International	8	25.07	8	45.74	5	77.96	6	148.77
Nov 15–18, 2007	(France) 2007 Trophée Éric Bompard	7	27.47	7	46.99	6	79.74	7	196.89
Jan 16–20, 2008	(Canada) 2008 Canadian Championships	3	32.54	2	55.60	4	87.47	2	175.61
Feb 11–17, 2008	(South Korea) 2008 Four Continents Championships	5	30.94	5	55.95	4	88.47	5	174.36
Mar 16–23, 2008	(Sweden) 2008 World Championships	20	27.74	17	48.62	17	78.48	17	154.84

Results in the 2008–09 season
Date	Event	CD		OD		FD		Total	
Date	Event	P	Score	P	Score	P	Score	P	Score
Nov 5–9, 2008	2008 Cup of China	6	29.91	6	48.77	6	78.52	6	157.20
Nov 27–30, 2008	(Japan) 2008 NHK Trophy	7	28.70	7	46.58	7	80.36	7	151.10
Jan 14–18, 2009	(Canada) 2009 Canadian Championships	5	31.69	3	52.92	2	85.42	3	170.23
Feb 2–8, 2009	(Canada) 2009 Four Continents Championships	5	30.62	5	53.33	5	84.81	5	168.76

Results in the 2009–10 season
Date	Event	CD		OD		FD		Total	
Date	Event	P	Score	P	Score	P	Score	P	Score
Oct 29 – Nov 1, 2009	2009 Cup of China	5	30.40	9	41.11	4	80.36	6	151.87
Nov 19–22, 2009	2009 Skate Canada International	3	32.18	4	51.18	4	82.28	3	165.64
Jan 11–17, 2010	(Canada) 2010 Canadian Championships	3	36.87	2	57.92	3	89.61	3	184.40
Jan 27–30, 2010	(South Korea) 2010 Four Continents Championships	1	32.67	3	48.42	1	85.07	1	166.16

Results in the 2010–11 season
Date	Event	SD		FD		Total	
Date	Event	P	Score	P	Score	P	Score
Oct 22–24, 2010	(Japan) 2010 NHK Trophy	2	58.69	3	82.88	2	136.93
Nov 11–14, 2010	(United States) 2010 Skate America	3	59.48	4	82.86	4	142.34
Dec 8–12, 2010	(China) 2010–11 Grand Prix Final	4	55.51	5	80.83	5	136.34
Jan 17–23, 2011	(Canada) 2011 Canadian Championships	2	65.64	2	97.54	2	153.90
Feb 15–20, 2011	(Taiwan) 2011 Four Continents Championships	3	65.45	4	85.69	4	151.14
Apr 24 – May 1, 2011	(Russia) 2011 World Championships	7	65.07	4	92.57	5	160.32

Results in the 2011–12 season
Date	Event	SD		FD		Total	
Date	Event	P	Score	P	Score	P	Score
Oct 27–30, 2011	2011 Skate Canada International	2	63.31	3	92.68	2	155.99
Nov 10–13, 2011	(Japan) 2011 NHK Trophy	2	60.07	2	91.69	2	151.76
Nov 24–27, 2011	(Russia) 2011 Rostelecom Cup	2	64.45	2	96.73	2	161.18
Dec 8–11, 2011	(Canada) 2011–12 Grand Prix Final	4	66.24	4	99.83	4	166.07
Jan 16–22, 2012	(Canada) 2012 Canadian Championships	2	68.27	2	106.26	2	174.53
Feb 7–12, 2012	(United States) 2012 Four Continents Championships	3	64.23	3	99.03	3	163.26
Mar 26 – Apr 1, 2012	(France) 2012 World Championships	4	66.47	4	100.18	4	166.65

Results in the 2012–13 season
Date	Event	SD		FD		Total	
Date	Event	P	Score	P	Score	P	Score
Oct 3–7, 2012	(Slovakia) 2012 Ondrej Nepela Memorial	1	63.77	1	97.61	1	161.38
Oct 19–21, 2012	(United States) 2012 Skate America	2	65.79	3	91.53	3	157.32
Nov 2–4, 2012	2012 Cup of China	2	65.59	3	93.38	3	158.97
Mar 10–17, 2013	(Canada) 2013 World Championships	6	67.54	5	98.66	5	166.20
Apr 11–14, 2013	(Japan) 2013 World Team Trophy	2	62.42	2	97.66	2 (2)	160.08

Results in the 2013–14 season
Date	Event	SD		FD		Total	
Date	Event	P	Score	P	Score	P	Score
Sep 12–14, 2013	(United States) 2013 U.S. International Classic	2	62.61	2	99.38	2	161.99
Oct 25–27, 2013	2013 Skate Canada International	2	70.35	2	104.88	2	175.23
Nov 22–24, 2013	(Russia) 2013 Rostelecom Cup	2	61.50	1	101.64	2	153.37
Dec 5–8, 2013	(Japan) 2013–14 Grand Prix Final	4	67.68	5	97.36	5	165.04
Jan 9–15, 2014	(Canada) 2014 Canadian Championships	2	72.68	5	110.86	2	183.54
Feb 6–22, 2014	(Russia) 2014 Winter Olympics	7	65.93	5	103.18	7	169.11
Mar 24–30, 2014	(Japan) 2014 World Championships	2	69.20	3	106.21	2	175.41

Results in the 2014–15 season
Date	Event	SD		FD		Total	
Date	Event	P	Score	P	Score	P	Score
Sep 24–27, 2014	(Germany) 2014 CS Nebelhorn Trophy	1	65.59	2	99.73	1	165.32
Oct 31 – Nov 2, 2014	2014 Skate Canada International	1	68.61	1	102.49	1	171.10
Nov 28–30, 2014	(Japan) 2014 NHK Trophy	1	67.51	1	101.91	1	169.42
Dec 11–14, 2014	(Spain) 2014–15 Grand Prix Final	1	71.34	1	109.80	1	181.14
Jan 19–25, 2015	(Canada) 2015 Canadian Championships	1	76.26	1	111.62	1	187.88
Feb 9–15, 2015	(South Korea) 2015 Four Continents Championships	3	68.31	1	109.15	1	177.46
Mar 23–29, 2015	(China) 2015 World Championships	2	72.68	3	106.74	3	179.42
Apr 16–19, 2015	(Japan) 2015 World Team Trophy	1	73.14	2	109.79	4 (1)	182.93

Results in the 2015–16 season
Date	Event	SD		FD		Total	
Date	Event	P	Score	P	Score	P	Score
Oct 9–11, 2015	(Finland) 2015 CS Finlandia Trophy	1	65.13	1	96.54	1	161.67
Oct 30 – Nov 1, 2015	2015 Skate Canada International	1	68.00	1	105.79	1	173.79
Nov 20–22, 2015	(Russia) 2015 Rostelecom Cup	1	69.49	1	104.09	1	173.58
Dec 10–13, 2015	(Spain) 2015–16 Grand Prix Final	1	72.75	1	109.91	1	182.66
Jan 18–24, 2016	(Canada) 2016 Canadian Championships	1	76.20	1	115.53	1	191.73
Feb 16–21, 2016	(Taiwan) 2016 Four Continents Championships	2	72.42	4	101.43	3	173.85
Mar 28 – Apr 3, 2016	(United States) 2016 World Championships	4	71.83	5	110.18	5	182.01
Apr 22–24, 2016	(United States) 2016 Team Challenge Cup	–	–	1	111.56	1 (1)	–

Results in the 2016–17 season
Date	Event	SD		FD		Total	
Date	Event	P	Score	P	Score	P	Score
Nov 4–6, 2016	(Russia) 2016 Rostelecom Cup	3	69.81	2	108.76	3	178.57
Nov 18–20, 2016	2016 Cup of China	1	73.78	2	107.76	2	181.54
Jan 16–22, 2017	(Canada) 2017 Canadian Championships	2	78.92	2	113.98	2	192.90
Feb 15–19, 2017	(South Korea) 2017 Four Continents Championships	5	71.15	4	108.94	5	180.09
Mar 29 – Apr 2, 2017	(Finland) 2017 World Championships	6	74.84	6	109.97	4	184.81
Apr 20–23, 2017	(Japan) 2017 World Team Trophy	2	76.73	1	113.83	4 (1)	190.56

Results in the 2017–18 season
Date	Event	SD		FD		Total	
Date	Event	P	Score	P	Score	P	Score
Sep 20–23, 2017	(Canada) 2017 CS Autumn Classic International	2	69.32	2	104.24	2	173.56
Oct 27–29, 2017	2017 Skate Canada International	2	77.47	3	112.54	2	190.01
Nov 17–19, 2017	2017 Internationaux de France	5	68.94	3	108.03	4	176.97
Jan 8–14, 2018	(Canada) 2018 Canadian Championships	4	70.31	2	120.78	3	191.09
Feb 9–25, 2018	(South Korea) 2018 Winter Olympics	8	74.33	7	107.65	7	181.98
Mar 21–24, 2018	(Italy) 2018 World Championships	3	78.31	4	114.04	3	192.35

Results in the 2018–19 season
Date	Event	RD		FD		Total	
Date	Event	P	Score	P	Score	P	Score
Sep 20–22, 2018	(Canada) 2018 CS Autumn Classic International	1	76.53	1	120.74	1	197.27
Jan 13–20, 2019	(Canada) 2019 Canadian Championships	1	85.19	2	128.59	1	213.78
Feb 7–10, 2019	(United States) 2019 Four Continents Championships	3	80.56	3	123.37	2	203.93
Mar 18–24, 2019	(Japan) 2019 World Championships	5	82.84	5	122.78	5	205.62
Apr 11–14, 2019	(Japan) 2019 World Team Trophy	5	79.60	4	124.18	5 (4)	203.78
