= Mary H. Wright Elementary School =

- Wright, Mary H., Elementary School
- U.S. National Register of Historic Places
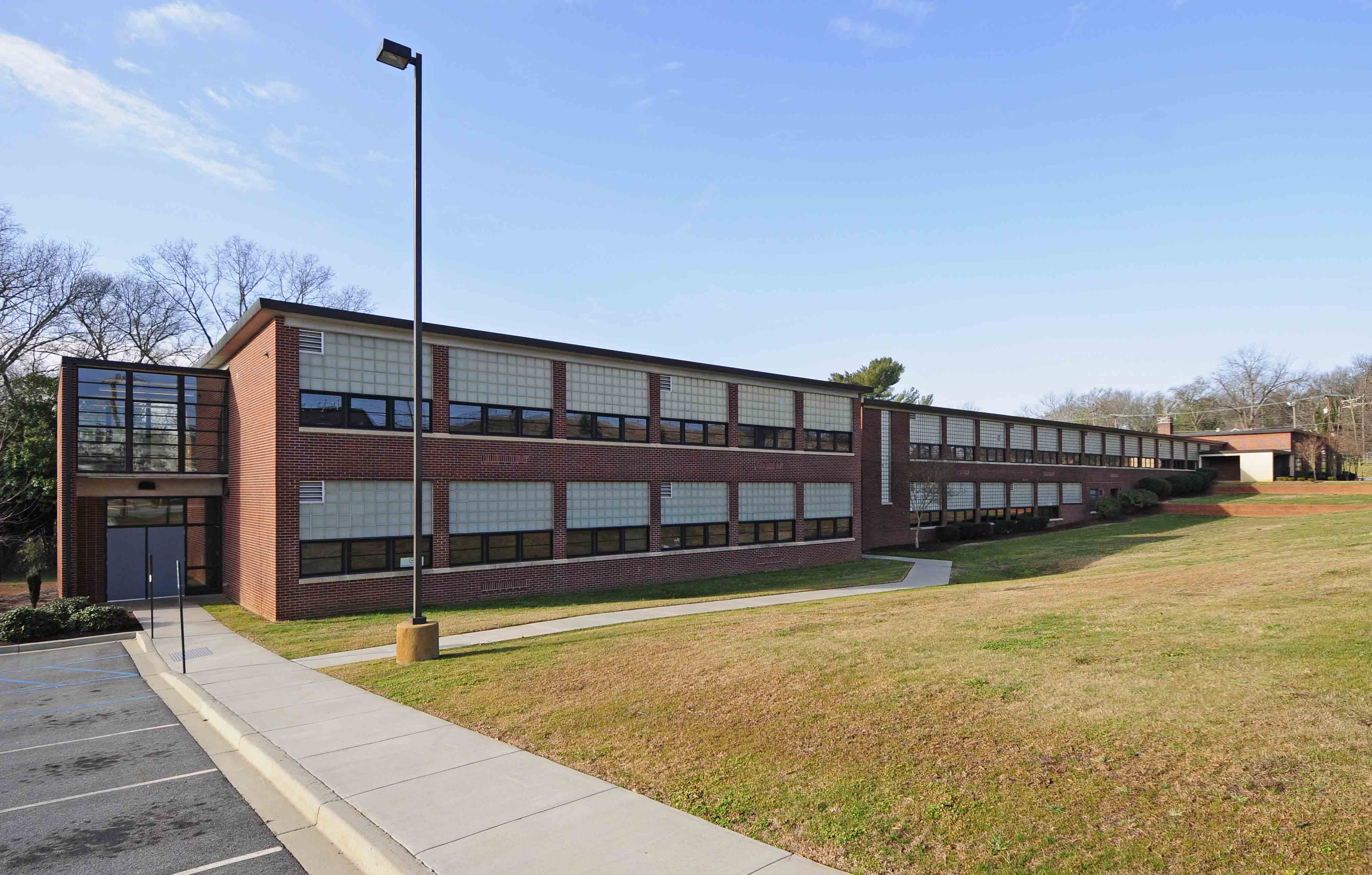

- Location within South Carolina
- Location: 201 Caulder Ave., Spartanburg, South Carolina
- Coordinates: 34°56′05″N 81°55′35″W
- Area: 8.9 acres (3.6 ha)
- Built: 1951
- Architect: Hudson, W. Manchester; Chapman, A. Hugh Jr.
- Architectural style: International Style
- NRHP reference No.: 07000798
- Added to NRHP: August 3, 2007

Mary H. Wright Elementary School is a former school building in Spartanburg, South Carolina. It was constructed in 1951 as part of SC Governor James F. Byrnes's attempt to establish "separate but equal" facilities in order to avoid desegregation of schools. After integration, it continued to serve as an elementary school until 2001, when a new school of the same name was constructed nearby. The building served as a learning center and then a housing authority office over the next several years until it was left vacant in 2016. In 2022, it was renovated into Schoolhouse Lofts, a 53-unit apartment development. It is named after Mary Honor Farrow Wright.

It was named to the National Register of Historic Places on August 3, 2007.
