= Selena Zhao =

Canadian figure skater

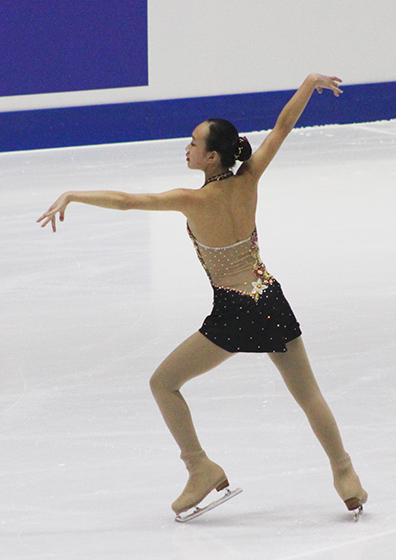
- Zhao in 2015

Personal information
- Born: 10 May 1998 (age 28) Kirkland, Washington

Figure skating career
- Country: Canada
- Coach: Christy Krall, Damon Allen
- Skating club: Varennes FSC Quebec

Selena Zhao (born 10 May 1998) is a Canadian competitive figure skater. She was the 2015 Women's Singles Canadian Junior Champion.

== Personal life and education ==
Zhao was born in the United States and is a dual American and Canadian citizen. Her parents were born in Beijing, China before emigrating to Vancouver, where her father earned his PhD. The family later moved to Ottawa, where Zhao's older brother, Davis, was born, and eventually settled in Kirkland, Washington for Zhao's father's job work. Zhao was born in 1998.

In 2012, Zhao moved to Chicago, before relocating to Colorado Springs in 2013, where she trained from 2013-2016. During this time, she attended Cheyenne Mountain High School as a top student in her classes, winning a department award in mathematics. Zhao went on to study political science and biology at Harvard University as a member of the Class of 2020. She also performs in the annual cancer research fundraiser show An Evening with Champions.

== Career ==
=== Early career ===
Zhao began skating at the age of four. She landed her first triple at the age of twelve and mastered all of them a year later.

In the 2008-2009 season, Zhao won her regional competition and qualified for the U.S. Junior Figure Skating Championships on the juvenile level, placing 9th. A year later, at the intermediate level, she again won regionals and qualified for the U.S. Junior Figure Skating Championships on the intermediate level. The following season, she repeated the regional title at the intermediate level and made her third time consecutive appearance at the U.S. Junior Figure Skating Championships.

In the 2011-12 season, Zhao won regionals at the novice level by 21.07 points and placed fourth at sectionals, to qualify for the 2012 U.S. Figure Skating Championships, where she finished seventh.

For the 2012-13 season, Zhao moved to Chicago to train with Kori Ade and Rohene Ward, coaches of 2014 US Olympian Jason Brown. She won the inaugural US Challenge Skate at the junior level, ahead of Polina Edmunds. Zhao won regionals by 45.37 points but placed 5th at sectionals, missing qualification for the 2013 U.S. Figure Skating Championships.

Zhao began working with coaches Christy Krall and Damon Allen, at the age of fourteen, prior to the 2013-14 season. but again missed the 2014 U.S. Figure Skating Championships after placing 5th at sectionals.

=== 2014-2015 season ===
Zhao made her international debut on the ISU Junior Grand Prix during the 2014-15 figure skating season, representing Canada. Zhao finished 10th at her JGP event in Ljubljana, Slovenia and 9th at her JGP event in Dresden, Germany.

At the 2015 Canadian Junior Championships, Zhao overcame a foot injury sustained while training a triple-triple jump combination to win the gold medal by 13.34 points.

This earned her a spot for the 2015 World Junior Figure Skating Championships where placed 26th while competing with the flu.

=== 2015-2016 season ===
Zhao made her senior debut at the 2015 U.S. International Classic, where she placed 5th.

== Programs ==
Season	Short program	Free skating
2015–2016	Moon River by Henry Mancini performed by John Bayless and Nancy LaMott choreo. by Tom Dickson	Violin Fantasy on Puccini's Turandot by Vanessa-Mae choreo. by Tom Dickson
2014–2015	Milonga del Angel; Concierto para Quinteto by Astor Piazzolla choreo. by Tom Dickson	Brazil by Michael Kamen choreo. by Tom Dickson

== Competitive highlights ==
International
Event	2014–15	2015–16
CS U.S. Classic		5th
International: Junior
Junior Worlds	26th	
JGP Germany	9th	
JGP Slovenia	10th	
National
Canadian Championships	1st J.	
TBD = Assigned; WD = Withdrew; Levels: J. = Junior; JGP = Junior Grand Prix
