= 2013 ISU World Team Trophy in Figure Skating =

2013 World Team Trophy
- Type: ISU Event
- Date: April 11 – 14
- Season: 2012–13
- Location: Tokyo, Japan
- Host: Japan Skating Federation
- Venue: Yoyogi National Gymnasium
- Previous: 2012 ISU World Team Trophy
- Next: 2015 ISU World Team Trophy

The 2013 ISU World Team Trophy was an international team figure skating competition in the 2012–13 season. Participating countries selected two men's single skaters, two ladies' single skaters, one pair and one ice dancing entry to compete in a team format with points based on the skaters' placement.

== Entries ==
Country	Men	Ladies	Pairs	Ice dancing
Canada	Patrick Chan; Kevin Reynolds	Gabrielle Daleman; Kaetlyn Osmond	Meagan Duhamel / Eric Radford	Kaitlyn Weaver / Andrew Poje
China	Wang Yi; Yan Han	Li Zijun; Zhang Kexin	Peng Cheng / Zhang Hao	Yu Xiaoyang / Wang Chen
France	Brian Joubert; Romain Ponsart	Lénaëlle Gilleron-Gorry; Maé-Bérénice Méité	Vanessa James / Morgan Ciprès	Pernelle Carron / Lloyd Jones
Japan	Takahito Mura; Daisuke Takahashi	Mao Asada; Akiko Suzuki	None	Cathy Reed / Chris Reed
Russia	Maxim Kovtun; Konstantin Menshov	Adelina Sotnikova; Elizaveta Tuktamysheva	Tatiana Volosozhar / Maxim Trankov	Ksenia Monko / Kirill Khaliavin
United States	Max Aaron; Jeremy Abbott	Gracie Gold; Ashley Wagner	Marissa Castelli / Simon Shnapir	Madison Chock / Evan Bates

== Overview ==
Six countries qualified for the event: Canada (7824 points), the United States (7156), Japan (6823), Russia (6648), France (4826), and China (4702). Japan had no pair entry due to the split of Narumi Takahashi / Mervin Tran. There were several changes to the initial roster. Ekaterina Bobrova / Dmitri Soloviev withdrew due to an injury to Soloviev and Ksenia Monko / Kirill Khaliavin were named in their place. Nathalie Péchalat / Fabian Bourzat were replaced by Pernelle Carron / Lloyd Jones, Florent Amodio by Romain Ponsart, and Song Nan by Wang Yi.

Japan and the United States were tied with 47 points each after the first day of competition, with Russia in third. Madison Chock / Evan Bates, Patrick Chan, and Adelina Sotnikova were the leaders in the short dance, men's, and ladies' short programs, respectively. The second day featured the pair's short program, free dance, and men's free skating. Tatiana Volosozhar / Maxim Trankov took the lead in pairs, while Daisuke Takahashi and Chock / Bates won the men's and dance free programs respectively. Konstantin Menshov, third after the short program, withdrew after dislocating his right shoulder attempting a triple Axel in the free skating. The United States moved into the lead with 55 points, Canada rose to second place (50), and Japan slipped to third (48).

The third and final day of competition features the pairs' and ladies' free skating.

== Results ==
=== Team standings ===
Rank	Nation	Total team points
1	United States	57
2	Canada	51
3	Japan	49
4	Russia	39
5	China	35
6	France	31

=== Men ===
Rank	Name	Nation	Total points	SP		FS		Team points
1	Daisuke Takahashi	Japan	249.52	2	80.87	1	168.65	12
2	Patrick Chan	Canada	240.21	1	86.67	5	153.54	11
3	Kevin Reynolds	Canada	237.65	9	73.52	2	164.13	10
4	Max Aaron	United States	236.62	6	77.38	3	159.24	9
5	Takahito Mura	Japan	233.68	5	77.65	4	156.03	8
6	Jeremy Abbott	United States	231.84	4	80.24	6	151.60	7
7	Brian Joubert	France	227.95	8	76.55	7	151.40	6
8	Maxim Kovtun	Russia	221.79	7	76.67	8	145.12	5
9	Yan Han	China	207.81	10	64.54	9	143.27	4
10	Wang Yi	China	183.57	11	58.30	10	125.27	3
11	Romain Ponsart	France	165.59	12	57.39	11	108.20	2
WD	Konstantin Menshov	Russia		3	80.60			

=== Ladies ===
Rank	Name	Nation	Total points	SP		FS		Team points
1	Akiko Suzuki	Japan	199.58	2	66.56	1	133.02	12
2	Ashley Wagner	United States	188.60	4	59.77	2	128.83	11
3	Gracie Gold	United States	188.03	3	60.98	3	127.05	10
4	Adelina Sotnikova	Russia	183.10	1	67.13	6	115.97	9
5	Mao Asada	Japan	177.36	5	59.39	5	117.97	8
6	Li Zijun	China	171.50	9	53.16	4	118.34	7
7	Kaetlyn Osmond	Canada	164.85	7	55.18	7	109.67	6
8	Maé-Bérénice Méité	France	159.71	6	58.51	9	101.20	5
9	Zhang Kexin	China	155.49	8	54.97	10	100.52	4
10	Elizaveta Tuktamysheva	Russia	152.16	10	49.94	8	102.22	3
11	Gabrielle Daleman	Canada	140.82	12	48.82	11	92.00	2
12	Lénaëlle Gilleron-Gorry	France	121.80	11	49.41	12	72.39	1

=== Pairs ===
Rank	Name	Nation	Total points	SP		FS		Team points
1	Tatiana Volosozhar / Maxim Trankov	Russia	210.47	1	74.41	1	136.06	12
2	Meagan Duhamel / Eric Radford	Canada	191.15	2	69.94	2	121.21	11
3	Peng Cheng / Zhang Hao	China	174.40	4	58.62	3	115.78	10
4	Vanessa James / Morgan Ciprès	France	174.31	3	58.73	4	115.58	9
5	Marissa Castelli / Simon Shnapir	United States	172.30	5	57.18	5	115.12	8

=== Ice dancing ===
Rank	Name	Nation	Total points	SD		FD		Team points
1	Madison Chock / Evan Bates	United States	164.91	1	66.54	1	98.37	12
2	Kaitlyn Weaver / Andrew Poje	Canada	160.08	2	62.42	2	97.66	11
3	Ksenia Monko / Kirill Khaliavin	Russia	149.27	3	59.47	3	89.80	10
4	Cathy Reed / Chris Reed	Japan	141.75	4	56.35	4	85.40	9
5	Pernelle Carron / Lloyd Jones	France	138.97	5	54.73	5	84.24	8
6	Yu Xiaoyang / Wang Chen	China	113.76	6	45.15	6	68.61	7

== Prize money ==
Placement	Prize money per team
1st	200,000
2nd	170,000
3rd	160,000
4th	150,000
5th	140,000
6th	130,000
Total prize money: $1,000,000 USD
