= Mary Honor Farrow Wright =

African-american educator and civic leader

Mary Honor Farrow Wright (August 11, 1862 – August 25, 1946) was a pioneering African American educator and civic leader in Spartanburg, South Carolina, whose work advanced educational opportunities for black children during the post-reconstruction and Jim Crow eras.

== Early life and education ==
Born and raised in Spartanburg's historic North of Main neighborhood, Wright was shaped by a spiritual upbringing and a strong family commitment to education and public service. She graduated from Claflin University and spent her career teaching and mentoring generations of segregated school students across Spartanburg County.

== Career and community impact ==
Wright dedicated much of her life to teaching and other educational leadership in Spartanburg. She was known for her commitment in improving access to quality education, especially to underserved communities. Her work extended beyond the classroom, as she participated in civic initiatives which was focused on strengthening neighborhood ties and improving social welfare.

Her influence was notable in the North of Main neighborhood, where her family home, named the Lot Farrow Home, stood as a symbol of historical and cultural significance. The home was relocated to preserve its legacy, it reflected the community's recognition of Mary Honor Farrow Wright's enduring impact.

== Legacy and honors ==
The Mary H. Wright Elementary School in Spartanburg bears her name, serving as a lasting tribute to her dedication to learning and community uplift. The school is listed in the South Carolina Statewide Survey of Historic Properties, highlighting its culture and historical importance.

Her life and work have been documented in various scholarly and public history projects including the South Carolina Encyclopedia, South Carolina Public Radio's educational programming, and publications such as 101 Women Who Shaped South Carolina.
