= Snow Petrel Peak =

Mountain in Ross Dependency, Antarctica

Coordinates: 78°32′S 164°38′E

Snow Petrel Peak is a sharp rock peak marking the easternmost summit of Mason Spur at the northeast end of Hillary Coast, Ross Dependency in Antarctica. Snow Petrel Peak appears in a 1987 sketch map and report by geologist Anne Wright-Grassham, (earlier Anne C. Wright), who was a member of the 1983-1984 New Mexico Institute of Mining and Technology field party to Mason Spur. The name Snow Petrel Peak may come from a story about a pair of nesting snow petrels seen flying around the peak over several days in November 1983. Its elevation is 605 meters.
