= Anne Wright (historian) =

Scottish historian (1924–1981)

Anne Margaret Chaloner Wright (20 July 1924 – April 1981) was a Scottish lecturer in modern history and warden at the University of St Andrews. Wright was the only female lecturer in the department of Modern History at that time: Doris Ketelbey had retired in 1958, and Margaret Lambert had left in 1960.

== Early life ==
Anne Margaret Chaloner Wright was born on 20 July 1924 in St Andrews, where she was also educated. Her father was John N. Wright, a University of St Andrews staff member. Wright graduated in 1946 from the University of St Andrews with an MA Honours in History.

Four years after her graduation, she worked with a Church of Scotland organisation that had provided 'Huts and Canteens’' during the war; she ran a hostel in post-war Berlin for members of the forces and their wives. After returning from Berlin, Wright spent almost twenty years as a secondary school teacher. She trained in Dundee and taught around London in 1950, before returning to St Andrews in 1961, likely due to her mother’s poor health. Wright taught around Fife, Tayside, and in St Andrews at St Leonard’s School and at Grove Academy until in 1966, when she became warden of Hamilton Hall in St Andrews.

== Career ==
The role of warden combined administrative duties with teaching roles. Wright was appointed as a lecturer in the department of Modern History due to her degree and teaching experience in History. Wright was warden of Hamilton Hall and taught in the department of Modern History until her death in 1981.

== Death and legacy ==
Wright died of cancer in April 1981, at the age of 56. Wright’s colleagues and former students set up the Anne Wright scholarship for postgraduate research in Arts, and an Anne Wright Memorial Fund for the students of the University.
