= Anne Wright (author) =

British author (1793–1961)

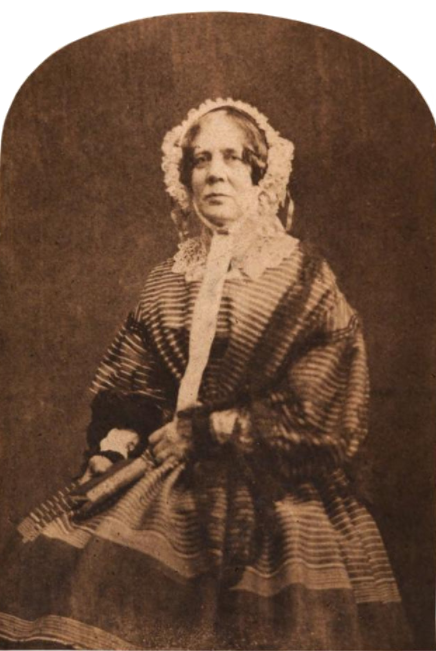
- Portrait of Anne Wright
- Born: 1793; Calverton, Buckinghamshire
- Died: 18 January 1861 (aged 67–68); Blakeney, Norfolk
- Spouse: John Wright

Anne Wright (1793 – 18 January 1861) was a British writer, most notably of children's books about natural sciences. Her most well-known work was originally published as a series of letters and later compiled into one volume, titled The Observing Eye, or Letters to Children on the Three Lowest Divisions of Animal Life (1851).

== Biography ==
=== Personal life ===
Anne Wright was born in 1793 in Middlesex. In 1816 she married John Wright, whose uncle is known for launching the first sea-going steamboat. Most of her writing was complete from a farm in Buxton, Norfolk, where she was a very active participant in the community. Wright had two children, Jonathon and Fredrick. She died on 18 January 1861, in Blakeney, Norfolk.

=== Writing ===
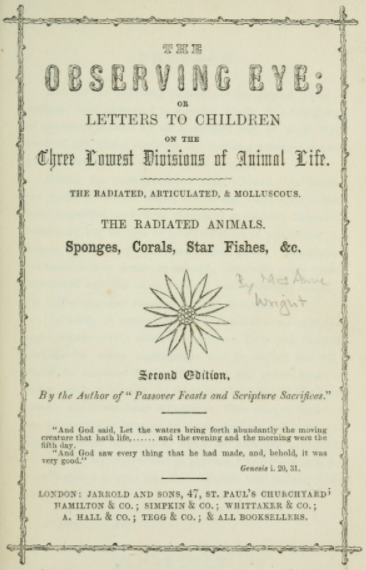
Title page of The Observing Eye

Anne Wright's most well-known work during her time was The Observing Eye. It received great critical acclaim, a geologist, Hugh Miller, saying "[The Observing Eye] is quite a model of the way in which the study of living nature ought to be brought before the minds of children." In fact, this work was chosen by Queen Victoria to be in the collection that was to be read by the royal children. Wright herself took an interest in geology, sometimes gathering and studying different specimens. Several of her works involved the geology and other natural sciences:

- Our World: Its Rocks and Fossils (1859)
- The Globe Prepared for Man: A Guide to Geology (1853)
- What is a Bird? The Forms of Birds – Their Instincts – and Use in Creation Considered (1857)

=== Community involvement ===
Wright was an active participant in her neighborhood. She was a figure often present at the local school, and "Mrs. Wright's Stories" drew a lot of interest from the children. In 1853, Wright's husband John established a reformatory in their own neighborhood; Anne Wright was very enthusiastic about helping reform the inmates through instruction.

== Selected works ==
- Listen and Learn: A Short Narrative of a Three Days' Ramble
- The Observing Eye, or Letters to Children on the Three Lowest Divisions of Animal Life (1851)
- Passover Feasts and Scripture Sacrifices (1852)
- The Globe Prepared for Man: A Guide to Geology (1853)
- What is a Bird? The Forms of Birds – Their Instincts – and Use in Creation Considered (1857)
- Our World: Its Rocks and Fossils (1859)
