= Clara Campbell =

American politician

Clara Permilia Little Campbell (February 12, 1846 – December 16, 1931) was a state legislator in Idaho. Born in Somers, Connecticut, she married American Civil War veteran William Orlando Campbell in 1867 and they moved to Eugene, Oregon where her husband became superintendent for the Indian school at the Nez Perce Reservation in northern Idaho. They later moved to Moscow, Idaho and then Boise, Idaho. She was one of the first women to serve in the Idaho House of Representatives. She was a Republican.

Women were allowed to vote in Idaho in 1896. Two years later, Campbell, Harriet Noble and Mary Allen Wright became the first women elected to the Idaho House. They were photographed. A plaque in a hallway commemorating their achievements was moved to the Idaho Capitol's rotunda after a letter from a fourth grader.

She represented Ada County, Idaho along with representatives S. M. C. Reynolds, C. B. Kingsley, and O. W. Hall as well as Senator C. M. Hays, all Republicans.
