= Mary Allen Wright =

American politician

Member of the Idaho House of Representatives
- In office 1898–1900

Personal details
- Born: Mary Allen; December 3, 1868 Polk Township, Nodaway County, Missouri, U.S.
- Died: March 31, 1948 (aged 79) Bonners Ferry, Idaho, U.S.
- Party: Populist
- Spouse: George G. Wright (m. 1887; div. 1904)

Mary Allen Wright (December 3, 1868 – March 31, 1948) was an American politician who was one of the first three women elected to the Idaho Legislature.She represented Kootenai County. She served three terms in the Idaho House of Representatives as a member of the Populist Caucus from 1899 to 1905. She was elected as leader of the Populist caucus, becoming the first woman to lead a party in any state legislature, as well as the first female nominee for the speakership.
