= 2011 Nebelhorn Trophy =

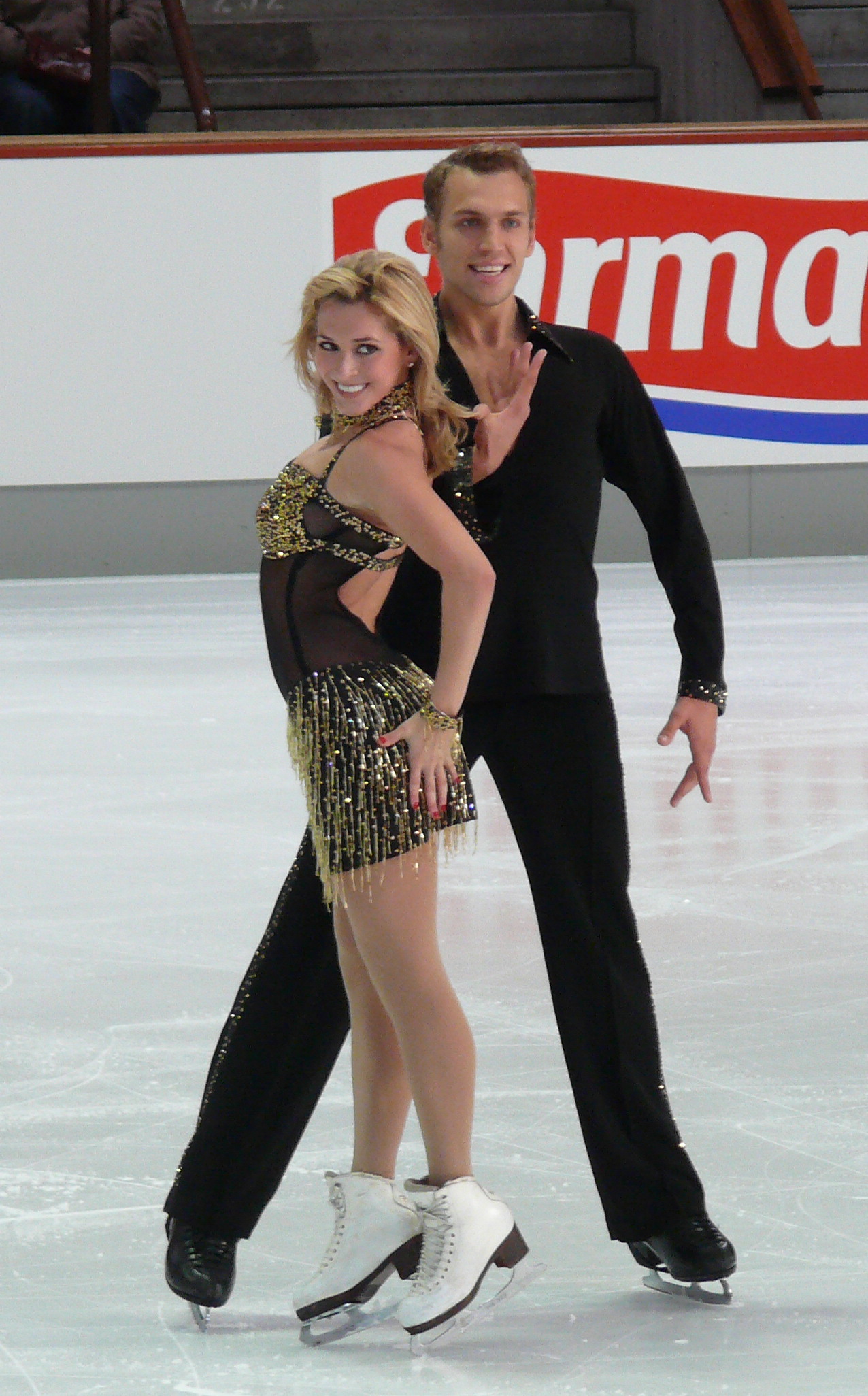
- Type: Senior International
- Date: September 21 – 24
- Season: 2011–12
- Location: Oberstdorf
- Venue: Eislaufzentrum Oberstdorf

Champions
- Men's singles: (Japan) Yuzuru Hanyu
- Ladies' singles: (United States) Mirai Nagasu
- Pairs: (Russia) Tatiana Volosozhar / Maxim Trankov
- Ice dance: (United States) Madison Hubbell / Zachary Donohue
- Previous: 2010 Nebelhorn Trophy
- Next: 2012 Nebelhorn Trophy

The 2011 Nebelhorn Trophy took place on September 21–24, 2011 at the Eislaufzentrum Oberstdorf. It is held annually in Oberstdorf, Germany and is named after the Nebelhorn, a nearby mountain.

It was one of the first international senior competitions of the season. Skaters were entered by their respective national federations and competed in four disciplines: men's singles, ladies' singles, pair skating, and ice dance. The Fritz-Geiger-Memorial Trophy was presented to the team with the highest placements across all disciplines.

== Overview ==
In men's singles, Yuzuru Hanyu of Japan, Stephen Carriere from the United States, and Russian Zhan Bush were the leaders after the short program. Bush was the only skater to land a clean quad jump in this segment of the competition; it was also the first one he had landed in competition. Hanyu finished 1st in the free skate to win the event, while Michal Březina and Carriere won silver and bronze, respectively.

American Mirai Nagasu won the ladies' short program, followed by Georgia's Elene Gedevanishvili, and Germany's Sarah Hecken. Nagasu went on to win the gold, Gedevanishvili the silver, and Sweden's Joshi Helgesson moved up to take the bronze.

Russians Tatiana Volosozhar / Maxim Trankov, Americans Caydee Denney / John Coughlin, and Germans Maylin Hausch / Daniel Wende were the top three pairs in the short program. Denney and Coughlin were making their international debut together. Volosozhar and Trankov won the free skate and the event, while Vera Bazarova / Yuri Larionov finished second. Denney and Coughlin were fourth in the long program and finished third overall.

In the ice dance event, Germany's Nelli Zhiganshina / Alexander Gazsi won the short dance, followed by Americans Madison Hubbell / Zachary Donohue and Canadians Kharis Ralph / Asher Hill. Hubbell and Donohue, skating in their first international competition together, went on to win the free dance and the competition.

== Schedule ==
Date	Time	Event
Thursday, 9/22	14:00	Ice dance: Short dance
Thursday, 9/22	14:00	Men: Short program
Thursday, 9/22	14:00	Pairs: Short program
Friday, 9/23	10:00	Ladies: Short program
Friday, 9/23	10:00	Men: Free skating
Friday, 9/23	19:00	Pairs: Free skating
Saturday, 9/24	10:00	Ladies: Free skating
Saturday, 9/24	13:50	Ice dancing: Free dance

== Entries ==
Country	Men	Ladies	Pairs	Ice dance
Australia	Mitchell Chapman			
Austria		Kerstin Frank		Kira Geil / Tobias Eisenbauer
Belgium	Jorik Hendrickx	Isabelle Pieman		
Brazil	Kevin Alves			
Canada	Elladj Balde; Samuel Morais	Adriana DeSanctis	Jessica Dubé / Sebastien Wolfe; Paige Lawrence / Rudi Swiegers	Tarrah Harvey / Keith Gagnon; Kharis Ralph / Asher Hill
Czech Republic	Michal Březina	Martina Bocek		Gabriela Kubova / Dmitri Kiselev
Finland	Ari-Pekka Nurmenkari; Valtter Virtanen			Olesia Karmi / Max Lindholm; Henna Lindholm / Ossi Kanervo
France	Romain Ponsart	Yrétha Silété		
Georgia		Elene Gedevanishvili		
Germany	Franz Streubel	Nathalie Weinzierl; Sarah Hecken	Maylin Hausch / Daniel Wende; Mari Vartmann / Aaron van Cleave	Nelli Zhiganshina / Alexander Gazsi
Hong Kong		Tiffany Packard Yu		
Ireland		Clara Peters		
Israel	Alexei Bychenko		Danielle Montalbano / Evgeni Krasnapolski	
Italy		Francesca Rio		
Japan	Yuzuru Hanyu; Tatsuki Machida	Karen Kemanai; Shion Kokubun		Cathy Reed / Chris Reed
Kazakhstan	Denis Ten			
Lithuania				Isabella Tobias / Deividas Stagniūnas
Netherlands	Boyito Mulder	Manouk Gijsman		
Puerto Rico		Victoria Muniz		
Russia	Konstantin Menshov; Zhan Bush	Ksenia Makarova	Vera Bazarova / Yuri Larionov; Tatiana Volosozhar / Maxim Trankov	
Serbia		Marina Seeh		
Slovenia		Patricia Gleščič		
South Korea	Kim Min-seok			
Spain	Javier Fernández; Javier Raya	Sonia Lafuente		Sara Hurtado / Adrià Díaz
Sweden		Joshi Helgesson; Viktoria Helgesson		
Turkey				Alisa Agafonova / Alper Uçar
Ukraine		Irina Movchan		
United Kingdom	Jason Thompson			Louise Walden / Owen Edwards
United States	Max Aaron; Stephen Carriere	Joelle Forte; Mirai Nagasu	Caydee Denney / John Coughlin; Mary Beth Marley / Rockne Brubaker	Madison Hubbell / Zachary Donohue; Anastasia Olson / Jordan Cowan

== Results ==
=== Men ===
Rank	Name	Nation	Total points	SP		FS	
1	Yuzuru Hanyu	Japan	226.26	1	75.26	1	151.00
2	Michal Březina	Czech Republic	215.00	4	69.77	2	145.23
3	Stephen Carriere	United States	207.54	2	74.51	5	133.03
4	Javier Fernández	Spain	204.46	6	66.87	4	137.59
5	Max Aaron	United States	204.17	8	65.64	3	138.53
6	Zhan Bush	Russia	200.58	3	72.01	6	128.57
7	Konstantin Menshov	Russia	194.43	7	66.49	8	127.94
8	Jorik Hendrickx	Belgium	193.25	9	64.93	7	128.32
9	Denis Ten	Kazakhstan	187.25	5	68.66	9	118.59
10	Elladj Baldé	Canada	165.11	10	60.00	10	105.11
11	Samuel Morais	Canada	154.39	11	56.05	14	98.34
12	Franz Streubel	Germany	153.75	12	56.05	15	97.70
13	Javier Raya	Spain	150.53	14	47.70	11	102.83
14	Romain Ponsart	France	147.81	13	54.26	16	93.55
15	Ari-Pekka Nurmenkari	Finland	145.58	15	46.01	12	99.57
16	Kim Min-seok	South Korea	143.03	16	44.14	13	98.89
17	Valtter Virtanen	Finland	125.53	18	39.88	17	85.65
18	Mitchell Chapman	Australia	110.98	17	41.53	19	69.45
19	Boyito Mulder	Netherlands	105.73	19	35.85	18	69.88
WD	Kevin Alves	Brazil					
WD	Tatsuki Machida	Japan					

=== Ladies ===
Rank	Name	Nation	Total points	SP		FS	
1	Mirai Nagasu	United States	167.46	1	58.38	1	109.08
2	Elene Gedevanishvili	Georgia	146.92	2	50.56	2	96.36
3	Joshi Helgesson	Sweden	138.73	5	47.91	3	90.82
4	Shion Kokubun	Japan	134.66	4	49.07	5	85.59
5	Viktoria Helgesson	Sweden	133.52	9	43.36	4	90.16
6	Sarah Hecken	Germany	128.04	3	49.07	8	78.97
7	Joelle Forte	United States	122.74	7	45.80	9	76.94
8	Francesca Rio	Italy	120.49	12	39.72	6	80.77
9	Sonia Lafuente	Spain	120.10	11	39.81	7	76.94
10	Nathalie Weinzierl	Germany	116.88	10	40.58	10	76.30
11	Yrétha Silété	France	111.83	8	45.41	17	66.42
12	Park Youn-joon	South Korea	109.11	14	38.16	12	70.95
13	Kerstin Frank	Austria	107.11	13	39.66	15	67.45
14	Adriana DeSanctis	Canada	105.34	19	33.07	11	72.27
15	Karen Kemanai	Japan	104.51	18	34.19	13	70.32
16	Irina Movchan	Ukraine	104.41	15	37.19	16	67.22
17	Victoria Muniz	Puerto Rico	103.36	17	35.57	14	67.79
18	Isabelle Pieman	Belgium	97.20	16	36.64	19	60.56
19	Clara Peters	Ireland	91.27	21	29.96	18	61.31
20	Manouk Gijsman	Netherlands	84.32	20	30.49	21	53.83
21	Marina Seeh	Serbia	83.57	22	28.81	20	54.76
WD	Ksenia Makarova	Russia		6	45.95		
WD	Tiffany Packard Yu	Hong Kong					

=== Pairs ===
Rank	Name	Nation	Total points	SP		FS	
1	Tatiana Volosozhar / Maxim Trankov	United States	183.65	1	57.91	1	125.74
2	Vera Bazarova / Yuri Larionov	Russia	165.23	4	52.50	2	112.73
3	Caydee Denney / John Coughlin	United States	162.73	2	57.56	4	105.17
4	Maylin Hausch / Daniel Wende	Germany	159.30	3	53.40	3	105.90
5	Paige Lawrence / Rudi Swiegers	Canada	141.24	5	48.97	5	92.27
6	Jessica Dubé / Sébastien Wolfe	Canada	135.64	6	47.17	7	88.47
7	Tiffany Vise / Don Baldwin	United States	132.65	7	43.59	6	89.06
8	Mari Vartmann / Aaron Van Cleave	Germany	123.93	9	37.28	8	86.65
9	Danielle Montalbano / Evgeni Krasnapolski	Israel	106.27	8	37.30	9	68.97

=== Ice dance ===
Rank	Name	Nation	Total points	SD		FD	
1	Madison Hubbell / Zachary Donohue	United States	139.01	2	54.82	1	84.19
2	Nelli Zhiganshina / Alexander Gazsi	Germany	137.66	1	55.03	2	82.63
3	Kharis Ralph / Asher Hill	Canada	133.94	3	52.03	3	81.91
4	Cathy Reed / Chris Reed	Japan	125.54	5	47.90	4	77.64
5	Isabella Tobias / Deividas Stagniūnas	Lithuania	125.24	4	49.06	5	76.18
6	Anastasia Olson / Jordan Cowan	United States	119.42	6	45.84	6	73.58
7	Sara Hurtado / Adrián Díaz	Spain	117.61	7	44.89	7	72.72
8	Tarrah Harvey / Keith Gagnon	Canada	114.70	8	43.84	8	70.86
9	Kira Geil / Tobias Eisenbauer	Austria	111.10	10	42.30	9	68.80
10	Louise Walden / Owen Edwards	United Kingdom	106.45	9	43.83	12	62.62
11	Alisa Agafonova / Alper Uçar	Turkey	104.28	11	41.11	10	63.17
12	Gabriela Kubová / Dmitri Kiselev	Czech Republic	102.09	12	40.95	13	61.14
13	Olesia Karmi / Max Lindholm	Finland	98.41	14	35.61	11	62.80
14	Henna Lindholm / Ossi Kanervo	Finland	96.46	13	36.25	14	60.21
