= 2009 Canadian Figure Skating Championships =

Figure skating competition

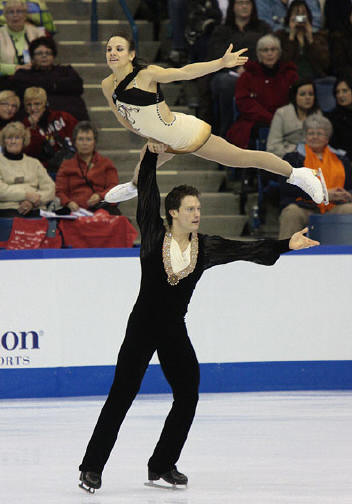
- Meagan Duhamel & Craig Buntin Lift 2009 Canadian Championships
- Type: National Championship
- Date: January 14 – 18
- Season: 2008–09
- Location: Saskatoon, Saskatchewan
- Venue: Credit Union Centre

Champions
- Men's singles: Patrick Chan
- Ladies' singles: Joannie Rochette
- Pairs: Jessica Dubé / Bryce Davison
- Ice dance: Tessa Virtue / Scott Moir
- Previous: 2008 Canadian Championships
- Next: 2010 Canadian Championships

The 2009 Canadian Figure Skating Championships took place between January 14 and 18, 2009 at the Credit Union Centre in Saskatoon, Saskatchewan. The event determines the national champions of Canada and was organized by Skate Canada, the nation's figure skating governing body. Skaters competed at the senior and junior levels in the disciplines of men's singles, women's singles, pair skating, and ice dancing. Although the official International Skating Union terminology for female skaters in the singles category is ladies, Skate Canada uses women officially. The results of this competition were used to pick the Canadian teams to the 2009 World Championships, the 2009 Four Continents Championships, and the 2009 World Junior Championships, as well as the Canadian national team.

The junior compulsory dance was the Starlight Waltz and the senior compulsory dance was the Viennese Waltz.

== Senior results ==
=== Men ===
Rank	Name	Section	Total points	SP		FS	
1	Patrick Chan	CO	254.82	1	88.89	1	165.93
2	Vaughn Chipeur	AB/NT/NU	206.30	2	71.89	3	134.41
3	Jeremy Ten	BC/YT	204.03	4	69.06	2	134.97
4	Kevin Reynolds	BC/YT	201.97	3	70.00	5	131.97
5	Shawn Sawyer	QC	201.24	6	66.88	4	134.36
6	Joey Russell	NL	195.84	5	68.27	6	127.57
7	Ian Martinez	QC	186.59	8	62.51	7	124.08
8	Ken Rose	CO	178.46	9	60.82	9	117.64
9	Fedor Andreev	EO	176.16	12	56.68	8	119.48
10	Elladj Baldé	QC	168.34	7	65.02	12	103.32
11	Paul Poirier	CO	168.32	11	58.12	10	110.20
12	Gary Wong	BC/YT	162.51	13	55.15	11	107.36
13	Jean-Simon Légaré	QC	161.63	10	60.40	14	101.23
14	Maxime-Billy Fortin	QC	157.87	14	54.69	13	103.18
15	Louis-Philippe Sirois	QC	147.76	15	54.07	15	93.69
16	Matthew Penasse	WO	128.84	16	48.13	16	80.71
17	Brennan Martin	EO	109.08	17	38.32	17	70.76

=== Women ===
Rank	Name	Section	Total points	SP		FS	
1	Joannie Rochette	QC	185.35	2	53.58	1	131.77
2	Cynthia Phaneuf	QC	151.42	1	55.16	2	96.26
3	Amélie Lacoste	QC	143.01	3	53.55	3	89.46
4	Diane Szmiett	WO	135.84	4	51.99	5	83.85
5	Kathryn Kang	BC/YT	132.48	7	46.10	4	86.38
6	Mira Leung	BC/YT	130.43	6	48.76	8	81.67
7	Vanessa Sauriol	QC	128.80	8	45.43	6	83.37
8	Vanessa Grenier	QC	122.00	9	44.67	9	77.33
9	Dana Zhalko-Tytarenko	EO	120.27	10	44.57	11	75.70
10	Adriana DeSanctis	CO	120.06	5	49.88	13	70.18
11	Myriane Samson	QC	117.27	17	34.79	7	82.48
12	Izabel Valiquette	QC	117.07	12	41.39	12	75.68
13	Kristen Walker	AB/NT/NU	113.38	16	37.40	10	75.98
14	Erin Scherrer	WO	112.54	11	42.86	14	69.68
15	Vanessa Juteau	QC	109.87	13	40.78	15	69.09
16	McKenzie Crawford	WO	106.35	15	39.59	16	66.76
17	Rachel Gendron	QC	102.95	14	40.30	17	62.65
18	Cecylia Witkowski	BC/YT	90.78	18	29.48	18	61.30

=== Pairs ===
Reigning champions Anabelle Langlois / Cody Hay withdrew before the event due to injury to Langlois.

Rank	Name	Section	Total points	SP		FS	
1	Jessica Dubé / Bryce Davison	QC	188.43	2	62.22	1	126.21
2	Meagan Duhamel / Craig Buntin	QC	182.50	1	65.74	2	116.76
3	Mylène Brodeur / John Mattatall	NS	159.85	3	55.63	3	104.22
4	Paige Lawrence / Rudi Swiegers	SK	138.92	5	49.52	4	89.40
5	Monica Pisotta / Michael Stewart	CO	136.37	6	48.98	6	87.39
6	Brooke Paulin / Brian Shales	WO	135.04	8	46.67	5	88.37
7	Rachel Kirkland / Eric Radford	CO	127.77	4	49.77	8	78.00
8	Taylor Steele / Christopher Richardson	WO	120.14	10	38.80	7	81.34
9	Christi Anne Steele / Adam Johnson	WO	119.90	9	43.06	9	76.84
10	Amanda Velenosi / Mark Fernandez	QC	117.49	7	47.08	10	70.41

=== Ice dancing ===
Rank	Name	Section	Total points	CD		OD		FD	
1	Tessa Virtue / Scott Moir	WO	197.77	1	39.33	1	63.76	1	94.68
2	Vanessa Crone / Paul Poirier	CO	175.58	2	35.62	2	55.56	4	84.40
3	Kaitlyn Weaver / Andrew Poje	NO	170.23	5	31.89	3	52.92	2	85.42
4	Andrea Chong / Guillaume Gfeller	QC	167.50	4	31.92	5	50.93	3	84.65
5	Kharis Ralph / Asher Hill	CO	160.99	9	27.39	4	51.82	5	81.78
6	Allie Hann-McCurdy / Michael Coreno	BC/YT	160.36	6	30.95	6	50.00	6	79.41
7	Siobhan Karam / Kevin O'Keefe	EO	155.60	3	31.97	7	49.83	9	73.80
8	Mylène Lamoureux / Michael Mee	QC	155.01	7	30.24	9	47.12	7	77.65
9	Mylène Girard / Jonathan Pelletier	QC	152.59	8	29.94	8	47.16	8	75.49
10	Patricia Stuckey / Christopher Mior	WO	137.55	10	25.54	11	43.36	10	68.65
11	Sarah Flesher / Jamie Forsythe	QC	135.73	12	23.75	10	43.38	11	68.60
12	Megan Wilson / Marcus Connolly	QC	127.44	11	23.83	12	41.28	12	62.33
13	Helen Ramful / Garett Goodman	AB/NT/NU	117.67	15	21.66	14	36.05	13	59.96
14	Claire Tannett / Wendell McGrath	AB/NT/NU	107.48	14	22.14	15	30.73	14	54.61
WD	Rebecca Fowler / Iliya Koreshev	BC/YT		13	23.03	13	38.40		

== Junior results ==
=== Men ===
Rank	Name	Section	Total points	SP		FS	
1	Andrei Rogozine	CO	149.77	2	52.53	1	97.24
2	Paul Parkinson	EO	141.46	10	45.09	2	96.37
3	Sébastien Wolfe	QC	140.60	3	51.02	4	89.58
4	Ronald Lam	BC/YT	140.39	1	58.22	10	82.17
5	Rob Schultz	WO	135.61	4	50.03	6	85.58
6	Samuel Morais	QC	135.45	13	44.04	3	91.41
7	Michael Marinaro	WO	131.41	9	45.36	5	86.05
8	Dave Ferland	QC	131.26	6	48.84	9	82.42
9	Patrick Wong	BC/YT	129.65	12	44.56	7	85.09
10	Liam Firus	BC/YT	129.50	5	49.54	14	79.96
11	Asher Hill	CO	126.45	11	44.57	11	81.88
12	Pierre-Luc Gagnon	QC	126.23	8	46.20	13	80.03
13	Raymond Schultz	CO	126.15	14	43.14	8	83.01
14	Andrew Lum	BC/YT	123.49	7	46.38	15	77.11
15	Ian Beharry	WO	116.02	15	42.81	16	73.21
16	Evan Gammon	WO	115.24	20	34.93	12	80.31
17	Mathieu Chassé	QC	108.90	16	39.76	17	69.14
18	Benjamin Tidy	QC	106.31	18	38.92	18	67.39
19	David Leenen	EO	104.04	19	37.79	19	66.25
20	Nicolas Fouquet	QC	103.01	17	39.42	20	63.59

=== Women ===
Rank	Name	Section	Total points	SP		FS	
1	Kate Charbonneau	MB	120.41	5	41.11	1	79.30
2	Cambria Little	BC/YT	119.18	9	40.39	2	78.79
3	Rylie McCulloch-Casarsa	WO	114.82	8	40.61	3	74.21
4	Daniela-Bella Favot	WO	114.52	2	44.63	6	69.89
5	Rika Inoda	BC/YT	112.28	7	40.68	4	71.60
6	Alana Tidy	QC	111.05	3	42.04	7	69.01
7	Ashley Simond	WO	109.12	6	41.04	9	68.08
8	Alexandra Najarro	CO	107.24	1	46.34	16	60.90
9	Jessica-Amy Sergeant	AB/NT/NU	107.22	15	35.98	5	71.24
10	Alexandrine Chong	EO	105.23	10	38.43	13	66.80
11	Kaleigh Hole	MB	105.18	13	37.48	11	67.70
12	Gabrielle Anne Cormier	NB	104.74	12	37.64	12	67.10
13	Karine Chevrier	QC	103.72	17	35.82	10	67.90
14	Maggie Mackinnon	NB	102.47	22	33.52	8	68.95
15	Jacinthe Brodeur	QC	100.78	14	36.71	15	64.07
16	Devon Kippen	AB/NT/NU	100.46	4	41.13	17	59.33
17	Megan Ure	AB/NT/NU	99.77	19	34.87	14	64.90
18	Andrée-Anne Desjardins	QC	92.40	11	37.75	20	54.65
19	Meghan Dwyer	WO	92.37	21	33.71	18	58.66
20	Christina Pulla	EO	91.16	18	35.09	19	56.07
21	Sarah Jourdain	QC	89.56	16	35.97	21	53.59
22	Alisha Tupchong	CO	85.59	20	34.20	22	51.39

=== Pairs ===
Rank	Name	Section	Total points	SP		FS	
1	Brittany Jones / Kurtis Gaskell	WO	137.24	1	48.96	1	88.28
2	Sara Jones / Jeremy Sandor	QC	123.67	2	45.35	3	78.32
3	Maddison Bird / Raymond Schultz	CO	122.12	4	43.56	2	78.56
4	Kirsten Moore-Towers / Andrew Evans	WO	118.69	6	41.02	4	77.67
5	Zoey Brown / Ian Beharry	WO	117.85	3	45.17	5	72.68
6	Michelle Egli / Donald Jackson	QC	113.71	5	42.58	6	71.13
7	Isabelle Lelievre / Sylvain Bouillere	QC	106.40	8	39.30	8	67.10
8	Maria Izzo / Jason Smith	QC	104.93	9	36.31	7	68.62
9	Kateryne Pigeon / Nathan Last	QC	104.92	7	40.21	9	64.71

=== Ice dancing ===
Rank	Name	Section	Total points	CD		OD		FD	
1	Karen Routhier / Eric Saucke-Lacelle	QC	163.53	1	32.24	1	54.02	1	77.27
2	Tarrah Harvey / Keith Gagnon	BC/YT	156.75	2	29.92	2	50.15	2	76.68
3	Alexandra Paul / Jason Cheperdak	BC/YT	150.26	4	29.08	3	48.92	4	72.26
4	Sophie Knippel / Andrew Britten	BC/YT	145.84	7	27.34	6	46.10	3	72.40
5	Sarah Arnold / Christopher Steeves	AB/NT/NU	143.80	3	29.30	5	46.85	7	67.65
6	Veronique de Beaumont-Boisvert / Sebastien Buron	QC	142.00	11	25.01	4	48.47	6	68.52
7	Olivia Nicole Martins / Alvin Chau	CO	141.72	6	27.46	7	44.48	5	69.78
8	Abby Carswell / Jason Cusmariu	CO	137.82	5	27.92	9	42.72	8	67.18
9	Alexa-Marie Arrotta / Martin Nickel	MB	136.87	8	26.14	8	44.41	9	66.32
10	Raphaëlle Viau / Sebastien Lapointe	QC	129.83	9	25.94	10	42.58	12	61.31
11	Catherine St-Onge / Alexander Browne	QC	129.16	13	24.43	11	41.35	10	63.38
12	Maja Vermeulen / Andrew Doleman	WO	127.41	10	25.23	13	40.70	11	61.48
13	Katelyn Good / Brandon Deslauriers	QC	125.91	12	24.48	12	41.04	14	60.39
14	Olga Lioudvinevitch / Thomas Williams	AB/NT/NU	122.98	16	23.06	14	40.43	15	59.49
15	Marie-Philippe Vincent / François-Xavier Ouellette	QC	122.93	15	23.18	15	38.79	13	60.96
16	Laurence Fournier Beaudry / Anthony Quintal	QC	116.63	17	23.03	17	35.94	16	57.66
17	Emily Stoll / Allan Stoll	WO	113.33	14	23.75	18	35.35	17	54.23
18	Natasha Osmond / Justin Mohr	AB/NT/NU	111.04	18	21.97	19	35.01	18	54.06
19	Marina Staltari / Jonathan Okrainetz	SK	108.10	20	21.54	20	33.63	19	52.93
20	Mélodie-Tara Tremblay / Jonathan Arcieri	QC	106.04	19	21.74	16	38.11	20	46.19

== International team selections ==
The international teams were announced as follows:

=== World Championships ===
	Men	Ladies	Pairs	Ice dancing
1	Patrick Chan	Joannie Rochette	Jessica Dubé / Bryce Davison	Tessa Virtue / Scott Moir
2	Vaughn Chipeur	Cynthia Phaneuf	Meagan Duhamel / Craig Buntin	Vanessa Crone / Paul Poirier
3	Jeremy Ten		Anabelle Langlois / Cody Hay	
1st alternate			Myléne Brodeur / John Mattatall	

=== Four Continents Championships ===
	Men	Ladies	Pairs	Ice dancing
1	Patrick Chan	Joannie Rochette	Jessica Dubé / Bryce Davison	Tessa Virtue / Scott Moir
2	Vaughn Chipeur	Cynthia Phaneuf	Meagan Duhamel / Craig Buntin	Vanessa Crone / Paul Poirier
3	Jeremy Ten	Amélie Lacoste	Anabelle Langlois / Cody Hay	Kaitlyn Weaver / Andrew Poje
1st alternate			Myléne Brodeur / John Mattatall	

=== World Junior Championships ===
	Men	Ladies	Pairs	Ice dancing
1	Elladj Baldé	Diane Szmiett	Paige Lawrence / Rudi Swiegers	Kharis Ralph / Asher Hill
2	Andrei Rogozine	Kathryn Kang	Maddison Bird / Raymond Schultz	Karen Routhier / Eric Saucke-Lacelle
3				Tarrah Harvey / Keith Gagnon
