= Maddison Bird =

Canadian pair skater

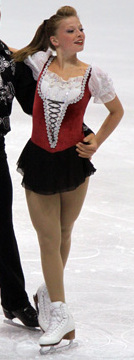

Personal information
- Full name: Maddison Bird
- Born: April 19, 1994 (age 32) Scarborough, Ontario
- Height: 1.56 m (5 ft 1 in)

Figure skating career
- Country: Canada
- Skating club: Mariposa School of Skating

Maddison Bird (born April 19, 1994) is a Canadian pair skater. With partner Raymond Schultz, she finished sixth at the 2009 World Junior Championships and won the junior bronze medal at the 2009 Canadian Championships. Their partnership ended in 2010.

== Programs ==
(with Schultz)

Season	Short program	Free skating	Exhibition
2009–2010	On the Road to Vladivostok performed by The Gypsy Fiddler	The Soul of Tango by Astor Piazzolla	Always on Your Side by Sheryl Crow and Sting
2008–2009	On the Road to Vladivostok performed by The Gypsy Fiddler	For the Love of a Princess (from Braveheart)	

== Competitive highlights ==
(with Schultz)

Results
International
Event	2007–08	2008–09	2009–10
World Junior Championships		6th	
JGP Belarus		7th	5th
JGP United States			5th
National
Canadian Championships	3rd N.	3rd J.	
JGP = Junior Grand Prix; Levels: N. = Novice; J. = Junior
