= Kate Charbonneau =

Canadian figure skater (born 1993)

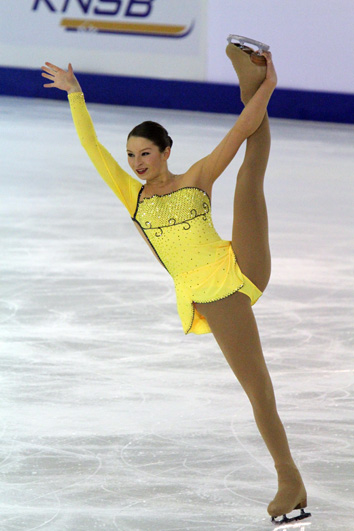
- Charbonneau at the 2010 World Junior Championships

Personal information
- Born: April 2, 1993 (age 33) Winnipeg, Manitoba
- Home town: Prior Lake, Minnesota
- Height: 1.63 m (5 ft 4 in)

Figure skating career
- Country: Canada
- Coach: Lorie Charbonneau; Robert Tebby
- Skating club: Skate Winnipeg; Figure Skating Club of Bloomington
- Began skating: 1997
- Retired: 2013

Kate Charbonneau (born April 2, 1993) is a Canadian former competitive figure skater. She is the 2009 Canadian national junior champion and placed sixth at the 2010 World Junior Championships.

== Early life ==
Charbonneau was born on April 2, 1993, in Winnipeg, Manitoba. She has lived in Prior Lake, Minnesota, with her family since she was four. Her mother, Lorie, is a figure skating coach.

== Career ==
Charbonneau began skating at age three because her dying grandmother wanted to see her skate before she died. She started skating competitively in the United States but never appeared internationally for the U.S. She placed fourth on the intermediate level at the 2006 U.S. Junior Championships but the next two seasons she did not advance from Regionals and Sectionals. In the 2008–09 season, she began representing Canada as she had wanted to skate for Canada since she was about seven years old.

Charbonneau won the junior ladies' title at the 2009 Canadian Championships and received her first ISU Junior Grand Prix assignments later that year. She placed seventh on the senior level at the 2010 Canadian Championships. In March 2010, she represented Canada at the 2010 World Junior Championships in The Hague, Netherlands; she placed fourth in the short program, seventh in the free skate, and sixth overall.

Charbonneau was coached by her mother, Lorie, and Robert Tebby in Bloomington, Minnesota. After retiring from competition, she began a coaching career. She is an instructor in learn-to-skate programs.

== Programs ==
Season	Short program	Free skating
2012–13		Bring Him Home (from Les Misérables)
2011–12	Pas de deux (from The Nutcracker) by Pyotr Ilyich Tchaikovsky choreo. by Jeffrey Buttle	West Side Story by Leonard Bernstein choreo. by Kelly Benzinger
2010–11	Malagueña by Ernesto Lecuona	Les feuilles mortes; Hymne à l'amour
2009–10	Malagueña by Ernesto Lecuona	Scheherazade by Nikolai Rimsky-Korsakov

== Competitive highlights ==
JGP: Junior Grand Prix

=== Results for Canada ===
International
Event	08–09	09–10	10–11	11–12	12–13
World Junior Champ.		6th			
JGP Austria			15th		
JGP Croatia		2nd			
JGP Germany			13th		
JGP Italy				7th	
JGP Poland		8th		5th	
National
Canadian Champ.	1st J.	7th	9th	6th	9th
J. = Junior level
