= 2009 World Junior Figure Skating Championships =

- Type: ISU Championship
- Date: February 22 – March 1
- Season: 2008–09
- Location: Sofia, Bulgaria
- Host: Bulgarian Skating Federation
- Venue: Winter Sports Hall

Champions
- Men's singles: (United States) Adam Rippon
- Ladies' singles: (Russia) Alena Leonova
- Pairs: (Russia) Lubov Iliushechkina / Nodari Maisuradze
- Ice dance: (United States) Madison Chock / Greg Zuerlein
- Previous: 2008 World Junior Championships
- Next: 2010 World Junior Championships

The 2009 World Junior Figure Skating Championships was an international competition in the 2008–09 season. Commonly called "World Juniors" and "Junior Worlds", they are an annual figure skating competition in which elite figure skaters compete for the title of World Junior Champion in the disciplines of men's singles, ladies' singles, pair skating, and ice dancing.

The event was held between February 22 and March 1, 2009, at the Winter Sports Hall in Sofia, Bulgaria. The event had been provisionally scheduled to be held in Ostrava, Czech Republic, however, due to financial reasons, the Czech Figure Skating Association could not host. Therefore, on October 13, 2008, the International Skating Union definitively assigned the World Junior Championships to Sofia.

== Qualification ==
The competition was open to skaters from ISU member nations who had reached the age of 13 by July 1, 2008, but had not yet turned 19. The upper age limit for men competing in pairs and dance was 21.

The term "Junior" refers to the age level rather than necessarily the skill level. Therefore, some of the skaters competing have competed nationally and internationally at the senior level, but are still age-eligible for World Juniors. Regardless of whether they have competed as seniors, all competitors perform programs that conform to the ISU rules for junior level competition in terms of program lengths, jumping passes, etc.

=== Number of entries per discipline ===
All members nations have one entry in each discipline by default. Member nations may earn more than entry based on their performance at the previous year's championships.

The following countries earned more than one entry to the 2009 World Junior Championships based on their performance at the 2008 World Junior Championships.

Spots	Men	Ladies	Pairs	Dance
3	Russia; United States	United States	China; Russia	Canada; Russia; United States
2	Canada; China; Czech Republic; France	Canada; Finland; Germany; Japan; Russia; Sweden	Canada; Estonia; United States	France; Italy; Ukraine

== Schedule ==
All times are GMT+2.

- Tuesday, February 24
  - 13:30 Ice dancing – Compulsory Dance
  - 18:30 Opening Ceremony
  - 19:00 Pairs – Short Program
- Wednesday, February 25
  - 10:00 Men – Short Program (1st Half)
  - 14:00 Men – Short Program (2nd Half)
  - 19:00 Pairs – Free Skating
- Thursday, February 26
  - 13:00 Ice dancing – Original Dance
  - 18:30 Men – Free Skating
- Friday, February 27
  - 09:00 Ladies – Short Program (1st Half)
  - 14:00 Ladies – Short Program (2nd Half)
  - 18:30 Ice dancing – Free Dance
- Saturday, February 28
  - 13:30 Ladies – Free Skating
- Sunday, March 1
  - 14:00 Exhibition

== Medals table ==
Rank	Nation	Gold	Silver	Bronze	Total
1	United States (USA)	2	2	2	6
2	Russia (RUS)	2	1	2	5
3	Czech Republic (CZE)	0	1	0	1
Totals (3 entries)		4	4	4	12

== Results ==
=== Men ===
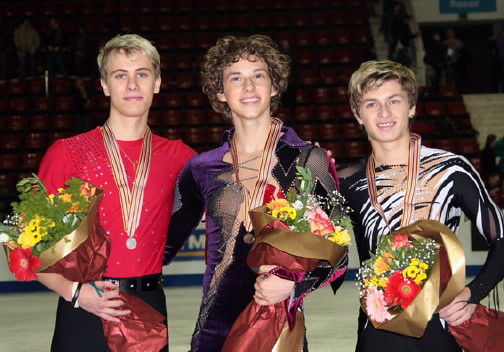
The men's podium at the 2009 World Junior Championships. From left: Michal Březina (2nd), Adam Rippon (1st), Artem Grigoriev (3rd).

Rank	Name	Nation	Total points	SP		FS	
1	Adam Rippon	United States	222.00	1	74.30	1	147.70
2	Michal Březina	Czech Republic	204.88	2	69.55	2	135.33
3	Artem Grigoriev	Russia	184.40	4	65.11	3	119.29
4	Denis Ten	Kazakhstan	183.77	5	64.80	4	118.97
5	Curran Oi	United States	182.89	3	69.40	7	113.49
6	Yang Chao	China	177.86	7	62.25	6	115.61
7	Song Nan	China	175.44	10	58.70	5	116.74
8	Elladj Balde	Canada	170.76	8	60.63	8	110.13
9	Kevin Reynolds	Canada	169.36	6	63.81	10	105.55
10	Ross Miner	United States	164.80	9	59.15	9	105.65
11	Nikolai Bondar	Ukraine	161.93	13	57.75	11	104.18
12	Yuzuru Hanyu	Japan	161.77	11	58.18	13	103.59
13	Alexander Majorov	Sweden	154.06	12	58.15	16	95.91
14	Denis Wieczorek	Germany	153.73	15	54.20	15	99.53
15	Florent Amodio	France	153.70	19	49.80	12	103.90
16	Stanislav Kovalev	Russia	151.93	18	50.26	14	101.67
17	Peter Reitmayer	Slovakia	150.85	14	55.65	17	95.20
18	Mark Vaillant	France	145.90	16	52.59	20	93.31
19	Javier Raya	Spain	144.19	17	50.50	19	93.69
20	Petr Coufal	Czech Republic	143.45	21	48.40	18	95.05
21	Ruben Errampalli	Italy	133.03	24	45.93	21	87.10
22	Kim Min-seok	South Korea	129.87	23	46.73	22	83.14
23	Viktor Romanenkov	Estonia	124.09	20	49.11	23	74.98
24	Matthew Precious	Australia	121.93	22	47.04	24	74.89
25	Pavel Petrov Savinov	Bulgaria	88.59	37	30.84	25	57.75
Did not advance to free skating
26	Sebastian Iwasaki	Poland		25	45.20		
27	Stephen Li-Chung Kuo	Chinese Taipei		26	43.14		
28	Ruben Blommaert	Belgium		27	43.12		
29	Matthew Parr	United Kingdom		28	42.84		
30	Bela Papp	Finland		29	42.59		
31	Engin Ali Artan	Turkey		30	40.16		
32	Sarkis Hairapetyan	Armenia		31	39.18		
33	Saulius Ambrulevičius	Lithuania		32	38.01		
34	Dmitri Kagirov	Belarus		33	37.98		
35	Mario-Rafael Ionian	Austria		34	37.74		
36	Tomi Pulkkinen	Switzerland		35	33.37		
37	Zsolt Kosz	Romania		36	33.24		
38	Beka Shankulashvili	Georgia		38	30.74		
39	Boyito Mulder	Netherlands		39	29.71		
40	Ivor Mikolcevic	Croatia		40	26.55		
41	Cameron Hems	New Zealand		41	25.91		

=== Ladies ===
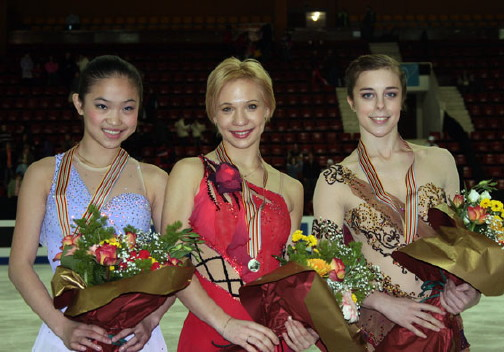
The ladies' podium at the 2009 World Junior Championships. From left: Caroline Zhang (2nd), Alena Leonova (1st), Ashley Wagner (3rd).

Rank	Name	Nation	Total points	SP		FS	
1	Alena Leonova	Russia	157.18	3	55.50	2	101.68
2	Caroline Zhang	United States	154.67	10	47.64	1	107.03
3	Ashley Wagner	United States	153.57	2	57.50	3	96.07
4	Joshi Helgesson	Sweden	139.89	4	55.14	6	84.75
5	Katrina Hacker	United States	139.68	5	51.06	4	88.62
6	Elene Gedevanishvili	Georgia	138.32	1	60.32	11	78.00
7	Sarah Hecken	Germany	135.83	9	48.14	5	87.69
8	Ivana Reitmayerová	Slovakia	129.40	6	48.34	8	81.06
9	Oksana Gozeva	Russia	126.70	15	44.54	7	82.16
10	Isabel Drescher	Germany	126.65	8	48.16	10	78.49
11	Francesca Rio	Italy	122.70	7	48.24	12	74.46
12	Maé Bérénice Méité	France	122.53	16	43.98	9	78.55
13	Diane Szmiett	Canada	119.09	12	47.48	15	71.61
14	Miriam Ziegler	Austria	116.20	19	42.92	13	73.28
15	Svetlana Issakova	Estonia	115.14	18	43.38	14	71.76
16	Haruka Imai	Japan	113.24	17	43.58	16	69.66
17	Chaochih Liu	Chinese Taipei	112.49	13	46.82	18	65.67
18	Geng Bingwa	China	111.71	11	47.54	21	64.17
19	Eleonora Vinnichenko	Ukraine	110.66	20	42.42	17	68.24
20	Sonia Lafuente	Spain	109.27	14	46.16	22	63.11
21	Kathryn Kang	Canada	104.82	23	40.38	20	64.44
22	Kwak Min-jeong	South Korea	103.69	24	38.94	19	64.75
23	Karly Robertson	United Kingdom	102.53	22	40.58	23	61.95
24	Katsiarina Pakhamovich	Belarus	88.50	21	41.18	25	47.32
25	Stefanie Pechlaner	Bulgaria	76.45	44	28.82	24	47.63
Did not advance to free skating
26	Mari Suzuki	Japan		25	38.50		
27	Romy Bühler	Switzerland		26	37.60		
28	Manouk Gijsman	Netherlands		27	37.44		
29	Karina Johnson	Denmark		28	37.26		
30	Mimi Tanasorn Chindasook	Thailand		29	37.02		
31	Alexandra Rout	New Zealand		30	36.56		
32	Angelica Olsson	Sweden		31	36.50		
33	Anne Line Gjersem	Norway		32	34.30		
34	Alexandria Riordan	Poland		33	34.04		
35	Beatrice Rozinskaite	Lithuania		34	33.38		
36	Chelsea Rose Chiappa	Hungary		35	33.26		
37	Georgia Glastris	Greece		36	32.74		
38	Matleena Laakso	Finland		37	32.36		
39	Jaimee Nobbs	Australia		38	32.02		
40	Zanna Pugaca	Latvia		39	31.28		
41	Kristina Kostková	Czech Republic		40	31.06		
42	Reyna Hamui	Mexico		41	30.98		
43	Mary Grace Baldo	Philippines		42	30.66		
44	Sofia Bardakov	Israel		43	29.52		
45	Noora Pitkänen	Finland		45	28.22		
46	Daša Grm	Slovenia		46	28.14		
47	Maria Dikanovic	Croatia		47	27.08		
48	Lydia Fuentes	Andorra		48	27.04		
49	Laurie Lougsami	Belgium		49	26.72		
50	Armine Stambultsyan	Armenia		50	26.50		
51	Birce Atabey	Turkey		51	24.14		
52	Mila Petrovic	Serbia		52	23.54		
53	Naida Akšamija	Bosnia and Herzegovina		53	20.08		
54	Anja Chong	Singapore		54	15.46		

=== Pairs ===
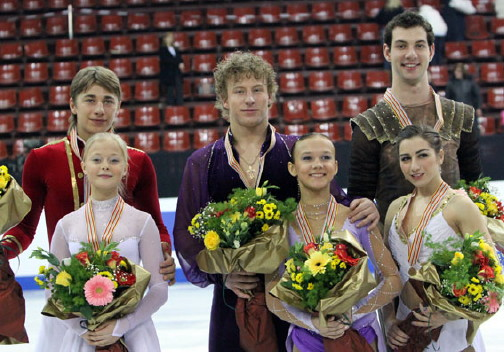
The pairs podium at the 2009 World Junior Championships. From left: Anastasia Martiusheva / Alexei Rogonov(2nd), Lubov Iliushechkina / Nodari Maisuradze (1st), Marissa Castelli / Simon Shnapir (3rd).

Rank	Name	Nation	Total points	SP		FS	
1	Lubov Iliushechkina / Nodari Maisuradze	Russia	144.32	1	55.12	2	89.20
2	Anastasia Martiusheva / Alexei Rogonov	Russia	138.59	11	44.60	1	93.99
3	Marissa Castelli / Simon Shnapir	United States	137.47	2	49.10	4	88.37
4	Paige Lawrence / Rudi Swiegers	Canada	137.07	4	48.64	3	88.43
5	Ekaterina Sheremetieva / Mikhail Kuznetsov	Russia	134.80	3	48.84	5	85.96
6	Maddison Bird / Raymond Schultz	Canada	127.63	6	46.60	6	81.03
7	Narumi Takahashi / Mervin Tran	Japan	126.64	8	45.98	7	80.66
8	Zhang Yue / Wang Lei	China	125.30	7	45.98	8	79.32
9	Brynn Carman / Chris Knierim	United States	124.93	9	45.94	9	78.99
10	Anaïs Morand / Antoine Dorsaz	Switzerland	123.60	5	47.28	10	76.32
11	Cheng Duo / Gao Yu	China	119.73	10	44.94	11	74.79
12	Maria Sergejeva / Ilja Glebov	Estonia	116.38	12	44.36	12	72.02
13	Krystyna Klimczak / Janusz Karweta	Poland	107.81	14	40.58	13	67.23
14	Camille Foucher / Bruno Massot	France	104.26	13	40.98	15	63.28
15	Carolina Gillespie / Daniel Aggiano	Italy	101.43	15	37.94	14	63.49
16	Gabriela Čermanová / Martin Hanulák	Slovakia	101.08	16	37.92	16	63.16
17	Alexandra Herbríková / Lukáš Ovčáček	Czech Republic	98.26	17	37.40	17	60.86
18	Marylie Jorg / Benjamin Koenderink	Netherlands	97.63	18	37.04	18	60.59
19	Rie Aoi / Wen Xiong Guo	Hong Kong	91.28	20	33.66	19	57.62
20	Anna Khnychenkova / Sergei Kulbach	Ukraine	87.81	19	34.24	20	53.57
Did not advance to free skating
21	Tameron Drake / Edward Alton	United Kingdom		21	30.82		

=== Ice dancing ===
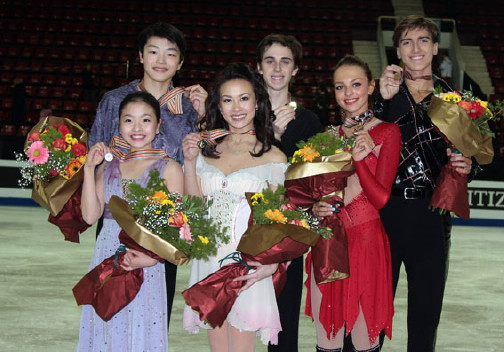
The ice dancing podium at the 2009 World Junior Championships. From left: Maia Shibutani / Alex Shibutani (2nd), Madison Chock / Greg Zuerlein (1st), Ekaterina Riazanova / Jonathan Guerreiro (3rd).

Rank	Name	Nation	Total points	CD		OD		FD	
1	Madison Chock / Greg Zuerlein	United States	172.55	1	33.15	1	57.29	1	82.11
2	Maia Shibutani / Alex Shibutani	United States	162.15	5	29.71	4	52.10	2	80.34
3	Ekaterina Riazanova / Jonathan Guerreiro	Russia	161.80	7	29.02	2	53.80	3	78.98
4	Madison Hubbell / Keiffer Hubbell	United States	161.34	2	31.39	3	53.44	4	76.51
5	Kharis Ralph / Asher Hill	Canada	152.76	4	30.09	6	49.58	5	73.09
6	Ekaterina Pushkash / Dmitri Kiselev	Russia	150.21	3	30.44	5	50.30	9	69.47
7	Karen Routhier / Eric Saucke-Lacelle	Canada	149.50	6	29.24	8	48.06	6	72.20
8	Lucie Myslivečková / Matěj Novák	Czech Republic	146.04	11	27.80	7	49.18	10	69.06
9	Lorenza Alessandrini / Simone Vaturi	Italy	145.61	10	27.81	9	47.67	8	70.13
10	Terra Findlay / Benoît Richaud	France	145.17	13	26.82	10	47.11	7	71.24
11	Marina Antipova / Artem Kudashev	Russia	138.86	8	28.57	13	45.00	12	65.29
12	Tarrah Harvey / Keith Gagnon	Canada	138.38	12	27.53	12	45.33	11	65.52
13	Alisa Agafonova / Dmitri Dun	Ukraine	134.86	9	27.92	11	45.55	14	61.39
14	Guan Xueting / Wang Meng	China	124.32	15	25.37	25	36.16	13	62.79
15	Nikki Georgiadis / Graham Hockley	Greece	121.32	18	23.21	16	39.52	15	58.59
16	Sonja Pauli / Tobias Eisenbauer	Austria	121.07	17	24.52	18	38.81	17	57.74
17	Nikola Višňová / Lukáš Csolley	Slovakia	121.03	20	22.76	15	40.16	16	58.11
18	Genevieve Deutch / Evan Roberts	United Kingdom	120.97	14	26.37	14	41.69	22	52.91
19	Charlene Guignard / Guillaume Paulmier	France	119.88	16	24.56	19	38.22	18	57.10
20	Paola Amati / Marco Fabbri	Italy	115.66	21	22.61	23	37.38	20	55.67
21	Dora Turoczi / Balazs Major	Hungary	115.16	24	22.23	24	37.17	19	55.76
22	Dominique Dieck / Michael Zenkner	Germany	114.29	22	22.48	21	37.65	21	54.16
23	Anastasia Galyeta / Alexei Shumski	Ukraine	113.04	19	23.12	17	39.17	23	50.75
24	Oksana Klimova / Sasha Palomäki	Finland	111.22	23	22.44	20	38.08	24	50.70
25	Lora Semova / Dimitar Lichev	Bulgaria	99.11	29	20.29	29	31.28	25	47.54
Did not advance to free dance
26	Lesia Valadzenkava / Vitali Vakunov	Belarus	57.95	28	20.36	22	37.59		
27	Justyna Plutowska / Dawid Pietrzyński	Poland	56.44	25	21.86	26	34.58		
28	Ramona Elsener / Florian Roost	Switzerland	54.41	30	19.91	27	34.50		
29	Kristina Kiudmaa / Aleksei Trohlev	Estonia	53.47	27	20.45	28	33.02		
30	Alissandra Aronow / Aleksandr Pirogov	Lithuania	52.72	26	21.80	30	30.92		
Did not advance to original dance
31	Ariana Weintraub / Avidan Brown	Israel		31	19.87				
32	Sara Hurtado / Adria Diaz	Spain		32	19.86				
33	Maria Popkova / Viktor Kovalenko	Uzbekistan		33	19.77				
