= Yrétha Silété =

French figure skater

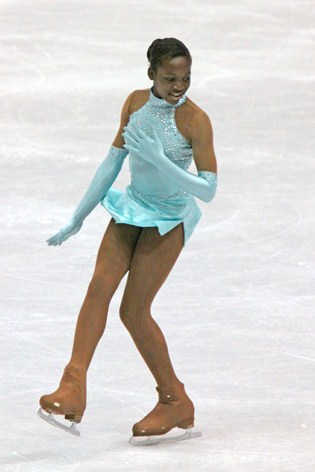
- Silété in 2009

Personal information
- Born: 27 August 1994 (age 32) Melun, France
- Home town: Dammarie-lès-Lys
- Height: 1.65 m (5 ft 5 in)

Figure skating career
- Country: France
- Coach: Claude Thévenard
- Skating club: CSG Dammarie-Les-Lys
- Began skating: 2000
- Retired: 1 November 2014

Yrétha Silété (born 27 August 1994) is a French former competitive figure skater. She is a two-time French national champion (2011, 2012) and represented France at the European, World, and World Junior Championships. She achieved her best result, ninth, at the 2012 European Championships.

== Personal life ==
Yrétha Silété was born in Melun, Seine-et-Marne. Her parents immigrated to France from Togo. Her sister, Yolene, is a gymnast and her brother, Yvan, plays soccer. She decided to study law.

== Career ==
Silété began skating at age six in Dammarie-lès-Lys and worked with coach Claude Péri-Thévenard throughout her entire career.

In 2008, Silété won the national novice title. She skated in the ISU Junior Grand Prix series in 2009 and 2010; her best result was fourth at the 2010 JGP Courchevel. Later that season, she won the bronze medal at the 2010 NRW Trophy. Silété won the French Championships at the senior level, finishing first in the short program and fourth in the free skating. She was 11th at the 2011 Junior Worlds.

Following the 2010–11 season, Silété decided to turn senior. She began the 2011–12 season at the 2011 Nebelhorn Trophy, where she placed 11th. Her next event was the 2011 French Masters; she came in fifth in the short program but won the free skate to place third overall. She competed at the 2011 Trophée Éric Bompard, where she placed 8th. Silété next competed at the French Nationals, and successfully defended her title.

Silété competed at the European Championships for the first time in her career, and aimed for a top-ten finish. She achieved her goal, finishing ninth after placing 8th in the short program and 11th in the free skate. She was chosen to represent France at the 2012 World Championships in Nice. At the event, she placed 8th in the free program and 12th overall. She was also part of the French team at the 2012 World Team Trophy.

Silété received a pair of senior Grand Prix assignments, however, in August 2012, she collided with another skater while training in Courchevel and had a bad fall, suffering a torn anterior cruciate ligament and injuring her lateral external ligament and meniscus. She underwent surgery to repair the damage on 27 August and was expected to remain off the ice until January 2013 and miss the entire 2012–13 season. Recovery was a slow process — in April 2013, Silété had regained only one triple jump, the toe loop. Although she had another operation in August 2013, persistent problems led her to retire from competition on 1 November 2014.

== Programs ==
Season	Short program	Free skating	Exhibition
2013–14	Pussycat Moan by Katie Webster	Bram Stoker's Dracula by Wojciech Kilar	
2011–12	Black Swan by Clint Mansell, Pyotr Tchaikovsky	Xotica by René Dupéré	Someone Like You by Adele
2010–11	The Great Gig in the Sky by Pink Floyd	Les aventures extraordinaires d'Adele Blanc-sec by Éric Serra	Last Dance (from Thank God It's Friday) by Paul Jabara performed by Donna Summer
2009–10	The Great Gig in the Sky by Pink Floyd	Romeo and Juliet by Pyotr Tchaikovsky	
2008–09	Love Story by Francis Lai	The Cotton Club by John Barry	

== Competitive highlights ==
GP: Grand Prix; JGP: Junior Grand Prix

International
Event	08–09	09–10	10–11	11–12	12–13
World Champ.				12th	
European Champ.				9th	
GP Cup of China					WD
GP Trophée Bompard					WD
Cup of Nice				9th	
Nebelhorn Trophy				11th	
NRW Trophy			3rd		
International: Junior
World Junior Champ.			11th		
JGP France			4th		
JGP Germany		6th	6th		
JGP United States		10th			
National
French Champ.	6th	4th	1st	1st	
Masters	3rd J	3rd J	1st J	3rd	
Team events
World Team Trophy				4th T 11th P	
N: Novice level; WD: Withdrew; T: Team result; P: Personal result. Medals awarded for team result only.
