= Kurtis Gaskell =

Canadian pair skater

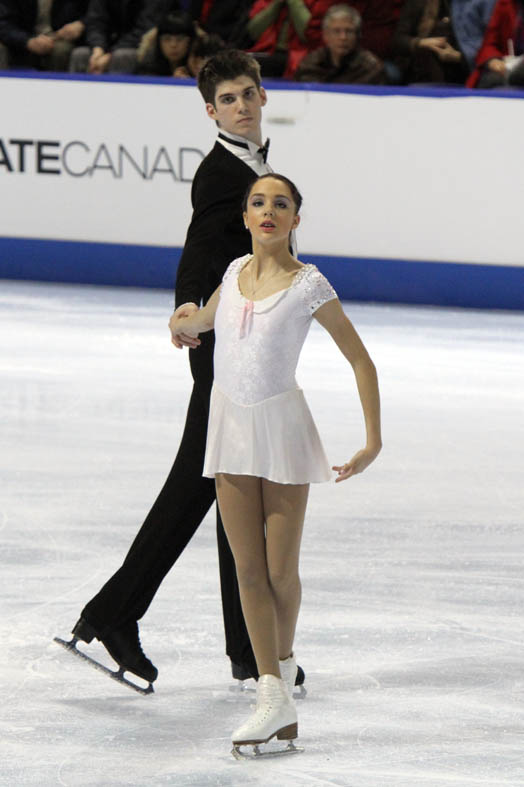
- Gaskell with Jones in 2011

Personal information
- Born: April 28, 1990 (age 36) Guelph, Ontario
- Height: 1.85 m (6 ft 1 in)

Figure skating career
- Country: Canada
- Coach: Lee Barkell
- Skating club: Kitchener Waterloo SC
- Began skating: 1992

Kurtis Gaskell (born April 28, 1990) is a Canadian pair skater. With former partner Brittany Jones, he is the 2009 Canadian Junior champion. Jones and Gaskell ended their partnership in 2012.

== Programs ==
(with Jones)

Season	Short program	Free skating
2011–2012	Music From a Farther Room by Paul Swartz; Nocturne; Bohemian Rhapsody performed by Lucia Micarelli	Tosca; Lucevan Le stelle (from Tosca) by Giacomo Puccini
2010–2011	The Day Will Dawn by Richard Addinsell	My Fair Lady by Frederick Loewe
2009–2010	The Ukraine	Toccata and Fugue by Johann Sebastian Bach; Winter; Spring by Antonio Vivaldi all performed by Vanessa-Mae

== Competitive highlights ==
(with Jones)

International
Event	2008–09	2009–10	2010–11	2011–12
GP Cup of Russia				7th
International: Junior
World Junior Champ.		7th	6th	
JGP Final			6th	
JGP Austria			6th	
JGP Germany		8th	4th	
JGP Poland		3rd		
National
Canadian Champ.	1st J.	9th	6th	7th
J. = Junior level
