= Shion Kokubun =

Japanese figure skater

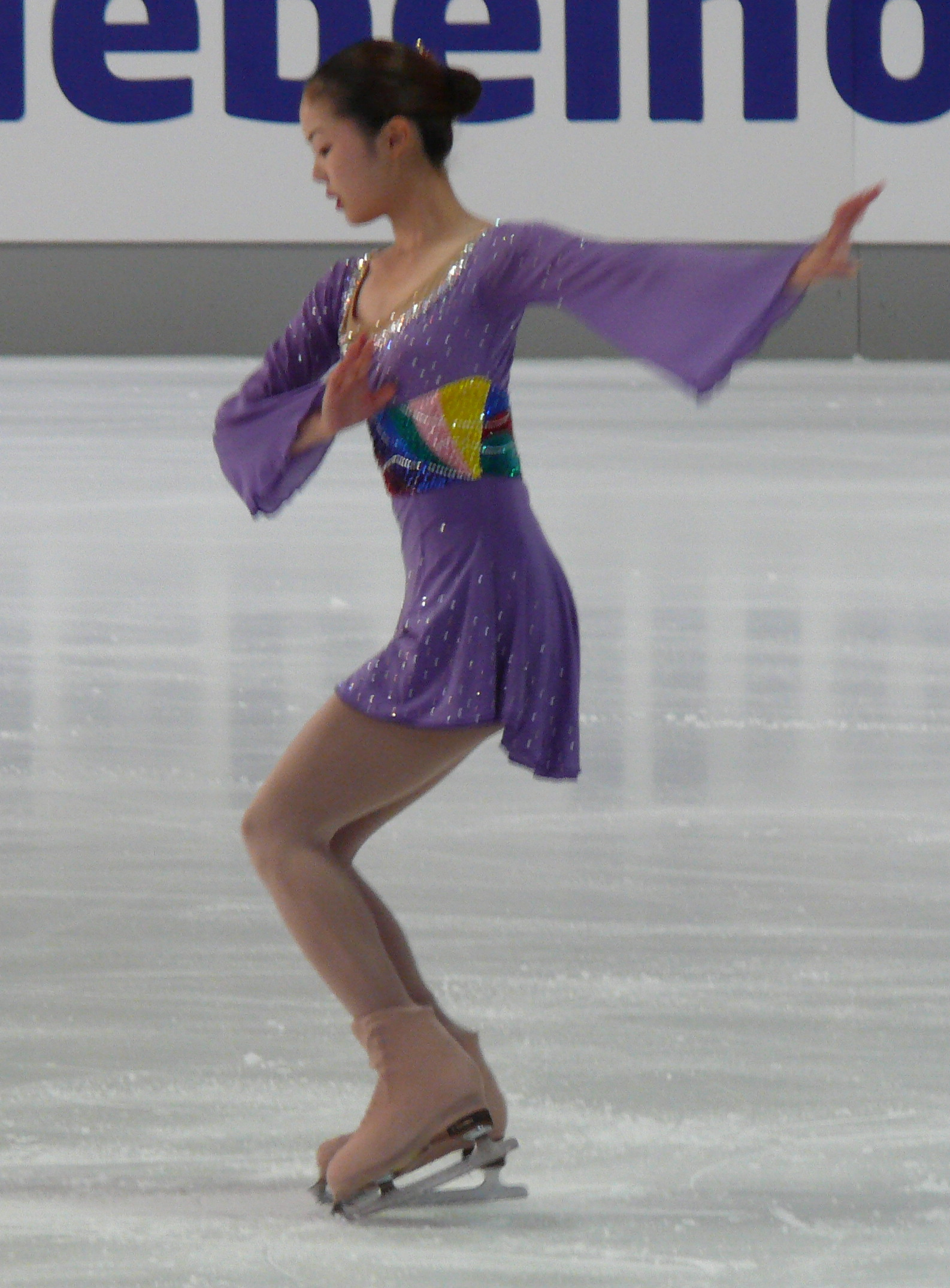
- Kokubun at the 2011 Nebelhorn Trophy

Personal information
- Born: December 24, 1991 (age 34) Sapporo, Hokkaido
- Home town: Takatuki, Osaka
- Height: 1.68 m (5 ft 6 in)

Figure skating career
- Country: Japan
- Skating club: Kansai University Ice Skate Club
- Began skating: 1995

Shion Kokubun (國分 紫苑, Kokubun Shion; ; family name also spelled 国分) (born December 24, 1991, in Hokkaido, Japan) is a former Japanese figure skater. She won the 2009 Golden Spin of Zagreb and is the 2011 Winter Universiade bronze medalist.

== Career ==
Kokubun originally trained with Mami Yamada, but she later transferred coaches to Utako Nagamitsu. Nagamitsu said that she was encouraging Kokubun to think more for herself in their training.

In 2009, Kokubun debuted as a senior and won the Golden Spin of Zagreb. She placed 14th at the Japan Championships. Later in the season, in January, she won the National High School Skating and Ice Hockey Championships.

The next season, she received two assignments on the 2010–11 ISU Junior Grand Prix series. She finished 5th at her assignment in Japan and won the bronze medal at the stage in Romania. At the Japan Championships, she finished in 19th. In February, Kokubun competed at the 2011 Winter Universiade, where she won the bronze medal.

In the 2011–2012 season, she competed at the Nebelhorn Trophy and the Merano Cup; she placed 4th at both. She was 17th at the Japan Championships.

Her free skate for the 2012–2013 season was set to music from "The Phantom of the Opera". It was originally choreographed by Robert Dow, but he was not in Japan long enough to finish the program, and Kokubun received assistance from Daisuke Takahashi, who had previously skated to the same music, to complete it. She placed 23rd at the Japan Championships.

Kokubun's last major competition was the 2013 Japan Championships, where she finished in 22nd.

== Personal life and education ==
Kokubun enrolled in Kansai University and studied in its School of Social Sciences.

== Programs ==
Season	Short program	Free skating
2010–11	Sayuri (from Memoirs of a Geisha) by John Williams	Rhapsody in Blue by George Gershwin

== Competitive highlights ==
JGP: Junior Grand Prix

International
Event	06–07	07–08	08–09	09–10	10–11	11–12	12–13	13–14
Golden Spin				1st				
Nebelhorn						4th		
Universiade					3rd			
International: Junior
JGP Japan					5th			
JGP Romania					3rd			
National
Japan Champ.				14th	19th	17th	23rd	22nd
Japan Junior	13th	15th	11th					
