= Raymond Schultz (figure skater) =

Canadian figure skater

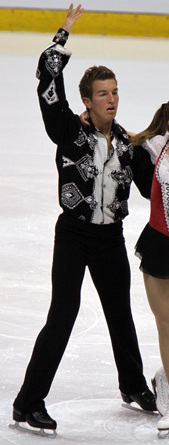

Personal information
- Born: April 25, 1990 (age 36) Toronto, Ontario
- Home town: Bradford, Ontario
- Height: 1.73 m (5 ft 8 in)

Figure skating career
- Country: Canada
- Skating club: Mariposa School of Skating
- Began skating: 1994
- Retired: 2012

Raymond Schultz (born April 25, 1990) is a Canadian pair skater. With Natasha Purich, he placed fifth at the 2011 World Junior Championships and won the 2011 Canadian junior title. With Maddison Bird, he finished sixth at the 2009 World Junior Championships.

== Programs ==
=== With Purich ===
Season	Short program	Free skating
2011–2012	Night Train by Jimmy Forrest	Spellbound Concerto by Miklós Rózsa
2010–2011	Zorba the Greek performed by Gipsy Kings	St. Louis Blues by Doc Severinsen

=== With Bird ===
Season	Short program	Free skating	Exhibition
2009–2010	On the Road to Vladivostok performed by The Gypsy Fiddler	The Soul of Tango by Astor Piazzolla	Always on Your Side by Sheryl Crow and Sting
2008–2009	On the Road to Vladivostok performed by The Gypsy Fiddler	For the Love of a Princess (from Braveheart)	

== Competitive highlights ==
=== With Purich ===
Results
International
Event	2010–11	2011–12
GP NHK Trophy		8th
International: Junior
World Junior Championships	5th	
JGP Final	7th	
JGP Czech Republic	3rd	
JGP Great Britain	3rd	
National
Canadian Championships	1st J.	8th
GP = Grand Prix; JGP = Junior Grand Prix; J. = Junior level

=== With Bird ===
Results
International
Event	2007–08	2008–09	2009–10
World Junior Championships		6th	
JGP Belarus		7th	5th
JGP United States			5th
National
Canadian Championships	3rd N.	3rd J.	
JGP = Junior Grand Prix; Levels: N. = Novice; J. = Junior
