= Asher Hill =

Canadian ice dancer (born 1991)

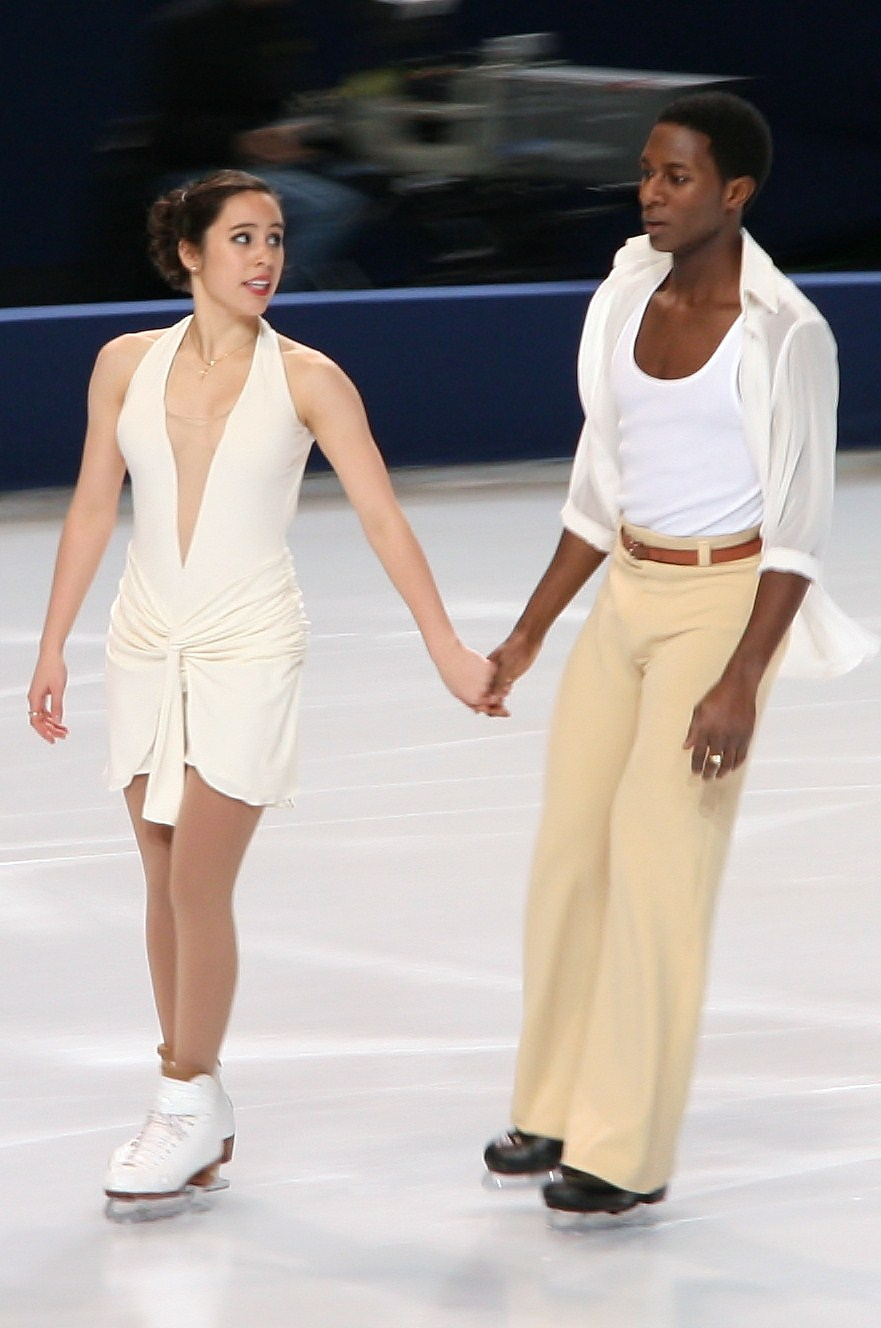
- Ralph and Hill in 2010.

Personal information
- Born: March 19, 1991 (age 35) Scarborough, Ontario
- Height: 1.75 m (5 ft 9 in)

Figure skating career
- Country: Canada
- Partner: Nicole Orford
- Coach: Carol Lane, Jon Lane, Juris Razgulajevs
- Skating club: Scarborough FSC
- Began skating: 1995
- Retired: June 16, 2016

Asher Hill (born March 19, 1991) is a Canadian retired ice dancer. With previous partner Kharis Ralph, he is the 2008 Canadian national junior champion and 2011 Nebelhorn Trophy bronze medalist. He teamed up with Nicole Orford in 2015.

He has since also collaborated with Dylan Moscovitch, in the program That Figure Skating Show, interviewing figure skaters and commenting on seasonal competitions.

== Personal life ==
Hill attended Ryerson University (now Toronto Metropolitan University), studying occupational health and safety. He has a twin sister, Acacia. Residing in Pickering, he has worked as a coach and choreographer.

== Career ==
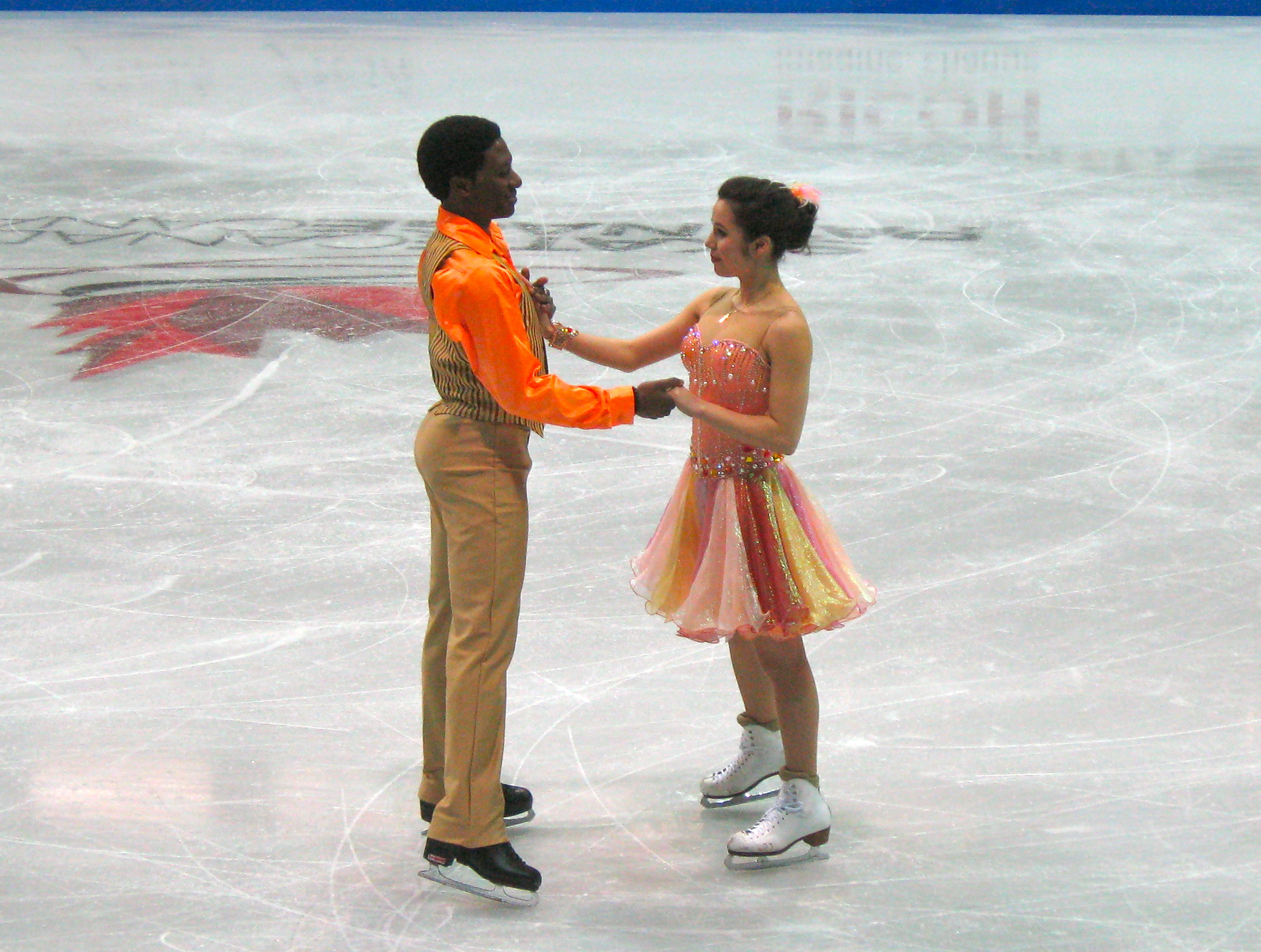
Hill/Ralph at the 2013 Canadian Championships

Asher Hill began skating at age four and took up ice dancing at ten. He skated as a solo dancer before finding a partner. He also competed as a single skater at the national level until 2009.

=== Partnership with Kharis Ralph ===
Hill teamed up with Kharis Ralph in 2002. The two won the Canadian pre-novice title in 2006 and the Canadian novice title in 2007. In 2007–08, they debuted on the ISU Junior Grand Prix series and became the 2008 Canadian junior champions.

Ralph/Hill were 8th at the 2008 World Junior Championships. The following season, they won two silver medals on the 2008–2009 ISU Junior Grand Prix circuit and rose to 5th at the World Junior Championships.

Ralph/Hill took another pair of silver medals on the 2009–10 ISU Junior Grand Prix series and placed 4th on the senior level at the 2010 Canadian Championships. They were assigned to their first senior ISU Championships, the 2010 Four Continents, where they placed 6th.

In 2011–12, Ralph/Hill won the bronze medal at the 2011 Nebelhorn Trophy. They were fourth at the 2012 Canadian Championships and were assigned to the 2012 World Championships. Ralph/Hill finished 13th at Worlds. Their partnership ended when Ralph retired from competition at the end of the 2013–14 season.

=== Partnership with Nicole Orford ===
Hill teamed up with Nicole Orford following a tryout held in April 2015. At the end of the 2015-2016 season, they announced their retirement on Hill's Instagram page.

== Programs ==
=== With Nicole Orford ===
Season	Short dance	Free dance
2015–2016	Jazz music featuring Etta James and Johnny Mathis choreo. by Carol Lane, Juris Razgulajevs	The Theory of Everything by Jóhann Jóhannsson choreo. by Megan Wing, Aaron Lowe

=== With Kharis Ralph ===
Season	Short dance	Free dance
2013–2014	The Lady Is a Tramp Album: The Ultimate Collection by Ella Fitzgerald; They Can't Take That Away From Me Album: The Best of Ella Fitzgerald & Louis Armstrong by Ella Fitzgerald and Louis Armstrong	Samba Vocalizado Album: Batucada Fantastica Vol. 3; Chorado Album: Brasileiro; Magalenha Album: Samba Percussion
2012–2013	Main Title: Gigi; Ice Skating Sequence by Frederick Loewe; Can Can by Jacques Offenbach	Barcelona by Freddie Mercury
2011–2012	Wanna Be Startin' Somethin' by Michael Jackson; Harlem Nocturne; Do You Only Wanna Dance	La Cosa Pequena; El Cholulio by Glover Gill
2010–2011	Ten Minutes Ago by Richard Rodgers, Oscar Hammerstein	Summertime by George Gershwin; Senie
2009–2010	African folk: Somlandela; Hlohonolofatsa performed by Soweto Gospel Choir	Marigold by Andrew Vintner; Waltz for Evelyn; Clef Club by Randy Newman
2008–2009	Foxtrot: They Can't Take That Away from Me by George and Ira Gershwin	And Then There Was Blues - St. James Infirmary Blues
2007–2008	South African folk dance: Umoja	Rainforest by Karl Jenkins

== Competitive highlights ==
GP: Grand Prix; JGP: Junior Grand Prix

=== With Orford ===
International
Event	2015–16
Autumn Classic	1st
National
Canadian Championships	5th
Skate Canada Challenge	5th

=== With Ralph ===
International
Event	2007–08	2008–09	2009–10	2010–11	2011–12	2012–13	2013–14
Worlds					13th		
Four Continents			6th				4th
GP Bompard				6th			
GP Cup of China				7th			
GP Skate America					5th		
GP Skate Canada						8th	
Cup of Nice							4th
Nebelhorn Trophy					3rd	7th	
International: Junior
Junior Worlds	8th	5th					
JGP Final		6th	4th				
JGP Croatia			2nd				
JGP France		2nd					
JGP Mexico		2nd					
JGP United Kingdom	7th						
JGP United States	4th		2nd				
National
Canadian Champ.	1st J.	5th	4th	4th	4th	5th	6th

=== Single skating ===
Event	2007–08	2008–09
Canadian Championships	13th J.	11th J.
