= Kira Geil =

Austrian ice dancer

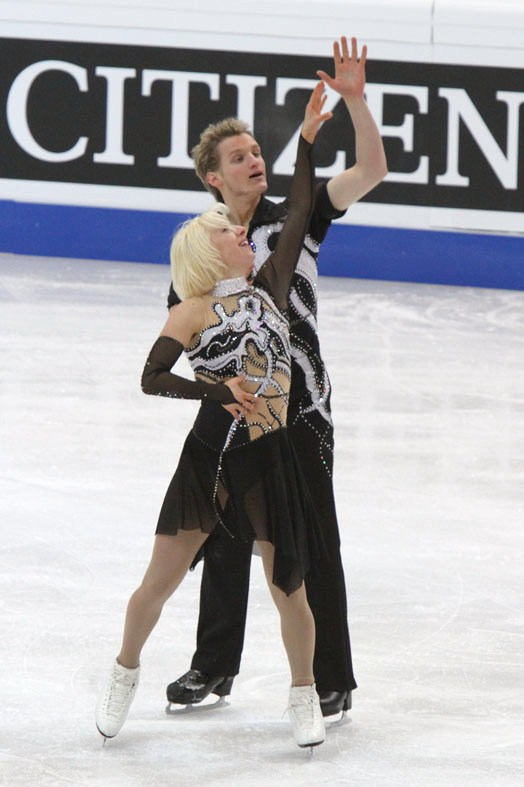
- Geil and Eisenbauer in 2011

Personal information
- Born: 12 June 1985 (age 41) Bridgend, Wales
- Height: 1.59 m (5 ft 3 in)

Figure skating career
- Country: Austria
- Partner: Tobias Eisenbauer
- Coach: Jana Huebler; Oliver Pekar
- Skating club: CEV Vienna
- Began skating: 1996
- Retired: 2014

Kira Geil (born 12 June 1985 in Bridgend, Wales) is a former competitive ice dancer who represented Austria with Tobias Eisenbauer.

In her early career, Geil represented Great Britain with Andrew Smykowski. She moved from Great Britain to Austria in 2009 and teamed up with Dmitri Matsjuk to represent Austria. In 2010, she teamed up with Tobias Eisenbauer.

== Programs ==
=== With Eisenbauer ===
Season	Short dance	Free dance
2013–2014	Quickstep: Bei Mir Bistu Shein; Charleston: Cinnamon Girl by Dunkelbent ft. Boban	Tarzan by Phil Collins, Mark Mancina: Two Worlds; Trashin' the Camp; Two Worlds Final
2012–2013	Heidi halt mi; Brenna tuats guat by Hubert von Goisern	Tarzan by Phil Collins, Mark Mancina: Two Worlds; Trashin' the Camp; Two Worlds Final
2011–2012	Chica Bum	Tron by Daft Punk
2010–2011	Said the Little Moment by Alma Cogan; New Vienna Woods by Bing Crosby, Rosemary Clooney	Music Was My First Love by John Miles

=== With Matsjuk ===
Season	Original dance	Free dance
2009–2010	Austrian folk dance: Kuckucks Jodler	Music by John Miles

=== With Smykowski ===
Season	Original dance	Free dance
2003–2004	Sing, Sing, Sing; You're Gonna Need Me; Sing, Sing, Sing	Toccata and Fugue in D Minor by Johann Sebastian Bach performed by Vanessa-Mae; Toccata by Sky

== Results ==
=== With Eisenbauer ===
Results
International
Event	2010–11	2011–12	2012–13	2013–14
World Championships	11th PR			
European Championships	10th PR		23rd	
Bavarian Open	4th	4th		
Finlandia Trophy		WD		
Golden Spin of Zagreb			14th	
Ice Challenge	8th			
Nebelhorn Trophy		9th		
Toruń Cup		3rd		
Trophy of Lyon	4th			
National
Austrian Championships	1st	2nd	1st	1st
PR = Preliminary round; WD = Withdrew

=== With Matsjuk ===
Results
International
Event	2009–2010
World Championships	19th
European Championships	17th
Nebelhorn Trophy	13th
Finlandia Trophy	9th
Ice Challenge	12th
Ondrej Nepela Memorial	8th
Mont Blanc Trophy	7th
National
Austrian Championships	1st

=== With Smykowski ===
Results
International
Event	2002–03	2003–04	2004–05	2005–06	2006–07	2007–08
Ondrej Nepela Memorial			5th	4th		
Golden Spin of Zagreb			5th		5th	
International: Junior
JGP Czech Republic		14th				
JGP Germany	13th					
National
British Championships	3rd J.	3rd J.	5th	3rd	4th	5th
J. = Junior level; JGP = Junior Grand Prix
