= Kharis Ralph =

Canadian ice dancer (born 1992)

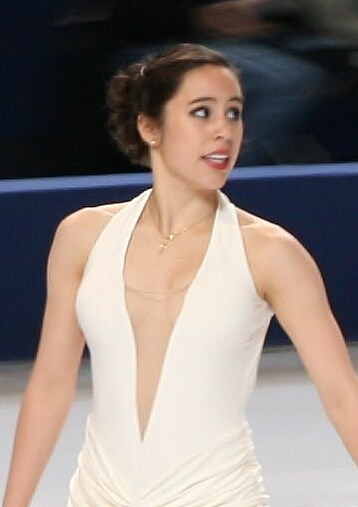
- Ralph in 2010.

Personal information
- Born: April 22, 1992 (age 34) Washington, D.C.
- Home town: Toronto, Ontario
- Height: 1.56 m (5 ft 1 in)

Figure skating career
- Country: Canada
- Skating club: Scarboro FSC
- Began skating: 1998
- Retired: May 12, 2014

Kharis Ralph (born April 22, 1992) is a Canadian former ice dancer. With Asher Hill, she is the 2008 Canadian national junior champion and 2011 Nebelhorn Trophy bronze medalist.

== Personal life ==
Kharis Ralph was born in Washington, D.C. but moved to Canada as a child. Her mother is from the Philippines.

Ralph received a Bachelor of the Arts as well as a Masters of the Arts at the University of Toronto, majoring in history and East Asian Studies. She is a current student at University of Wisconsin-Madison.

== Career ==
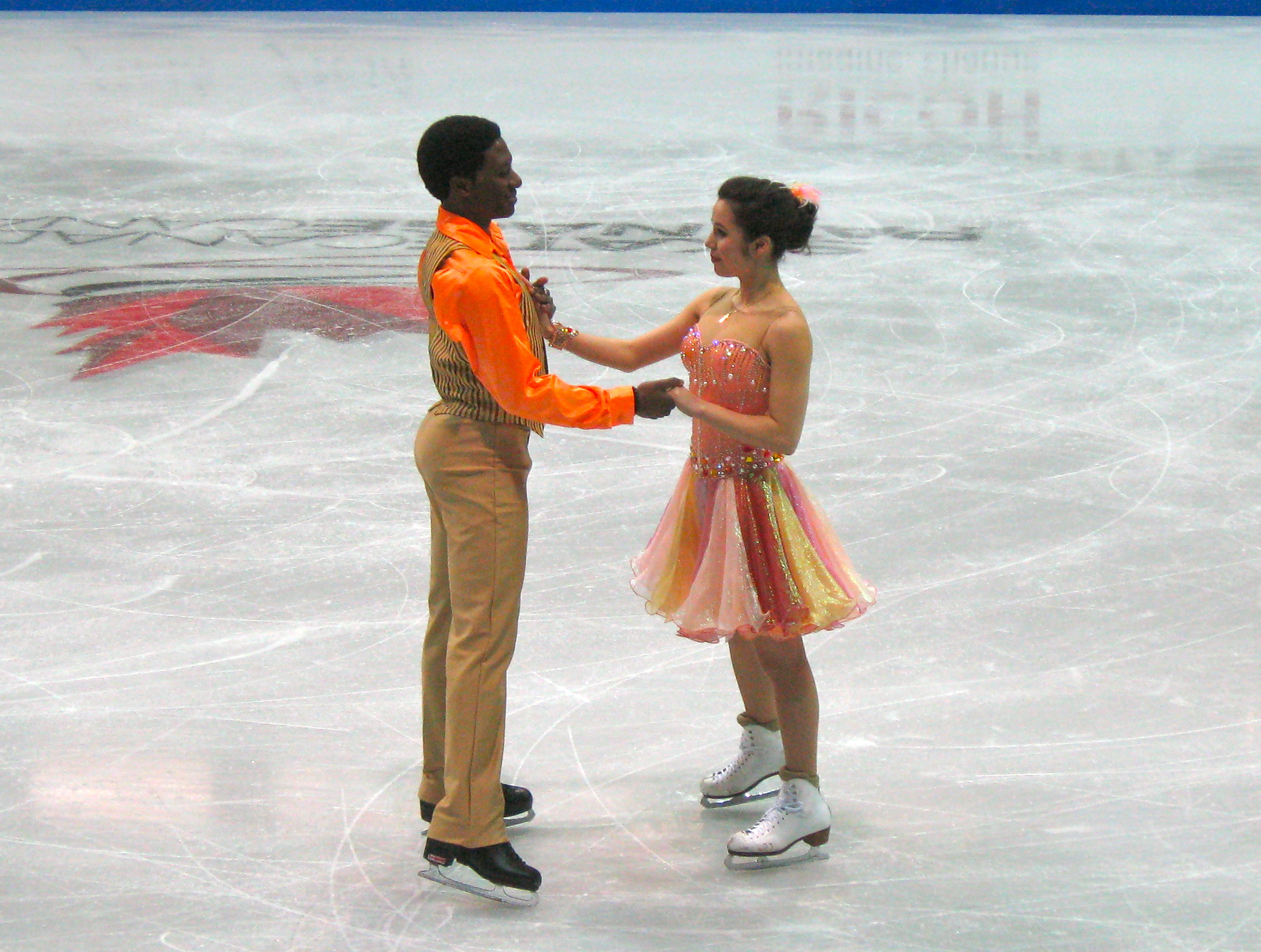
Ralph and Hill at the 2013 Canadian Championships

Kharis Ralph started skating at age six and began ice dancing a year later. She continued skating in singles for a few years before deciding to focus on ice dancing. She teamed up with Asher Hill in 2002.

Ralph and Hill won the Canadian pre-novice title in 2006 and the Canadian novice title in 2007. In 2007–08, they debuted on the ISU Junior Grand Prix series and became the 2008 Canadian junior champions. They were 8th at the 2008 World Junior Championships. The following season, they won two silver medals on the 2008–2009 ISU Junior Grand Prix circuit and rose to 5th at the World Junior Championships.

Ralph and Hill took another pair of silver medals on the 2009–2010 ISU Junior Grand Prix series and placed 4th on the senior level at the 2010 Canadian Championships. They were assigned to their first senior ISU Championships, the 2010 Four Continents, where they placed 6th.

In 2011–2012, Ralph and Hill won the bronze medal at the 2011 Nebelhorn Trophy. They were fourth at the 2012 Canadian Championships and were assigned to the 2012 World Championships. Ralph and Hill finished 13th at Worlds.

On May 12, 2014, Ralph announced that she had retired from competition.

== Programs ==
(with Hill)

Season	Short dance	Free dance	Exhibition
2013–2014	The Lady Is a Tramp Album: The Ultimate Collection by Ella Fitzgerald; They Can't Take That Away From Me Album: The Best of Ella Fitzgerald & Louis Armstrong by Ella Fitzgerald and Louis Armstrong	Samba Vocalizado Album: Batucada Fantastica Vol. 3; Chorado Album: Brasileiro; Magalenha Album: Samba Percussion	Bom Bom by Sam and the Womp
2012–2013	Main Title: Gigi; Ice Skating Sequence by Frederick Loewe; Can Can by Jacques Offenbach	Barcelona by Freddie Mercury	
2011–2012	Wanna Be Startin' Somethin' by Michael Jackson; Harlem Nocturne; Do You Only Wanna Dance	La Cosa Pequena; El Cholulio by Glover Gill	Nature Boy performed by Nat King Cole
2010–2011	Ten Minutes Ago by Richard Rodgers, Oscar Hammerstein	Summertime by George Gershwin; Senie	
2009–2010	African folk: Somlandela; Hlohonolofatsa performed by Soweto Gospel Choir	Marigold by Andrew Vintner; Waltz for Evelyn; Clef Club by Randy Newman	
2008–2009	Foxtrot: They Can't Take That Away from Me by George and Ira Gershwin	And Then There Was Blues - St. James Infirmary Blues	
2007–2008	South African folk dance: Umoja	Rainforest by Karl Jenkins	

== Competitive highlights ==
(with Hill)

Results
International
Event	2007–08	2008–09	2009–10	2010–11	2011–12	2012–13	2013–14
Worlds					13th		
Four Continents			6th				4th
GP Bompard				6th			
GP Cup of China				7th			
GP Skate America					5th		
GP Skate Canada						8th	
Cup of Nice							4th
Nebelhorn					3rd	7th	
International: Junior
Junior Worlds	8th	5th					
JGP Final		6th	4th				
JGP Croatia			2nd				
JGP France		2nd					
JGP Great Britain	7th						
JGP Mexico		2nd					
JGP USA	4th		2nd				
National
Canadians	1st J.	5th	4th	4th	4th	5th	6th
