= Victoria Muniz =

American figure skater

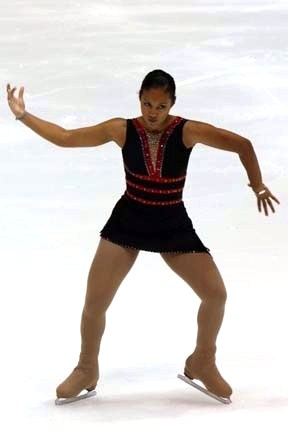
- Muniz at Lake Placid, 2007

Personal information
- Born: January 25, 1989 (age 37) Agana Heights, Guam
- Height: 5 ft 0 in (1.53 m)

Figure skating career
- Country: Puerto Rico
- Coach: Charlene Wong, Nedda Soltani, Marisol Brilliant

Victoria Muniz (born January 25, 1989, in Agana Heights, Guam) is an American figure skater who skated internationally for Puerto Rico. She qualified to the free skate at three ISU Championships — 2007 Junior Worlds, 2011 Four Continents, and 2012 Four Continents. She is a four-time Puerto Rican national champion, having won the title in 2005, 2007, 2009, and 2011.

Muniz competed on the ISU Junior Grand Prix circuit for two seasons. She made her senior debut at the 2008 World Championships in Gothenburg, Sweden, and went on to compete in the 2009 World Championships in Los Angeles, her training town. Muniz was the first skater to represent Puerto Rico at an ISU Championship, doing so at the 2006 World Junior Championships.

== Programs ==
Season	Short program	Free skating	Exhibition
2011–2012	Concierto para bongos by Pérez Prado	Sheherazade by Nikolai Rimsky-Korsakov	
2010–2011	Prelude by Jesse Cook; Edony by Africanism	Piano Concerto No. 2, 3rd Movement by Sergei Rachmaninoff	
2009–2010	Prelude by Jesse Cook; Edony by Africanism	Westside Story by Leonard Bernstein	
2008–2009	Cirque du Soleil by Rene Dupere; L'Oiseau; Eclipse	Piano Fantasy by William Joseph; Waltz in the Evening Glow by Tashi Kako	
2007–2008	Scott and Fran's Paso Doble (from Strictly Ballroom) by David Hirschfelder, The Bogo Pogo Orchestra	Tocata in Fog; Tootin' Carmen by Deviations Project; Art on Ice by Edvin Marton	Please Remember by LeAnn Rimes
2006–2007	Scott and Fran's Paso Doble (from Strictly Ballroom) by David Hirschfelder, The Bogo Pogo Orchestra	Ninkou Latora (from Cirque du Soleil) by Violaine Corradi; Piano Fantasy by William Joseph	Wild Horses by Natasha Redingfield

== Results ==
JGP: Junior Grand Prix

International
Event	05–06	06–07	07–08	08–09	09–10	10–11	11–12
World Champ.			29th	43rd	31st		25th
Four Continents Champ.						17th	12th
Cup of Nice							6th
Golden Spin						5th	11th
Nebelhorn Trophy				19th		8th	17th
Nepela Memorial					5th	8th	
International: Junior
World Junior Champ.	16th P	17th					
JGP Andorra	18th						
JGP Bulgaria	10th						
JGP Mexico		11th					
JGP Netherlands		10th					
JGP United Kingdom			15th				
JGP United States			12th				
Copenhagen Trophy	7th J						
National
Puerto Rican Champ.	1st		1st		1st	1st	
J = Junior level; P = Preliminary round
