= Louise Walden =

British ice dancer

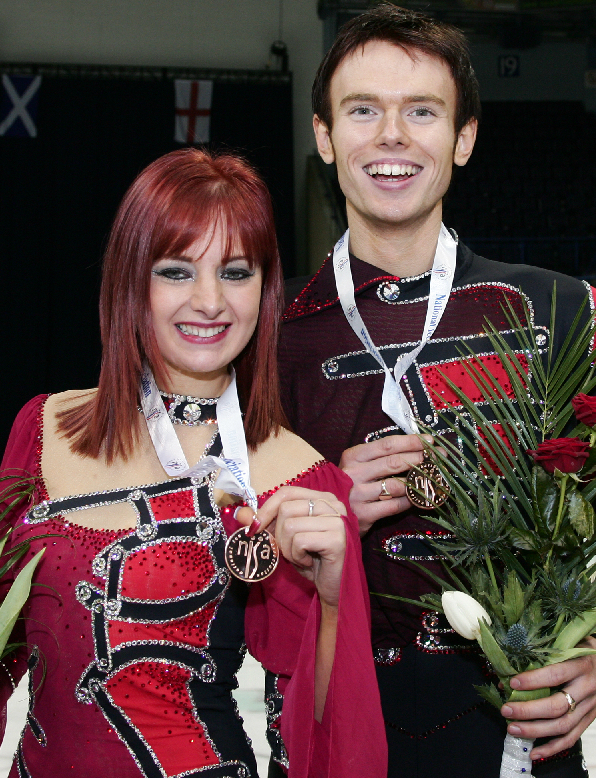
- Walden and Edwards in 2009.

Personal information
- Born: 19 August 1983 (age 42) Preston, England
- Height: 1.60 m (5 ft 3 in)
- Spouse: Owen Edwards

Figure skating career
- Country: United Kingdom
- Partner: Owen Edwards; Jamie Whyte; Edward Throp; James-Anthony Peatfield
- Coach: Galit Chait; Muriel Boucher-Zazoui; Romain Haguenauer; Olivier Schoenfelder; Joan Slater
- Skating club: CSGL
- Began skating: 1994
- Retired: 2013

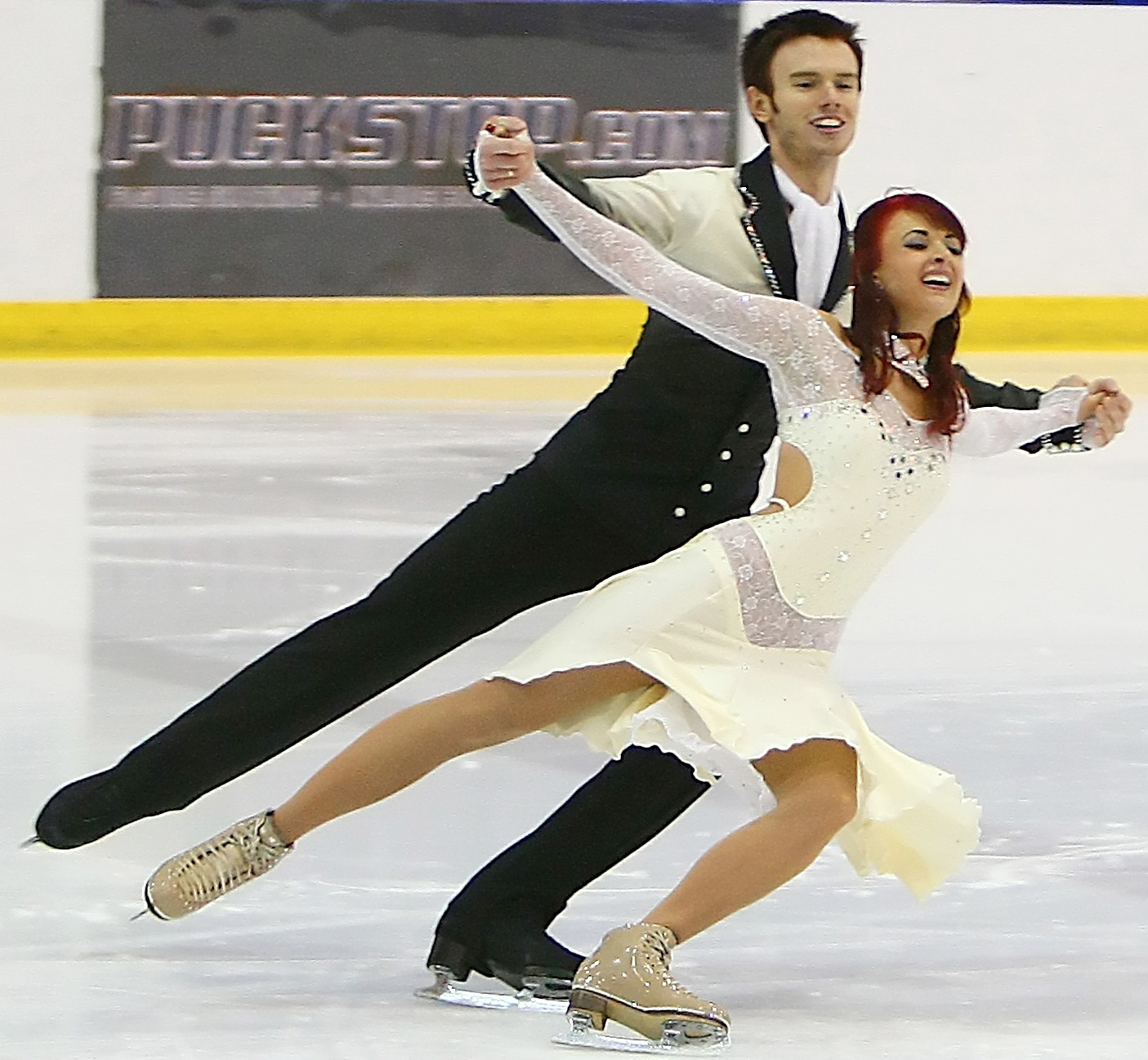

Louise Walden (born 19 August 1983) is a British former competitive ice dancer. With Owen Edwards, she won gold at the 2010 Ice Challenge, 2010 International Trophy of Lyon, and 2011 British Championships. They competed in the final segment at two ISU Championships – 2011 Worlds, where they finished 20th, and 2012 Europeans, where they placed 13th. Walden is a sports commentator for Eurosport and Discovery Plus, as well as an on and off ice skating coach and choreographer. She has also worked in professional shows.

Walden is a sports commentator for Eurosport and Discovery Plus, as well as an on-and-off ice skating coach and choreographer. She has also worked in professional shows.

Walden and Edwards married in May 2016 and live in Lancashire, United Kingdom with their two sons, born in 2018 and 2021.

== Career ==
Walden and Edwards began skating together in June 2006. They made their international debut in October 2008 at the 2008 Karl Schaefer Memorial in Vienna, Austria, where they placed 8th. Between April 2008 and September 2012, they were based at CSG Lyon International Skating Academy in France, where they were coached by Muriel Boucher-Zazoui, Romain Haguenauer and Olivier Schoenfelder. They won the British national title in the 2010–2011 season. At the 2011 World Championships in Moscow, they qualified to the final segment and finished 20th overall.

Walden/Edwards placed 13th at the 2012 European Championships in Sheffield, England. In September 2012, the duo moved to Hackensack, New Jersey, to train under Galit Chait. In May 2013, they took to their official website to announce their retirement from competitive skating.

Walden and Edwards were ranked fifth in the 2009/2010 UK national rankings and second in 2010/2011.

After retiring from competitive skating in 2013, Walden and Edwards turned professional, skating as principal performers in many ice shows. After this Louise continued to work professionally in Performance Management.

In 2018 Walden began her commenting career for Eurosport and has covered many events such as the Winter Universiade, ISU Grand Prix Events, European Championships, World Championships, and the 2022 Winter Olympics.

Walden also works as an on-and-off ice figure skating coach and choreographer, based in the UK

== Programs ==
(with Edwards)

Season	Original dance	Free dance
2011–2012	Conga; I'm Not Giving You Up by Gloria Estefan	Love Actually; Burlesque: Burlesque by Cher; But I Am A Good Girl; Show Me How You Burlesque by Christina Aguilera
2010–2011	Runaway by The Corrs	Good Bye Lenin!; Mother's Journey; Lara's Castle; The Decant Session/The Deutschmark is Coming; Preparations for the Last TV Fake by Yann Tiersen

== Competitive highlights ==
(with Edwards)

International
Event	06–07	07–08	08–09	09–10	10–11	11–12	12–13
Worlds					20th		
Europeans						13th	
Cup of Nice					5th	5th	
Ice Challenge				11th	1st	6th	11th
Karl Schäfer			8th				
Nebelhorn					12th	10th	
NRW Trophy				7th	6th		7th
Ondrej Nepela			7th		8th	8th	
Pavel Roman							7th
Trophy of Lyon					1st	3rd	
Universiade			13th		5th		
National
British Champ.	5th	4th	3rd	5th	1st	2nd	3rd
Welsh Champ.					1st		
