= Owen Edwards (figure skater) =

Welsh ice dancer

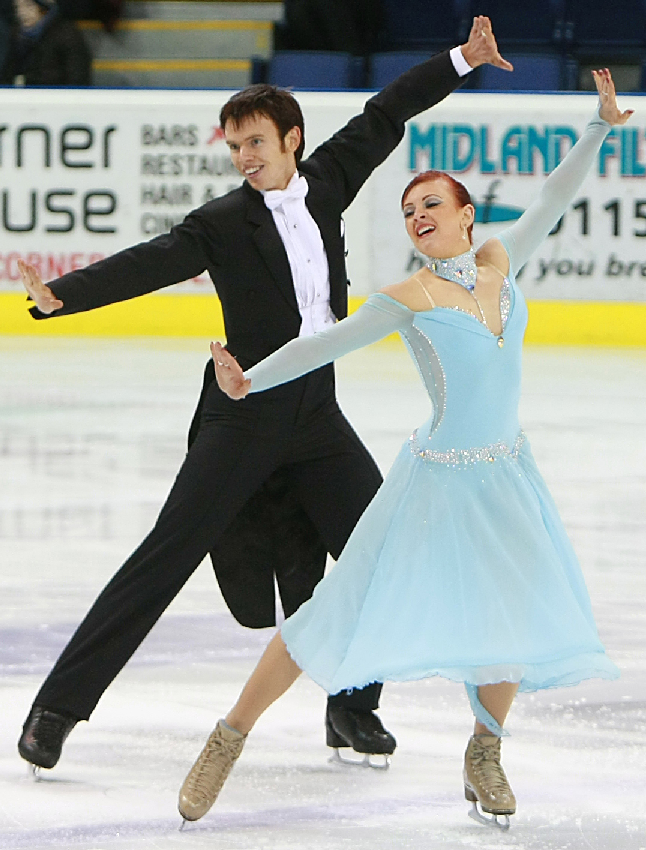
- Walden and Edwards in 2009.

Personal information
- Born: 21 July 1987 (age 38) Wrexham, Wales
- Height: 1.80 m (5 ft 11 in)

Figure skating career
- Country: United Kingdom
- Partner: Louise Walden; Zelda-Aurora Roper; Lindsey Woolstencroft; Naomi Hitchmough
- Coach: Galit Chait; Muriel Boucher-Zazoui; Romain Haguenauer; Olivier Schoenfelder; Joan Slater
- Skating club: Deeside ISC
- Began skating: 1995
- Retired: 2013

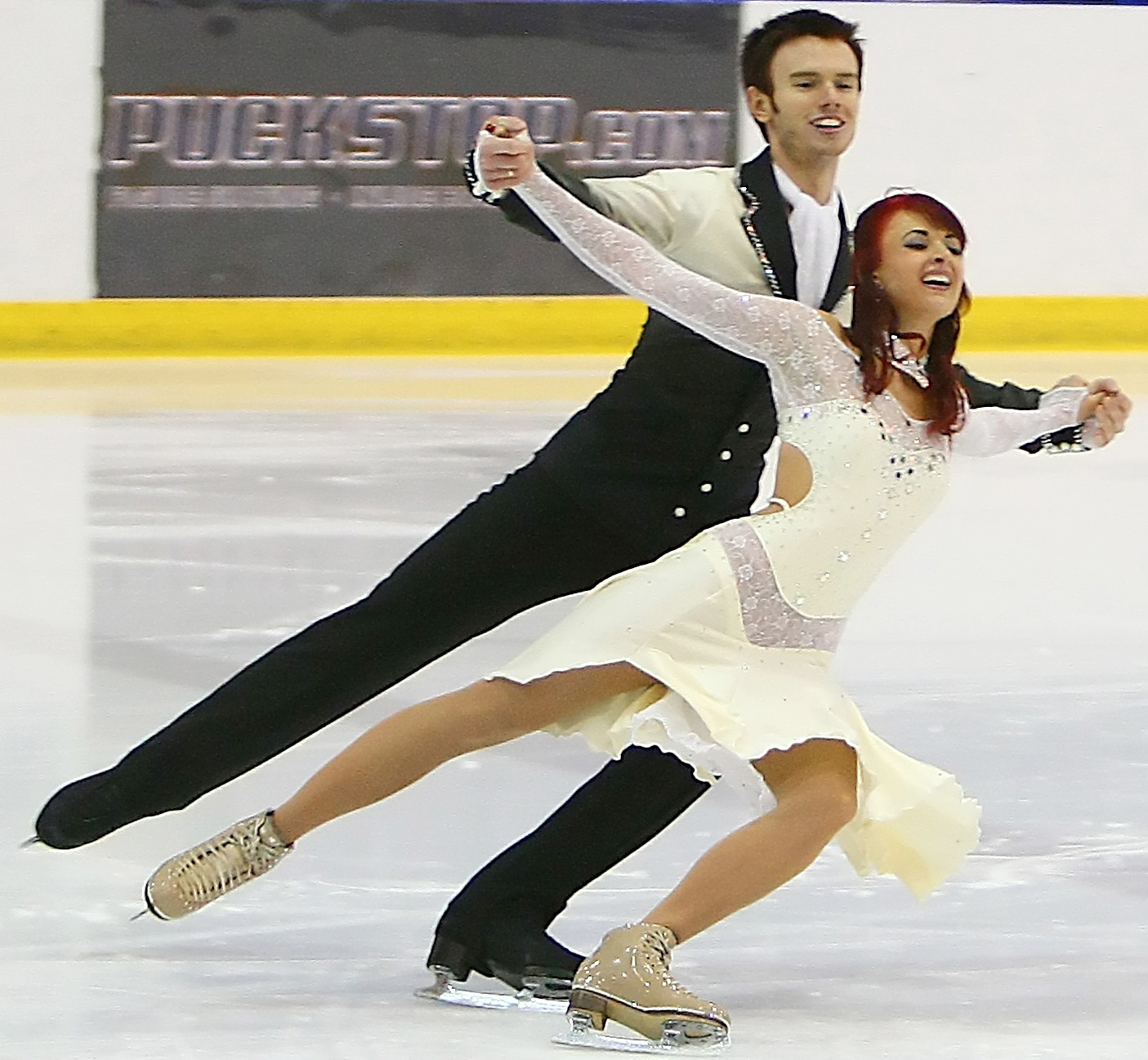

Owen Edwards (born 21 July 1987) is a Welsh retired ice dancer who competed for Great Britain. With Louise Walden, he won gold at the 2010 Ice Challenge, 2010 International Trophy of Lyon, and 2011 British Championships. They competed in the final segment at two ISU Championships – 2011 Worlds, where they finished 20th, and 2012 Europeans, where they placed 13th.

== Career ==
Walden and Edwards began skating together in June 2006. They made their international debut in October 2008 at the 2008 Karl Schaefer Memorial in Vienna, Austria, where they placed 8th. Between April 2008 and September 2012, they were based at CSG Lyon International Skating Academy in France, where they were coached by Muriel Boucher-Zazoui, Romain Haguenauer and Olivier Schoenfelder. They won the British national title in the 2010–2011 season. At the 2011 World Championships in Moscow, they qualified to the final segment and finished 20th overall.

Walden/Edwards placed 13th at the 2012 European Championships in Sheffield, England. In September 2012, the duo moved to Hackensack, New Jersey, to train under Galit Chait. In May 2013, the couple took to their official website to announce their retirement from competitive skating.

Walden and Edwards were ranked 5th in the 2009/2010 UK national rankings and 2nd in 2010/2011.

Edwards works as a skating coach in the UK.

== Programs ==
(with Walden)

Season	Original dance	Free dance
2011–2012	Conga; I'm Not Giving You Up by Gloria Estefan	Love Actually; Burlesque: Burlesque by Cher; But I Am A Good Girl; Show Me How You Burlesque by Christina Aguilera
2010–2011	Runaway by The Corrs	Good Bye Lenin!; Mother's Journey; Lara's Castle; The Decant Session/The Deutschmark is Coming; Preparations for the Last TV Fake by Yann Tiersen

== Competitive highlights ==
(with Walden)

International
Event	06–07	07–08	08–09	09–10	10–11	11–12	12–13
Worlds					20th		
Europeans						13th	
Cup of Nice					5th	5th	
Ice Challenge				11th	1st	6th	11th
Karl Schäfer			8th				
Nebelhorn					12th	10th	
NRW Trophy				7th	6th		7th
Ondrej Nepela			7th		8th	8th	
Pavel Roman							7th
Trophy of Lyon					1st	3rd	
Universiade			13th		5th		
National
British Champ.	5th	4th	3rd	5th	1st	2nd	3rd
Welsh Champ.					1st		
