= Tobias Eisenbauer =

Austrian ice dancer

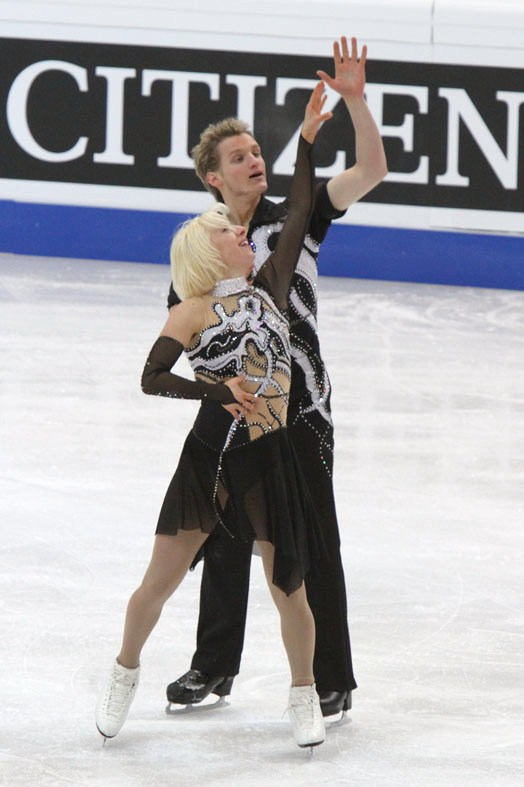
- Geil and Eisenbauer in 2011

Personal information
- Born: 6 February 1991 (age 35) Baden
- Home town: Vienna
- Height: 1.74 m (5 ft 9 in)

Figure skating career
- Country: Austria
- Partner: Kira Geil
- Coach: Jana Huebler; Oliver Pekar
- Skating club: Wiener Eislauf-Verein
- Began skating: 1995

Tobias Eisenbauer (born 6 February 1991) is an Austrian ice dancer. With partner Kira Geil, he is the 2011 Austrian champion.

Previously, he skated with Sonja Pauli with whom he teamed up in September 2006.

== Programs ==
=== With Geil ===
Season	Short dance	Free dance
2013–2014	Quickstep: Bei Mir Bistu Shein; Charleston: Cinnamon Girl by Dunkelbent ft. Boban	Tarzan by Phil Collins, Mark Mancina: Two Worlds; Trashin' the Camp; Two Worlds Final
2012–2013	Heidi halt mi; Brenna tuats guat by Hubert von Goisern	Tarzan by Phil Collins, Mark Mancina: Two Worlds; Trashin' the Camp; Two Worlds Final
2011–2012	Chica Bum	Tron by Daft Punk
2010–2011	Said the Little Moment by Alma Cogan; New Vienna Woods by Bing Crosby, Rosemary Clooney	Music Was My First Love by John Miles

=== With Pauli ===
Season	Original dance	Free dance
2009–2010	Austrian polka medley by Die Edlseer	San Francisco Bay; Power of Love by Chris Norman
2008–2009	Ich hab kein Auto, ich hab kein Rittergut by Hans May	Roméo et Juliette, de la Haine à l'Amour by Gerard Presgurvic
2007–2008	Austrian polka medley by Die Edlseer	Roméo et Juliette, de la Haine à l'Amour by Gerard Presgurvic

== Results ==
=== With Geil ===
Results
International
Event	2010–11	2011–12	2012–13	2013–14
World Championships	11th PR			
European Championships	10th PR		23rd	
Bavarian Open	4th	4th		
Finlandia Trophy		WD		
Golden Spin of Zagreb			14th	
Ice Challenge	8th			
Nebelhorn Trophy		9th		
Toruń Cup		3rd		
Trophy of Lyon	4th			
National
Austrian Championships	1st	2nd	1st	1st
PR = Preliminary round; WD = Withdrew

=== With Pauli ===
Results
International
Event	2007–08	2008–09	2009–10
World Junior Championships	28th	16th	21st
JGP Austria	16th		
JGP Bulgaria	14th		
JGP Croatia			13th
JGP Great Britain		12th	
JGP Spain		13th	
JGP Turkey			13th
Ice Challenge			4th J.
NRW Trophy	12th J.		
Pavel Roman	17th J.		
Santa Claus Cup		5th J.	5th J.
Bavarian Open		2nd J.	2nd J.
National
Austrian Championships		1st J.	1st J.
J. = Junior level
