= 2016–17 ISU Season's World Ranking =

Merit-based ice skating ranking

2016–17 ISU World Standings and Season's World Ranking
Season-end No. 1 skaters
- Men's singles: (Japan) Yuzuru Hanyu
- Ladies' singles: (Russia) Evgenia Medvedeva
- Pairs: (Canada) Meagan Duhamel / Eric Radford
- Ice dance: (United States) Madison Chock / Evan Bates

Season's No. 1 skaters
- Men's singles: (Japan) Yuzuru Hanyu
- Ladies' singles: (Russia) Evgenia Medvedeva
- Pairs: (Russia) Evgenia Tarasova / Vladimir Morozov
- Ice dance: (Canada) Tessa Virtue / Scott Moir

Season-end No. 1 teams
- Senior Synchronized: (Russia) Team Paradise
- Junior Synchronized: (United States) Team Skyliners Junior

Navigation

The 2016–17 ISU Season's World Ranking is based on the results of the 2016–17 season only.

== Season's World Ranking ==
The remainder of this section is a complete list, by discipline, published by the ISU.

=== Men's singles (135 skaters) ===
As of 1 April 2017

Rank	Nation	Skater	Points	Season	ISU Championships or Olympics	(Junior) Grand Prix and Final		Selected International Competition	
Rank	Nation	Skater	Points	Season	Best	Best	2nd Best	Best	2nd Best
1	JPN	Yuzuru Hanyu	2700	2016/2017 season (100%)	1200	800	400	300	0
2	JPN	Shoma Uno	2428	2016/2017 season (100%)	1080	648	400	300	0
3	USA	Nathan Chen	2220	2016/2017 season (100%)	840	720	360	300	0
4	CAN	Patrick Chan	1982	2016/2017 season (100%)	787	525	400	270	0
5	ESP	Javier Fernandez	1858	2016/2017 season (100%)	875	583	400	0	0
6	USA	Jason Brown	1781	2016/2017 season (100%)	638	360	213	300	270
7	ISR	Alexei Bychenko	1692	2016/2017 season (100%)	551	324	292	300	225
8	CHN	Boyang Jin	1594	2016/2017 season (100%)	972	360	262	0	0
9	RUS	Mikhail Kolyada	1453	2016/2017 season (100%)	680	292	262	219	0
10	RUS	Maxim Kovtun	1425	2016/2017 season (100%)	756	213	213	243	0
11	BEL	Jorik Hendrickx	1368	2016/2017 season (100%)	612	236	0	270	250
12	RUS	Alexander Petrov	1333	2016/2017 season (100%)	365	236	213	300	219
13	RUS	Dmitri Aliev	1320	2016/2017 season (100%)	450	350	250	270	0
14	FRA	Chafik Besseghier	1244	2016/2017 season (100%)	362	191	191	250	250
15	ISR	Daniel Samohin	1221	2016/2017 season (100%)	295	262	191	270	203
16	RUS	Alexander Samarin	1220	2016/2017 season (100%)	405	315	250	250	0
17	USA	Vincent Zhou	1178	2016/2017 season (100%)	500	225	203	250	0
18	UZB	Misha Ge	1165	2016/2017 season (100%)	446	236	213	270	0
19	CAN	Kevin Reynolds	1111	2016/2017 season (100%)	517	324	0	270	0
20	RUS	Roman Savosin	1048	2016/2017 season (100%)	0	255	250	300	243
21	USA	Max Aaron	1040	2016/2017 season (100%)	0	292	262	243	243
22	USA	Adam Rippon	1039	2016/2017 season (100%)	0	472	324	243	0
23	CAN	Nam Nguyen	1027	2016/2017 season (100%)	402	236	191	198	0
24	JPN	Keiji Tanaka	1024	2016/2017 season (100%)	237	324	213	250	0
25	GEO	Moris Kvitelashvili	949	2016/2017 season (100%)	496	0	0	250	203
26	LAT	Deniss Vasiljevs	932	2016/2017 season (100%)	446	236	0	250	0
27	RUS	Sergei Voronov	916	2016/2017 season (100%)	0	324	292	300	0
28	KOR	Jun Hwan Cha	862	2016/2017 season (100%)	328	284	250	0	0
29	FRA	Kevin Aymoz	846	2016/2017 season (100%)	266	182	148	250	0
30	SWE	Alexander Majorov	843	2016/2017 season (100%)	293	0	0	300	250
31	USA	Grant Hochstein	803	2016/2017 season (100%)	362	0	0	243	198
32	UKR	Ivan Pavlov	779	2016/2017 season (100%)	214	182	133	250	0
33	GER	Paul Fentz	753	2016/2017 season (100%)	325	0	0	225	203
34	GEO	Irakli Maysuradze	731	2016/2017 season (100%)	0	148	133	225	225
35	ITA	Matteo Rizzo	726	2016/2017 season (100%)	174	120	0	250	182
36	JPN	Takahito Mura	723	2016/2017 season (100%)	0	262	191	270	0
37	GBR	Graham Newberry	721	2016/2017 season (100%)	173	120	0	225	203
38	USA	Alexei Krasnozhon	719	2016/2017 season (100%)	239	250	230	0	0
39	AUS	Brendan Kerry	710	2016/2017 season (100%)	293	0	0	219	198
40	USA	Andrew Torgashev	650	2016/2017 season (100%)	0	225	182	243	0
41	SUI	Stephane Walker	649	2016/2017 season (100%)	156	0	0	250	243
42	CAN	Roman Sadovsky	642	2016/2017 season (100%)	93	225	164	160	0
43	MAS	Julian Zhi Jie Yee	614	2016/2017 season (100%)	192	0	0	219	203
44	KAZ	Denis Ten	607	2016/2017 season (100%)	247	360	0	0	0
45	ITA	Maurizio Zandron	601	2016/2017 season (100%)	126	0	0	250	225
46	JPN	Kazuki Tomono	600	2016/2017 season (100%)	215	203	182	0	0
47	CHN	Han Yan	587	2016/2017 season (100%)	325	262	0	0	0
48	KOR	Jinseo Kim	559	2016/2017 season (100%)	156	0	0	225	178
49	CZE	Michal Brezina	556	2016/2017 season (100%)	264	292	0	0	0
50	USA	Timothy Dolensky	529	2016/2017 season (100%)	0	191	0	178	160
51	UKR	Yaroslav Paniot	522	2016/2017 season (100%)	194	164	164	0	0
52	JPN	Koshiro Shimada	512	2016/2017 season (100%)	127	203	182	0	0
53	RUS	Anton Shulepov	495	2016/2017 season (100%)	0	0	0	270	225
54	ESP	Javier Raya	482	2016/2017 season (100%)	140	0	0	182	160
55	CAN	Conrad Orzel	463	2016/2017 season (100%)	141	225	97	0	0
56	CAN	Keegan Messing	462	2016/2017 season (100%)	0	0	0	243	219
57	RUS	Ilia Skirda	450	2016/2017 season (100%)	0	225	225	0	0
58	GBR	Harry Mattick	414	2016/2017 season (100%)	0	0	0	250	164
59	TPE	Chih-I Tsao	410	2016/2017 season (100%)	126	120	0	164	0
60	GER	Peter Liebers	407	2016/2017 season (100%)	0	0	0	225	182
60	GBR	Phillip Harris	407	2016/2017 season (100%)	0	0	0	225	182
62	SWE	Ondrej Spiegl	389	2016/2017 season (100%)	0	0	0	225	164
63	AZE	Larry Loupolover	385	2016/2017 season (100%)	0	0	0	203	182
64	CAN	Elladj Balde	380	2016/2017 season (100%)	0	236	0	144	0
65	PHI	Michael Christian Martinez	378	2016/2017 season (100%)	214	0	0	164	0
66	ITA	Dario Betti	367	2016/2017 season (100%)	0	0	0	203	164
66	JPN	Mitsuki Sumoto	367	2016/2017 season (100%)	0	203	164	0	0
68	RUS	Petr Gumennik	346	2016/2017 season (100%)	0	182	164	0	0
69	KAZ	Abzal Rakimgaliev	342	2016/2017 season (100%)	0	0	0	182	160
70	CZE	Jiri Belohradsky	330	2016/2017 season (100%)	113	120	97	0	0
71	ITA	Alessandro Fadini	328	2016/2017 season (100%)	0	0	0	164	164
72	KOR	June Hyoung Lee	322	2016/2017 season (100%)	140	0	0	182	0
72	SUI	Lukas Britschgi	322	2016/2017 season (100%)	0	97	0	225	0
74	CAN	Joseph Phan	312	2016/2017 season (100%)	0	164	148	0	0
75	CZE	Matyas Belohradsky	311	2016/2017 season (100%)	0	203	108	0	0
76	CRO	Nicholas Vrdoljak	308	2016/2017 season (100%)	0	0	0	164	144
76	EST	Samuel Koppel	308	2016/2017 season (100%)	0	0	0	164	144
78	ARM	Slavik Hayrapetyan	305	2016/2017 season (100%)	102	0	0	203	0
79	RUS	Artem Kovalev	296	2016/2017 season (100%)	0	148	148	0	0
80	EST	Daniel Albert Naurits	295	2016/2017 season (100%)	92	0	0	203	0
81	KOR	Sihyeong Lee	293	2016/2017 season (100%)	173	120	0	0	0
82	ITA	Daniel Grassl	266	2016/2017 season (100%)	0	133	133	0	0
83	FIN	Valtter Virtanen	247	2016/2017 season (100%)	83	0	0	164	0
84	ITA	Ivan Righini	237	2016/2017 season (100%)	237	0	0	0	0
85	JPN	Hiroaki Sato	225	2016/2017 season (100%)	0	0	0	225	0
85	RUS	Igor Efimchuk	225	2016/2017 season (100%)	0	0	0	225	0
85	USA	Jordan Moeller	225	2016/2017 season (100%)	0	0	0	225	0
85	CHN	Tangxu Li	225	2016/2017 season (100%)	61	164	0	0	0
89	JPN	Daisuke Murakami	219	2016/2017 season (100%)	0	0	0	219	0
89	POL	Igor Reznichenko	219	2016/2017 season (100%)	0	0	0	219	0
89	RUS	Pavel Vyugov	219	2016/2017 season (100%)	0	0	0	219	0
92	CZE	Petr Kotlarik	213	2016/2017 season (100%)	49	0	0	164	0
93	RUS	Alexey Erokhov	203	2016/2017 season (100%)	0	203	0	0	0
93	RUS	Artem Lezheev	203	2016/2017 season (100%)	0	0	0	203	0
93	ESP	Felipe Montoya	203	2016/2017 season (100%)	0	0	0	203	0
93	RUS	Makar Ignatov	203	2016/2017 season (100%)	0	0	0	203	0
93	FRA	Romain Ponsart	203	2016/2017 season (100%)	0	0	0	203	0
93	JPN	Shu Nakamura	203	2016/2017 season (100%)	0	0	0	203	0
99	CAN	Bennet Toman	198	2016/2017 season (100%)	0	0	0	198	0
100	RUS	Gordei Gorshkov	198	2016/2017 season (100%)	0	0	0	198	0
100	CAN	Liam Firus	198	2016/2017 season (100%)	0	0	0	198	0
102	NOR	Sondre Oddvoll Bøe	195	2016/2017 season (100%)	75	120	0	0	0
103	SWE	Marcus Björk	182	2016/2017 season (100%)	0	0	0	182	0
103	RUS	Murad Kurbanov	182	2016/2017 season (100%)	0	0	0	182	0
103	JPN	Ryuju Hino	182	2016/2017 season (100%)	0	0	0	182	0
103	CZE	Tomas Kupka	182	2016/2017 season (100%)	0	0	0	182	0
107	FRA	Adrien Tesson	178	2016/2017 season (100%)	0	0	0	178	0
107	USA	Alexander Johnson	178	2016/2017 season (100%)	0	0	0	178	0
107	RUS	Artur Dmitriev	178	2016/2017 season (100%)	0	0	0	178	0
107	USA	Ross Miner	178	2016/2017 season (100%)	0	0	0	178	0
111	ITA	Adrien Bannister	164	2016/2017 season (100%)	0	0	0	164	0
111	ITA	Alberto Vanz	164	2016/2017 season (100%)	0	0	0	164	0
113	USA	Sean Rabbitt	160	2016/2017 season (100%)	0	0	0	160	0
114	CAN	Nicolas Nadeau	157	2016/2017 season (100%)	157	0	0	0	0
115	ISR	Mark Gorodnitsky	152	2016/2017 season (100%)	55	97	0	0	0
116	EST	Aleksandr Selevko	148	2016/2017 season (100%)	0	148	0	0	0
116	USA	Tomoki Hiwatashi	148	2016/2017 season (100%)	0	148	0	0	0
118	GER	Thomas Stoll	141	2016/2017 season (100%)	44	97	0	0	0
119	USA	Eric Sjoberg	133	2016/2017 season (100%)	0	133	0	0	0
119	USA	Kevin Shum	133	2016/2017 season (100%)	0	133	0	0	0
119	PRK	Kum Chol Han	133	2016/2017 season (100%)	0	133	0	0	0
122	CHN	Yuheng Li	120	2016/2017 season (100%)	0	120	0	0	0
123	AUS	Andrew Dodds	113	2016/2017 season (100%)	113	0	0	0	0
124	USA	Camden Pulkinen	108	2016/2017 season (100%)	0	108	0	0	0
124	MEX	Donovan Carrillo	108	2016/2017 season (100%)	0	108	0	0	0
124	CAN	Edrian Paul Celestino	108	2016/2017 season (100%)	0	108	0	0	0
124	USA	Oleksiy Melnyk	108	2016/2017 season (100%)	0	108	0	0	0
124	USA	William Hubbart	108	2016/2017 season (100%)	0	108	0	0	0
124	JPN	Yuto Kishina	108	2016/2017 season (100%)	0	108	0	0	0
130	AUS	Mark Webster	102	2016/2017 season (100%)	102	0	0	0	0
131	FRA	Luc Economides	97	2016/2017 season (100%)	0	97	0	0	0
131	SWE	Nikolaj Majorov	97	2016/2017 season (100%)	0	97	0	0	0
133	HKG	Leslie Man Cheuk Ip	92	2016/2017 season (100%)	92	0	0	0	0
134	MAS	Kai Xiang Chew	83	2016/2017 season (100%)	83	0	0	0	0
135	TPE	Micah Tang	74	2016/2017 season (100%)	74	0	0	0	0

=== Ladies' singles (153 skaters) ===
As of 31 March 2017

Rank	Nation	Skater	Points	Season	ISU Championships or Olympics	(Junior) Grand Prix and Final		Selected International Competition	
Rank	Nation	Skater	Points	Season	Best	Best	2nd Best	Best	2nd Best
1	RUS	Evgenia Medvedeva	2400	2016/2017 season (100%)	1200	800	400	0	0
2	CAN	Kaetlyn Osmond	2323	2016/2017 season (100%)	1080	583	360	300	0
3	RUS	Anna Pogorilaya	2047	2016/2017 season (100%)	756	648	400	243	0
4	CAN	Gabrielle Daleman	1799	2016/2017 season (100%)	972	292	292	243	0
5	RUS	Maria Sotskova	1797	2016/2017 season (100%)	612	525	360	300	0
6	JPN	Mai Mihara	1756	2016/2017 season (100%)	840	324	292	300	0
7	USA	Karen Chen	1727	2016/2017 season (100%)	875	236	213	243	160
8	USA	Mirai Nagasu	1485	2016/2017 season (100%)	680	262	0	300	243
9	JPN	Satoko Miyahara	1380	2016/2017 season (100%)	0	720	360	300	0
10	KAZ	Elizabet Tursynbaeva	1373	2016/2017 season (100%)	517	262	191	243	160
11	USA	Mariah Bell	1369	2016/2017 season (100%)	496	360	0	270	243
12	JPN	Wakaba Higuchi	1334	2016/2017 season (100%)	418	324	292	300	0
13	JPN	Rika Hongo	1292	2016/2017 season (100%)	325	262	236	250	219
14	FRA	Laurine Lecavelier	1287	2016/2017 season (100%)	551	236	0	250	250
15	USA	Ashley Wagner	1274	2016/2017 season (100%)	638	400	236	0	0
16	ITA	Carolina Kostner	1259	2016/2017 season (100%)	709	0	0	300	250
17	KOR	Dabin Choi	1208	2016/2017 season (100%)	551	213	0	225	219
18	RUS	Elizaveta Tuktamysheva	1156	2016/2017 season (100%)	0	324	292	270	270
19	RUS	Alina Zagitova	1100	2016/2017 season (100%)	500	350	250	0	0
20	RUS	Stanislava Konstantinova	1002	2016/2017 season (100%)	295	225	182	300	0
21	JPN	Kaori Sakamoto	939	2016/2017 season (100%)	405	284	250	0	0
22	CHN	Zijun Li	929	2016/2017 season (100%)	446	292	191	0	0
23	BEL	Loena Hendrickx	921	2016/2017 season (100%)	446	0	0	250	225
24	ITA	Roberta Rodeghiero	916	2016/2017 season (100%)	362	191	0	219	144
25	SVK	Nicole Rajicová	907	2016/2017 season (100%)	496	213	0	198	0
26	JPN	Marin Honda	900	2016/2017 season (100%)	450	225	225	0	0
27	FIN	Emmi Peltonen	885	2016/2017 season (100%)	293	164	0	250	178
28	HUN	Ivett Tóth	877	2016/2017 season (100%)	402	0	0	250	225
29	GER	Nicole Schott	875	2016/2017 season (100%)	325	0	0	300	250
30	RUS	Elena Radionova	872	2016/2017 season (100%)	0	472	400	0	0
31	KOR	Soyoun Park	870	2016/2017 season (100%)	0	262	191	219	198
32	FRA	Maé-Bérénice Méité	861	2016/2017 season (100%)	173	213	0	250	225
33	CAN	Alaine Chartrand	825	2016/2017 season (100%)	293	262	0	270	0
34	KOR	Eunsoo Lim	750	2016/2017 season (100%)	365	203	182	0	0
35	JPN	Yuna Shiraiwa	735	2016/2017 season (100%)	328	225	182	0	0
36	SWE	Anita Östlund	702	2016/2017 season (100%)	141	133	0	225	203
37	CZE	Michaela-Lucie Hanzlikova	700	2016/2017 season (100%)	113	133	108	182	164
38	JPN	Yura Matsuda	699	2016/2017 season (100%)	0	236	213	250	0
39	SWE	Matilda Algotsson	698	2016/2017 season (100%)	237	97	0	182	182
40	RUS	Polina Tsurskaya	694	2016/2017 season (100%)	194	250	250	0	0
41	RUS	Serafima Sakhanovich	661	2016/2017 season (100%)	0	213	0	270	178
42	AUS	Kailani Craine	646	2016/2017 season (100%)	173	0	0	270	203
43	GBR	Natasha McKay	640	2016/2017 season (100%)	140	0	0	250	250
44	KOR	Nahyun Kim	639	2016/2017 season (100%)	0	191	0	270	178
45	USA	Gracie Gold	631	2016/2017 season (100%)	0	262	191	178	0
46	LAT	Angelina Kuchvalska	606	2016/2017 season (100%)	131	0	0	250	225
47	GER	Nathalie Weinzierl	584	2016/2017 season (100%)	156	0	0	225	203
48	SWE	Joshi Helgesson	578	2016/2017 season (100%)	214	0	0	182	182
49	RUS	Anastasiia Gubanova	565	2016/2017 season (100%)	0	315	250	0	0
50	GBR	Kristen Spours	564	2016/2017 season (100%)	114	0	0	225	225
51	GER	Lea Johanna Dastich	562	2016/2017 season (100%)	239	120	0	203	0
52	USA	Bradie Tennell	509	2016/2017 season (100%)	266	0	0	243	0
53	JPN	Mao Asada	506	2016/2017 season (100%)	0	236	0	270	0
54	JPN	Rika Kihira	505	2016/2017 season (100%)	0	255	250	0	0
55	USA	Courtney Hicks	502	2016/2017 season (100%)	0	324	0	178	0
56	ITA	Giada Russo	475	2016/2017 season (100%)	0	0	0	250	225
56	BRA	Isadora Williams	475	2016/2017 season (100%)	0	0	0	250	225
58	ARM	Anastasia Galustyan	467	2016/2017 season (100%)	264	0	0	203	0
59	GER	Lutricia Bock	457	2016/2017 season (100%)	0	133	0	164	160
60	RUS	Elizaveta Nugumanova	455	2016/2017 season (100%)	0	230	225	0	0
61	ESP	Valentina Matos	451	2016/2017 season (100%)	44	0	0	225	182
62	RUS	Alexandra Avstriyskaya	441	2016/2017 season (100%)	0	0	0	243	198
63	AUT	Natalie Klotz	432	2016/2017 season (100%)	0	0	0	250	182
64	ITA	Micol Cristini	428	2016/2017 season (100%)	0	0	0	225	203
65	RUS	Alena Leonova	425	2016/2017 season (100%)	0	0	0	243	182
66	USA	Amber Glenn	417	2016/2017 season (100%)	0	0	0	219	198
67	SLO	Dasa Grm	406	2016/2017 season (100%)	0	0	0	203	203
67	JPN	Mako Yamashita	406	2016/2017 season (100%)	0	203	203	0	0
69	HUN	Fruzsina Medgyesi	404	2016/2017 season (100%)	0	120	120	164	0
70	NOR	Anne Line Gjersem	402	2016/2017 season (100%)	74	0	0	164	164
71	ITA	Guia Maria Tagliapietra	389	2016/2017 season (100%)	0	0	0	225	164
72	JPN	Rin Nitaya	385	2016/2017 season (100%)	0	203	182	0	0
73	RUS	Alisa Lozko	367	2016/2017 season (100%)	0	203	164	0	0
74	CAN	Sarah Tamura	361	2016/2017 season (100%)	93	148	120	0	0
75	TPE	Amy Lin	359	2016/2017 season (100%)	156	0	0	203	0
76	UKR	Anna Khnychenkova	352	2016/2017 season (100%)	102	0	0	250	0
77	JPN	Yuna Aoki	346	2016/2017 season (100%)	0	182	164	0	0
77	CZE	Eliška Brezinová	346	2016/2017 season (100%)	0	0	0	182	164
77	SRB	Antonina Dubinina	346	2016/2017 season (100%)	0	0	0	182	164
77	KOR	Ye Lim Kim	346	2016/2017 season (100%)	0	182	164	0	0
77	GBR	Katie Powell	346	2016/2017 season (100%)	0	0	0	182	164
82	AUT	Kerstin Frank	317	2016/2017 season (100%)	92	0	0	225	0
83	KOR	Hanul Kim	312	2016/2017 season (100%)	0	164	148	0	0
83	HKG	Yi Christy Leung	312	2016/2017 season (100%)	215	97	0	0	0
85	CHN	Xiangning Li	305	2016/2017 season (100%)	305	0	0	0	0
86	FRA	Julie Froetscher	281	2016/2017 season (100%)	0	148	133	0	0
87	SGP	Chloe Ing	277	2016/2017 season (100%)	113	0	0	164	0
88	RUS	Yulia Lipnitskaya	270	2016/2017 season (100%)	0	0	0	270	0
89	SGP	Shuran Yu	266	2016/2017 season (100%)	102	0	0	164	0
90	SWE	Isabelle Olsson	250	2016/2017 season (100%)	0	0	0	250	0
90	USA	Angela Wang	250	2016/2017 season (100%)	0	0	0	250	0
92	KOR	Yu Jin Choi	225	2016/2017 season (100%)	0	0	0	225	0
92	RUS	Evgenia Ivankova	225	2016/2017 season (100%)	0	0	0	225	0
92	USA	Caroline Zhang	225	2016/2017 season (100%)	0	0	0	225	0
95	JPN	Miyu Nakashio	219	2016/2017 season (100%)	0	0	0	219	0
96	KAZ	Aiza Mambekova	217	2016/2017 season (100%)	0	120	97	0	0
97	FIN	Joanna Kallela	216	2016/2017 season (100%)	0	108	108	0	0
98	AUS	Brooklee Han	214	2016/2017 season (100%)	214	0	0	0	0
99	CAN	Larkyn Austman	203	2016/2017 season (100%)	0	0	0	203	0
99	RSA	Michaela Du Toit	203	2016/2017 season (100%)	0	0	0	203	0
99	KOR	Sena Kim	203	2016/2017 season (100%)	0	0	0	203	0
99	ITA	Elisabetta Leccardi	203	2016/2017 season (100%)	83	120	0	0	0
99	GBR	Anna Litvinenko	203	2016/2017 season (100%)	0	0	0	203	0
99	GBR	Karly Robertson	203	2016/2017 season (100%)	0	0	0	203	0
99	AUT	Lara Roth	203	2016/2017 season (100%)	0	0	0	203	0
99	ROU	Julia Sauter	203	2016/2017 season (100%)	0	0	0	203	0
107	JPN	Mariko Kihara	198	2016/2017 season (100%)	0	0	0	198	0
107	RUS	Natalia Ogoreltseva	198	2016/2017 season (100%)	0	0	0	198	0
107	USA	Paige Rydberg	198	2016/2017 season (100%)	0	0	0	198	0
110	EST	Helery Hälvin	192	2016/2017 season (100%)	192	0	0	0	0
110	CHN	Ziquan Zhao	192	2016/2017 season (100%)	192	0	0	0	0
112	MEX	Andrea Montesinos Cantu	183	2016/2017 season (100%)	75	108	0	0	0
113	KOR	Seo Young Lee	182	2016/2017 season (100%)	0	0	0	182	0
113	EST	Gerli Liinamäe	182	2016/2017 season (100%)	0	0	0	182	0
113	PHI	Alisson Krystle Perticheto	182	2016/2017 season (100%)	0	0	0	182	0
113	SWE	Natasja Remstedt	182	2016/2017 season (100%)	0	0	0	182	0
113	FIN	Jenni Saarinen	182	2016/2017 season (100%)	0	0	0	182	0
113	RUS	Sofia Samodurova	182	2016/2017 season (100%)	0	182	0	0	0
119	USA	Emily Chan	178	2016/2017 season (100%)	0	0	0	178	0
119	JPN	Kanako Murakami	178	2016/2017 season (100%)	0	0	0	178	0
121	RUS	Mariia Bessonova	164	2016/2017 season (100%)	0	0	0	164	0
121	GER	Maria-Katharina Herceg	164	2016/2017 season (100%)	0	0	0	164	0
121	USA	Tessa Hong	164	2016/2017 season (100%)	0	164	0	0	0
121	JPN	Kokoro Iwamoto	164	2016/2017 season (100%)	0	164	0	0	0
121	AUT	Anita Kapferer	164	2016/2017 season (100%)	0	0	0	164	0
121	KOR	Hae Jin Kim	164	2016/2017 season (100%)	0	0	0	164	0
121	ESP	Sonia Lafuente	164	2016/2017 season (100%)	0	0	0	164	0
121	ITA	Ilaria Nogaro	164	2016/2017 season (100%)	0	0	0	164	0
129	KOR	Ji Hyun Byun	160	2016/2017 season (100%)	0	0	0	160	0
130	USA	Starr Andrews	157	2016/2017 season (100%)	157	0	0	0	0
131	RUS	Alisa Fedichkina	148	2016/2017 season (100%)	0	148	0	0	0
131	USA	Ashley Lin	148	2016/2017 season (100%)	0	148	0	0	0
131	USA	Alexia Paganini	148	2016/2017 season (100%)	0	148	0	0	0
131	USA	Megan Wessenberg	148	2016/2017 season (100%)	0	148	0	0	0
135	ISR	Aimee Buchanan	144	2016/2017 season (100%)	0	0	0	144	0
135	USA	Franchesca Chiera	144	2016/2017 season (100%)	0	0	0	144	0
137	HKG	Maisy Hiu Ching Ma	140	2016/2017 season (100%)	140	0	0	0	0
138	GER	Annika Hocke	133	2016/2017 season (100%)	0	133	0	0	0
138	LAT	Diana Nikitina	133	2016/2017 season (100%)	0	133	0	0	0
138	USA	Gabrielle Noullet	133	2016/2017 season (100%)	0	133	0	0	0
141	FIN	Viveca Lindfors	127	2016/2017 season (100%)	127	0	0	0	0
142	KOR	Suh Hyun Son	126	2016/2017 season (100%)	126	0	0	0	0
143	USA	Brynne McIsaac	120	2016/2017 season (100%)	0	120	0	0	0
144	BUL	Alexandra Feigin	108	2016/2017 season (100%)	0	108	0	0	0
144	CAN	Olivia Gran	108	2016/2017 season (100%)	0	108	0	0	0
144	USA	Nina Ouellette	108	2016/2017 season (100%)	0	108	0	0	0
147	CAN	Emily Bausback	97	2016/2017 season (100%)	0	97	0	0	0
147	FRA	Alizee Crozet	97	2016/2017 season (100%)	0	97	0	0	0
147	CAN	Alicia Pineault	97	2016/2017 season (100%)	0	97	0	0	0
147	AUT	Sophia Schaller	97	2016/2017 season (100%)	0	97	0	0	0
151	KOR	So Hyun An	68	2016/2017 season (100%)	68	0	0	0	0
152	TUR	Guzide Irmak Bayir	55	2016/2017 season (100%)	55	0	0	0	0
153	AUS	Holly Harris	49	2016/2017 season (100%)	49	0	0	0	0

=== Pairs (84 couples) ===
As of 30 March 2017

Rank	Nation	Couple	Points	Season	ISU Championships or Olympics	(Junior) Grand Prix and Final		Selected International Competition	
Rank	Nation	Couple	Points	Season	Best	Best	2nd Best	Best	2nd Best
1	RUS	Evgenia Tarasova / Vladimir Morozov	2432	2016/2017 season (100%)	972	800	360	300	0
2	GER	Aliona Savchenko / Bruno Massot	2180	2016/2017 season (100%)	1080	400	400	300	0
3	CAN	Meagan Duhamel / Eric Radford	2104	2016/2017 season (100%)	756	648	400	300	0
4	CHN	Xiaoyu Yu / Hao Zhang	1995	2016/2017 season (100%)	875	720	400	0	0
5	RUS	Natalia Zabiiako / Alexander Enbert	1737	2016/2017 season (100%)	551	583	360	243	0
6	CAN	Julianne Séguin / Charlie Bilodeau	1643	2016/2017 season (100%)	418	525	400	300	0
7	CAN	Liubov Ilyushechkina / Dylan Moscovitch	1627	2016/2017 season (100%)	709	324	324	270	0
8	ITA	Valentina Marchei / Ondrej Hotárek	1570	2016/2017 season (100%)	517	292	191	300	270
9	FRA	Vanessa James / Morgan Ciprès	1566	2016/2017 season (100%)	680	324	292	270	0
10	ITA	Nicole Della Monica / Matteo Guarise	1500	2016/2017 season (100%)	402	262	236	300	300
11	USA	Haven Denney / Brandon Frazier	1492	2016/2017 season (100%)	402	360	292	219	219
12	CHN	Cheng Peng / Yang Jin	1383	2016/2017 season (100%)	551	472	360	0	0
13	AUT	Miriam Ziegler / Severin Kiefer	1309	2016/2017 season (100%)	362	236	236	250	225
14	CZE	Anna Dušková / Martin Bidař	1261	2016/2017 season (100%)	446	315	250	250	0
15	CHN	Wenjing Sui / Cong Han	1200	2016/2017 season (100%)	1200	0	0	0	0
16	RUS	Kristina Astakhova / Alexei Rogonov	1126	2016/2017 season (100%)	0	324	262	270	270
17	RUS	Alina Ustimkina / Nikita Volodin	1075	2016/2017 season (100%)	295	255	225	300	0
18	JPN	Sumire Suto / Francis Boudreau-Audet	1007	2016/2017 season (100%)	325	213	0	250	219
19	AUS	Ekaterina Alexandrovskaya / Harley Windsor	980	2016/2017 season (100%)	500	250	230	0	0
20	GER	Mari Vartmann / Ruben Blommaert	961	2016/2017 season (100%)	0	262	213	243	243
21	RUS	Aleksandra Boikova / Dmitrii Kozlovskii	959	2016/2017 season (100%)	450	284	225	0	0
22	USA	Chelsea Liu / Brian Johnson	903	2016/2017 season (100%)	266	203	164	270	0
23	USA	Ashley Cain / Timothy Leduc	824	2016/2017 season (100%)	362	0	0	243	219
24	RUS	Amina Atakhanova / Ilia Spiridonov	797	2016/2017 season (100%)	365	225	207	0	0
25	RUS	Ksenia Stolbova / Fedor Klimov	787	2016/2017 season (100%)	787	0	0	0	0
26	RUS	Yuko Kavaguti / Alexander Smirnov	768	2016/2017 season (100%)	0	262	236	270	0
27	ITA	Rebecca Ghilardi / Filippo Ambrosini	739	2016/2017 season (100%)	293	0	0	243	203
28	CHN	Yumeng Gao / Zhong Xie	733	2016/2017 season (100%)	405	164	164	0	0
29	USA	Tarah Kayne / Danny O'Shea	726	2016/2017 season (100%)	0	292	236	198	0
30	USA	Marissa Castelli / Mervin Tran	718	2016/2017 season (100%)	0	262	213	243	0
31	GER	Minerva Fabienne Hase / Nolan Seegert	710	2016/2017 season (100%)	264	0	0	243	203
32	RUS	Alisa Efimova / Alexander Korovin	708	2016/2017 season (100%)	0	213	0	270	225
33	LTU	Goda Butkutė / Nikita Ermolaev	637	2016/2017 season (100%)	0	191	0	243	203
34	CHN	Xuehan Wang / Lei Wang	616	2016/2017 season (100%)	0	324	292	0	0
35	KOR	Su Yeon Kim / Hyungtae Kim	609	2016/2017 season (100%)	264	120	0	225	0
35	CRO	Lana Petranovic / Antonio Souza-Kordeiru	609	2016/2017 season (100%)	192	0	0	219	198
37	RUS	Anastasia Mishina / Vladislav Mirzoev	600	2016/2017 season (100%)	0	350	250	0	0
38	CAN	Lori-Ann Matte / Thierry Ferland	545	2016/2017 season (100%)	215	182	148	0	0
39	PRK	Tae Ok Ryom / Ju Sik Kim	525	2016/2017 season (100%)	275	0	0	250	0
40	CAN	Brittany Jones / Joshua Reagan	513	2016/2017 season (100%)	0	213	0	300	0
41	USA	Alexa Scimeca Knierim / Chris Knierim	496	2016/2017 season (100%)	496	0	0	0	0
42	CAN	Evelyn Walsh / Trennt Michaud	492	2016/2017 season (100%)	328	164	0	0	0
43	CAN	Camille Ruest / Andrew Wolfe	455	2016/2017 season (100%)	0	236	0	219	0
44	CAN	Kirsten Moore-Towers / Michael Marinaro	446	2016/2017 season (100%)	446	0	0	0	0
45	JPN	Miu Suzaki / Ryuichi Kihara	440	2016/2017 season (100%)	237	0	0	203	0
46	USA	Jessica Pfund / Joshua Santillan	410	2016/2017 season (100%)	0	191	0	219	0
47	RUS	Ekaterina Borisova / Dmitry Sopot	406	2016/2017 season (100%)	0	203	203	0	0
48	FRA	Lola Esbrat / Andrei Novoselov	401	2016/2017 season (100%)	237	0	0	164	0
49	KOR	Kyueun Kim / Alex Kang Chan Kam	390	2016/2017 season (100%)	192	0	0	198	0
50	GBR	Zoe Jones / Christopher Boyadji	378	2016/2017 season (100%)	214	0	0	164	0
51	ISR	Arina Cherniavskaia / Evgeni Krasnopolski	371	2016/2017 season (100%)	173	0	0	198	0
52	AUS	Paris Stephens / Matthew Dodds	362	2016/2017 season (100%)	0	0	0	198	164
53	USA	Nica Digerness / Danny Neudecker	342	2016/2017 season (100%)	194	148	0	0	0
54	BLR	Tatiana Danilova / Mikalai Kamianchuk	325	2016/2017 season (100%)	325	0	0	0	0
55	ISR	Hailey Esther Kops / Artem Tsoglin	282	2016/2017 season (100%)	174	108	0	0	0
56	USA	Jessica Calalang / Zack Sidhu	270	2016/2017 season (100%)	0	0	0	270	0
57	CHN	Yue Han / Yongchao Yang	253	2016/2017 season (100%)	0	133	120	0	0
58	SUI	Ioulia Chtchetinina / Noah Scherer	250	2016/2017 season (100%)	0	0	0	250	0
59	UKR	Renata Oganesian / Mark Bardei	245	2016/2017 season (100%)	0	148	97	0	0
60	USA	Alexandria Shaugnessy / James Morgan	243	2016/2017 season (100%)	0	0	0	243	0
61	JPN	Ami Koga / Spencer Akira Howe	228	2016/2017 season (100%)	0	120	108	0	0
62	SUI	Alexandra Herbrikova / Nicolas Roulet	225	2016/2017 season (100%)	0	0	0	225	0
62	PRK	So Hyang Pak / Nam I Song	225	2016/2017 season (100%)	0	0	0	225	0
64	FRA	Camille Mendoza / Pavel Kovalev	219	2016/2017 season (100%)	0	0	0	219	0
65	KOR	Minji Ji / Themistocles Leftheris	214	2016/2017 season (100%)	214	0	0	0	0
66	HUN	Daria Beklemisheva / Márk Magyar	203	2016/2017 season (100%)	0	0	0	203	0
67	USA	Erika Smith / Aj Reiss	198	2016/2017 season (100%)	0	0	0	198	0
68	RUS	Bogdana Lukashevich / Alexander Stepanov	182	2016/2017 season (100%)	0	0	0	182	0
68	RUS	Anastasia Poluianova / Maksim Selkin	182	2016/2017 season (100%)	0	182	0	0	0
68	JPN	Marin Ono / Wesley Killing	182	2016/2017 season (100%)	0	0	0	182	0
68	FIN	Emilia Simonen / Matthew Penasse	182	2016/2017 season (100%)	0	0	0	182	0
72	TUR	Cagla Demirsal / Berk Akalin	164	2016/2017 season (100%)	0	0	0	164	0
73	GER	Talisa Thomalla / Robert Kunkel	157	2016/2017 season (100%)	157	0	0	0	0
74	CAN	Justine Brasseur / Mathieu Ostiguy	148	2016/2017 season (100%)	0	148	0	0	0
75	JPN	Riku Miura / Shoya Ichihashi	141	2016/2017 season (100%)	141	0	0	0	0
76	USA	Sarah Rose / Joseph Goodpaster	133	2016/2017 season (100%)	0	133	0	0	0
76	RUS	Kseniia Akhanteva / Valerii Kolesov	133	2016/2017 season (100%)	0	133	0	0	0
76	USA	Gabriella Marvaldi / Daniel Villeneuve	133	2016/2017 season (100%)	0	133	0	0	0
79	FRA	Cleo Hamon / Denys Strekalin	127	2016/2017 season (100%)	127	0	0	0	0
80	ITA	Irma Caldara / Edoardo Caputo	114	2016/2017 season (100%)	114	0	0	0	0
81	ITA	Giulia Foresti / Leo Luca Sforza	108	2016/2017 season (100%)	0	108	0	0	0
81	CAN	Hannah Dawson / Christian Reekie	108	2016/2017 season (100%)	0	108	0	0	0
83	ESP	Alexanne Bouillon / Ton Consul	103	2016/2017 season (100%)	103	0	0	0	0
84	CAN	Jamie Knoblauch / Cody Wong	97	2016/2017 season (100%)	0	97	0	0	0

=== Ice dance (108 couples) ===
As of 1 April 2017

Rank	Nation	Couple	Points	Season	ISU Championships or Olympics	(Junior) Grand Prix and Final		Selected International Competition	
Rank	Nation	Couple	Points	Season	Best	Best	2nd Best	Best	2nd Best
1	CAN	Tessa Virtue / Scott Moir	2700	2016/2017 season (100%)	1200	800	400	300	0
2	RUS	Ekaterina Bobrova / Dmitri Soloviev	2370	2016/2017 season (100%)	787	583	400	300	300
3	FRA	Gabriella Papadakis / Guillaume Cizeron	2200	2016/2017 season (100%)	1080	720	400	0	0
4	USA	Madison Hubbell / Zachary Donohue	2067	2016/2017 season (100%)	612	525	360	300	270
5	USA	Madison Chock / Evan Bates	2052	2016/2017 season (100%)	680	472	360	270	270
6	USA	Maia Shibutani / Alex Shibutani	2020	2016/2017 season (100%)	972	648	400	0	0
7	ITA	Anna Cappellini / Luca Lanotte	1922	2016/2017 season (100%)	756	324	292	300	250
8	ITA	Charlene Guignard / Marco Fabbri	1680	2016/2017 season (100%)	496	292	292	300	300
9	ISR	Isabella Tobias / Ilia Tkachenko	1599	2016/2017 season (100%)	612	262	236	270	219
10	CAN	Kaitlyn Weaver / Andrew Poje	1559	2016/2017 season (100%)	875	360	324	0	0
11	CAN	Piper Gilles / Paul Poirier	1465	2016/2017 season (100%)	574	324	324	243	0
12	RUS	Alexandra Stepanova / Ivan Bukin	1437	2016/2017 season (100%)	551	324	262	300	0
13	POL	Natalia Kaliszek / Maksym Spodyriev	1346	2016/2017 season (100%)	402	262	213	250	219
14	DEN	Laurence Fournier Beaudry / Nikolaj Sørensen	1334	2016/2017 season (100%)	446	213	213	243	219
15	FRA	Marie-Jade Lauriault / Romain Le Gac	1184	2016/2017 season (100%)	264	236	236	250	198
16	USA	Rachel Parsons / Michael Parsons	1100	2016/2017 season (100%)	500	350	250	0	0
17	USA	Kaitlin Hawayek / Jean-Luc Baker	1068	2016/2017 season (100%)	0	292	236	270	270
18	UKR	Alexandra Nazarova / Maxim Nikitin	1028	2016/2017 season (100%)	362	213	0	250	203
19	JPN	Kana Muramoto / Chris Reed	1026	2016/2017 season (100%)	362	191	0	270	203
20	RUS	Alla Loboda / Pavel Drozd	1015	2016/2017 season (100%)	450	315	250	0	0
21	TUR	Alisa Agafonova / Alper Uçar	952	2016/2017 season (100%)	293	191	0	243	225
22	USA	Elliana Pogrebinsky / Alex Benoit	942	2016/2017 season (100%)	0	236	213	250	243
23	USA	Christina Carreira / Anthony Ponomarenko	885	2016/2017 season (100%)	405	255	225	0	0
24	RUS	Victoria Sinitsina / Nikita Katsalapov	879	2016/2017 season (100%)	325	292	262	0	0
25	RUS	Elena Ilinykh / Ruslan Zhiganshin	854	2016/2017 season (100%)	0	292	262	300	0
26	RUS	Anastasia Shpilevaya / Grigory Smirnov	815	2016/2017 season (100%)	365	225	225	0	0
27	KOR	Yura Min / Alexander Gamelin	803	2016/2017 season (100%)	402	0	0	203	198
28	USA	Lorraine McNamara / Quinn Carpenter	800	2016/2017 season (100%)	266	284	250	0	0
29	RUS	Tiffani Zagorski / Jonathan Guerreiro	775	2016/2017 season (100%)	0	262	0	270	243
30	RUS	Anastasia Skoptcova / Kirill Aleshin	756	2016/2017 season (100%)	328	225	203	0	0
31	FRA	Angelique Abachkina / Louis Thauron	719	2016/2017 season (100%)	239	250	230	0	0
32	ESP	Sara Hurtado / Kirill Khaliavin	712	2016/2017 season (100%)	237	0	0	250	225
33	GBR	Lilah Fear / Lewis Gibson	687	2016/2017 season (100%)	192	0	0	270	225
34	CHN	Shiyue Wang / Xinyu Liu	682	2016/2017 season (100%)	446	236	0	0	0
35	ESP	Olivia Smart / Adria Diaz	675	2016/2017 season (100%)	200	0	0	250	225
36	SVK	Lucie Myslivecková / Lukáš Csölley	666	2016/2017 season (100%)	173	0	0	250	243
37	GER	Kavita Lorenz / Joti Polizoakis	664	2016/2017 season (100%)	214	0	0	225	225
38	CAN	Marjorie Lajoie / Zachary Lagha	659	2016/2017 season (100%)	295	182	182	0	0
39	CZE	Nicole Kuzmichova / Alexandr Sinicyn	622	2016/2017 season (100%)	215	225	182	0	0
40	FIN	Cecilia Törn / Jussiville Partanen	581	2016/2017 season (100%)	156	0	0	243	182
41	CZE	Cortney Mansour / Michal Ceska	572	2016/2017 season (100%)	0	191	0	203	178
42	FRA	Natacha Lagouge / Corentin Rahier	504	2016/2017 season (100%)	174	182	148	0	0
43	CHN	Linshu Song / Zhuoming Sun	484	2016/2017 season (100%)	293	191	0	0	0
44	GER	Katharina Müller / Tim Dieck	475	2016/2017 season (100%)	0	0	0	250	225
45	GER	Ria Schwendinger / Valentin Wunderlich	447	2016/2017 season (100%)	194	133	120	0	0
46	CAN	Alexandra Paul / Mitchell Islam	434	2016/2017 season (100%)	0	191	0	243	0
47	RUS	Sofia Polishchuk / Alexander Vakhnov	428	2016/2017 season (100%)	0	225	203	0	0
48	HUN	Hanna Jakucs / Daniel Illes	426	2016/2017 season (100%)	68	97	97	164	0
49	CAN	Ashlynne Stairs / Lee Royer	424	2016/2017 season (100%)	127	164	133	0	0
50	UKR	Darya Popova / Volodymyr Byelikov	410	2016/2017 season (100%)	157	133	120	0	0
51	RUS	Arina Ushakova / Maxim Nekrasov	406	2016/2017 season (100%)	0	203	203	0	0
52	USA	Anastasia Cannuscio / Colin McManus	404	2016/2017 season (100%)	0	213	191	0	0
53	ITA	Jasmine Tessari / Francesco Fioretti	401	2016/2017 season (100%)	0	0	0	203	198
53	POL	Justyna Plutowska / Jeremie Flemin	401	2016/2017 season (100%)	0	0	0	219	182
55	JPN	Rikako Fukase / Aru Tateno	386	2016/2017 season (100%)	141	148	97	0	0
56	AZE	Vavara Ogloblina / Mikhail Zhirnov	385	2016/2017 season (100%)	0	0	0	203	182
57	USA	Julia Biechler / Damian Dodge	383	2016/2017 season (100%)	0	0	0	219	164
58	RUS	Sofia Shevchenko / Igor Eremenko	367	2016/2017 season (100%)	0	203	164	0	0
59	LAT	Olga Jakushina / Andrey Nevskiy	360	2016/2017 season (100%)	0	0	0	182	178
60	USA	Chloe Lewis / Logan Bye	351	2016/2017 season (100%)	0	203	148	0	0
61	FRA	Julia Wagret / Mathieu Couyras	346	2016/2017 season (100%)	0	182	164	0	0
62	CAN	Alicia Fabbri / Claudio Pietrantonio	330	2016/2017 season (100%)	0	182	148	0	0
63	CAN	Hannah Whitley / Elliott Graham	328	2016/2017 season (100%)	0	164	164	0	0
64	CHN	Hong Chen / Yan Zhao	325	2016/2017 season (100%)	325	0	0	0	0
65	ARM	Tina Garabedian / Simon Proulx-Senecal	324	2016/2017 season (100%)	126	0	0	198	0
66	UKR	Maria Golubtsova / Kirill Belobrov	312	2016/2017 season (100%)	0	164	148	0	0
67	LTU	Taylor Tran / Saulius Ambrulevičius	304	2016/2017 season (100%)	140	0	0	164	0
68	AUS	Matilda Friend / William Badaoui	289	2016/2017 season (100%)	192	97	0	0	0
69	FRA	Sarah Marine Rouffanche / Geoffrey Brissaud	281	2016/2017 season (100%)	0	148	133	0	0
70	BLR	Viktoria Kavaliova / Yurii Bieliaiev	277	2016/2017 season (100%)	113	0	0	164	0
71	JPN	Emi Hirai / Marien De La Asuncion	264	2016/2017 season (100%)	264	0	0	0	0
72	KOR	Hojung Lee / Richard Kang In Kam	237	2016/2017 season (100%)	237	0	0	0	0
73	GBR	Leticia Marsh / Anton Spiridonov	228	2016/2017 season (100%)	0	120	108	0	0
73	EST	Viktoria Semenjuk / Artur Gruzdev	228	2016/2017 season (100%)	0	120	108	0	0
75	AUS	Adele Morrison / Demid Rokachev	214	2016/2017 season (100%)	214	0	0	0	0
76	BLR	Kristsina Kaunatskaia / Yuri Hulitski	205	2016/2017 season (100%)	0	108	97	0	0
77	RUS	Sofia Evdokimova / Egor Bazin	203	2016/2017 season (100%)	0	0	0	203	0
77	SUI	Victoria Manni / Carlo Röthlisberger	203	2016/2017 season (100%)	0	0	0	203	0
79	BLR	Emilia Kalehanava / Uladzislau Palkhouski	200	2016/2017 season (100%)	103	97	0	0	0
80	RUS	Betina Popova / Sergey Mozgov	198	2016/2017 season (100%)	0	0	0	198	0
80	USA	Karina Manta / Joseph Johnson	198	2016/2017 season (100%)	0	0	0	198	0
82	RUS	Evgeniia Lopareva / Alexey Karpushov	182	2016/2017 season (100%)	0	182	0	0	0
82	CAN	Mackenzie Bent / Dmitre Razgulajevs	182	2016/2017 season (100%)	0	0	0	182	0
82	GER	Shari Koch / Christian Nüchtern	182	2016/2017 season (100%)	0	0	0	182	0
82	GEO	Tatiana Kozmava / Alexei Shumski	182	2016/2017 season (100%)	0	0	0	182	0
86	USA	Charlotte Maxwell / Ryan Devereaux	178	2016/2017 season (100%)	0	0	0	178	0
87	AUS	Kimberley Hew-Low / Timothy McKernan	173	2016/2017 season (100%)	173	0	0	0	0
88	ISR	Adel Tankova / Ronald Zilberberg	164	2016/2017 season (100%)	0	0	0	164	0
88	FRA	Adelina Galayavieva / Laurent Abecassis	164	2016/2017 season (100%)	0	0	0	164	0
88	ESP	Celia Robledo / Luis Fenero	164	2016/2017 season (100%)	0	0	0	164	0
88	FRA	Lorenza Alessandrini / Pierre Souquet	164	2016/2017 season (100%)	0	0	0	164	0
88	RUS	Polina Ivanenko / Daniil Karpov	164	2016/2017 season (100%)	0	164	0	0	0
93	RUS	Eva Kuts / Dmitrii Mikhailov	148	2016/2017 season (100%)	0	148	0	0	0
94	CAN	Danielle Wu / Nik Mirzakhani	133	2016/2017 season (100%)	0	133	0	0	0
94	USA	Emma Gunter / Caleb Wein	133	2016/2017 season (100%)	0	133	0	0	0
94	FRA	Salome Abdedou / Dylan Antunes	133	2016/2017 season (100%)	0	133	0	0	0
97	EST	Katerina Bunina / German Frolov	120	2016/2017 season (100%)	0	120	0	0	0
97	FRA	Loica Demougeot / Theo Le Mercier	120	2016/2017 season (100%)	0	120	0	0	0
97	CAN	Seungyun Han / Grayson Lochhead	120	2016/2017 season (100%)	0	120	0	0	0
100	GBR	Sasha Fear / Elliot Verburg	114	2016/2017 season (100%)	114	0	0	0	0
101	USA	Eliana Gropman / Ian Somerville	108	2016/2017 season (100%)	0	108	0	0	0
101	POL	Olexandra Borysova / Cezary Zawadzki	108	2016/2017 season (100%)	0	108	0	0	0
101	GER	Sarah Michelle Knispel / Maximilian Voigtländer	108	2016/2017 season (100%)	0	108	0	0	0
101	CHN	Yuzhu Guo / Pengkun Zhao	108	2016/2017 season (100%)	0	108	0	0	0
105	AUT	Elizaveta Orlova / Stephano Valentino Schuster	97	2016/2017 season (100%)	0	97	0	0	0
106	LTU	Guoste Damuleviciute / Deividas Kizala	93	2016/2017 season (100%)	93	0	0	0	0
107	GEO	Eva Khachaturian / Georgy Reviya	83	2016/2017 season (100%)	83	0	0	0	0
108	FIN	Monica Lindfors / Juho Pirinen	75	2016/2017 season (100%)	75	0	0	0	0

== See also ==
- 2016–17 ISU World Standings
- ISU World Standings
- ISU Season's World Ranking
- 2016–17 figure skating season
- 2016–17 synchronized skating season
