= Andréanne Poulin =

Canadian ice dancer (born 1995)

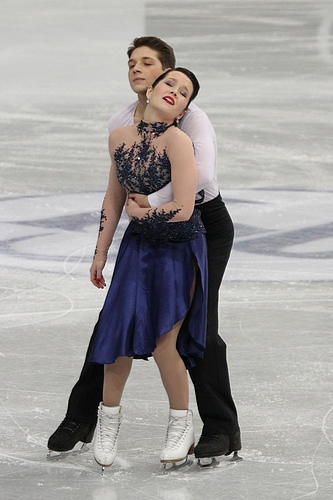
- Poulin and Servant in 2012

Personal information
- Born: April 26, 1995 (age 31) Montreal, Quebec
- Home town: Île Bizard, Quebec
- Height: 1.58 m (5 ft 2 in)

Figure skating career
- Country: Canada
- Partner: Marc-André Servant
- Skating club: Scarboro FSC; Deux-Rives SC
- Began skating: 1998
- Retired: August 4, 2016

Andréanne Poulin (born April 26, 1995) is a Canadian former competitive ice dancer. With partner Marc-André Servant, she is the 2015 Skate Canada Autumn Classic silver medalist and 2012 Canadian national junior champion.

Poulin began skating at age three and ice dancing at eight. Poulin and Servant were coached for a number of years by Shawn Winter and Elise Hamel at the Deux-Rives Figure Skating Club in Pierrefonds, Quebec. In 2015, they moved to train with Carol Lane, Juris Razgulajevs, and Jon Lane at the Scarboro FSC in Ontario. The duo retired from competition on August 4, 2016.

== Programs ==
(with Servant)

Season	Short dance	Free dance
2015–16	Bon Voyage Dans La Lune by Marie-Élaine Thibert; A New Deal (from Ratatouille) by Michael Giacchino	Birth by Alexandre Desplat; Final Soirs D'alsace, Op. 52 by Ensemble Vivant
2014–15	Tormenta de Fuengo; Diablo Rojo by Henry Jackman	Palladio by Karl Jenkins and Adiemus; The Four Seasons by Antonio Vivaldi; Architect of the Mind by Kerry Muzzey
2012–13	Mars vs Venus by Usher; Without You by David Guetta ft. Usher	By Alexandre Desplat: American Empirical Pictures; Mr. Fox in the Fields; Cains Lubus; Whack-Bat Majorette Ensemble
2011–12	(Sittin' On) The Dock of the Bay; Mas que nada	Passion Nomad by Dr. Draw

== Competitive highlights ==
CS: Challenger Series; JGP: Junior Grand Prix

With Servant

International
Event	09–10	10–11	11–12	12–13	14–15	15–16
CS Autumn Classic					8th	
Autumn Classic						2nd
International: Junior
Junior Worlds			20th			
JGP Germany		4th				
JGP Latvia			6th			
JGP Slovenia				3rd		
JGP United States				3rd		
National
Canadian Champ.	5th J	4th J	1st J	6th	8th	6th
J: Junior level
