= Autumn Classic International =

International figure skating competition

- Status: Inactive
- Genre: ISU Challenger Series
- Frequency: Annual
- Country: Canada
- Inaugurated: 2014
- Previous event: 2023 Autumn Classic International
- Organiser: Skate Canada

The Autumn Classic International is an annual figure skating competition sanctioned by the International Skating Union (ISU), organized and hosted by Skate Canada. The competition debuted in 2014 in Barrie, Ontario, as one of the inaugural competitions of the Challenger Series. The Autumn Classic International has been a Challenger Series event six times during its history. Medals were awarded in men's singles, women's singles, pair skating, and ice dance; and when the event was part of the Challenger Series, skaters earned points towards the World Standings and Season's World Ranking based on their results. The event was last held in 2023 in Montreal.

== History ==
The ISU Challenger Series was introduced in 2014. It is a series of international figure skating competitions sanctioned by the International Skating Union and organized by ISU member nations. The objective is to ensure consistent organization and structure within a series of international competitions linked together, providing opportunities for senior-level skaters to compete at the international level and also earn points towards the World Standings and Season's World Ranking. When an event is held as part of the Challenger Series, it must host at least three of the four disciplines (men's singles, women's singles, pair skating, and ice dance) and representatives from at least ten different ISU member nations. The minimum number of entrants required for each discipline is eight skaters each in men's singles and women's singles, five teams in pair skating, and six teams in ice dance. Each ISU member nation is eligible to enter up to three skaters or teams per discipline in each competition, although Skate Canada may enter an unlimited number of entrants in their own event.

The inaugural edition of the Autumn Classic International coincided with the launch of the Challenger Series and was held in Barrie, Ontario. Ross Miner of the United States won the men's event, Gabrielle Daleman of Canada won the women's event, Meagan Duhamel and Eric Radford of Canada won the pairs event, and Gabriella Papadakis and Guillaume Cizeron of France won the ice dance event. The Autumn Classic International was a Challenger Series event in 2014, from 2016 to 2019, in 2021, and in 2023. It was held in Barrie the first two times, then in Montreal in 2016 and 2017, and in Oakville in 2018 and 2019. No competition was held in 2020 due to the COVID-19 pandemic, and the event in 2021 was held without spectators or media present. The most recent two iterations were held in 2021 and 2023, in Montreal.

== Senior medalists ==
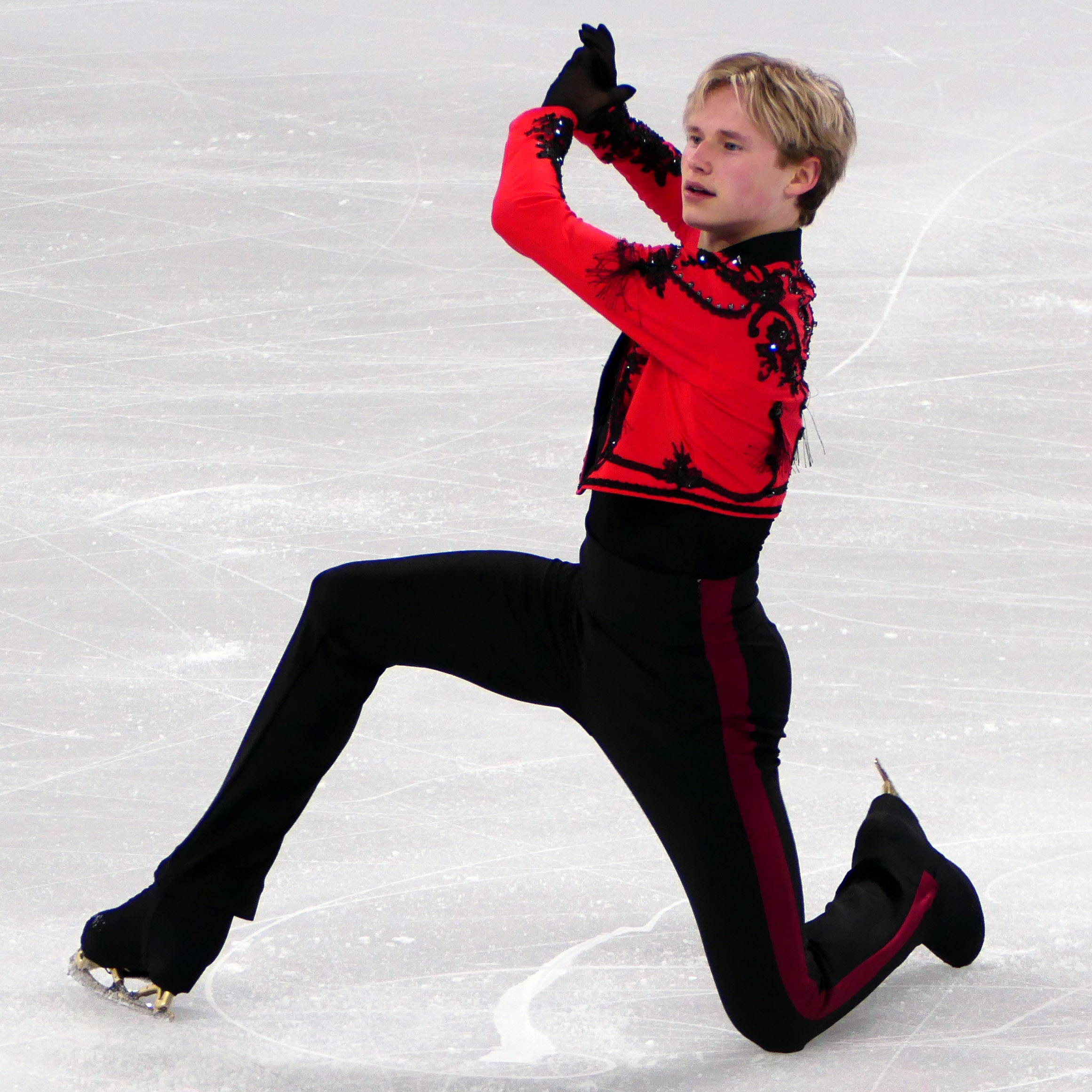
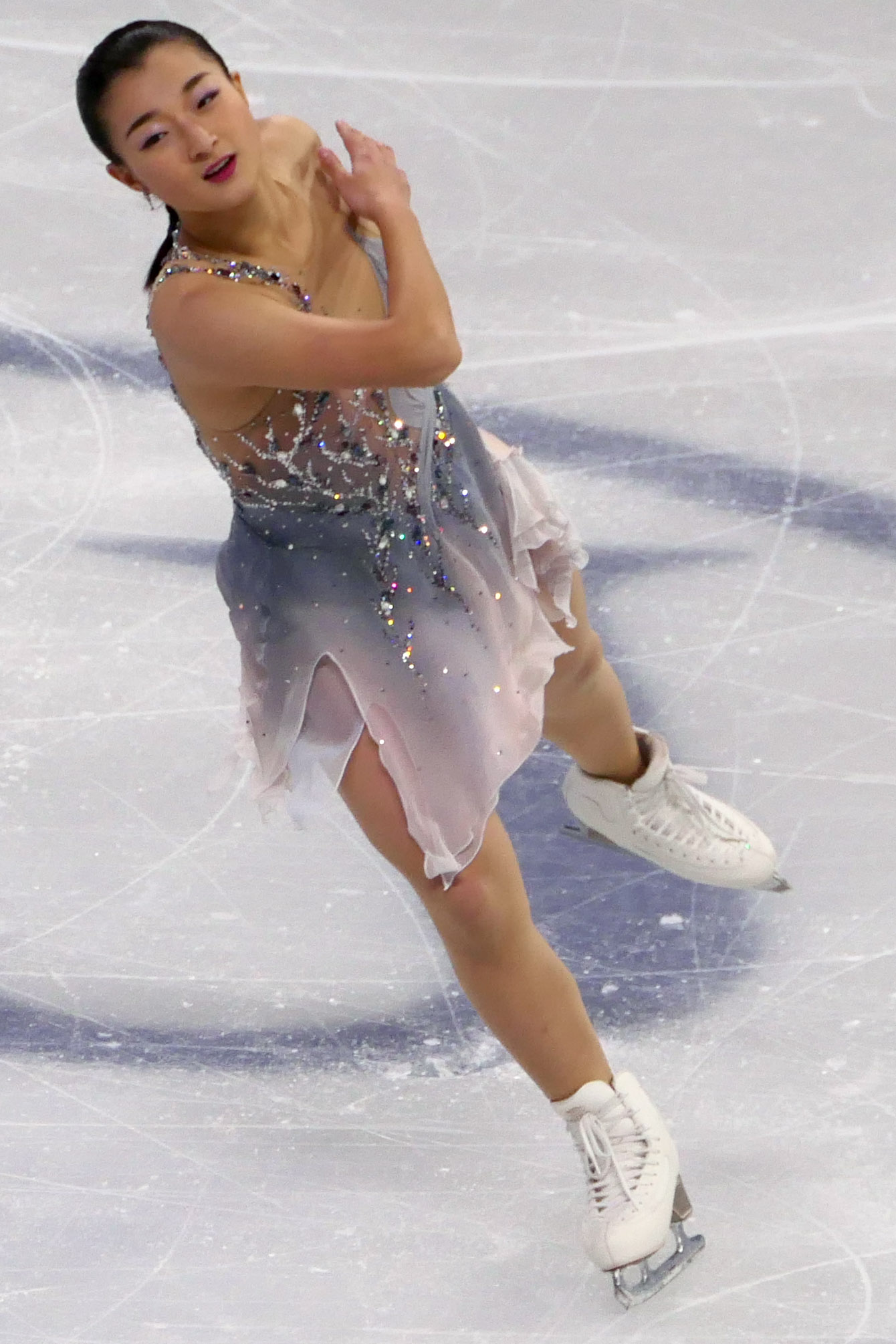
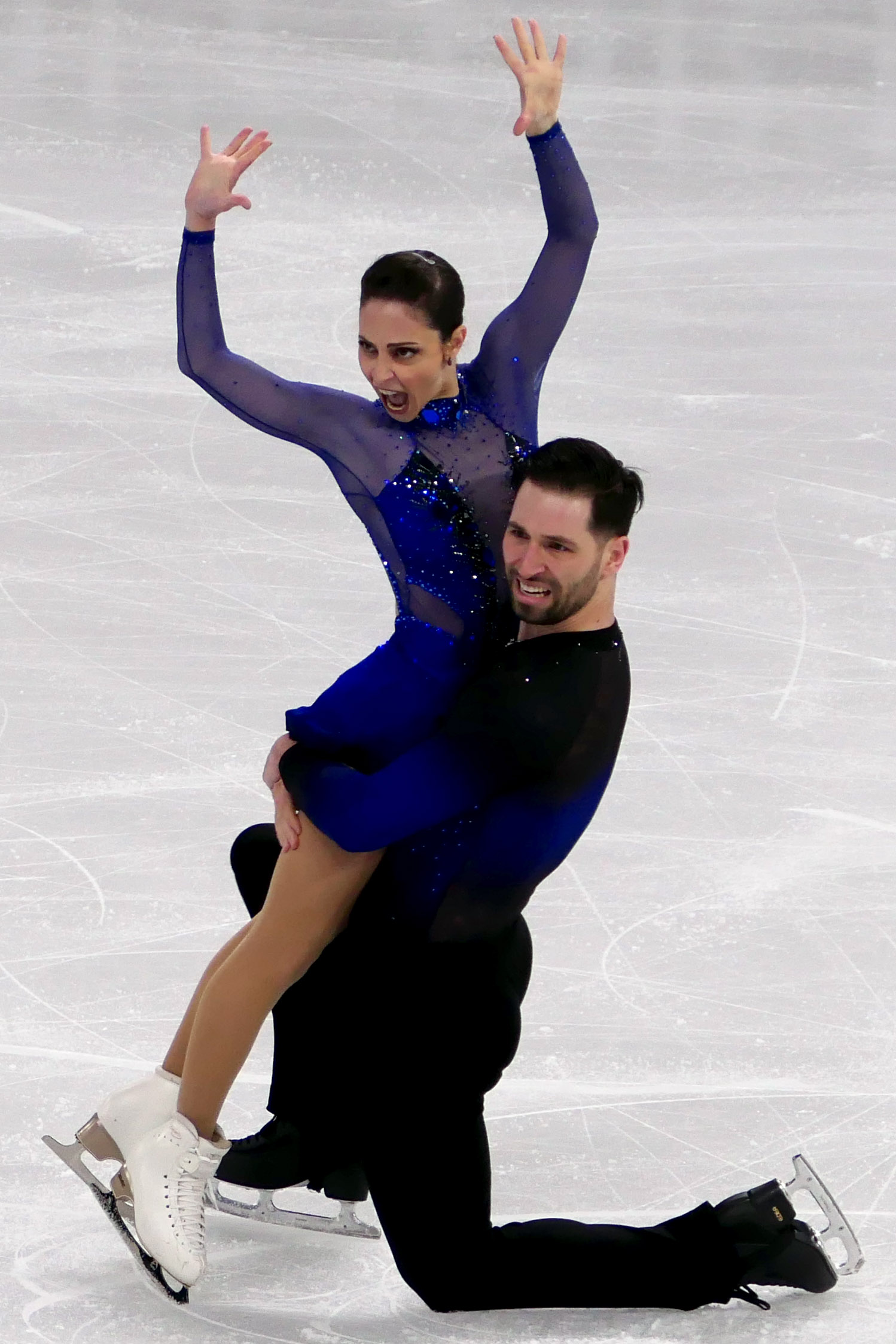
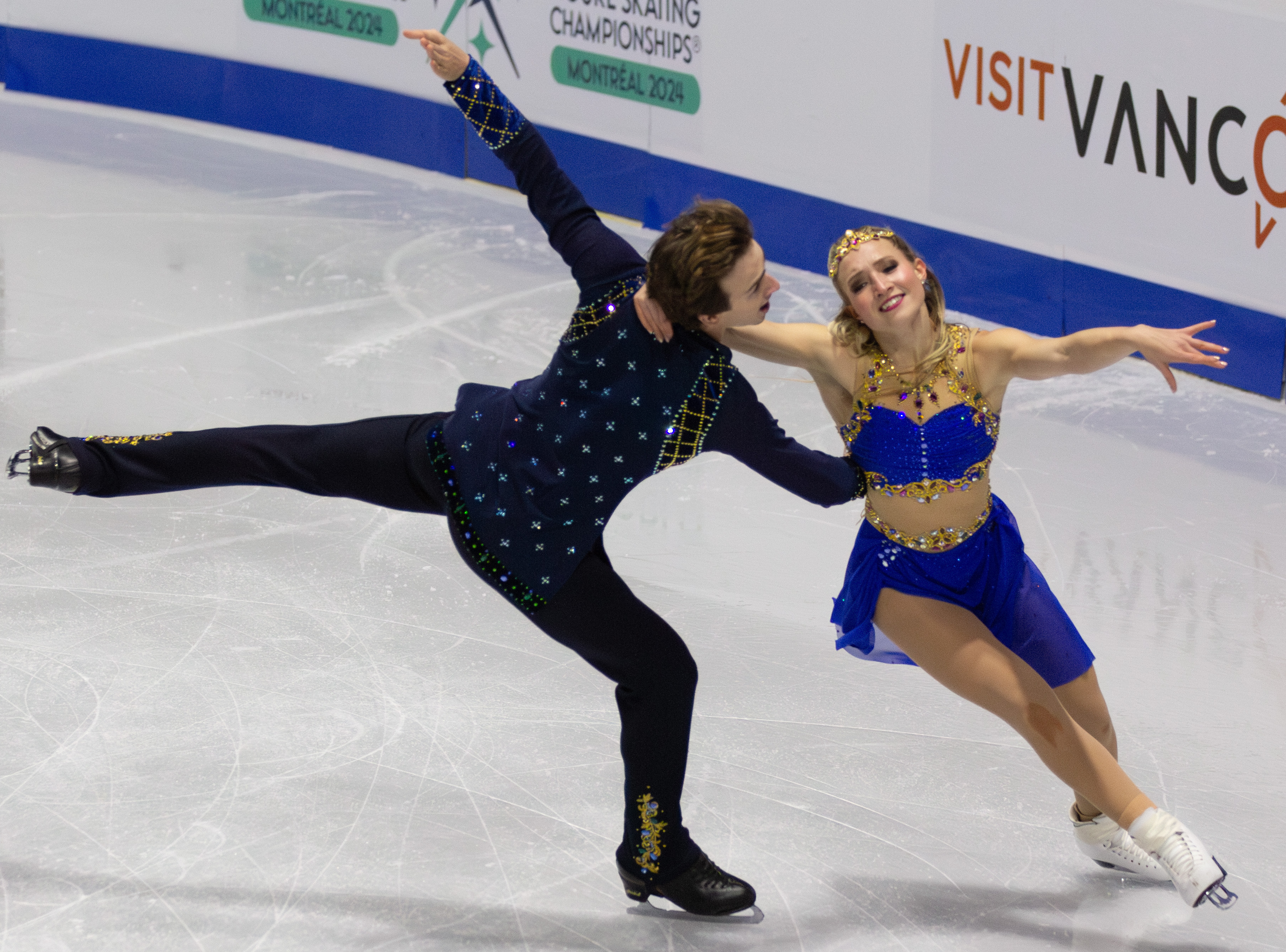
The 2023 Autumn Classic International champions (from left to right): Ilia Malinin of the United States (men's singles); Kaori Sakamoto of Japan (women's singles); Deanna Stellato-Dudek and Maxime Deschamps of Canada (pair skating); and Eva Pate and Logan Bye of the United States (ice dance)

CS: Challenger Series event

=== Men's singles ===
The men's event at the 2021 Autumn Classic International was not part of the Challenger Series competition.

Senior men's event medalists
Year	Location	Gold	Silver	Bronze	Ref.
2014 CS	Barrie	(United States) Ross Miner	(Canada) Nam Nguyen	(Canada) Jeremy Ten	
2015	Barrie	(Japan) Yuzuru Hanyu	(Canada) Nam Nguyen	(United States) Sean Rabbitt	
2016 CS	Montreal	(Japan) Yuzuru Hanyu	(Uzbekistan) Misha Ge	(United States) Max Aaron	
2017 CS	Montreal	(Spain) Javier Fernández	(Japan) Yuzuru Hanyu	(Canada) Keegan Messing	
2018 CS	Oakville	(Japan) Yuzuru Hanyu	(South Korea) Cha Jun-hwan	(Canada) Roman Sadovsky	
2019 CS	Oakville	(Japan) Yuzuru Hanyu	(France) Kévin Aymoz	(Canada) Keegan Messing	
2020	Oakville	Competition cancelled due to the COVID-19 pandemic			
2021	Montreal	(Canada) Conrad Orzel	(Canada) Bennet Toman	(Canada) Beres Clements	
2022	No competition held				
2023 CS	Montreal	(United States) Ilia Malinin	(France) Kévin Aymoz	(Canada) Stephen Gogolev	

=== Women's singles ===
Senior women's event medalists
Year	Location	Gold	Silver	Bronze	Ref.
2014 CS	Barrie	(Canada) Gabrielle Daleman	(United States) Angela Wang	(Canada) Julianne Séguin	
2015	Barrie	(Kazakhstan) Elizabet Tursynbaeva	(Japan) Haruka Imai	(United States) Angela Wang	
2016 CS	Montreal	(United States) Mirai Nagasu	(Canada) Alaine Chartrand	(Kazakhstan) Elizabet Tursynbaeva	
2017 CS	Montreal	(Canada) Kaetlyn Osmond	(Japan) Mai Mihara	(Kazakhstan) Elizabet Tursynbaeva	
2018 CS	Oakville	(United States) Bradie Tennell	(Russia) Evgenia Medvedeva	(France) Maé-Bérénice Méité	
2019 CS	Oakville	(Japan) Rika Kihira	(Russia) Evgenia Medvedeva	(South Korea) Lim Eun-soo	
2020	Oakville	Competition cancelled due to the COVID-19 pandemic			
2021 CS	Montreal	(Cyprus) Marilena Kitromilis	(South Korea) You Young	(South Korea) Ji Seo-yeon	
2022	No competition held				
2023 CS	Montreal	(Japan) Kaori Sakamoto	(Canada) Kaiya Ruiter	(Canada) Justine Miclette	

=== Pairs ===
Senior pairs' event medalists
Year	Location	Gold	Silver	Bronze	Ref.
2014 CS	Barrie	(Canada); Meagan Duhamel; Eric Radford	(United States); Haven Denney; Brandon Frazier	(United States); Jessica Calalang; Zack Sidhu	
2015	Barrie	(Canada); Meagan Duhamel; Eric Radford	(United States); Marissa Castelli; Mervin Tran	(United States); Jessica Pfund; Joshua Santillan	
2016 CS	Montreal	(Canada); Julianne Séguin; Charlie Bilodeau	(France); Vanessa James; Morgan Ciprès	(United States); Marissa Castelli; Mervin Tran	
2017 CS	Montreal	(France); Vanessa James; Morgan Ciprès	(Canada); Meagan Duhamel; Eric Radford	(Canada); Julianne Séguin; Charlie Bilodeau	
2018 CS	Oakville	(France); Vanessa James; Morgan Ciprès	(Canada); Kirsten Moore-Towers; Michael Marinaro	(United States); Haven Denney; Brandon Frazier	
2019	Oakville	No pairs competition held			
2020	Oakville	Competition cancelled due to the COVID-19 pandemic			
2021 CS	Montreal	(Japan); Riku Miura; Ryuichi Kihara	(Canada); Vanessa James; Eric Radford	(United States); Ashley Cain-Gribble; Timothy LeDuc	
2022	No competition held				
2023 CS	Montreal	(Canada); Deanna Stellato-Dudek; Maxime Deschamps	(Japan); Riku Miura; Ryuichi Kihara	(Canada); Emmanuelle Proft; Nicolas Nadeau	

=== Ice dance ===
Senior ice dance event medalists
Year	Location	Gold	Silver	Bronze	Ref.
2014 CS	Barrie	(France); Gabriella Papadakis; Guillaume Cizeron	(Canada); Piper Gilles; Paul Poirier	(Denmark); Laurence Fournier Beaudry; Nikolaj Sørensen	
2015	Barrie	(Canada); Nicole Orford; Asher Hill	(Canada); Andréanne Poulin; Marc-André Servant	(United States); Karina Manta; Joseph Johnson	
2016 CS	Montreal	(Canada); Tessa Virtue; Scott Moir	(United States); Kaitlin Hawayek; Jean-Luc Baker	(Denmark); Laurence Fournier Beaudry; Nikolaj Sørensen	
2017 CS	Montreal	(Canada); Tessa Virtue; Scott Moir	(Canada); Kaitlyn Weaver; Andrew Poje	(Canada); Piper Gilles; Paul Poirier	
2018 CS	Oakville	(Canada); Kaitlyn Weaver; Andrew Poje	(Spain); Olivia Smart; Adrián Díaz	(Canada); Carolane Soucisse; Shane Firus	
2019 CS	Oakville	(Canada); Piper Gilles; Paul Poirier	(United Kingdom); Lilah Fear; Lewis Gibson	(France); Marie-Jade Lauriault; Romain Le Gac	
2020	Oakville	Competition cancelled due to the COVID-19 pandemic			
2021 CS	Montreal	(Canada); Piper Gilles; Paul Poirier	(Spain); Olivia Smart; Adrián Díaz	(United States); Caroline Green; Michael Parsons	
2022	No competition held				
2023 CS	Montreal	(United States); Eva Pate; Logan Bye	(France); Evgeniia Lopareva; Geoffrey Brissaud	(South Korea); Hannah Lim; Ye Quan	

== Junior medalists ==
=== Men's singles ===
Junior men's event medalists
Year	Location	Gold	Silver	Bronze	Ref.
2015	Barrie	(South Korea) Cha Jun-hwan	(Canada) Joseph Phan	(United Kingdom) Hugh Brabyn-Jones	
2016	Montreal	(Canada) Edrian Paul Celestino	(Israel) Mark Gorodnitsky	(Canada) Iliya Kovler	
2017	Montreal	(Canada) Eric Liu	(Canada) Beresford Clements	(Canada) Iliya Kovler	

=== Women's singles ===
Junior women's event medalists
Year	Location	Gold	Silver	Bronze	Ref.
2015	Barrie	(Romania) Amanda Stan	(Canada) Alicia Pineault	(Canada) McKenna Colthorp	
2016	Montreal	(Canada) Aurora Cotop	(Canada) Olivia Gran	(South Korea) An So-hyun	
2017	Montreal	(France) Julie Froetscher	(South Korea) Jeon Su-been	(Canada) Hannah Dawson	

== Cumulative medal count (senior medalists) ==
=== Men's singles ===
Total number of Autumn Classic International medals in men's singles by nation
Rank	Nation	Gold	Silver	Bronze	Total
1	Japan	4	1	0	5
2	United States	2	0	2	4
3	Canada	1	3	6	10
4	Spain	1	0	0	1
5	France	0	2	0	2
6	South Korea	0	1	0	1
6	Uzbekistan	0	1	0	1
Totals (7 entries)		8	8	8	24

=== Women's singles ===
Total number of Autumn Classic International medals in women's singles by nation
Rank	Nation	Gold	Silver	Bronze	Total
1	Canada	2	2	2	6
2	Japan	2	2	0	4
3	United States	2	1	1	4
4	Kazakhstan	1	0	2	3
5	Cyprus	1	0	0	1
6	Russia	0	2	0	2
7	South Korea	0	1	2	3
8	France	0	0	1	1
Totals (8 entries)		8	8	8	24

=== Pairs ===
Total number of Autumn Classic International medals in pairs by nation
Rank	Nation	Gold	Silver	Bronze	Total
1	Canada	4	3	2	9
2	France	2	1	0	3
3	Japan	1	1	0	2
4	United States	0	2	5	7
Totals (4 entries)		7	7	7	21

=== Ice dance ===
Total number of Autumn Classic International medals in ice dance by nation
Rank	Nation	Gold	Silver	Bronze	Total
1	Canada	6	3	2	11
2	United States	1	1	2	4
3	France	1	1	1	3
4	Spain	0	2	0	2
5	Great Britain	0	1	0	1
6	Denmark	0	0	2	2
7	South Korea	0	0	1	1
Totals (7 entries)		8	8	8	24

=== Total medals ===
Total number of Autumn Classic International medals by nation
Rank	Nation	Gold	Silver	Bronze	Total
1	Canada	13	11	12	36
2	Japan	7	4	0	11
3	United States	5	4	10	19
4	France	3	4	2	9
5	Spain	1	2	0	3
6	Kazakhstan	1	0	2	3
7	Cyprus	1	0	0	1
8	South Korea	0	2	3	5
9	Russia	0	2	0	2
10	Great Britain	0	1	0	1
10	Uzbekistan	0	1	0	1
12	Denmark	0	0	2	2
Totals (12 entries)		31	31	31	93
