= Joshua Santillan =

American pair skater

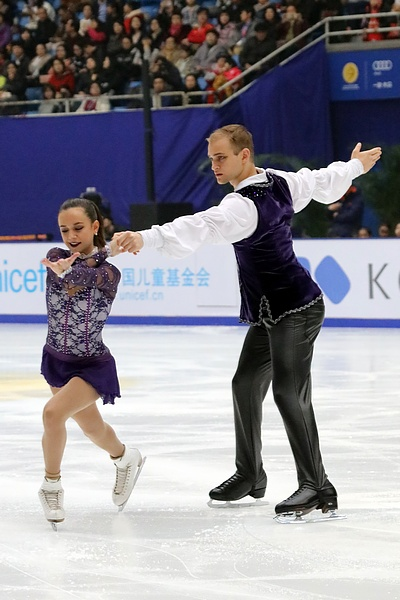
- Pfund and Santillan at the 2016 Cup of China

Personal information
- Born: February 21, 1992 (age 34) Glendale, California, U.S.
- Home town: Palmetto, Florida, U.S.
- Height: 5 ft 10 in (1.78 m)

Figure skating career
- Country: Switzerland (2021–22); United States (2015–20)
- Discipline: Pair skating
- Began skating: 1996
- Retired: March 18, 2022

Medal record
Swiss Championships
Gold medal – first place	2022 Lucerne	Pairs

Joshua Santillan (born February 21, 1992) is a retired American pair skater who represents Switzerland. With skating partner Jessica Pfund, he is the 2015 Autumn Classic International bronze medalist and has competed at two Grand Prix events. They are the 2022 Swiss national champions.

== Personal life ==
Santillan was born on February 21, 1992, in Glendale, California. He enrolled at Colorado Christian University, taking online business courses.

== Career ==
=== Early career ===
Santillan began learning to skate in 1996. He teamed up with Olivia Oltmanns in September 2009. The pair's international debut took place in September 2010 at a Junior Grand Prix (JGP) event in Graz, Austria. Their best JGP placement, 7th, came in September 2011 in Riga, Latvia.

Oltmanns/Santillan moved up to the senior level in the 2014–15 season. They finished 11th at the 2015 U.S. Championships. Trudi Oltmanns coached the pair in Minnesota.

=== Partnership with Pfund ===
Santillan teamed up with Jessica Pfund in May 2015, following tryouts in Florida and Colorado Springs, Colorado. They decided to be coached by Lyndon Johnston in Ellenton, Florida and, early in their partnership, also trained with Jim Peterson and Amanda Evora. Making their international debut, the pair won the bronze medal at the 2015 Autumn Classic International. Appearing as late replacements for Gretchen Donlan / Nathan Bartholomay, they finished 8th at their first Grand Prix event, the 2015 Skate America.

Pfund underwent surgery in mid-2016 due to two torn ligaments in her right foot and returned to the ice three months later. She and Santillan finished 8th at the 2016 Cup of China. Following the event, she had an amniotic stem cell injection to treat tendinitis in her anterior tendon and a bone cement injection for a chronic bruise in her talus bone. In January 2017, Santillan had a strained rotator cuff in his right shoulder. The pair placed 5th at the 2017 U.S. Championships.

In October 2020, Pfund and Santillan announced their intention to represent Switzerland in competition, but were told by the U.S. Figure Skating Federation that they would have to wait a year to be released. In July 2021, they announced they were allowed to represent Switzerland for the 2021-2022 season.

On March 18, 2022, they announced their retirement from competitive skating.

== Programs ==
=== With Pfund ===
Season	Short program	Free skating
2018–2020	Creep by Radiohead performed by Brian Justin Crum	Interstellar by Hans Zimmer
2017–2018	You Raise Me Up performed by Josh Groban	Gone with the Wind by Max Steiner
2016–2017	Purple Rain by Prince, The Revolution, Stacy Francis choreo. by Emilie Connors	Don't Cry for Me Argentina (from Evita) by Andrew Lloyd Webber choreo. by Lyndon Johnston
2015–2016	Gravity by Sara Bareilles choreo. by Amanda Evora	Prince Igor by Alexander Borodin choreo. by Jim Peterson

=== With Oltmanns ===
Season	Short program	Free skating
2012–2013	Sirtaki (from Zorba the Greek) by Mikis Theodorakis performed by André Rieu	Time to Say Goodbye by Francesco Sartori performed by Dimo Dimov, Per Nielsen
2011–2012	The Pink Panther Theme by Bobby McFerrin	Assassin's Tango (from Mr. & Mrs. Smith) by John Powell
2010–2011	My Heart Will Go On (from Titanic) by James Horner	Capone (from Michael Flatley's Celtic Tiger by Ronan Hardiman
2009–2010	(I) Can, Can (You)? by Vanessa-Mae	Arabia (from Don Juan DeMarco) by Michael Kamen

== Competitive highlights ==
- GP – Event of the ISU Grand Prix Series
- JGP – Event of the ISU Junior Grand Prix Series
- CS – Event of the ISU Challenger Series

=== Pair skating with Jessica Pfund (for Switzerland) ===
Competition placements at senior level
Season	2021–22
Swiss Championships	1st
CS Autumn Classic	6th
Cranberry Cup	8th

=== Pair skating with Jessica Pfund (for the United States) ===
Competition placements at senior level
Season	2015–16	2016–17	2017–18	2018–19	2019–20
U.S. Championships	7th	5th	8th		8th
GP Cup of China		8th			
GP Skate America	8th				
CS Finlandia Trophy				9th	
CS Lombardia Trophy		4th			
CS Ondrej Nepela Trophy			4th		
CS Warsaw Cup			5th		
Autumn Classic	3rd				

=== Pair skating with Olivia Oltmanns (for the United States) ===
International
Event	10–11	11–12	12–13	13–14	14–15
JGP Austria	11th	11th			
JGP Latvia		7th			
JGP United States			12th		
National
U.S. Championships	11th J	9th J	11th J	6th J	11th
