= Jessica Pfund =

Swiss-American pair skater

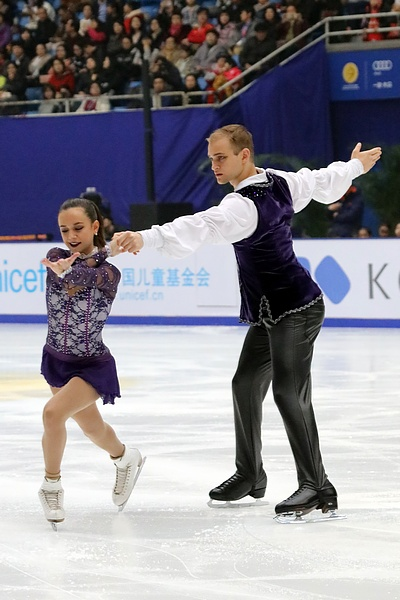
- Pfund and Santillan at the 2016 Cup of China

Personal information
- Born: January 9, 1998 (age 28) Los Gatos, California, U.S.
- Home town: Palmetto, California, U.S.
- Height: 5 ft 3 in (1.60 m)

Figure skating career
- Country: Switzerland (2021–22); United States (2015–20)
- Discipline: Pair skating
- Skating club: Southwest Florida Figure Skating Club
- Began skating: 2003
- Retired: March 18, 2022
Representing Switzerland
Swiss Championships
Gold medal – first place	2022 Lucerne	Pairs

Jessica Pfund (born January 9, 1998) is a retired Swiss-American pair skater who represents Switzerland. With skating partner Joshua Santillan, she was the 2015 Autumn Classic International bronze medalist and has competed at two Grand Prix events. The pair was also the 2022 Swiss national champions. In 2023, Pfund received a four year suspension for the presence and use of banned substances.

== Career ==
=== Early career ===
Pfund began learning to skate in 2003. As a single skater, she won the juvenile bronze medal at the 2009 U.S. Junior Championships and placed 12th on the novice level at the 2011 U.S. Championships.

In the 2011–12 season, Pfund began competing in pair skating with AJ Reiss. In 2012, they appeared at two Junior Grand Prix events, placing 5th in Lake Placid, New York, and 7th in Chemnitz, Germany. Competing on the senior level, they placed tenth at the 2014 U.S. Championships. They were coached by Peter Oppegard in Artesia, California.

=== Partnership with Santillan ===
Pfund teamed up with Joshua Santillan in May 2015, following tryouts in Florida and Colorado Springs, Colorado. They decided to be coached by Lyndon Johnston in Ellenton, Florida, and, early in their partnership, also trained with Jim Peterson and Amanda Evora. Making their international debut, the pair won the bronze medal at the 2015 Autumn Classic International. Appearing as late replacements for Gretchen Donlan / Nathan Bartholomay, they finished 8th at their first Grand Prix event, the 2015 Skate America.

Pfund underwent surgery in mid-2016 due to two torn ligaments in her right foot and returned to the ice three months later. She and Santillan finished 8th at the 2016 Cup of China. Following the event, she had an amniotic stem cell injection to treat tendinitis in her anterior tendon and a bone cement injection for a chronic bruise in her talus bone. In January 2017, Santillan had a strained rotator cuff in his right shoulder. The pair placed 5th at the 2017 U.S. Championships.

In October 2020, Pfund and Santillan announced their intention to represent Switzerland in competition, but were told by the U.S. Figure Skating Federation that they would have to wait a year to be released. In July 2021, they announced they were allowed to represent Switzerland for the 2021-2022 season.

On March 18, 2022, they announced their retirement from competitive skating.

During the competition control at the Elite Swiss Championships 2021, Pfund tested positive for the prohibited substances amphetamine, cocaine, and metabolites. On May 3, 2023, she was sentenced by the Swiss Sports Disciplinary Chamber (DK) to a four-year suspension, effective on January 6, 2022 and valid for all sports and any functions in sports worldwide. In addition, Pfund was required to pay costs and fine.

== Programs ==
=== With Santillan ===
Season	Short program	Free skating
2018–2020	Creep by Radiohead performed by Brian Justin Crum	Interstellar by Hans Zimmer
2017–2018	You Raise Me Up performed by Josh Groban	Gone with the Wind by Max Steiner
2016–2017	Purple Rain by Prince, The Revolution, Stacy Francis choreo. by Emilie Connors	Don't Cry for Me Argentina (from Evita) by Andrew Lloyd Webber choreo. by Lyndon Johnston
2015–2016	Gravity by Sara Bareilles choreo. by Amanda Evora	Prince Igor by Alexander Borodin choreo. by Jim Peterson

=== With Reiss ===
Season	Short program	Free skating
2012–2013	Bolero for Violin and Orchestra by Vanessa-Mae	Tristan & Iseult arranged by Maxime Rodriguez
2011–2012	Fantasy on Dark Eyes by Sergio Assad, Odair Assad, Nadja Salerno-Sonnenberg	Treasure Island by Clifton Parker

== Competitive highlights ==
GP: Grand Prix; CS: Challenger Series; JGP: Junior Grand Prix

=== Pairs with Santillan ===
==== For Switzerland ====
International
Event	2021–22
CS Autumn Classic	6th
Cranberry Cup	8th
National
Swiss Champ.	1st

==== For the United States ====
International
Event	2015–16	2016–17	2017–18	2018–19	2019–20
GP Cup of China		8th			
GP Skate America	8th				
CS Finlandia Trophy				9th	
CS Lombardia Trophy		4th			
CS Ondrej Nepela			4th		
CS Warsaw Cup			5th		
Autumn Classic	3rd				
National
U.S. Championships	7th	5th	8th	WD	8th

=== Pairs with Reiss ===
International
Event	2011–12	2012–13	2013–14
JGP Germany		7th	
JGP United States		5th	
Challenge Cup	1st J		
National
U.S. Championships	5th J	6th J	10th
