= Hailey Kops =

Israeli pair skater

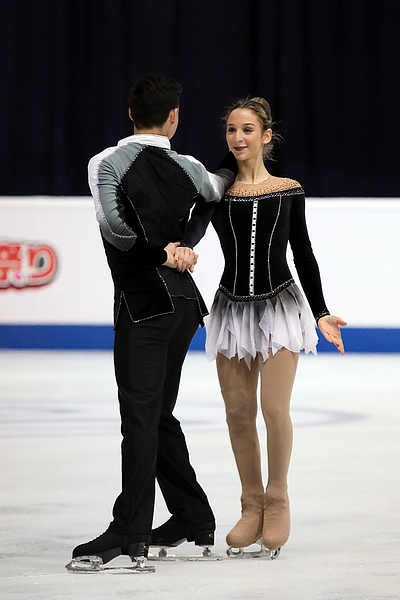
- Kops at the 2019 World Junior Championships

Personal information
- Native name: היילי קופס
- Full name: Hailey Esther Kops
- Born: June 1, 2002 (age 24) New York City
- Height: 1.60 m (5 ft 3 in)

Figure skating career
- Country: Israel
- Partner: Evgeni Krasnopolski
- Coach: Galit Chait Moracci; Anton Nimenko
- Skating club: Israel ISF
- Began skating: 2004

Hailey Esther Kops (Hebrew: היילי קופס; born June 1, 2002) is an American-born Israeli pair skater. With former partner Evgeni Krasnopolski, she competed for Israel at the 2022 Winter Olympics.

With her former partner, Artem Tsoglin, she competed in the final segment at two World Junior Figure Skating Championships (2017 and 2018).

== Personal life ==
Kops was born in New York City, New York, and later lived in West Orange, New Jersey. Her parents are Lisa and Steven Kops. She has four brothers Corey, Max, Evan, and Ty. Max played for an Israeli team called Maccabiah. her little brothers Evan and Ty play for an academy for PSA. She is an Orthodox Jew. Her older brother Corey plays ice hockey, in 2015–16, played for the Raanana Hitman of the Israeli League, and in 2017 played for the Kalkaska Rhinos in the United States Premier Hockey League in Michigan.

In high school, she was home-schooled. After graduating from high school, she spent a gap year studying at the Orthodox Jewish Midreshet Amit Seminary in Jerusalem, Israel, in 2020–21.

== Career ==
Kops began learning to skate in 2004. In 2016, she teamed up with Artem Tsoglin to compete for Israel in pair skating. The two made their international debut in September 2016, placing 9th at the ISU Junior Grand Prix in Russia. In March, the pair finished 11th at the 2017 World Junior Championships in Taipei, Taiwan.

Kops/Tsoglin placed 16th at the 2018 World Junior Championships in Sofia, Bulgaria. They were named to Israel's team for the 2019 European Figure Skating Championships in Minsk, Belarus.

After the end of her partnership with Tsoglin, Kops took some time away from the sport. She announced in the summer of 2021 that she had formed a new partnership with Evgeni Krasnopolski. After three months' preparation, they competed at the 2021 CS Nebelhorn Trophy to attempt to qualify a berth for Israel at the 2022 Winter Olympics. Seventh in the short program, they were fourth in the free skate and rose to fifth overall, sufficient to qualify for the third of three available pairs spots. Kops/Krasnopolski qualified for the free skate in the pairs event, finishing fifteenth overall.

== Programs ==
=== With Krasnopolski ===
Season	Short program	Free skating
2021–2022	Torn by Nathan Lanier; Heart Cry by Drehz choreo. by Galit Chait Moracci	The Impossible Dream (from Man of La Mancha) by Mitch Leigh & Joe Darion performed by Josh Groban choreo. by Galit Chait Moracci

=== With Tsoglin ===
Season	Short program	Free skating
2017–2019	Sarabande by Globus choreo. by Galit Chait Moracci	Light of the Seven (from Game of Thrones) by Ramin Djawadi choreo. by Galit Chait Moracci
2016–2017	Rhapsody in Blue by George Gershwin choreo. by Galit Chait Moracci	A Whole New World (from Aladdin) by Alan Menken choreo. by Galit Chait Moracci

== Competitive highlights ==
CS: Challenger Series; JGP: Junior Grand Prix

=== Pairs with Krasnopolski ===
International
Event	21–22
Olympics	15th
Worlds	12th
Europeans	WD
CS Golden Spin	12th
CS Nebelhorn Trophy	5th
CS Warsaw Cup	13th
Cranberry Cup	11th
John Nicks Challenge	7th
National
Israeli Champ.	1st
TBD = Assigned

=== Pairs with Tsoglin ===
International
Event	16–17	17–18	18–19
Europeans			WD
CS Golden Spin			8th
Open Ice Mall			5th
International: Junior
Junior Worlds	11th	16th	7th
JGP Germany	14th		
JGP Russia	9th		
Cup of Tyrol	1st		
Tallinn Trophy	2nd		
Volvo Open Cup	3rd		1st
National
Israeli Champ.			1st J
J = Junior level

=== Ladies' singles ===
National or regional
Event	12–13	13–14	14–15	15–16
New England Regionals				9th I1
North Atlantic Regionals	12th V2	6th V7	19th V1	
Levels: V = Juvenile; I = Intermediate
