= Artem Tsoglin =

Israeli pair skater

Personal information
- Native name: ארטם צוגלין
- Born: November 1, 1997 (age 29) Kharkiv, Ukraine
- Home town: Kiryat Shmona, Israel
- Height: 1.78 m (5 ft 10 in)

Figure skating career
- Country: Israel
- Coach: Galit Chait Moracci; Anton Nimenko
- Skating club: Israel ISF
- Began skating: 2004

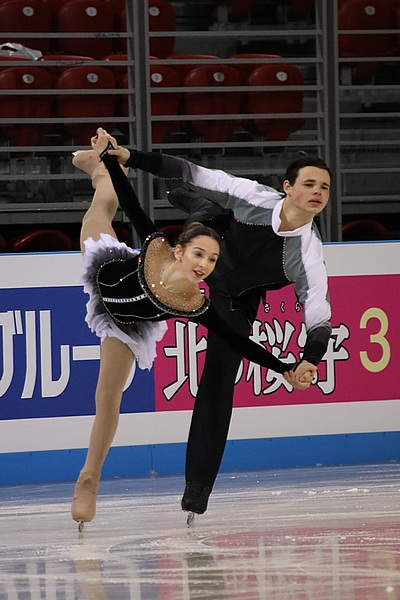

Artem Tsoglin (Hebrew: ארטם צוגלין; born November 1, 1997) is an Israeli pair skater. With his skating partner, Hailey Kops, he has competed in the final segment at two World Junior Championships (2017, 2018).

== Personal life ==
Tsoglin was born on November 1, 1997, in Kharkiv, Ukraine. He later moved to Kiryat Shmona, Israel.

== Career ==
=== Single skating ===
Tsoglin began learning to skate in 2004. He represented Israel in men's singles at two ISU Junior Grand Prix events, in 2014 and 2015. He was coached by Galit Chait Moracci and Roman Serov in Hackensack, New Jersey.

=== Pair skating ===
In 2016, Tsoglin teamed up with Hailey Kops to compete for Israel in pair skating. The two made their international debut in September 2016, placing 9th at the ISU Junior Grand Prix in Russia. In March, the pair finished 11th at the 2017 World Junior Championships in Taipei, Taiwan.

Kops/Tsoglin placed 16th at the 2018 World Junior Championships in Sofia, Bulgaria. They were named in Israel's team for the 2019 European Championships in Minsk, Belarus.

== Programs ==
=== Pairs with Kops ===
| Season | Short program | Free skating |
|---|---|---|
| 2017–2019 | Sarabande by Globus choreo. by Galit Chait Moracci | Light of the Seven (from Game of Thrones) by Ramin Djawadi choreo. by Galit Chait Moracci |
| 2016–2017 | Rhapsody in Blue by George Gershwin choreo. by Galit Chait Moracci | A Whole New World (from Aladdin) by Alan Menken choreo. by Galit Chait Moracci |

=== Men's singles ===
| Season | Short program | Free skating |
|---|---|---|
| 2015–2016 | James Bond music choreo. by Galit Chait Moracci | The Mask; This Business of Love by Domino; Hi De Ho by K7; Hey! Pachuco! by Royal Crown Revue choreo. by Galit Chait Moracci |
| 2014–2015 | El Tango de Roxanne (from Moulin Rouge!) choreo. by Galit Chait Moracci | Bandits (soundtrack) choreo. by Galit Chait Moracci |

== Competitive highlights ==
CS: Challenger Series; JGP: Junior Grand Prix

=== Pairs with Kops ===
International
| Event | 2016–17 | 2017–18 | 2018–19 |
|---|---|---|---|
| Europeans | | | WD |
| CS Golden Spin | | | 8th |
| Open Ice Mall | | | 5th |
International: Junior
| Junior Worlds | 11th | 16th | 7th |
| JGP Germany | 14th | | |
| JGP Russia | 9th | | |
| Cup of Tyrol | 1st | | |
| Tallinn Trophy | 2nd | | |
| Volvo Open Cup | 3rd | | 1st |
National
| Israeli Champ. | | | 1st J |
J = Junior level; TBD = Assigned

=== Men's singles ===
International: Junior
| Event | 11–12 | 13–14 | 14–15 | 15–16 |
|---|---|---|---|---|
| JGP Japan | | | 15th | |
| JGP United States | | | | 11th |
| Bavarian Open | | 19th | 9th | |
| Tallinn Trophy | | | 1st | |
| Toruń Cup | | 4th | | |
| Volvo Open Cup | | | 2nd | |
International: Advanced novice
| Santa Claus Cup | 6th | | | |
| Toruń Cup | 2nd | | | |
