= Dr. Draw =

- Dr. Draw and the Strange Parade performing at the 2026 Roncesvalles Polish Festival in Toronto, Ontario

Background information
- Origin: Toronto, Ontario, Canada
- Genre: experimental electronic
- Years active: 2005–present
- Label: Unsigned

Dr. Draw is the stage moniker of Eugene Draw, a Canadian experimental electric violinist based in Toronto, Ontario. Dr. Draw often plays with his band composed of a guitarist, an electronic keyboardist, an electric harpist, an electric cellist, a rock bassist, and a drummer. Performing in many parts of the world led him to develop a musical style which blends elements of classical violin, jazz-rock fusion, folk and pop.

== Early life ==
Draw moved with his family from Moscow to Toronto when he was nine years old. He attended the Royal Conservatory of Music, but did not graduate.

== Career ==
Draw busked in Toronto as a teenager, and then began entertaining in clubs and bars, performing rock and electronic music. He developed an energetic stage show which crossed into many genres of music.

In 2003, Draw released his first album, The City. A second album, Train 64, was released in 2006; it was named after the Via Rail train route between Montreal and Toronto.

Dr. Draw performed in Singapore and at a number of Louis Vuitton events in Hong Kong, Malaysia, and South Korea. He then recorded a third album, Adagio, which was released in 2007, and toured in Canada to support it.

Draw represented Canada at the World Expo in Shanghai, China in the summer of 2010.

== Discography ==
- The City (2003)
- Train 64 (2006)
- Adagio (2007)
- Distinctively Unclassified (2008)

== Band members ==
As of Spring, 2023:

- Eugene Draw – Violin
- Jeff-Antoine Cote – Drums
- Colin James Gibson – Guitar
- Michael McDonnell – Bass

== See also ==
- Music of Canada
- Canadian rock
- List of Canadian musicians
- List of bands from Canada
- Category:Canadian musical groups
